= Final Wild Songs =

Box set by The Long Ryders
- Released: 22 January 2016
- Recorded: 1983–1987
- Genre: Paisley Underground; garage rock; psychedelia; folk rock; country rock
- Length: 4:31:53
- Label: Cherry Red
- Producer: Earle Mankey; The Long Ryders; Henry Lewy; Paul McKenna; Will Birch; Ed Stasium

The Long Ryders chronology
State of Our Reunion (2007)	Final Wild Songs (2016)	Psychedelic Country Soul (2019)

Final Wild Songs is a four-CD compilation box set by American band the Long Ryders, released in 2016 by Cherry Red Records. It collects the debut EP 10-5-60, the three studio albums Native Sons, State of Our Union and Two-Fisted Tales, as well as a number of rare and unreleased tracks, including a full 1985 live set recorded for radio broadcast in the Netherlands.

The collection was researched and compiled by the Long Ryders' Tom Stevens and Sid Griffin and remastered from original master tapes, where available. "Still Get By", originally track 2 on Native Sons, is omitted from disc one, as requested by its writer Stephen McCarthy for unknown reasons, according to Tom Stevens.

== Reception ==
Professional ratings
Review scores
Source	Rating
AllMusic	5/5 stars
Americana UK	10/10
Classic Rock	9/10
Mojo	4/5 stars
Peterborough Telegraph	9/10
PopMatters	8/10 stars
Q	4/5 stars
Record Collector	5/5 stars
R2	5/5 stars
Scottish Daily Express	4/5 stars
Shindig!	4/5 stars
The Sun	4.5/5 stars
Uncut	4/5 stars
Vive Le Rock	8/10

Final Wild Songs received positive critical reception upon release. Americana UK called it "truly glorious" and "an absolute essential purchase, even if one already has the original albums", and Vive Le Rock said it was "a great set for long-time fans and curious newcomers alike". In a four-star rating, Uncut wrote, "What’s clear now is that the Ryders are the bridge between country rock and what became Americana. ... They were country, and punk, and rock’n’roll. They did foot-on-the-floor boogie, cajun, a bit of psychedelic rock. They wore their fringes like Roger McGuinn. They were Tom Petty, without the heartbreak." Mojo stated, "They unwittingly invented Americana, but seldom receive credit for it. This 4-CD box set puts the record straight." R2 magazine wrote, "The set is tail-ended by a Dutch live recording from 1985, but it's much of a muchness really. It's the quality of the original releases themselves, plus the accompanying B-sides, outtakes and demos, that make this collection essential."

== Track listing ==
=== Disc one: 1983–1984 ===
No.	Title	Writer(s)	Original release	Length
1.	"Join My Gang"	Sid Griffin	10-5-60, 1983	2:44
2.	"You Don't Know What's Right, You Don't Know What's Wrong"	Stephen McCarthy, Des Brewer	10-5-60	4:03
3.	"10-5-60"	Griffin, Barry Shank	10-5-60	3:11
4.	"And She Rides"	Griffin, Greg Sowders	10-5-60	4:30
5.	"Born to Believe in You"	Griffin	10-5-60	3:07
6.	"Final Wild Son"	Griffin, McCarthy	Native Sons, 1984	2:35
7.	"Ivory Tower"	Shank	Native Sons	3:00
8.	"Run Dusty Run"	Griffin, Sowders	Native Sons	2:24
9.	"(Sweet) Mental Revenge"	Mel Tillis	Native Sons	2:50
10.	"Fair Game"	Griffin, McCarthy	Native Sons	2:35
11.	"Tell It to the Judge on Sunday"	Griffin	Native Sons	3:06
12.	"Wreck of the 809"	McCarthy, Tom Stevens	Native Sons	3:54
13.	"Too Close to the Light"	Griffin, McCarthy, Stevens, Sowders	Native Sons	4:00
14.	"Never Got to Meet the Mom"	Griffin	Native Sons	2:14
15.	"I Had a Dream"	McCarthy	Native Sons	3:50
16.	"Masters of War" (from 5x5 sessions, A&M Studios, Hollywood, February 1985)	Bob Dylan	Looking for Lewis and Clark: the Long Ryders Anthology, 1998	4:33
17.	"Black Girl" (Live at McCabe's, Santa Monica, 18 May 1984)	Traditional	Previously unreleased	2:52
18.	"Wreck of the 809" (Live at McCabe's, Santa Monica, 18 May 1984)	McCarthy, Stevens	Previously unreleased	3:35
19.	"Further Along" (Live at McCabe's, Santa Monica, 18 May 1984)	Traditional; arr. by Gram Parsons; Chris Hillman	Previously unreleased	4:53
20.	"The Rains Came" (Live at CBGB's, New York City, 19 April 1984)	Huey P. Meaux	Previously unreleased	2:36
21.	"You Can't Judge a Book by the Cover" (Live at the West End, Chicago, 3 November 1984)	Willie Dixon	Previously unreleased	5:49
Total length:				72:52

=== Disc two: 1985 ===
No.	Title	Writer(s)	Original release	Length
1.	"Looking for Lewis and Clark"	Griffin	State of Our Union, 1985	3:09
2.	"Lights of Downtown"	McCarthy	State of Our Union	3:11
3.	"WDIA"	Griffin, McCarthy	State of Our Union	3:44
4.	"Mason-Dixon Line"	McCarthy	State of Our Union	4:23
5.	"Here Comes That Train Again"	McCarthy	State of Our Union	3:24
6.	"Years Long Ago"	Stevens	State of Our Union	3:39
7.	"Good Times Tomorrow, Hard Times Today"	Griffin	State of Our Union	3:58
8.	"Two Kinds of Love"	Griffin	State of Our Union	4:20
9.	"You Just Can't Ride the Boxcars Anymore"	Stevens	State of Our Union	3:02
10.	"Capturing the Flag"	Griffin, McCarthy, Stevens, Sowders, Will Birch	State of Our Union	3:52
11.	"State of My Union"	Griffin, Sowders	State of Our Union	4:48
12.	"Southside of the Story"	Griffin, Sowders	B-side from "Looking for Lewis and Clark (Extended Version)", 1985	3:21
13.	"Child Bride"	McCarthy, Sowders	B-side from "Looking for Lewis and Clark"	2:47
14.	"If I Were a Bramble and You Were a Rose"	Griffin	B-side from "Looking for Lewis and Clark (Extended Version)"	4:49
15.	"Looking for Lewis and Clark" (Recorded live for BBC's the Old Grey Whistle Test, 1 October 1985)	Griffin	Previously unreleased	3:25
16.	"Lights of Downtown" (Captain's Mix)	McCarthy	Previously unreleased	3:09
17.	"Capturing the Flag" (Captain's Mix)	Griffin, McCarthy, Stevens, Sowders, Birch	Previously unreleased	3:27
18.	"Christmas in New Zealand"	Griffin, McCarthy, Stevens, Sowders	Flexi disc, 1985	4:39
19.	"Encore from Hell" (Recorded live at the Mean Fiddler, London, December 1985)	Griffin, McCarthy, Stevens, Sowders	Flexi disc, 1986	3:30
Total length:				69:17

=== Disc three: 1986 ===
No.	Title	Writer(s)	Original release	Length
1.	"Gunslinger Man"	Griffin	Two-Fisted Tales, 1987	3:14
2.	"I Want You Bad"	Terry Adams, Phil Crandon	Two-Fisted Tales	2:42
3.	"A Stitch in Time"	Stevens	Two-Fisted Tales	4:09
4.	"The Light Gets in the Way"	McCarthy	Two-Fisted Tales	3:56
5.	"Prairie Fire"	Griffin, Sowders	Two-Fisted Tales	2:48
6.	"Baby's in Toyland"	Griffin	Two-Fisted Tales	4:16
7.	"Long Story Short"	Griffin	Two-Fisted Tales	3:46
8.	"Man of Misery"	McCarthy	Two-Fisted Tales	3:34
9.	"Harriet Tubman's Gonna Carry Me Home"	Griffin	Two-Fisted Tales	3:35
10.	"For the Rest of My Days"	McCarthy	Two-Fisted Tales	4:45
11.	"Spectacular Fall"	Griffin	Two-Fisted Tales	4:50
12.	"Ring Bells"	Griffin	B-side from "I Want You Bad", 1987	2:12
13.	"17 Ways" (Demo; recorded at Control Center, Los Angeles, April 1986)	Stevens	Looking for Lewis and Clark: the Long Ryders Anthology	3:15
14.	"Basic Black" (Demo; recorded at Score One, Burbank, 17 July 1986)	Griffin	Looking for Lewis and Clark: the Long Ryders Anthology	4:49
15.	"Pushin' Uphill" (Demo; recorded at Penguin Studios, Pasadena, September 1986)	McCarthy	Looking for Lewis and Clark: the Long Ryders Anthology	3:25
16.	"How Do We Feel What's Real?" (Demo; recorded at Score One, Burbank, 17 July 1986)	Stevens	Previously unreleased	3:11
17.	"He's Got Himself a Young Girl (and He Can't Keep Up)" (Demo; recorded at Control Center, Los Angeles, April 1986)	Griffin	Looking for Lewis and Clark: the Long Ryders Anthology	2:56
18.	"He Can Hear His Brother Calling" (Demo; recorded at Score One, Burbank, 17 July 1986)	McCarthy	Looking for Lewis and Clark: the Long Ryders Anthology	5:12
19.	"Sad Sad Songs" (Demo; recorded at Penguin Studios, Pasadena, September 1986)	Stevens	Previously unreleased	2:31
20.	"Flak Jacket" (Demo; recorded at Control Center, Los Angeles, April 1986)	Griffin	Looking for Lewis and Clark: the Long Ryders Anthology	5:22
21.	"Blues Theme" (Two-Fisted Tales outtake; recorded November–December 1986)	Davie Allan, Mike Curb	Metallic B.O., 1989	3:29
Total length:				76:16

=== Disc four: Live 1985 ===
No.	Title	Writer(s)	Length
1.	"Mason-Dixon Line"	McCarthy	4:20
2.	"Time Keeps Traveling"	Griffin	3:38
3.	"(Sweet) Mental Revenge"	Tillis	2:55
4.	"Run Dusty Run"	Griffin	2:26
5.	"You Don't Know What's Right, You Don't Know What's Wrong"	McCarthy, Brewer	3:56
6.	"As God Is My Witness"	Griffin	4:08
7.	"Ivory Tower"	Shank	3:03
8.	"I Can't Hide"	Cyril Jordan, Chris Wilson	3:01
9.	"Masters of War"	Dylan	4:22
10.	"Wreck of the 809"	McCarthy, Stevens	4:17
11.	"Good Times Tomorrow, Hard Times Today"	Griffin	4:10
12.	"Six Days on the Road"	Earl Green, Carl Montgomery	4:14
13.	"Southside of the Story"	Griffin, Sowders	2:47
14.	"Still Get By"	McCarthy	2:44
15.	"Tell It to the Judge on Sunday"	Griffin	3:26
Total length:			53:28

Note

- Recorded live at the Esther Palais de Danse in Goes, the Netherlands, 6 April 1985.

== Personnel ==
Credits are adapted from the album liner notes.

The Long Ryders

- Sid Griffin – guitar, harmonica, autoharp, bugle, vocals
- Steve McCarthy – guitar, mandolin, steel guitar, lap steel, banjo, keyboards, vocals
- Tom Stevens – bass, double bass, cello, acoustic guitar, vocals (except disc one: 1–5)
- Greg Sowders – drums, percussion, keyboards
- Des Brewer – bass, vocals (disc one: 1–5)

Additional musicians

- Gene Clark – additional vocals (disc 1: 7)
- Dave Pearlman – steel guitar (disc 1: 9)
- Phil Kenzie – tenor and baritone saxophone (disc 1: 11)
- Lee Chaifetz – vocals (disc 1: 19)
- Victoria Williams – vocals (disc 1: 19)
- Snake Davis and his Longhorns – saxophone (disc 2: 3)
- Vic Collins – pedal steel guitar (disc 2: 3)
- Alan Dunn – accordion (disc 2: 13)
- Steve Wickham – violin (disc 2: 14)
- Christine Collister – vocals (disc 2: 14)
- Debbi Peterson – vocals (disc 3: 2)
- Vicki Peterson – vocals (disc 3: 2)
- David Hidalgo – accordion (disc 3: 4)

Technical

- Earle Mankey – producer, engineer (disc 1: 1–5)
- The Long Ryders – producer (disc 1: 1–5, 16; disc 3: 12)
- Henry Lewy – producer, engineer (disc 1: 6–15)
- Paul McKenna – producer (disc 1: 6–15)
- Will Birch – producer (disc 2: 1–14, 16–18)
- Ed Stasium – producer, mixing (disc 3: 1–12, 21)
- Neill King – engineer (disc 2: 1–14)
- Paul Hamingson – engineer, mixing engineer (disc 3: 1–12), mixing (disc 3: 12)
- Mark McKenna – assistant engineer (disc 3: 1–12)
- Tom Root – assistant engineer (disc 3: 1–12)
- Vince McCartney – assistant mixing engineer (disc 3: 1–12)
- Nick Stewart – remix (disc 2: 16, 17)
- Bill Inglot – engineer (disc 3: 14–16, 18, 19)
- Paul B. Cutler – engineer (disc 3: 13, 17, 20)
- Willem Mindermann – engineer (disc 4)
- Danny Mindermann – engineer (disc 4)
- Andy Pearce – mastering
- Phil Smee – artwork
