= The Best of the Long Ryders =

Compilation album by The Long Ryders
- Released: 14 June 2004
- Recorded: 1983–1987
- Genre: Paisley Underground; alternative country; roots rock; Americana
- Length: 65:01
- Label: Prima
- Producer: Earle Mankey; The Long Ryders; Henry Lewy; Paul McKenna; Will Birch; Ed Stasium

The Long Ryders chronology
Three Minute Warnings: the Long Ryders Live in New York City (2003)	The Best of the Long Ryders (2004)	State of Our Reunion (2007)

The Best of the Long Ryders is a compilation album by American band the Long Ryders, released on 14 June 2004 by Prima Records. Spanning the Long Ryder's career from 1983 to 1987, the album features 18 tracks from the band's first three studio albums and their debut EP, a 1987 live recording, and three non-album tracks. All tracks have been remastered for this release by Jerome Schmitt and Sid Griffin in April 2004.

== Reception ==
Professional ratings
Review scores
Source	Rating
AllMusic	4.5/5 stars
Classic Rock	4/5 stars
Encyclopedia of Popular Music	4/5 stars
Independent on Sunday	4/5 stars
Record Collector	4/5 stars
Uncut	4/5 stars

The album received good reviews from critics. Classic Rock called it a "splendid career overview", Record Collector a "stunning best-of", and Time Out "a rollicking collection of twang and vigour." AllMusic wrote, "while this hardly includes every memorable song the group recorded, their best-known tunes are here ... The Best of the Long Ryders ultimately lives up to its title and is a concise but effective summation of what made them special, and why their music continues to resonate today."

== Track listing ==
No.	Title	Writer(s)	Original release	Length
1.	"Looking for Lewis and Clark" (Long Version)	Sid Griffin	State of Our Union, 1985; 10" single version	3:59
2.	"Lights of Downtown"	Stephen McCarthy	State of Our Union	3:06
3.	"Years Long Ago"	Tom Stevens	State of Our Union	3:34
4.	"Gunslinger Man"	Griffin	Two-Fisted Tales, 1987	3:20
5.	"I Want You Bad"	Terry Adams, Phil Crandon	Two-Fisted Tales	2:42
6.	"A Stitch in Time"	Stevens	Two-Fisted Tales	4:09
7.	"Man of Misery"	McCarthy	Two-Fisted Tales	3:32
8.	"If I Were a Bramble and You Were a Rose"	Griffin	B-side from "Looking for Lewis and Clark" 10" single	3:19
9.	"Capturing the Flag" (Live)	Griffin, McCarthy, Stevens, Greg Sowders, Will Birch	Three Minute Warnings: the Long Ryders Live in New York City, 2003	4:07
10.	"State of My Union"	Griffin, Sowders	State of Our Union	4:48
11.	"Final Wild Son"	Griffin, McCarthy	Native Sons, 1984	2:35
12.	"Ivory Tower"	Barry Shanks	Native Sons	2:59
13.	"Sweet Mental Revenge"	Mel Tillis	Native Sons	2:49
14.	"I Had a Dream"	McCarthy	Native Sons	3:50
15.	"You Don't Know What's Right, You Don't Know What's Wrong"	McCarthy, Des Brewer	10-5-60, 1983	4:01
16.	"And She Rides"	Griffin, Greg Sowders	10-5-60	4:30
17.	"Masters of War"	Bob Dylan	Looking for Lewis and Clark: the Long Ryders Anthology, 1998	4:31
18.	"I Can't Hide"	Cyril Jordan, Chris Wilson	Flexi disc single, 1986	3:10
Total length:				65:01

Notes

- "Capturing the Flag" was recorded live at the Bottom Line in New York City on 7 May 1987
- "Masters of War" and "I Can't Hide" were recorded for the abandoned 5 by 5 sessions in February 1985.

== Personnel ==
Credits are adapted from the album liner notes.

The Long Ryders

- Sid Griffin – guitar, autoharp, harmonica, vocals
- Steve McCarthy – guitar, mandolin, banjo, lap steel guitar, vocals
- Greg Sowders – drums
- Tom Stevens – bass, vocals (except 10-5-60)
- Des Brewer – bass, vocals (10-5-60)

Additional musicians

- Gene Clark – vocals on "Ivory Tower"
- Dave Pearlman – pedal steel guitar on "(Sweet) Mental Revenge"
- Will Glenn – violin on "Masters of War"
- Steve Wickham – violin on "If I Were a Bramble and You Were a Rose"
- Christine Collister – vocals on "If I Were a Bramble and You Were a Rose"
- Debbi Peterson – vocals on "I Want You Bad"
- Vicki Peterson – vocals on "I Want You Bad"

Technical

- Will Birch – producer (1–3, 8, 10)
- Ed Stasium – producer (4–7)
- David Van Der Heyden – producer (9)
- Henry Lewy – producer (11–14)
- Paul McKenna – producer (11–14, 17, 18)
- Earle Mankey – producer (15, 16)
- The Long Ryders – producer (15–18)
- Jerome Schmitt – remastering
- Sid Griffin – remastering
- Phil Smee – design
- Greg Sowders – liner notes
- Tom Stevens – liner notes
- Pete Frame – booklet family tree
