= Looking for Lewis and Clark: the Long Ryders Anthology =

Compilation album by The Long Ryders
- Released: July 1998
- Recorded: 1983–1987
- Genre: Alternative country; roots rock; Americana
- Length: 2:25:16
- Label: Chronicles / PolyGram

The Long Ryders chronology
BBC Radio One Live in Concert (1994)	Looking for Lewis and Clark: the Long Ryders Anthology (1998)	Three Minute Warnings: the Long Ryders Live in New York City (2003)

Looking for Lewis and Clark: the Long Ryders Anthology is a two-CD compilation album by American band the Long Ryders, released in July 1998 on PolyGram's Chronicles label. It collects 40 tracks spanning the band's career from 1983 to 1987, including B-sides, demos and live recordings, many of which are previously unreleased. All tracks have been remastered for this release and the album's booklet includes sleevenotes by Rolling Stone's David Fricke. The long version of "Looking for Lewis and Clark" from the 10-inch single release makes its first appearance on CD here.

== Reception ==
Professional ratings
Review scores
Source	Rating
AllMusic	4.5/5 stars
Encyclopedia of Popular Music	4/5 stars

AllMusic's Matthew Greenwald called it "an excellent collection from one of the most honest and genuinely gifted bands of the period." He added, "They were a great band, and should be remembered as such. The Long Ryders' Anthology accomplishes just that." No Depression magazine wrote, "The uninitiated may find in this a new obsession, but old fans will recognize that the Long Ryders have aged pretty darn well for a band that looked and sounded worn to begin with." They felt, however, that the compilation wasn't without flaws, as some of the band's best tracks were omitted to make room for "a dozen or so rarities and (occasionally clunky) demos."

== Track listing ==
=== Disc one ===
No.	Title	Writer(s)	Original release	Length
1.	"10-5-60"	Sid Griffin, Barry Shank	10-5-60, 1983	3:11
2.	"And She Rides"	Griffin, Greg Sowders	10-5-60	4:30
3.	"Born to Believe in You"	Griffin	10-5-60	3:10
4.	"You Don't Know What's Right, You Don't Know What's Wrong"	Stephen McCarthy, Des Brewer	10-5-60	4:02
5.	"Join My Gang"	Griffin	10-5-60	2:48
6.	"Final Wild Son"	Griffin, McCarthy	Native Sons, 1984	2:38
7.	"Ivory Tower"	Shank	Native Sons	3:00
8.	"Still Get By"	McCarthy	Native Sons	2:50
9.	"Run Dusty Run"	Griffin, Sowders	Native Sons	2:26
10.	"(Sweet) Mental Revenge"	Mel Tillis	Native Sons	2:50
11.	"Fair Game"	Griffin, McCarthy	Native Sons	2:40
12.	"Too Close to the Light"	Griffin, McCarthy, Tom Stevens, Sowders	Native Sons	4:11
13.	"I Had A Dream"	McCarthy	Native Sons	3:51
14.	"I'll Get Out Somehow" (Demo)	McCarthy	Previously unreleased; Native Sons demo	3:45
15.	"Masters of War"	Bob Dylan	Previously unreleased; 5x5 sessions	4:41
16.	"I Can't Hide"	Cyril Jordan, Chris Wilson	Flexi disc single, 1986; 5x5 sessions	3:10
17.	"Lights of Downtown"	McCarthy	State of Our Union, 1985	3:07
18.	"Mason-Dixon Line"	McCarthy	State of Our Union	4:21
19.	"Capturing the Flag"	Griffin, McCarthy, Stevens, Sowders, Will Birch	State of Our Union	3:47
20.	"Years Long Ago"	Stevens	State of Our Union	3:33

=== Disc two ===
No.	Title	Writer(s)	Original release	Length
1.	"Looking for Lewis and Clark (Long Version)"	Griffin	State of Our Union; 10" single version, 1985	3:59
2.	"State of My Union"	Griffin, Sowders	State of Our Union	4:49
3.	"Two Kinds of Love"	Griffin	State of Our Union	4:19
4.	"If I Were a Bramble and You Were a Rose"	Griffin	B-side from "Looking for Lewis and Clark" 10" single, 1985	3:20
5.	"Christmas in New Zealand"	Griffin, McCarthy, Stevens, Sowders	Christmas flexi disc single, 1985	4:31
6.	"Basic Black" (Demo)	Griffin	Previously unreleased; Two-Fisted Tales demo	3:10
7.	"Pushin' Uphill" (Demo)	McCarthy	Previously unreleased; Two-Fisted Tales demo	3:18
8.	"He Can Hear His Brother Calling" (Demo)	McCarthy	Previously unreleased; Two-Fisted Tales demo	5:11
9.	"17 Ways" (Demo)	Stevens	Previously unreleased; Two-Fisted Tales demo	3:05
10.	"He's Got Himself a Young Girl (and He Can't Keep Up)" (Demo)	Griffin	Previously unreleased; Two-Fisted Tales demo	2:56
11.	"Gunslinger Man"	Griffin	Two-Fisted Tales, 1987	3:20
12.	"I Want You Bad"	Terry Adams, Phil Crandon	Two-Fisted Tales	2:44
13.	"A Stitch in Time"	Stevens	Two-Fisted Tales	4:08
14.	"Baby's in Toyland"	Griffin	Two-Fisted Tales	4:18
15.	"Harriet Tubman's Gonna Carry Me Home" (Demo)	Griffin	Previously unreleased; Two-Fisted Tales demo	3:34
16.	"The Light Gets in the Way"	McCarthy	Two-Fisted Tales	3:51
17.	"Spectacular Fall"	Griffin	Two-Fisted Tales	4:44
18.	"Flak Jacket" (Demo)	Griffin	Previously unreleased; Two-Fisted Tales demo	5:21
19.	"Ring Bells"	Griffin	B-side from "I Want You Bad" single, 1987	2:21
20.	"Prisoners of Rock 'n' Roll" (Live)	Neil Young	Metallic B.O., 1989	3:46

== Personnel ==
Credits are adapted from the album liner notes.

The Long Ryders

- Sid Griffin – guitar, autoharp, harmonica, bugle, vocals
- Steve McCarthy – guitar, steel guitar, banjo, mandolin, lap steel guitar, keyboards, vocals
- Greg Sowders – drums, percussion, keyboards
- Tom Stevens – bass, double bass, cello, acoustic guitar, vocals (except 10-5-60)
- Des Brewer – bass, vocals (10-5-60)

Additional musicians

- Gene Clark – additional vocals on "Ivory Tower"
- Dave Pearlman – steel guitar on "(Sweet) Mental Revenge"
- Steve Wickham – violin on "If I Were a Bramble and You Were a Rose"
- Christine Collister – vocals on "If I Were a Bramble and You Were a Rose"
- Debbi Peterson – vocals on "I Want You Bad"
- Vicki Peterson – vocals on "I Want You Bad"
- David Hidalgo – accordion on "The Light Gets in the Way"

Technical

- Bill Inglot – compilation producer, mastering, mixing
- Sid Griffin – compilation producer, mixing
- John Strother – mixing
- Dan Hersch – mastering
- Ed Colver – cover photography
- Glen Colver – booklet photos
- Greg Allen – booklet photos
- Henry Diltz – booklet photos
- Wherefore Art? – design
- David Fricke – liner notes
- Terri Tierney – project coordinator
- Catherine Ladis – project assistance
- Bill Levenson – executive producer
- All previously unreleased tracks (except "I Can't Hide") mixed at Penguin Studios, Los Angeles, March 1997
- All tracks mastered at DigiPrep Studios, Hollywood
