= Metallic B.O. =

- Original cassette release

Compilation album by the Long Ryders
- Released: 1989
- Recorded: 1983–1987
- Genres: Country rock; alternative country; roots rock; garage rock
- Length: 90:50 (Cassette); 75:12 (CD)
- Label: R.O.W.Y.C.O.

The Long Ryders chronology
Two-Fisted Tales (1987)	Metallic B.O. (1989)	BBC Radio One Live in Concert (1994)

Alternative cover
- Overground Records CD

Alternative cover
- Prima Records CD

Metallic B.O. is a compilation album by American band the Long Ryders, released in 1989. It was assembled after the Long Ryders disbanded in 1987 by their fan club as an authorized C90 audio cassette release. It contains previously unreleased live recordings and studio outtakes, interspersed with snippets of radio dialogue and music between the actual tracks. The 90 minute tape was subsequently edited down to 75 minutes for CD reissue by Overground Records in 1990, and later by Prima Records in 2000.

== Reception ==
Professional ratings
Review scores
Source	Rating
AllMusic	2.5/5 stars
Encyclopedia of Popular Music	2/5 stars

Trouser Press called it a "spirited cassette-only hodgepodge of live covers, interview snippets and general fooling around". They felt that "with energetically sloppy renditions of tunes by everybody from Dylan to Public Image Ltd (not to mention a dandy version of Michael Jackson's "Billie Jean"), it's a fine epitaph, outlining the Ryders' historical pedigree and distilling the punky edge that rarely made it onto their studio recordings." AllMusic wrote that the album "illustrates the band's power and diversity", and added that "the whole affair has been lovingly and intelligently put together".

== Track listing ==
Side one
No.	Title	Writer(s)	Recording date and location	Length
1.	"You're Gonna Miss Me" (live)	Roky Erickson	14 November 1984; Scorgies, Rochester, New York (audience recording)	3:25
2.	"Route 66" (live)	Bobby Troup	1 June 1985; Club Lingerie, Hollywood, California (soundboard recording)	3:41
3.	"Brand New Heartache" (live)	Felice Bryant, Boudleaux Bryant	1983; Kit Kat Club, Hollywood, California (audience recording)	2:31
4.	"Prisoners of Rock 'N' Roll" (live)	Neil Young	7 May 1987; The Bottom Line, New York City, New York (recorded for FM broadcast by WYRK Radio)	3:51
5.	"Dirty Old Town" (live)	Ewan MacColl	20 August 1986; Raji's, Hollywood, California (audience recording)	4:16
6.	"Is Anyone Going to San Antone" (live)	Glenn Martin, Dave Kirby	9 August 1986; The Cabaret, San Jose, California (soundboard recording)	2:39
7.	"Billie Jean" (State of Our Union sessions outtake)	Michael Jackson	May 1985; Chipping Norton Recording Studios, Oxfordshire (recorded live in the studio)	3:25
8.	"Circle 'Round the Sun" (live)	Traditional	18 May 1984; McCabe's Guitar Shop, Santa Monica, California (soundboard recording)	3:28
9.	"I Want You Bad" (live)	Terry Adams, Phil Crandon	3 June 1987; The Mayfair, Newcastle (recorded for FM broadcast by the BBC Mobile Unit)	2:41
10.	"Six Days on the Road" (live)	Earl Green, Carl Montgomery	8 October 1986; Sheffield University, Sheffield (soundboard recording)	4:09
11.	"Anarchy in the U.K." (live)	John Lydon, Steve Jones, Glen Matlock, Paul Cook	21 April 1985; The Gallery, Manchester (audience recording)	3:19

Side two
No.	Title	Writer(s)	Recording date and location	Length
12.	"What Goes On" (live)	Lou Reed	6 December 1986; Leeds Music, Hollywood, California (audience recording)	4:59
13.	"Masters of War" (live)	Bob Dylan	6 April 1985; T-Boost, Goes (recorded by Dutch radio for FM broadcast)	4:13
14.	"Sandwich Man" (5x5 sessions outtake)	Stephen McCarthy	February 1985; A&M Studios, Hollywood, California	2:41
15.	"Greenville Trestle" (live)	James Jett	15 September 1987, The Roxy Theatre, Hollywood, California (soundboard recording)	3:54
16.	"Blues Theme" (Two-Fisted Tales sessions outtake)	Davie Allan, Mike Curb	23 November 1986; A&M Studios, Hollywood, California (recorded live in the studio)	3:25
17.	"P.I.L. Theme" (live)	Lydon, Keith Levene, Jah Wobble, Jim Walker	31 October 1985; Hammersmith Palais, London (soundboard recording)	2:58
18.	"I Shall Be Released" (live)	Dylan	21 September 1986; Barcelona (recorded by Spanish national radio for FM broadcast)	7:26

Note

- Track lengths indicate only the actual track, omitting between-song dialogue and snippets of music.

=== CD reissue ===
1. "You're Gonna Miss Me"
2. "Route 66"
3. "Brand New Heartache"
4. "Prisoners of Rock 'N' Roll"
5. "Dirty Old Town"
6. "Billy Jean"
7. "Circle 'Round the Sun"
8. "Six Days on the Road"
9. "Anarchy in the U.K."
10. "Masters of War"
11. "Sandwich Man"
12. "Blues Theme"
13. "P.I.L. Theme"
14. "I Shall Be Released"

Note

- The CD release omits the tracks "Is Anyone Going to San Antone", "I Want You Bad", "What Goes On", and "Greenville Trestle".

== Personnel ==
Credits are adapted from the cassette liner notes, except where noted.

The Long Ryders

- Sid Griffin – guitar, harmonica, vocals
- Stephen McCarthy – guitar, banjo, mandolin, vocals
- Greg Sowders – drums, percussion, vocals
- Tom Stevens – bass, double bass, guitar, vocals (except "Brand New Heartache", "Greenville Trestle")
- Des Brewer – bass, vocals on "Brand New Heartache"
- Larry Chatman – bass, vocals on "Greenville Trestle"

Additional musicians

- The Chesterfield Kings – performance on "You're Gonna Miss Me"
- Billy Bragg – vocals, guitar on "Route 66"
- Dave Pearlman – pedal steel guitar on "Brand New Heartache"
- Will Glenn – violin on "Dirty Old Town"
- Steve Mack – lead vocals on "P.I.L. Theme"
- Damian O'Neill – guitar on "P.I.L. Theme"

Technical

- Rick Gershon – compilation producer, editing, liner notes
- Bill Inglot – tape preparation, soundboard mix on "Circle 'Round the Sun"
- John Strother – tape editing, engineer
- Sid Griffin – special assistance
- Tom Stevens – special assistance
- Joey Stella – soundboard mix on "Route 66"
- Will Birch – engineer on "Billy Jean"
- Neill King – engineer on "Billy Jean"
- Ed Stasium – engineer on "Blues Theme"
- Paul McKenna – engineer on "Sandwich Man"
