= Three Minute Warnings: the Long Ryders Live in New York City =

Live album by The Long Ryders
- Released: 2003
- Recorded: 7 May 1987
- Venue: The Bottom Line, New York City
- Genre: Alternative country; country rock; folk rock; Americana
- Length: 68:56
- Label: Prima
- Producer: David Van Der Heyden

The Long Ryders chronology
Looking for Lewis and Clark: the Long Ryders Anthology (1998)	Three Minute Warnings: the Long Ryders Live in New York City (2003)	The Best of the Long Ryders (2004)

Three Minute Warnings: the Long Ryders Live in New York City is a live album by American band the Long Ryders, released in 2003 by Prima Records. It was recorded at the Bottom Line in New York City on 7 May 1987 and broadcast live on FM radio by WYRK.

== Reception ==
Professional ratings
Review scores
Source	Rating
AllMusic	4/5 stars
Blend Magazine	3/5 stars
Encyclopedia of Popular Music	3/5 stars
Mojo	3/5 stars
Q	3/5 stars
The Sunday Times	3/5 stars
Uncut	3/5 stars

Three Minute Warnings was well received by critics. AllMusic rated the album four stars out of five, calling it "a jewel of a concert album", and commented: "The fact is that they're so "on" for this show ... that it almost wouldn't have mattered what they played, as long as they played this way". AllMusic wrote that the guitars "crunch and cut away at folk-ish and country-like melodies, sounding a lot like a garage punk version of the Eagles". Uncut and Mojo both gave it three stars out of five, writing that the live performance displayed "verve and commitment" and "highlights why the Long Ryders mattered". The Edmonton Journal described the album as "punk band energy, fused with clever pop craftmanship", and embellished with "countrified solos". Exclaim! magazine felt that the album contains "stellar versions of their most well-known songs", adding that "it serves as a reminder that without them, Jason & the Scorchers, Rank & File, and others, alt-country wouldn't exist." The Sunday Times described the performance as "loud, fast and impossibly tight ... fusing fragments of mythic Americana with a driving punk aesthetic, prophets without honour, playing for their lives."

== Track listing ==
No.	Title	Writer(s)	Length
1.	"Prairie Fire"	Sid Griffin, Greg Sowders	2:54
2.	"Lights of Downtown"	Stephen McCarthy	2:53
3.	"Man of Misery"	McCarthy	3:11
4.	"A Stitch in Time"	Tom Stevens	4:01
5.	"State of My Union"	Griffin, Sowders	5:25
6.	"Harriet Tubman's Going to Carry Me Home"	Griffin	4:56
7.	"Capturing the Flag"	Griffin, McCarthy, Stevens, Sowders, Will Birch	4:05
8.	"Long Story Short"	Griffin	4:34
9.	"Baby's in Toyland"	Griffin	4:30
10.	"I Want You Bad"	Terry Adams, Phil Crandon	2:42
11.	"Spectacular Fall"	Griffin	4:17
12.	"I Had a Dream"	McCarthy	3:57
13.	"You Just Can't Ride the Boxcars Anymore"	Stevens	3:16
14.	"Gunslinger Man"	Griffin	3:07
15.	"Looking for Lewis and Clark"	Griffin	5:18
16.	"Prisoners of Rock"	Neil Young	4:08
17.	"10-5-60"	Griffin, Barry Shank	5:17
Total length:			68:56

== Personnel ==
The Long Ryders

- Sid Griffin – guitar, harmonica, vocals
- Steve McCarthy – guitar, mandolin, lap steel, vocals
- Tom Stevens – bass, vocals
- Greg Sowders – drums

Technical

- David Van Der Heyden – producer, engineer
- Bob Kranes – broadcast coordination
- Tommy Sjostrom – photography
- Phil Smee – design
