= State of Our Reunion =

Live album by The Long Ryders
- Released: October 2007
- Recorded: 30 June–8 July 2004
- Venue: Dingwalls/Lock 17, London; The Rescue Rooms, Nottingham; King Tut's Wah Wah Hut, Glasgow; The Fleece and Firkin, Bristol
- Genre: Alternative country; roots rock; Americana
- Length: 69:18
- Label: Prima

The Long Ryders chronology
The Best of the Long Ryders (2004)	State of Our Reunion (2007)	Final Wild Songs (2016)

State of Our Reunion is a live album by American band the Long Ryders, released in October 2007 by Prima Records. It was recorded in 2004 in the UK on the band's first tour in 17 years.

== Background ==
Between their formation in 1982 and their breakup in 1987, the Long Ryders took roots rock into "newfound, mutinous territory", according to Eric Thom of Exclaim! magazine, "blending an allegiance to traditional country with the country rock of the Byrds and Burritos, and marrying it to the "couldn't care less" passion of punk." The band enjoyed airplay on college radio and critical success during their five-year run but failed to achieve much mainstream success. They would later prove to be a major influence on the alternative country movement that would emerge in the early 1990s. Writing for The Sunday Times in 2007, Stewart Lee stated, "For a moment, they could have been bigger than the Beatles, but now the Long Ryders nestle alongside Big Star and the Flamin' Groovies as one of the great lost groups."

In 2003, a European booking agent approached the band about putting together a Long Ryders reunion for shows in the UK, Spain and the Netherlands in the summer of 2004. "It was a relief to remove all doubt that the roaring beast that was the Long Ryders remains fully intact from the first notes we played in rehearsal after 17 years," bassist Tom Stevens said. "If anyone had any confusion or doubts over the cliché of the band being greater than the sum of its parts, the example was loud and clear during each of our 2004 shows. The looks on people's faces were priceless as well." The tour was a success for fans and band alike, and a show from Dingwalls in London was later documented on the 2009 DVD State of Our Reunion.

== Reception ==
Professional ratings
Review scores
Source	Rating
Classic Rock	7/10
The Great Rock Discography	6/10
Maverick	4/5 stars
Uncut	2/5 stars

Eric Thom of Exclaim! magazine felt that the band was in "remarkable form" and that "a favourite era for many is reclaimed, rejuvenated and lovingly reinvigorated." Jerry Ewing, writing for Classic Rock, stated that the band's lineup "remind everyone why they're still held in such high esteem." Country music magazine Maverick wrote, "If ever there was a good reason for a band to record a new album after two decades, this is it." Stewart Lee, writing for The Sunday Times, described the band's songs as "timeless slabs of Americana" and "templates for every contemporary music-magazine cover-mounted roots rock band." Uncut's Gavin Martin was less positive, rating the album two out of five stars and writing, "a rough-and-ready approach to toe-tapping outlaw/honky tonk pastiches ... hit the mark, but the attraction is limited – the Ryders remaining a well-intentioned but pale reflection of their inspirations."

== Track listing ==
No.	Title	Writer(s)	Length
1.	"So You Wanna Be a Rock n' Roll Star?"	Roger McGuinn, Chris Hillman	3:01
2.	"Lights of Downtown"	Stephen McCarthy	2:58
3.	"You Don't Know What's Right, You Don't Know What's Wrong"	McCarthy, Des Brewer	4:23
4.	"A Stitch in Time"	Tom Stevens	4:01
5.	"Prairie Fire"	Sid Griffin, Greg Sowders	2:56
6.	"Wreck of the 809"	McCarthy, Stevens	4:05
7.	"Gunslinger Man"	Griffin	3:11
8.	"Years Long Ago"	Stevens	4:08
9.	"I Can't Hide"	Cyril Jordan, Chris Wilson	3:08
10.	"Ivory Tower"	Barry Shank	3:38
11.	"Capturing the Flag"	Griffin, McCarthy, Stevens, Sowders, Will Birch	4:20
12.	"Band Introduction (Glasgow)"		1:35
13.	"I Had a Dream"	McCarthy	4:05
14.	"Final Wild Son"	Griffin, McCarthy	2:53
15.	"Sweet Mental Revenge"	Mel Tillis	3:02
16.	"State of My Union"	Griffin, Sowders	5:12
17.	"Looking for Lewis and Clark"	Griffin	3:45
18.	"Louisville"	Jann Browne, Pat Gallagher	3:29
19.	"10-5-60"	Griffin, Shank	3:48
Total length:			69:18

== Personnel ==
Credits are adapted from the album liner notes.

The Long Ryders

- Sid Griffin – guitar, harmonica, vocals
- Stephen McCarthy – guitar, lap steel, vocals
- Tom Stevens – bass, vocals
- Greg Sowders – drums, percussion

Horn section

- Dave Woodhead – trumpet on "So You Wanna Be a Rock n' Roll Star?", "Ivory Tower" and "State of My Union"
- Caroline Hall – trombone on "Ivory Tower" and "State of My Union"
- Kate St John – saxophone on "Ivory Tower" and "State of My Union"

Technical

- President James A. Garfield (1831–1881) – producer
- Spike – engineer
- Tom Stevens – associated engineer
- Jerome Schmitt – mastering
- Sid Griffin – mastering
- Sean McDonnell – band photography
- David Giltrap – design, artwork
- Mixed at Spike's Airless Emporium, Oxford, spring 2005
- Mastered at Tenth Planet, London
