= The Long Ryders =

American alternative country band

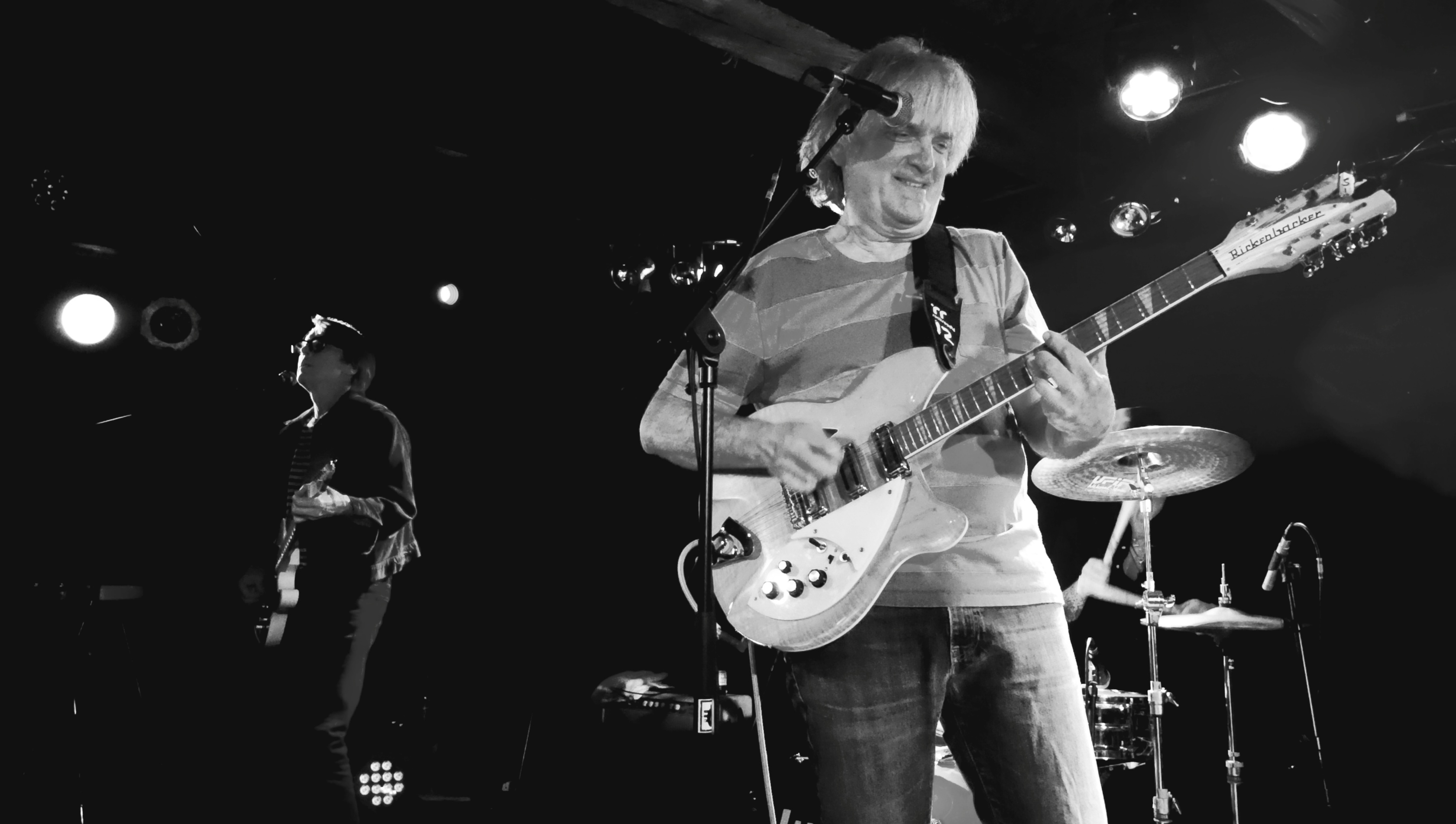
- The Long Ryders performing in 2023.

Background information
- Origin: Los Angeles, California, United States
- Genres: Paisley Underground; alternative country; cowpunk; folk rock; country rock; roots rock; Americana; jangle pop
- Years active: 1982–1987, 2004, 2009, 2014, 2016–present
- Labels: PVC; Frontier; Island; PolyGram; Prima; Cherry Red; Omnivore Recordings
- Members: Sid Griffin; Stephen McCarthy; Greg Sowders
- Past members: Barry Shank; Des Brewer; Tom Stevens
- Website: www.thelongryders.com

The Long Ryders are an American alternative country and Paisley Underground band, principally active between 1982 and 1987, who have periodically regrouped for brief reunions (2004, 2009, 2014, 2016). In 2019 they released a new studio album – their first in 32 years – and played a series of tour dates.

The Long Ryders were originally formed by several American musicians who were each multi-instrumentalists and influenced by Gram Parsons, the Byrds, country music and various punk rock groups. They were named after the Walter Hill film, the Long Riders. The band featured Sid Griffin and Stephen McCarthy on vocals and guitar; Des Brewer on bass (later replaced by Tom Stevens); and Greg Sowders on drums.

Although two members were transplants from the American South, they became a popular Los Angeles rock band, forming in the early 1980s and originally associated with a movement called the Paisley Underground. With a sound reminiscent of Rubber Soul-era Beatles, electric Bob Dylan, Buffalo Springfield and the Flying Burrito Brothers, but with a harder edge, they anticipated the alternative country music of the 1990s by a decade. Their early work contained influences of both punk (largely attributable to devoted record collector Griffin) and old-school country (championed by McCarthy). Former Byrd Gene Clark joined them on their first full-length album, 1984's Native Sons, adding vocals to the song "Ivory Tower". Their initial studio release, the 10-5-60 EP, consisted of Griffin, Brewer, McCarthy, and Sowders. Brewer left after the release of 10-5-60. He was replaced by Tom Stevens, and that line-up remained in place as a recording unit until their eventual demise.

== History ==
=== Formation and early days (1981–1982) ===
The Long Ryders' roots can be traced back to 1960s garage rock revivalist the Unclaimed, who formed in Los Angeles in 1979. After one EP, Kentucky-born guitarist and vocalist Sid Griffin and Kansas-born bassist Barry Shank left the Unclaimed in November 1981 with intentions to form a new band. Griffin: "I had this idea of what would happen if the top of the band, the guitars and the vocals were very West Coast [1960s], punchy and beautiful, but the bass and drums were as aggressive as a punk band. Early rehearsals included Unclaimed drummer Matt Roberts and future Dream Syndicate guitarist Steve Wynn. Drummer Greg Sowders, a native of Los Angeles, had met Griffin through a mutual friend and joined the band in February 1982 after an informal audition. The band rehearsed shortly as a trio before guitarist and vocalist Stephen McCarthy completed the lineup after answering a musicians wanted ad in March. Originally from Virginia, McCarthy had recently moved to Los Angeles and was looking for something "a bit rockier" after playing in country and western bands in New York City and Nashville. They soon settled on the name the Long Ryders, named after the Walter Hill film the Long Riders. The band wrote a letter to actor Stacy Keach, who had starred in and produced the film, asking for his approval to use the name. Keach was "honored" but had suggested a different spelling for legal reasons. The band then decided on the "y" spelling as an homage to the Byrds.

The Long Ryders were initially linked with the neo-psychedelia of Los Angeles' Paisley Underground scene, but McCarthy's arrival soon brought a country element to the band. Griffin: "His Clarence White-style country guitar-playing gave us a direction that nobody else had." Shank left the band in August 1982 to go back to college and was replaced by British expat Des Brewer. Later in the year, the new lineup entered producer Ethan James' Radio Tokyo Studio in Venice, California to record a three-track demo. Two of the tracks, "Still Get By" and "And She Rides", later appeared on the various artists compilation albums The Radio Tokyo Tapes and The Rebel Kind – A Collection of Contemporary Garage and Psychedelic Bands in 1983.

=== 10-5-60 and Native Sons (1983–1984) ===
In September 1983, PVC Records issued the band's self-funded 10-5-60 EP, which was produced by former Sparks guitarist Earle Mankey at his home studio in California. Griffin was working for PVC's parent label Jem Records, an import and distribution label, who agreed to take on distribution. Griffin: "I got us on the in-house label, and they did it as a favour. ... it did really well, and they couldn't believe it". The EP showed a strong 1960s influence, from garage rock and psychedelia to Byrdsian folk and country rock. It was well received by critics, prompting the band to tour the US. Brewer, who was not committed to touring, left after the EP's release and was replaced by Don McCall, who only lasted 3 months before he was asked to leave. "His playing and my drumming never quite clicked," Sowders explained. Tom Stevens from Indiana became the Long Ryders' new bassist in late December, playing his first gig with the band in January 1984, after recommendations from mutual friends. "I didn’t even have to formally audition," Stevens said. "The Long Ryders had gigs coming up in the San Francisco area and needed someone quickly."

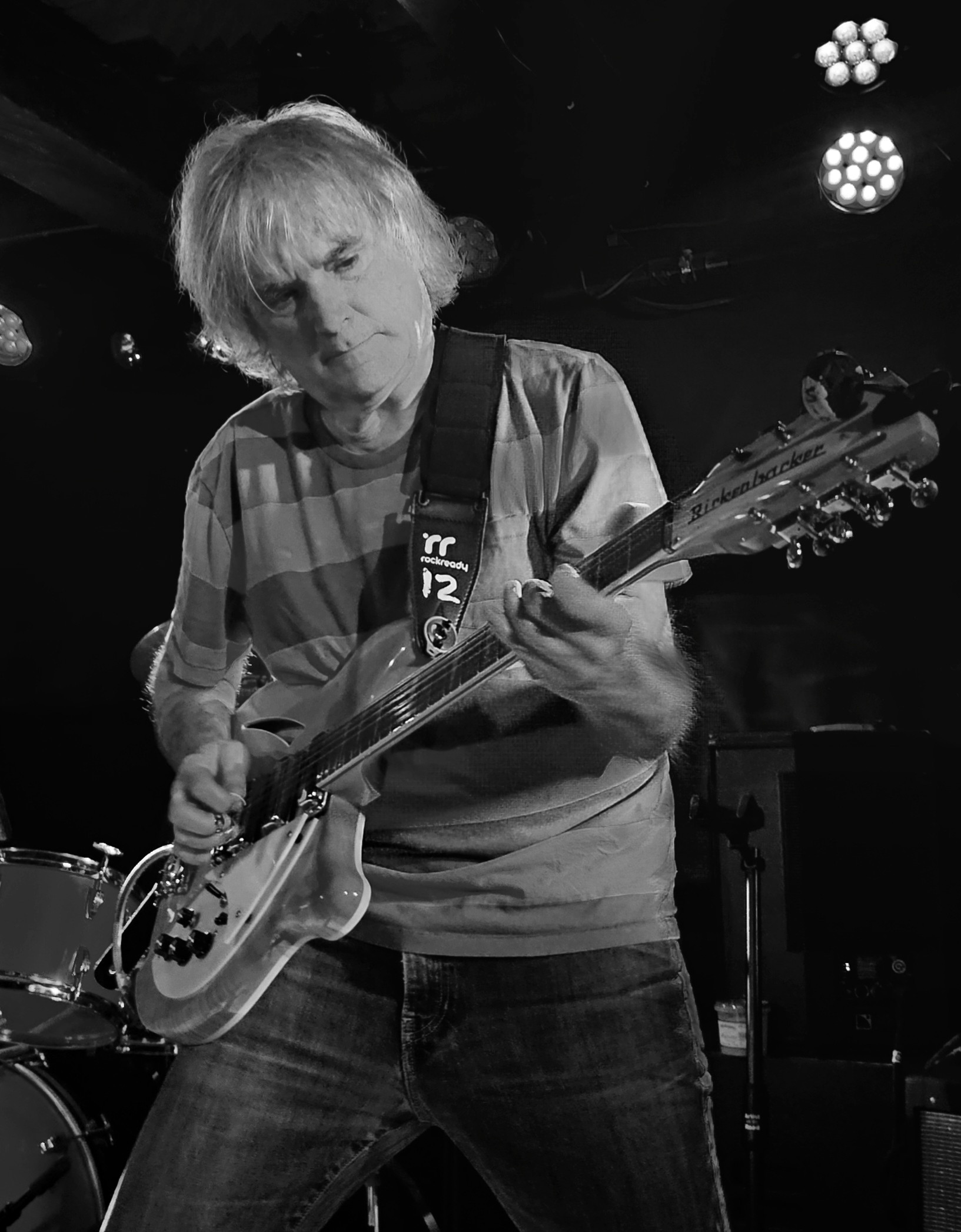
Sid Griffin performing in 2023.

In the spring of 1984, the Long Ryders signed with Los Angeles-based independent record label Frontier Records and recorded their first full-length album, Native Sons, at A&M Studios in Los Angeles in early summer. They chose veteran producer Henry Lewy (Joni Mitchell, the Flying Burrito Brothers) to co-produce the album. Musically, the band had toned down the psychedelia, emphasizing country and rock and roll. The album featured former Byrd Gene Clark adding vocals to the song "Ivory Tower". "Gene was someone we all really admired," Sowders said. "He was around in LA, and we all knew him but it was his manager Saul Davis who arranged his participation at the session." Released in October 1984, Native Sons became the number 4 album on the college radio and Indie charts in the US and received positive critical reviews. The band's take on American musical traditions was especially a success with critics in the UK, where the Melody Maker called it "a modern American classic". Upon release in the UK in March 1985, it was distributed by Zippo Records, who also released "I Had a Dream" as a UK-only single. The album and the single reached number 1 and 4 on the UK Indie Chart, respectively.

=== State of Our Union (1985–1986) ===
Following the success of Native Sons, the Long Ryders decided to reissue the 10-5-60 EP as a full-length album, retitled 5 by 5 with five new studio tracks. The band entered A&M Studios in February 1985 with engineer and co-producer Paul McKenna and recorded at least six tracks: "Time Keeps Travelling", "The Trip", "Sandwich Man", "As God Is My Witness", the Flamin' Groovies' "I Can’t Hide", and Bob Dylan's "Masters of War". The planned album, however, was abandoned when the band would sign a new record deal and prepare to record their next proper album later in the year. Most of the tracks were later included as bonus tracks on future compilation albums and on reissues of Native Sons and 10-5-60. "I Can’t Hide" was released as a flexi disc in 1986 under the moniker the Spinning Wighats and given away free with the Bob magazine.

After touring the US for much of 1984, the Long Ryders embarked on their first international tour to Europe in March and April 1985. "Upon our arrival in the UK," Stevens said, "we were greeted with sold out shows, amazing crowd receptions, the cover of NME, and literally twelve record companies at our London hotel door after our second London show." Island Records UK signed the band in late spring and the band returned to the US to write and demo new songs. Released in September 1985, their first major label album, State of Our Union, was recorded in England at Chipping Norton Studios and produced by Will Birch, formerly of British bands the Kursaal Flyers and the Records. The album was a success at college and alternative radio stations in the US, but its more prominent rock sound didn't please UK critics as much as Native Sons. State of Our Union reached number 66 on the UK Albums Chart as well as number 2 on the UK Country Chart. The single "Looking for Lewis and Clark" peaked at number 59 on the UK Singles Chart but was never released commercially in the US. The album sold well in the UK, where "Looking for Lewis and Clark" gained the band much wider exposure. State of Our Union quickly became the band's biggest selling album, and the band was soon more popular in Europe than in the US, where they failed to break out of the college radio market.

In spring 1986, the Long Ryders were widely criticized for doing a TV commercial in the US for Miller Beer. Fans, critics and certain areas of the music community were outraged and accused the band of selling out. "The Long Ryders doing the Miller Beer ad killed us in the USA. It killed us stone dead. We went from hot to cold in about three weeks," Griffin said. "The Blasters, Los Lobos and X all did beer commercials too, but only us and the Del Fuegos got ripped for it." The band was not getting much airplay on regular commercial radio stations in the US and hoped that a beer commercial would provide them a much-needed exposure. Also, the band was not making any money touring. "To this day the only money the Long Ryders has ever seen is from that beer commercial," Griffin said in 2016. The band, however, continued to tour, building on their success in Europe. In Spain, they headlined in front of 100,000 people at a Barcelona festival in September 1986 which was broadcast live on national radio. Griffin: "Probably the highest of the high points. Graham Parker and the Shot, Wilson Pickett – they were both opening for us that day. I nearly fainted."

=== Two-Fisted Tales and break-up (1987) ===
The Long Ryders had ended 1986 by recording their second Island album, Two-Fisted Tales, in November and December at A&M and Eldorado Studios in Hollywood with producer Ed Stasium (the Ramones, Soul Asylum, the Smithereens, Living Colour). It was mixed in February 1987 at Compass Point Studios in Nassau, Bahamas and features guest appearances by David Hidalgo of Los Lobos and Debbi and Vicki Peterson of the Bangles. On the album, the Long Ryders moved further away from their country rock origins towards a more college rock direction, but were still rooted in traditional Americana music. The finished album was delivered to Island in March, but the release was delayed for two months. "Tom Waits was selling better than Island expected, U2 were still shifting units, and so we were told to wait", Griffin said. In the two years since the Long Ryders signed with Island, several key employees had left the label's A&R department, and the new team showed little interest in the band and the release of Two-Fisted Tales. In the meantime, the band were offered to open for U2 on the North American leg of their Joshua Tree tour in April and May. But since Two-Fisted Tales was delayed, the Long Ryders declined, hoping to join the U2 tour later on. Griffin: "We never did get to open for U2 at all, not even once. So this was a major opportunity blown, no question about it, and a fairly big regret of mine."

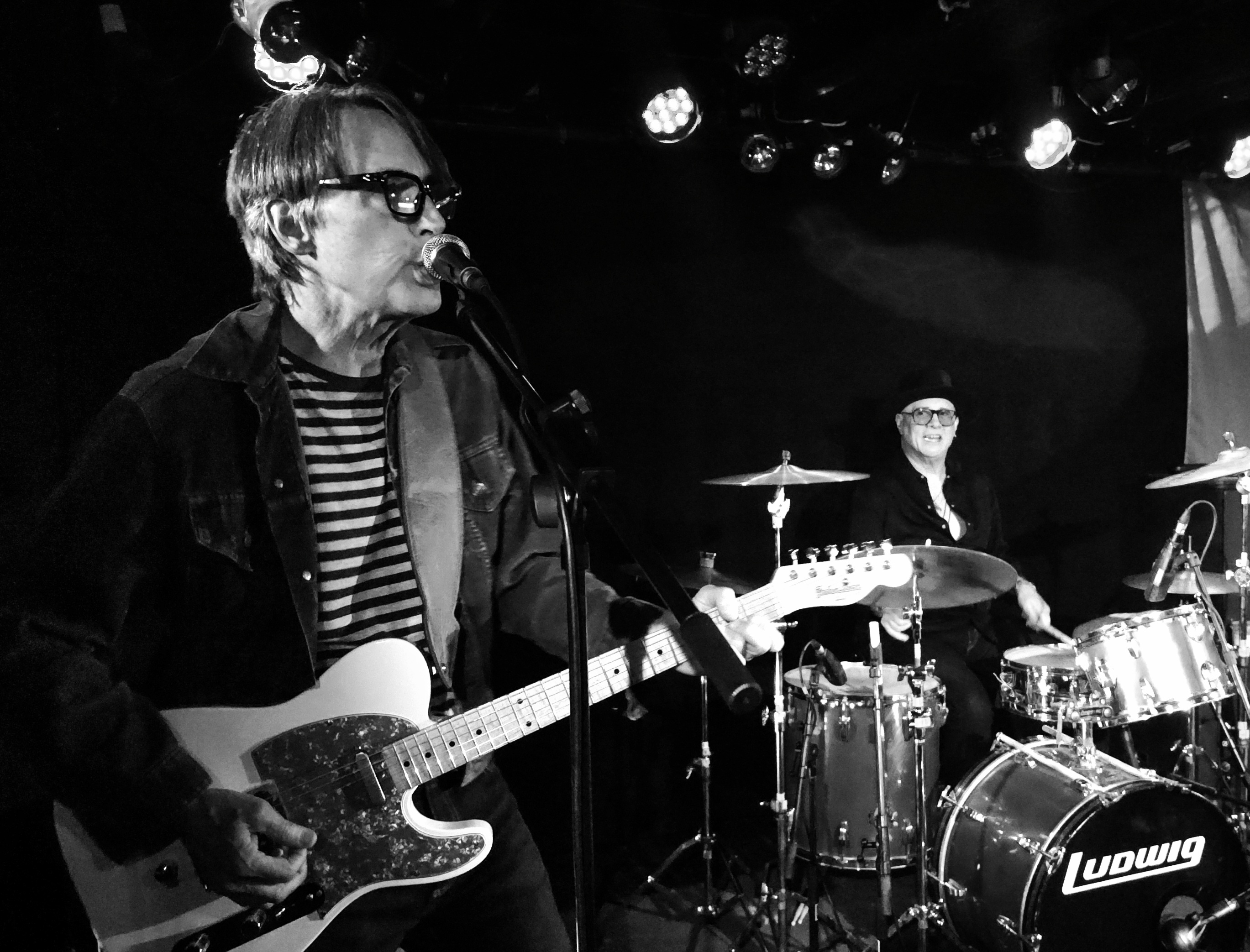
Stephen McCarthy and Greg Sowders in 2023.

The album was finally released in June and despite its first single, a cover of NRBQ’s "I Want You Bad", getting radio airplay, neither single nor album charted. The lack of commercial success and label support as well as a relentless touring schedule began to take its toll on the band. After a European tour, Stevens left the band to be replaced by the band's guitar tech, Larry Chatman, for a US tour that followed immediately. Griffin: "He went on the road with us and learned while driving across the country and in motel rooms at night. We never had a formal rehearsal." In 2013, Stevens explained his reasons for leaving: "The spring 1987 tour of Europe was a nightmare. Despite a major label "deal," we were broke, and I found myself having to find another source of income so that my growing family could eat and have a roof over their heads. In June 1987, when the other Long Ryders insisted upon doing a U.S. tour that was expected to lose five figures, I announced that I was leaving the band."

In August, McCarthy announced to the band that he would be leaving at the end of the US tour. "It was a dead end," he said in 1988. "I don’t regret a day I played in the Long Ryders, but it was futile. I quit before it got to the point of beating each other on stage." Even though Island offered Griffin and Sowders the opportunity to record a third album for the label, they decided not to continue as the Long Ryders without McCarthy. The band did not officially break up until late 1987.

"Our signing with Island in 1985 worked well for the first few months," Stevens said in 2009. "Then our A&R guy got the axe at year's end [and] the new UK regime hated us. Island U.S. was also fairly useless. ... we never seemed to be a big concern for any of them. Between that and the slow shift that started in 1986 to hair metal, the terrain got so creepy and hard to navigate that it put a strain on us as a band, from which we could not recover."

=== Post break-up ===
In 1989, the Long Ryders fan club released the authorized C90 audio cassette compilation Metallic B.O., which contained previously unreleased live recordings and studio outtakes. The tape was subsequently edited down for CD reissue by Overground Records in 1990. Two live albums and two compilation albums were released in the 1990s and 2000s. BBC Radio One Live in Concert (1994) and Three Minute Warnings: the Long Ryders Live in New York City (2003) contain live recordings from 1985 and 1987, while Looking for Lewis and Clark: the Long Ryders Anthology (1998) and The Best of the Long Ryders (2004) collect tracks spanning the band's career from 1983 to 1987, including B-sides, demos and live recordings.

Griffin, who relocated to London, kept busy as a solo artist and bandleader (the Coal Porters, Western Electric), and as a music journalist and author. Since 1994, he has run his own label, the London-based Prima Records. The label is primarily, but not exclusively, an outlet for Griffin's solo projects, and releases by the Long Ryders and the Coal Porters. He wrote several books, including Gram Parsons: A Music Biography (1985), Million Dollar Bash: Bob Dylan, The Band & the Basement Tapes (2007) and Shelter from the Storm: Bob Dylan's Rolling Thunder Years (2010). The second volume was reissued in 2014 to coincide with the release of The Bootleg Series Vol. 11: The Basement Tapes Complete, a six-CD collection to which Griffin contributed liner notes.

McCarthy, after a stint leading his own band, Walker Stories, and appearing on the 1990 multi-artist album True Voices in a duet with Carla Olson on the Tom Jans song "Loving Arms," returned home to Richmond, Virginia; he played in the indie supergroup Gutterball with Steve Wynn and fellow Richmondites Bryan Harvey and Johnny Hott of House of Freaks, and in 2001 began playing with the Jayhawks. Stevens returned to his native Indiana, earned a degree in computer science and released solo albums. Additionally, Sowders, who was briefly married to singer Lucinda Williams, went to work in music publishing. Brewer continued to play the Los Angeles circuit, first accompanying various female singer-songwriters, and then moving on to the old-school country band, the Misbegotten Cowboys. Original bassist Shank holds a PhD in American studies and is a professor at Ohio State University. He is the author of several books, including Dissonant Identities: The Rock 'n' Roll Scene in Austin, Texas (1994), A Token of My Affection: Greeting Cards and American Business Culture (2004), and The Political Force of Musical Beauty (2014).

=== Reunion (2004–2018) ===
In 2003, a European booking agent approached the band about putting together a Long Ryders reunion for shows in the UK, Spain and the Netherlands in the summer of 2004, including a performance at the Glastonbury Festival. "I never thought the Long Ryders would play together again.", Griffin said in 2004. "I'd had offers before to tour as 'Sid Griffin and the Long Ryders', a kind of karaoke version of the Long Ryders playing Long Ryders songs ... But this offer was to get all the originals together, so I passed it along. ... I thought if we don’t do it now we [are] never going to do it." A live album entitled State of Our Reunion resulted from the reunion tour. The band played their first live dates in the US in more than 20 years when they played two shows at the EARL in Atlanta, Georgia in January 2009. "Just some crazy guy with money," Griffin said. In January 2014, the Long Ryders played their first show in Los Angeles in 27 years at the one-off Earle Mankey Appreciation Night concert at the Troubadour. A five date Spanish tour followed in December.

In January 2016, Cherry Red Records released a Long Ryders box set, Final Wild Songs, composed of all the material from their three full-length albums, their one EP, various demos and rarities, and a previously unavailable 15-song performance from a Benelux radio appearance in March 1985. Mojo magazine, in its February 2016 issue, gave the collection a lead review, saying, "They unwittingly invented Americana, but seldom receive credit for it. This 4-CD box set puts the record straight." The band subsequently played 12 dates on the Continent and in the UK in April and May, and 4 East Coast dates in the US in November.

In 2017, Griffin, McCarthy, Sowders and Stevens recorded the first new material for the Long Ryders since 1987. McCarthy: "The band played a number of shows in 2016 and we felt it would be worthwhile to try and write/record some new material." McCarthy and Sowders recorded their parts for a few new songs with engineer and co-producer Adrian Olsen at his Montrose Recording studio in Virginia, while Griffin and Stevens recorded remotely from London and Indiana. A single from these recordings, "Bear in the Woods," was released on April 17, 2017 in time for a 4 date Californian tour in late April.

In November 2018, Cherry Red Records released three-CD box set editions of the band's albums State of Our Union and Two-Fisted Tales, also announcing that a new album from the band would be released in 2019 on Cherry Red Records in the UK and Omnivore Recordings in North America.

=== Psychedelic Country Soul and September November (2019–present) ===
On February 15, 2019, the Long Ryders released Psychedelic Country Soul, the band's first album of new material in 32 years. The opening track, "Greenville", premiered on the Billboard website. It was well received by critics and reached number 2 on the UK Americana Chart, number 4 on the UK Country Chart, and number 10 on the UK Independent Chart. The LA Times said of the album, "The record sounds fantastic", whilst Mojo wrote, "Psychedelic Country Soul puts them right back at the top of a world they helped create." The album was produced by Ed Stasium and recorded mainly at Dr. Dre's Record One studio in Los Angeles, featuring members of the Bangles on harmony vocals and Dave Pearlman (Dan Fogelberg, Phil Everly, Hoyt Axton) on pedal steel guitar. The Long Ryders announced a series of tour dates in 2019 to support the album's release. It was the band's most extensive tour since the 1980s with 43 dates in Europe and North America. Sowders, who was unavailable for the October/November dates in Europe, was temporarily replaced by Simon Hancock. Between January 29 and February 3, 2020, the band participated in the Outlaw Country Cruise music festival, a 5-night boat cruise from Miami, Florida to Falmouth, Jamaica with over 30 artists including Lucinda Williams, the Mavericks and Steve Earle and the Dukes.

McCarthy contributed to Carla Olson's 2020 album, Have Harmony, Will Travel 2, where he plays guitar and duets with Olson on "Timber, I'm Falling In Love", originally a No. 1 hit for Patty Loveless on Billboard's Hot Country Singles and Tracks chart in 1989. He also appears on the 2021 various artists album Americana Railroad, duetting with Olson on two tracks. Their first-ever duet album, The Night Comes Falling, was released in November 2022.

On September 4, 2020, the Long Ryders released a new single titled "Down to the Well". The song had been recorded in February 2017 at the same sessions that produced "Bear in the Woods". The download single includes a remix of "If You Want to See Me Cry", originally from Psychedelic Country Soul.

On January 23, 2021, Tom Stevens died suddenly at the age of 64 at his home in Indiana of undisclosed causes. The tribute single "Tom Tom" was released as a download on January 21, 2022. Due to the COVID-19 pandemic, the Long Ryders and producer Ed Stasium recorded the track remotely, sending audio files back and forth between California (Sowders and Stasium), Virginia (McCarthy), and England (Griffin).

The Long Ryders received the International Trailblazers Award from the Americana Music Association UK in January 2022. Nine months later, the Country Music Hall of Fame in Nashville honored the Long Ryders by including the band in a new exhibition titled “Western Edge: The Roots and Reverberations of Los Angeles Country-Rock.” Lyric sheets for the songs “Looking for Lewis and Clark” and “Gunslinger Man” are on display, as well as band photos, posters, album covers and an interactive listening station where visitors can hear Long Ryders recordings. The exhibition is scheduled to continue to May 2025.

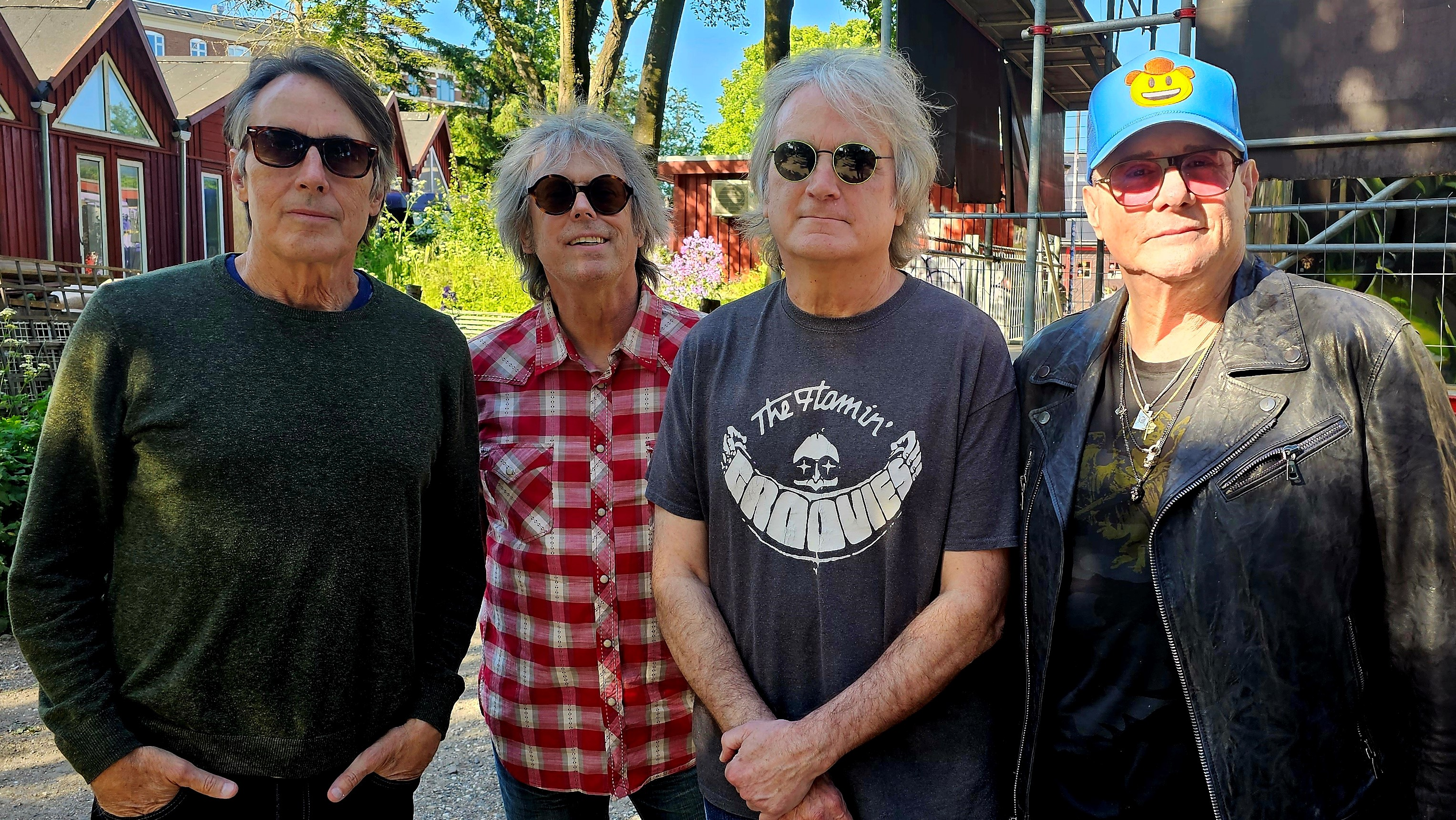
The Long Ryders in 2023. L to R: Stephen McCarthy, touring bassist Murry Hammond, Sid Griffin, Greg Sowders.

Recording sessions for the band's next studio album took place during summer 2022, followed by a six-date US tour in November. On these dates, the band was augmented by touring bassist Murry Hammond of Old 97's. On December 2, 2022, the band announced the release of their fifth studio album September November on March 10, 2023, released worldwide by Cherry Red. Like its predecessor, it was produced by Ed Stasium at his Kozy Tone Ranch studio in Poway, California, and features contributions from, among others, violinist Kerenza Peacock of the Coal Porters and X's D. J. Bonebrake on vibes. Bass duties on the album were shared by McCarthy and Hammond. The band – still including Hammond – set out on a European tour in May and June 2023, with a second leg planned for October. On September 15, 2023, the band released the three-track download-only Live EP – Copenhagen '23.

== Band members ==
Current members

- Sid Griffin – vocals, guitar, harmonica, mandolin, autoharp, mandocello, banjo, bugle (1982–1987, 2004, 2009, 2014, 2016–present)
- Stephen McCarthy – vocals, guitar, acoustic guitar, lap steel guitar, banjo, mandolin, bouzouki, bass, upright bass, keyboards, Mellotron (1982–1987, 2004, 2009, 2014, 2016–present)
- Greg Sowders – drums, percussion, vibraphone, keyboards, trombone (1982–1987, 2004, 2009, 2014, 2016–present)

Former members

- Barry Shank – bass (1982)
- Des Brewer – bass (1982–1983)
- Tom Stevens – vocals, bass, upright bass, guitar, acoustic guitar, cello (1983–1987, 2004, 2009, 2014, 2016–2021)

Touring musicians

- Don McCall – bass (1983)
- Larry Chatman – bass (1987)
- Simon Hancock – drums (2019)
- Murry Hammond – bass (2022–present)

== Discography ==
=== Studio albums ===
- Native Sons (1984, Frontier)
- State of Our Union (1985, Island)
- Two-Fisted Tales (1987, Island)
- Psychedelic Country Soul (2019, Cherry Red / Omnivore)
- September November (2023, Cherry Red)
- High Noon Hymns (2026, Cherry Red)

=== Live albums ===
- BBC Radio One Live in Concert (1994, Windsong)
- Three Minute Warnings: the Long Ryders Live in New York City (2003, Prima)
- State of Our Reunion (2004, Prima)

=== Compilations ===
- Metallic B.O. (1989, R.O.W.Y.C.O.)
- Looking for Lewis and Clark: the Long Ryders Anthology (1998, Chronicles)
- The Best of the Long Ryders (2004, Prima)
- Final Wild Songs (2016, Cherry Red)

=== Extended plays ===
- 10-5-60 (1983, PVC)
- Live EP – Copenhagen '23 (2023, Cherry Red) (Digital download)

=== Singles ===
Year	Single	Label and format	Tracks	Peak chart positions		Album
Year	Single	Label and format	Tracks	UK	UK Indie	Album
1984	"Tell It to the Judge on Sunday"	Lolita (France); 7"	"Tell It to the Judge on Sunday" [A] "Fair Game" [B]	—	—	Native Sons
1985	"I Had a Dream"	Zippo (UK); 7"	"I Had a Dream" [A] "Too Close to the Light (Buckskin Mix)" [B]	—	4	Native Sons
1985	"Looking for Lewis and Clark"	Island; 7", 10", 12"	"Looking for Lewis and Clark" [A] "Child Bride" [B] (non-album track) UK 10": "Looking for Lewis and Clark (Extended Version)" [A] "Child Bride" [B] "Southside of the Story" [B] (non-album track) "If I Were a Bramble and You Were a Rose" [B] (non-album track) US 12" promo: "Looking for Lewis and Clark" [A] "Lights of Downtown" [B]	59	—	State of Our Union
1986	"State of Our Union – Tour 86" (promo)	Ariola (Spain); 7"	"Looking for Lewis and Clark" [A] "Lights of Downtown" [A] "Here Comes That Train Again" [B] "State of My Union" [B]	—	—	State of Our Union
1987	"I Want You Bad"	Island; 7", 12"	"I Want You Bad" [A] "Ring Bells" [B] (non-album track) US 12" promo: "I Want You Bad" [A] "Ring Bells" [B] "State of My Union (Live)" [B] (non-album track)	—	—	Two-Fisted Tales
1987	"Gunslinger Man" (promo)	Ariola (Spain); Island (US); 7", 12"	"Gunslinger Man" [A] "I Want You Bad" [B] "Prairie Fire" [B] US 12" promo: "Gunslinger Man" (album version) [A] "Gunslinger Man" (album version) [B]	—	—	Two-Fisted Tales
2017	"Bear in the Woods"	Prima; Digital download	"Bear in the Woods"	—	—	Non-album single
2019	"Greenville"	Cherry Red / Omnivore; Digital download	"Greenville"	—	—	Psychedelic Country Soul
2019	"Molly Somebody"	Cherry Red / Omnivore; Digital download	"Molly Somebody"	—	—	Psychedelic Country Soul
2019	"Walls"	Cherry Red / Omnivore; Digital download	"Walls" (radio edit)	—	—	Psychedelic Country Soul
2020	"Down to the Well"	Prima; Digital download	"Down to the Well" "If You Want to See Me Cry (Dry Eye Remix)"	—	—	Non-album single
2022	"Tom Tom"	Prima; Digital download	"Tom Tom"	—	—	September November
2023	"September November Sometime"	Cherry Red; Digital download	"September November Sometime"	—	—	September November
2023	"Elmer Gantry Is Alive and Well"	Cherry Red; Digital download	"Elmer Gantry Is Alive and Well"	—	—	September November
2023	"Seasons Change"	Cherry Red; Digital download	"Seasons Change"	—	—	September November

=== Other appearances ===
Title	Year	Album	Notes
"Still Get By"	1983	The Radio Tokyo Tapes	Various artists compilation album; recorded at Radio Tokyo Studio, 1982.
"And She Rides"	1983	The Rebel Kind – A Collection of Contemporary Garage and Psychedelic Bands	Various artists compilation album; recorded at Radio Tokyo Studio, 1982.
"Christmas in New Zealand" (as the Spinning Wighats)	1985		7" flexi disc given away free as a fan club Christmas release and at a few selected gigs; recorded during the State of Our Union sessions, summer 1985.
"Encore From Hell" / "10-5-60" (Live) (as the Spinning Wighats)	1986		7" flexi disc given away free with issue 17 of Bucketfull of Brains magazine; recorded live at the Mean Fiddler, London, December 1985.
"Baby We All Gotta Go Down" (Live) (as the Spinning Wighats)	1986	What a Nice Way to Turn Seventeen No. 6	Given away free with issue 6 of What a Nice Way to Turn Seventeen fanzine, which combined a magazine with a full-length LP; recorded live at the Mean Fiddler, London, December 1985.
"I Can't Hide" (as the Spinning Wighats)	1986		7" flexi disc given away free with issue 28 of the Bob magazine; recorded at A&M Studios, Hollywood, February 1985.

=== DVDs ===
- Rockin' at the Roxy (2002, Classic Pictures Entertainment)
- State of Our Reunion (2009, Prima)
