= State of Our Union =

Studio album by The Long Ryders
- Released: September 1985
- Recorded: Summer 1985
- Studio: Chipping Norton Recording Studios, Oxfordshire, England
- Genre: Paisley Underground; garage rock; folk rock; country rock; alternative country
- Length: 41:30
- Label: Island
- Producer: Will Birch

The Long Ryders chronology
Native Sons (1984)	State of Our Union (1985)	Two-Fisted Tales (1987)

Singles from State of Our Union
- 1. "Looking for Lewis and Clark" Released: 23 September 1985

State of Our Union is the second studio album by American band the Long Ryders, released in September 1985 by Island Records. It was a success at college and alternative radio stations in the US and reached number 66 on the UK Albums Chart as well as number 2 on the UK Country Chart. The single "Looking for Lewis and Clark" peaked at number 59 on the UK Singles Chart but was never released commercially in the US.

Record Collector's Jon Harrington described State of Our Union as an album that "combined the country rock of the Flying Burrito Brothers, the jangle of the Byrds and Chuck Berry's rock'n'roll licks with the energy and snarl of the Clash."

== Background ==
After the success of their debut album Native Sons, released by Los Angeles-based independent record label Frontier Records in 1984, the Long Ryders signed a major label deal with Island Records in early summer 1985. During a European tour in the spring, the band had been approached by several A&R executives trying to convince them to sign with their label. Island Records UK won out, and after the tour, the band returned home to the US to write songs, record demos and look for a producer.

They chose British producer Will Birch, after a few other candidates were eliminated, including Nick Lowe and Dave Edmunds. Birch had been the drummer of power pop band the Records, a band the Long Ryders all admired. Most of the songs had been written and demoed by July, and the recording sessions for the album commenced in late summer at Chipping Norton Recording Studios in Oxfordshire, England. "Capturing the Flag", co-written by the band and their producer, was written during final rehearsals for the sessions, when Birch suggested to write one more strong song for the album. "Christmas in New Zealand" was recorded during the album sessions and released as a 7" flexi disc under the pseudonym the Spinning Wig Hats. It was given away at a few selected gigs.

"This album has country elements, but not as pronounced as on Native Sons", said guitarist Sid Griffin in 1985. He described a song like "Looking for Lewis and Clark" as "a chord being beaten into submission" – something that he didn't get from likes of Merle Haggard or the Byrds, he said. He would get it from punk bands like the Ramones, the Clash and Circle Jerks, and the Stooges' Funhouse album. "That's our bag, as it were. That weirdness and energy played on country and western instruments."

== Reception ==
Professional ratings
Review scores
Source	Rating
AllMusic	4/5 stars
Americana UK	10/10
Robert Christgau	B+
Classic Rock	8/10 stars
Record Collector	4/5 stars
Scottish Daily Express	4/5 stars
Shindig!	4/5 stars

Although State of Our Union was popular at college and alternative radio stations in the US and entered both the UK Albums and Country Chart, the album didn't please UK critics as much as the Long Ryders' debut album Native Sons. Many reviews in the British press were negative, as documented on the live recording "Encore from Hell" where singer Sid Griffin reads out reviews of State of Our Union at a gig in London in December 1985. "There are 10 things wrong with this album," begins the Oxford Mail, "and they’re all the songs." The Northern Echo wrote, "If these guys are at the helm of West Coast rock, abandon ship." One reviewer settled for "three-chord horseshit".

Retrospective reviews were generally positive. Jack Leaver, writing for AllMusic, rated the album 4 stars out of 5, saying that the band's previous release "had already made it clear that the Long Ryders knew how to make great rock & roll, but State of Our Union suggested they had a lot else on their minds". He felt that the album's production gave the songs "a poppier sheen that still allowed the band's roots-conscious sound to shine through." Leaver noted that "Lyrically, State of Our Union took a long look at Reagan-era America as the gulf between the rich and the poor began to divide the nation ... exploring issues of economic injustice, and even the less obvious political songs often having a progressive subtext."

Giving it 10 out of 10, Americana UK called the album "one of the finest ever releases in the genre that didn’t yet know it was called Americana", and added that it "sounds as fine today as it did in 1985".

Music and culture fanzine God Is In The TV, called it "the band's strongest overall album".

Trouser Press was less favorable in their assessment of the album, calling it "a big disappointment" and "an occasionally corny collection of weak melodies, inane lyrics and misguided arrangements."

== Track listing ==
Adapted from the album's liner notes.

No.	Title	Writer(s)	Length
1.	"Looking for Lewis and Clark"	Sid Griffin	3:09
2.	"Lights of Downtown"	Stephen McCarthy	3:11
3.	"WDIA"	Griffin, McCarthy	3:44
4.	"Mason-Dixon Line"	McCarthy	4:23
5.	"Here Comes That Train Again"	McCarthy	3:24
6.	"Years Long Ago"	Tom Stevens	3:39
7.	"Good Times Tomorrow, Hard Times Today"	Griffin	3:58
8.	"Two Kinds of Love"	Griffin	4:20
9.	"You Just Can't Ride the Boxcars Anymore"	Stevens	3:02
10.	"Capturing the Flag"	Griffin, McCarthy, Stevens, Greg Sowders, Will Birch	3:52
11.	"State of My Union"	Griffin, Sowders	4:48

1990 CD bonus tracks
No.	Title	Writer(s)	Length
12.	"If I Were a Bramble and You Were a Rose" (B-side)	Griffin	4:49
13.	"Southside of the Story" (B-side)	Griffin, Stevens	3:21
14.	"Child Bride" (B-side)	McCarthy, Sowders	2:47
15.	"Christmas in New Zealand" (7" flexi disc)	Griffin, McCarthy, Stevens, Sowders	3:35

=== 2018 expanded edition ===
The first disc of the expanded edition contains the fifteen tracks from the 1990 CD version.

Disc two: Demos
No.	Title	Writer(s)	Length
1.	"Good Times Tomorrow, Hard Times Today"	Griffin
2.	"Mason-Dixon Line"	McCarthy
3.	"South Side of the Story"	Griffin, Stevens
4.	"State of My Union"	Griffin, Sowders
5.	"Lights of Downtown"	McCarthy
6.	"Child Bride"	McCarthy, Sowders
7.	"Looking for Lewis and Clark"	Griffin
8.	"Two Kinds of Love"	Griffin
9.	"WDIA"	Griffin, McCarthy
10.	"Here Comes That Train Again"	McCarthy
11.	"You Just Can’t Ride the Boxcars Anymore"	Stevens
12.	"Years Long Ago"	Stevens

- Tracks 1–11 recorded July 1985 by Rick Novak at Control Center, Los Angeles, California; track 12 recorded June 1985 by Larry Stutzman at Larry's Pro Sound, Burbank, California.

Disc three: Live at the Mean Fiddler
No.	Title	Writer(s)	Length
1.	"Tell It to the Judge on Sunday"	Griffin
2.	"Still Get By"	McCarthy
3.	"You Just Can’t Ride the Boxcars Anymore"	Stevens
4.	"Good Times Tomorrow"	Griffin
5.	"Wreck of the 809"	McCarthy, Stevens
6.	"Lights of Downtown"	McCarthy
7.	"Run Dusty Run"	Griffin, Sowders
8.	"Years Long Ago"	Stevens
9.	"Capturing the Flag"	Griffin, McCarthy, Stevens, Sowders, Birch
10.	"I Had a Dream"	McCarthy
11.	"Final Wild Son"	Griffin, McCarthy
12.	"Baby, We All Gotta Go Down"	Dan Stuart, Steve Wynn
13.	"State of My Union"	Griffin, Sowders
14.	"Sweet Mental Revenge"	Mel Tillis
15.	"Looking for Lewis and Clark"	Griffin
16.	"Send Me a Postcard"	Stuart, Wynn
17.	"Highway 61 Revisited"	Bob Dylan
18.	"Encore from Hell"	Griffin, McCarthy, Stevens, Sowders
19.	"10-5-60"	Griffin, Barry Shank

- Recorded live at the Mean Fiddler, Harlesden, London, on the Ronnie Lane Mobile, 8 December 1985; all tracks are previously unreleased, except for "Baby, We All Gotta Go Down" and "Encore from Hell".

== Personnel ==
Adapted from the album's liner notes.

The Long Ryders

- Sid Griffin – vocals, guitar, harmonica, autoharp
- Stephen McCarthy – vocals, guitar, banjo, lap steel guitar
- Tom Stevens – vocals, electric and acoustic bass
- Greg Sowders – drums, percussion, keyboards

Additional musicians

- Snake Davis and his Longhorns – saxophone on "WDIA"
- Vic Collins – pedal steel guitar on "WDIA"
- Alan Dunn – accordion on "Child Bride"
- Steve Wickham – violin on "If I Were a Bramble and You Were a Rose"
- Christine Collister – vocals on "If I Were a Bramble and You Were a Rose"

Technical

- Will Birch – producer
- Neill King – engineer
- Mike Prior – front cover photography
- Dorothea Lange – back cover photography
- Andy Pearce – remastering (2018 reissue)
- Matt Wortham – remastering (2018 reissue)
- Tom Stevens – compilation, liner notes (2018 reissue)
- Stephen Hammonds – product manager (2018 reissue)
- Philip Lloyd-Smee – design (2018 reissue)

== Chart positions ==
Chart (1985)	Peak position
UK Albums Chart	66
UK Country Chart	2
