= 10-5-60 =

EP by The Long Ryders
- Released: September 1983
- Studio: Earle's Garage, Thousand Oaks, California
- Genre: Paisley Underground; garage rock; psychedelia; folk rock; country rock
- Length: 17:35
- Label: PVC
- Producer: Earle Mankey; The Long Ryders

The Long Ryders chronology
10-5-60 (1983)	Native Sons (1984)

10-5-60 is an EP and the first release by American band the Long Ryders. It was released in September 1983 by PVC Records and preceded the bands full-length debut album Native Sons.

== Background and musical style ==
The Long Ryders had funded the recording sessions for 10-5-60 themselves and managed to secure a deal with the import and distribution label Jem Records. Jem agreed to take on distribution and release the EP on their sublabel PVC in late 1983. Long Ryder guitarist Sid Griffin: "I was working there so I got us on the in-house label, and they did it as a favour. ... it did really well, and they couldn't believe it – they did it as a sop to me." 10-5-60 was produced by former Sparks guitarist Earle Mankey with the Long Ryders at Mankey's home based studio Earle's Garage in California. The EP brought the Long Ryders immediate notice and was a success on US college radio. "The people in the Gavin Report in San Francisco, a national radio tip sheet, really liked it", Griffin said. "This was a national professional tip sheet which was normally worried about people like Donna Summer and Billy Joel and Survivor and all those kind of acts that were mega popular in the 1980s. I had no idea of the impact that the Gavin Report writing about 10-5-60 had."

The Long Ryders were initially linked with the neo-psychedelia of the Los Angeles Paisley Underground scene, and 10-5-60 shows influences ranging from garage rock and psychedelia to Byrdsian folk and country rock. In 2016, the Guardian's Michael Hann described the EP as "deeply indebted to the 60s". In his book Country Roads: How Country Came to Nashville, musicologist Brian Hinton writes, "the band's punkish roots are sweetened by banjo, steel guitar and autoharp, and that Byrdsian propulsion is firmly on the launch pad. They are not played gently, though, and the vocals are the very antithesis of Nashville cool. If Gram Parsons approached country with respect, this is a full-tilt drunken assault."

The cover, with its 1960s look echoing old Byrds promo shots, was shot by noted punk rock photographer Ed Colver. "The stark front cover caused heads to turn at the Gavin Report and Billboard, as the Long Ryders looked so unlike the synth-pop acts of the era," Griffin said. The idea behind the cover, according to Griffin, "was me and photographer Ed Colver deciding to send a signal ... I always bought anything I saw if it looked '66." Colver also subsequently shot the cover for the band's Native Sons album.

== Reception ==
Professional ratings
Review scores
Source	Rating
AllMusic	3/5 stars
Robert Christgau	B
Encyclopedia of Popular Music	3/5 stars
The Great Rock Discography	6/10

10-5-60 was well received by critics in both the US and the UK. At the time of release, critic Robert Christgau gave it a B rating, stating: "What Jason & the Scorchers are to punk these guys are to new wave, with a soul Gram Parsons fans will recognize." In a retrospective review, AllMusic's Mark Deming rated it three stars out of five, noting the Long Ryders' obvious affection for the Byrds, but adding that "they sound less like a throwback than some vintage band who somehow passed through a wrinkle in time and ended up in 1983." He also called the title track one of "the most exciting performances to come out of the '80s garage revival."

== Track listing ==
No.	Title	Writer(s)	Length
1.	"Join My Gang"	Sid Griffin	2:44
2.	"I Don't Care What's Right, I Don't Care What's Wrong"	Steve McCarthy, Des Brewer	4:03
3.	"10-5-60"	Griffin, Barry Shank	3:11
4.	"And She Rides"	Griffin, Greg Sowders	4:30
5.	"Born to Believe in You"	Griffin	3:07
Total length:			17:35

1987 Zippo reissue
No.	Title	Writer(s)	Length
1.	"Join My Gang"	Griffin	2:44
2.	"I Don't Care What's Right, I Don't Care What's Wrong"	McCarthy, Brewer	4:03
3.	"10-5-60"	Griffin, Shank	3:11
4.	"The Trip" (Bonus track)	McCarthy	2:42
5.	"And She Rides"	Griffin, Sowders	4:30
6.	"Born to Believe in You"	Griffin	3:07
Total length:			20:17

== Personnel ==
Credits are adapted from the EP liner notes.

The Long Ryders

- Sid Griffin – guitar, autoharp, harmonica, vocals
- Steve McCarthy – guitar, steel guitar, banjo, mandolin, keyboards, vocals
- Des Brewer – bass, vocals
- Greg Sowders – drums, percussion

Production

- Earle Mankey – producer, engineer
- The Long Ryders – producer
- Ed Colver – cover photography
- Heather Harris – art direction
- Bill Inglot – digital remastering (1987 reissue)

Note

- "The Trip" was recorded in February 1985 at A&M Studios in Hollywood, California with Tom Stevens on bass, having replaced Des Brewer in late 1983.

== Rerelease ==
10-5-60 was reissued on vinyl in 1987 by the British Zippo label, adding the bonus track, "The Trip". The 10-5-60 tracks (including "The Trip") were later added as bonus tracks on CD reissues of the album Native Sons.
