= Native Sons (The Long Ryders album) =

Studio album by the Long Ryders
- Released: October 1984
- Recorded: Summer 1984
- Studio: A&M (Hollywood)
- Genre: Paisley Underground; garage rock; folk rock; country rock; alternative country
- Length: 33:18
- Label: Frontier
- Producer: Henry Lewy; Paul McKenna

The Long Ryders chronology
10-5-60 (1983)	Native Sons (1984)	State of Our Union (1985)

Singles from Native Sons
- 1. "Tell It to the Judge on Sunday" Released: 1984; 2. "I Had a Dream" Released: 25 March 1985

Native Sons is the debut album by American band the Long Ryders, released in October 1984 by record label Frontier. The album and the single "I Had a Dream" reached number 1 and 4 on the UK Indie Chart, respectively. Musically, the album fuses 1960s style garage rock and folk rock with country rock. Rolling Stone's David Fricke described Native Sons as an album "where Nashville, ’77 London and the mid-Sixties Sunset Strip converge in songs of pioneer aspiration and outlaw bonding." Native Sons features former Byrds member Gene Clark guesting on the track "Ivory Tower".

== Recording and musical style ==
Native Sons was recorded at A&M Studios in Los Angeles during the 1984 Summer Olympics that took place in the city between July 28 and August 12. The Long Ryders had learned that the studio was available at a rock-bottom rate, because A&M was concerned that no artists would want to record during the Olympics. As the album's co-producer with A&M engineer Paul McKenna, the Long Ryders chose veteran producer Henry Lewy, whose past credits includes engineering Eddie Cochran's "Summertime Blues" and multiple albums by Joni Mitchell and co-producing an album with Leonard Cohen, as well as the first Flying Burrito Brothers album. Guitarist Stephen McCarthy told Billboard magazine in 1984 that the Long Ryders didn't set out to capture the Burrito Brothers' sound in the studio, although they certainly respected the band's work. "We have a feel for American roots music," McCarthy said, "and we just want to sound like a real American band." In 2019, guitarist Sid Griffin said of Native Sons: "Psychedelia was toned down save the atmospheric "Close to the Light" and country, bluegrass and Sun Records rock and roll was emphasized."

The album marks the debut of bassist Tom Stevens, who had joined the band in January 1984. In 2004, he talked to the Lama Workshop website about the Long Ryders' musical transition from the 10-5-60 EP to Native Sons: "From the start the Long Ryders were all about hybrids of pure American styles of music, as mostly defined by 1960s bands, both rock and country. That all distilled through skilled songwriting into more of the classic style that you hear on Native Sons."

== Songs ==
"Final Wild Son" is a lyrical homage to Jerry Lee Lewis, and the title is a phrase taken from Nick Tosches' 1982 biography of Lewis, Hellfire. Matthew Greenwald of AllMusic described "Run Dusty Run" as an "episodic tale of desperation, gambling, and romance on the run." In the liner notes for the Final Wild Songs box set, Sid Griffin wrote of "Run Dusty Run": "Stephen [McCarthy] channels Carl Wilson's "Fun, Fun, Fun" solo and the NME is amazed he updated "the Chuck Berry lick" to the punk era. Any song about a horse race is fine with me."

"Ivory Tower" was written by original bassist Barry Shank, who left the band in 1982 prior to their recording career. Al Campbell of AllMusic called it "the greatest song the Byrds never wrote and one of the most sincere tributes to that band's sound." Matthew Greenwald concurred, calling it "possibly one of the finest folk rock efforts of the mid-1980s." Greenwald felt that it "sounds like a brilliant outtake from Turn! Turn! Turn!, but the band's overall vitality makes it wholly new and original as well." He also felt that it was "heavily influenced by the densely packed wordplay utilized by Gene Clark during the early Byrds career." Clark himself guests on the track, adding a harmony vocal to Stephen McCarthy's lead. "Gene was someone we all really admired," drummer Greg Sowders told The Spill Magazine in 2019. "He was around in LA, and we all knew him," he said. In 2013, Tom Stevens recalled the recording session with Clark: "We all gathered in the control booth with our producer Henry Lewy, listening to Gene sing. There was that beautiful voice I heard so many years ago. But now it was tired and damaged by too much that still rode with him, whether he wanted it to or not. Somebody compared his earliest attempts at getting a take to the vocalisms of Wild Man Fischer. Gene's vocal, doubling a previously-recorded one by Stephen McCarthy, had to be recorded over and over again, but finally we got something that truly added to the song. That quality I recognized years ago was still intact." According to Barry Shank in the liner notes for Final Wild Songs, "Ivory Tower" began as a homage to the Beau Brummels' "Laugh, Laugh", but became more Byrds-like after he left the band and Stephen McCarthy started singing it.

Originally recorded by Mel Tillis in 1966, "(Sweet) Mental Revenge" was discovered by Sid Griffin in 1983 on a Flying Burrito Brothers bootleg tape recorded in 1969. Matthew Greenwald wrote that the Long Ryders' performance "sounds not unlike the Flying Burrito Brothers on steroids," adding that "an air of humor in the melody juxtaposes one of the ultimate kiss-off songs of all time, as well as the bitter undercurrent of the lyrics." The song features Dave Pearlman, known for his work with Dan Fogelberg, Phil Everly and Hoyt Axton, on steel guitar.

"Fair Game" was written in the style of the Everly Brothers, according to Sid Griffin, and a staple of the Long Ryders' acoustic shows at the time. In the liner notes for Final Wild Songs, Griffin wrote about the origin of "Tell It to the Judge on Sunday": "Back in Kentucky I saw a guy walk up to a county judge to ask him something one Sunday afternoon. The judge replied, "Son, you don't tell nuthin' to a judge on a Sunday." I guess it doesn't take much to inspire me." Veteran British session musician Phil Kenzie plays tenor and baritone saxophone on the track.

Joe Sasf of the Washington Post wrote that the "death" ballad "Wreck of the 809" "convincingly reaches back past the 1950s, deep into America's folk heritage, recalling "Wreck of the Old 97," one of the first rural songs to be recorded." Tom Stevens: "Probably half to two-thirds of the songs on Native Sons were already written by the time I joined, but I got in just in time to write the words and melody to "Wreck of the 809", for which Stephen already had the chords, and "Too Close to the Light"’s "taught us how the wrong could be right" part." According to Matthew Greenwald, "Too Close to the Light" is "one of the most ambitious recordings of the Long Ryders' catalog." It moves through "several vastly diverse musical movements" and "combines an almost Kinks-inspired hard rock riff with some gorgeous, modal verses." He also noted the song's "exquisite harmonies", which he called "some of the finest in the band's career." According to Sid Griffin, the band downplayed the psychedelic side of their music on Native Sons, "but this slipped through the net," he said.

Griffin's personal favorite from the band's catalog, "I Had a Dream", was described by Matthew Greenwald as "an extremely well-arranged and performed track including chiming 12-strings, distorted six-strings, and a positively devastating performance from the rhythm section." He felt that the song brings together the band's different influences from rock, punk, and country. "What sounded like a personal relationship was really about two countries and their willingness to annihilate each other at the expense of their citizens," McCarthy, the song's writer, explained.

== Album cover ==
Buffalo Springfield's Stampede cover

The album cover is a recreation of the abandoned Buffalo Springfield album, Stampede, which was set to be released as their second album in 1967, going as far as to have a cover photo taken. The photo for Native Sons was shot by noted punk rock photographer Ed Colver who had also shot the cover for the band's 10-5-60 EP as well as covers for Black Flag and Bad Religion.

== Release ==
Native Sons was released in the US in October 1984 by Los Angeles-based independent record label Frontier Records. For the album's UK release in March 1985, the Long Ryders signed a distribution deal with London's Demon Records who released it through their Zippo sublabel. Zippo also released "I Had a Dream" as a UK-only single, while French label Lolita released "Tell It to the Judge on Sunday" in France.

Native Sons was reissued on CD in 1987 and 1992 through Zippo and Frontier, respectively, and included the band's 1983 10-5-60 EP as bonus tracks. In 2011, Sid Griffin's Prima Records released a deluxe reissue of the album, which included 10-5-60, the Radio Tokyo demos (named after the studio they were recorded in), and tracks from an abandoned album titled 5x5.

An expanded 3CD edition was released in January 2024 by Cherry Red Records, again featuring 10-5-60, the Radio Tokyo demos, and the 5x5 session tracks plus previously unreleased demos from the era and a 1985 live recording.

== Reception ==
Professional ratings
Review scores
Source	Rating
AllMusic	4.5/5 stars
Robert Christgau	B+
Classic Rock	8/10 stars
Mojo	3/5 stars
R2	5/5 stars
Record Collector	4/5 stars
Trouser Press	favorable
Uncut	4/5 stars

Described as "a modern American classic" by Melody Maker, Native Sons received strong reviews from critics at the time of release. It did especially well in the UK where, according to Mark Deming of AllMusic, "the group's take on American musical traditions, mixed with a progressive lyrical viewpoint, clicked with critics." Joe Sasf of The Washington Post noted the 1960s folk rock and country rock influence in the band's sound, writing that the band "seize upon the stylistic legacies and invigorate them with their own impressively varied songwriting and instrumental skills." Sid Griffin said in 2019: "Native Sons was the #4 album on the [US] college radio/indie charts. Back then, this meant radio airplay, record sales and positive reviews in every newspaper in the country."

Contemporary reviews were positive. Al Campbell of AllMusic praised the album, writing that it "established their eclectic mixture of Byrds/Clash/Flying Burrito Brothers' influences ... while turning in an original sound that became the banner for both the paisley underground and cowpunk styles in the mid-'80s." He concluded that "on Native Sons, the Long Ryders pioneered a musical design that future alternative roots rockers would use as a manual." Trouser Press described the album as "a stirring dose of memorable and unpretentious country rock that incorporates Highway 61 Revisited Dylan, paisley pop, Kingston Trio balladry and wild rock'n'roll." Rob Hughes, writing for Uncut felt that the album's production was kept "authentically raw" without "any hint of 1980s sweetener", which made the Long Ryders seem "urgent, primal, like a new breed of country-garage band." Gerry Ranson of R2 magazine called it an "essential purchase".

== Track listing ==
Adapted from the album's liner notes.

No.	Title	Writer(s)	Length
1.	"Final Wild Son"	Sid Griffin, Stephen McCarthy	2:35
2.	"Still Get By"	McCarthy	2:50
3.	"Ivory Tower"	Barry Shank	3:00
4.	"Run Dusty Run"	Griffin, Greg Sowders	2:24
5.	"(Sweet) Mental Revenge"	Mel Tillis	2:50
6.	"Fair Game"	Griffin, McCarthy	2:35
7.	"Tell It to the Judge on Sunday"	Griffin	3:06
8.	"Wreck of the 809"	McCarthy, Tom Stevens	3:54
9.	"Too Close to the Light"	Griffin, McCarthy, Stevens, Sowders	4:00
10.	"Never Got to Meet the Mom"	Griffin	2:14
11.	"I Had a Dream"	McCarthy	3:50
Total length:			33:18

1987 and 1992 CD bonus tracks
No.	Title	Writer(s)	Length
12.	"Join My Gang" (10-5-60 EP)	Griffin	2:49
13.	"You Don't Know What's Right, You Don't Know What's Wrong" (10-5-60 EP)	McCarthy, Des Brewer	4:03
14.	"10-5-60" (10-5-60 EP)	Griffin, Shank	3:12
15.	"The Trip" (10-5-60 EP, 1987 reissue)	McCarthy	2:39
16.	"And She Rides" (10-5-60 EP)	Griffin, Sowders	4:33
17.	"Born to Believe in You" (10-5-60 EP)	Griffin	3:08
Total length:			54:02

2011 deluxe reissue bonus tracks
No.	Title	Writer(s)	Length
12.	"Join My Gang" (10-5-60 EP)	Griffin	2:49
13.	"You Don't Know What's Right, You Don't Know What's Wrong" (10-5-60 EP)	McCarthy, Brewer	4:03
14.	"10-5-60" (10-5-60 EP)	Griffin, Shank	3:12
15.	"Born to Believe in You" (10-5-60 EP)	Griffin	3:08
16.	"The Trip" (10-5-60 EP, 1987 reissue)	McCarthy	2:39
17.	"And She Rides" (10-5-60 EP)	Griffin, Sowders	4:33
18.	"Time Keeps Travelling" (5x5 sessions)	Griffin	3:37
19.	"I Can't Hide" (5x5 sessions)	Cyril Jordan, Chris Wilson	3:11
20.	"Masters of War" (5x5 sessions)	Bob Dylan	4:33
21.	"Still Get By" (Radio Tokyo demo sessions)	McCarthy	2:53
22.	"10-5-60" (Radio Tokyo demo sessions)	Griffin, Shank	3:06
23.	"And She Rides" (Radio Tokyo demo sessions)	Griffin, Sowders	4:00
24.	"Too Close to the Light" (Buckskin Mix) (B-side of UK-only single "I Had a Dream")	Griffin, McCarthy, Stevens, Sowders	3:55
Total length:			79:49

=== 2024 expanded 3CD edition ===
Disc one – bonus tracks

10-5-60 EP
No.	Title	Writer(s)	Length
12.	"Join My Gang"	Griffin	2:47
13.	"You Don't Know What's Right, You Don’t Know What's Wrong"	McCarthy, Brewer	4:02
14.	"10-5-60"	Griffin, Shank	3:10
15.	"Born to Believe in You"	Griffin	3:07
16.	"And She Rides"	Griffin, Sowders	4:32

B-side
No.	Title	Writer(s)	Length
17.	"Close to the Light" (Buckskin Mix)	Griffin, McCarthy, Stevens, Sowders	3:55

5x5 sessions
No.	Title	Writer(s)	Length
18.	"The Trip"	McCarthy	2:36
19.	"Time Keeps Travelling"	Griffin	3:19
20.	"I Can't Hide"	Jordan, Wilson	3:06
21.	"As God Is My Witness"	Griffin	3:31
22.	"Masters of War"	Dylan	4:06
Total length:			71:57

Disc two

Radio Tokyo demos
No.	Title	Writer(s)	Length
1.	"10-5-60"	Griffin, Shank	3:07
2.	"And She Rides"	Griffin, Sowders	4:02
3.	"Still Get By"	McCarthy	2:53

Native Sons demos
No.	Title	Writer(s)	Length
4.	"Final Wild Son"	Griffin, McCarthy	2:36
5.	"Run Dusty Run"	Griffin, Sowders	2:27
6.	"Ivory Tower"	Shank	3:03
7.	"Tell It to the Judge on Sunday"	Griffin	3:11
8.	"Wreck of the 809"	McCarthy, Stevens	4:00
9.	"I'll Get Out Somehow"	McCarthy	3:46
10.	"(Sweet) Mental Revenge"	Tillis	2:57
11.	"Never Got to Meet the Mom"	Griffin	2:19
12.	"Too Close to the Light"	Griffin, McCarthy, Stevens, Sowders	4:46
13.	"Still Get By"	McCarthy	2:50
14.	"I Had a Dream"	McCarthy	3:39
15.	"The Trip"	McCarthy	3:00
16.	"Time Keeps Traveling"	Griffin	3:10
17.	"Masters of War"	Dylan	4:23
18.	"If I Were a Carpenter"	Tim Hardin	4:39
19.	"Fair Game"	Griffin, McCarthy	2:33
Total length:			63:23

Disc three

Live at Dingwalls
No.	Title	Writer(s)	Length
1.	"Join My Gang"	Griffin	2:07
2.	"I Can't Hide"	Jordan, Wilson	3:11
3.	"Ivory Tower"	Shank	3:20
4.	"I Had a Dream"	McCarthy	3:42
5.	"Masters of War"	Dylan	4:05
6.	"Final Wild Son"	Griffin, McCarthy	2:56
7.	"(Sweet) Mental Revenge"	Tillis	2:45
8.	"Run Dusty Run"	Griffin, Sowders	2:22
9.	"Mason-Dixon Line"	McCarthy	4:11
10.	"Southside of the Story"	Griffin, Stevens	2:52
11.	"Wreck of the 809"	McCarthy, Stevens	3:56
12.	"State of My Union"	Griffin, Sowders	4:30
13.	"Still Get By"	McCarthy	2:49
14.	"Tell It to the Judge on Sunday"	Griffin	3:38
Total length:			46:26

Notes

- Radio Tokyo demo sessions recorded in 1982 at Radio Tokyo Studio, Venice, California.
- 10-5-60 EP recorded in 1983 at Earle's Garage, Thousand Oaks, California.
- 5x5 sessions recorded in February 1985 at A&M Studios, Hollywood, California.
- Disc three recorded live at Dingwalls, London, March 22, 1985.

== Personnel ==
Adapted from the album's liner notes.

The Long Ryders

- Sid Griffin – guitar, harmonica, autoharp, bugle, vocals
- Stephen McCarthy – guitar, steel guitar, keyboards, mandolin, banjo, vocals
- Tom Stevens – bass, standup bass, vocals
- Greg Sowders – drums, percussion, vibraphone

Additional musicians

- Gene Clark – additional vocals on "Ivory Tower"
- Dave Pearlman – steel guitar on "(Sweet) Mental Revenge"
- Phil Kenzie – tenor and baritone saxophone on "Tell It to the Judge on Sunday"
- Des Brewer – bass, vocals on 10-5-60 EP and Radio Tokyo sessions

Technical

- Henry Lewy – producer, engineer
- Paul McKenna – producer, engineer; engineer (5x5 sessions)
- Earle Mankey – producer, engineer (10-5-60 EP)
- The Long Ryders – producer (′10-5-60 EP and 5x5 sessions)
- Ethan James – producer, engineer (Radio Tokyo demo sessions)
- Ed Colver – photography

== Chart positions ==
Chart (1984)	Peak position
UK Indie Chart	1
