= Davie Allan =

American guitarist (active 1963– )

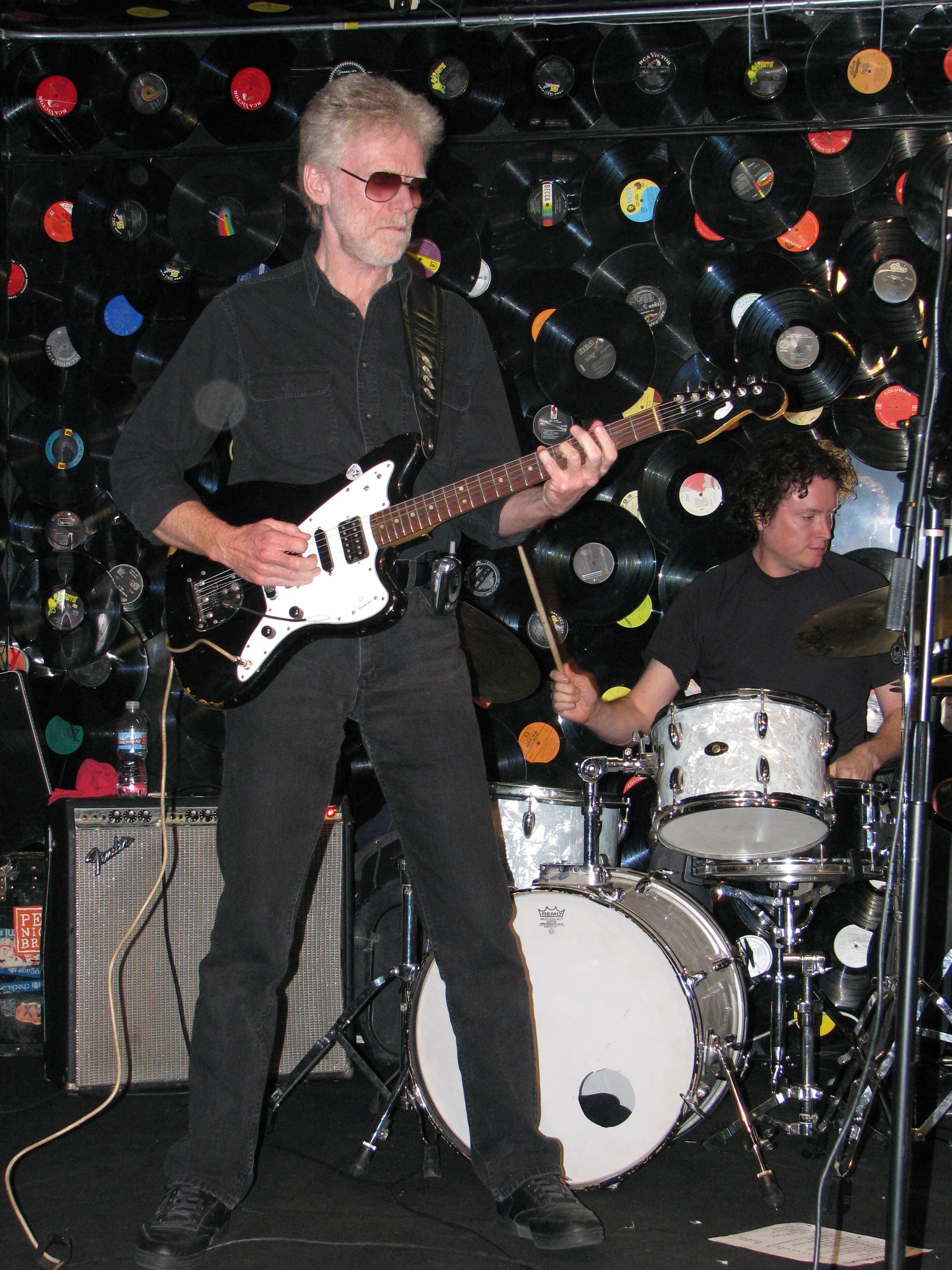
- Davie Allan live at Red Planet Records

Background information
- Born: June 8, 1944 (age 81); Los Angeles, California
- Origin: United States of America
- Education: Ulysses S. Grant High School
- Occupation: musician
- Instrument: guitar
- Years active: 1963–present
- Label: MGM Records
- Member of: Davie Allan and The Arrows
- Website: davieallan.com

Davie Allan is an American musician, best known for his work on soundtracks to various teen and biker movies in the 1960s. Allan's backing band is almost always the Arrows (i.e., Davie Allan & the Arrows), although the Arrows have never had a stable lineup.

== Biography ==
Allan grew up in the San Fernando Valley in Southern California, and learned to play guitar as a teenager. His career as a musician began when he teamed up with Mike Curb, a friend he met in the choir at Grant High School in Valley Glen, California, to form an instrumental surf combo. In 1963, Curb founded Curb Records, the first of many labels he would run, and released the first Davie Allan single, “War Path”. Allan participated in recording a number of other singles for Curb's label, under group names like the Sudells, the Heyburners, and the Zanies.

In 1964, Curb founded Sidewalk Records (which was distributed by Capitol subsidiary Tower Records), brought Allan with him as a session musician, and secured a recording contract for the newly formed Arrows. Curb had also made a deal to supply Roger Corman's American International Pictures with soundtracks. Allan had come to Corman's attention from his playing on the soundtrack of Skaterdater.

== Davie Allan and The Arrows ==
Early Davie Allan and The Arrows tracks were stereotypical instrumental surf numbers, with clear-as-a-bell guitar sounds and light, crisp drum work. Though these sides were good musically, and modestly successful commercially (“Apache '65” became a local radio hit), Allan would find his greatest success when his sound mutated soon thereafter.

When Curb assigned soundtrack duties for biker film The Wild Angels to Allan and the Arrows, it would prove a breakthrough success. The song from the film's opening, "Blue's Theme", an aggressive, repetitive and very catchy instrumental showcasing Allan's new fuzz (heavily distorted) guitar sound became their biggest hit (it was also one of the first songs Eddie Van Halen learned to play on brother Alex's guitar). The song stayed on the Billboard charts for 17 weeks (it peaked at #37) (#36 in Canada). The single, backed with “Bongo Party”, and the soundtrack album both sold well. Rumors have stated that the melody in "Blue's Theme" was stolen from Louie Shelton's guitar lick in "Last Train to Clarksville", but "Last Train to Clarksville" was recorded on July 25, 1966, while The Wild Angels debuted in the theaters on July 20, 1966.

Davie Allan & the Arrows recorded a number of other soundtracks for similar AIP films over the next few years, like Devil's Angels, Thunder Alley, and The Born Losers, as well as several studio albums. None proved as successful as "Blue's Theme".

By the time Tower Records and Sidewalk Records were dissolved in 1968, Allan had his name on some 14 albums and a string of singles. Allan cut a few singles for MGM Records in the early '70s, continuing his association with Curb, but after that his career faltered.

== Career revival ==
Beginning with the Loud, Loose and Savage album in 1994, a compilation of tracks recorded over the previous 10 years, Allan (with all-new Arrows in tow) began a bid to revive his career. The album was well received by critics, and since then he has released several more albums, including a collaboration with the Phantom Surfers, Ramonetures, an album of instrumental versions of Ramones songs, done Ventures-style. A follow-up album by the Ramonetures features Ventures-infused instrumental covers of songs by X. Featuring the playing of DJ Bonebrake and Billy Zoom of X, the album's title, Johnny Walk Don't Run Paulene, is a portmanteau of well-known songs by X ("Johnny hit & run Paulene") and the Ventures ("Walk don't run").

The band Danzig recorded a cover of "Devil's Angels", which is the lead track on the covers album Skeletons. Singer Glenn Danzig has said he had been wanting to cover the song since 1979, so the version is in the style of his band of that era, the Misfits.

== Musical legacy ==
Allan's most notable contribution is popularizing the fuzz-guitar sound using the then recently invented fuzzbox, which made its popular debut on "(I Can't Get No) Satisfaction". While Link Wray was the pioneer of guitar distortion, Allan pushed it to a new level, distorting his signal enough to give his guitar tone a buzzing, grinding quality: "fuzzy". Guitar sounds along similar lines would become a staple of 1970s rock, and Allan's penchant for extreme, heavy, noisy guitar work displayed on tracks like "Devil's Rumble", "Cycle-Delic" and "King Fuzz" presaged 1980s acts like Sonic Youth.

== Discography ==
=== Singles ===
All singles by Davie Allan & The Arrows except as noted

Year	Titles (A-side, B-side) Both sides from same album except where indicated	US Billboard	Album
1964	"War Path" b/w "Beyond the Blues"; Davie Allan solo		Non-album tracks
1965	"Apache '65" b/w "Blue Guitar"	64	Apache '65
1965	"Dance the Freddie" b/w "Moon Dawg '65" (Non-album track)		Apache '65
1965	"Baby Ruth" b/w "I'm Looking Over a Four Leaf Clover"		Non-album tracks
1965	"Space Hop" b/w "Granny Goose"		Non-album tracks
1966	"Theme From The Wild Angels" b/w "U.F.O." (Non-album track)	99	The Wild Angels soundtrack
1966	"Blue's Theme" b/w "Bongo Party"	37	The Wild Angels soundtrack
1967	"Devil's Angels" b/w "Cody's Theme"	97	Devil's Angels soundtrack
1968	"Blue Rides Again" b/w "Cycle-Delic" (from Cycle-Delic Sounds)		Non-album track
1968	"Shape of Things to Come" b/w "Wild in the Streets"		Wild in the Streets music from the film, not to be confused with the original soundtrack
1972	"Little Big Horn" b/w "Dawn Of The 7th Cavalry"		Non-album tracks
1976	"White Man Beware" b/w "Where Do We Go From Here"; Davie Allan solo		Non-album tracks
