= Shindig! (magazine) =

British music magazine

Shindig! is a popular music magazine that is published monthly in the United Kingdom. It has been published by Silverback Publishing since 2015. Before that it was published by Volcano Publishing from 2007.

== History ==
Shindig! was founded by Jon 'Mojo' Mills in 1992 and was initially published under the name Gravedigger as a photocopied fanzine that covered garage-punk music. The name Shindig! was adopted in 1994 to better reflect the broader content of the magazine and pay homage to the American Broadcasting Corporation show of the same name, which brought the British Invasion to the USA. In 1997 Mills was joined by Andy Morten after Morten saw a review of a band he was in, Bronco Bullfrog, published in the magazine. Up until 2002 it was published only once a year.

In 2007 a deal with the small Cambridge-based Volcano Publishing launched the by now full colour magazine as a high street title for the first time and secured international distribution. In 2015, following an acrimonious split from Volcano, the magazine was taken over by Silverback Publishing, adding Shindig! to a roster that included a variety of lifestyle titles such as Kitcar, RetroFord and the trade magazines SGB Golf and SGB Outdoor. In 2017 Shindig! went from appearing eight times a year to appearing monthly.

Shindig! was set up to explore music and pop culture from the late 1960s, covering obscure cult and collectable acts as well as mainstream artists such as the Who, the Byrds and the Kinks. It also covers new acts related to its genres of interest. Noted contributors include writers Kris Needs, John Harris, Simon Matthews and Duncan Barrett and the comedian Stewart Lee. Radio 2's Stuart Maconie, Rough Trade Records' Geoff Travis and David Fricke, the veteran US rock writer and senior editor of Rolling Stone, are high-profile fans of the magazine.
