= Greg Sowders =

American drummer and music publisher (born 1960)

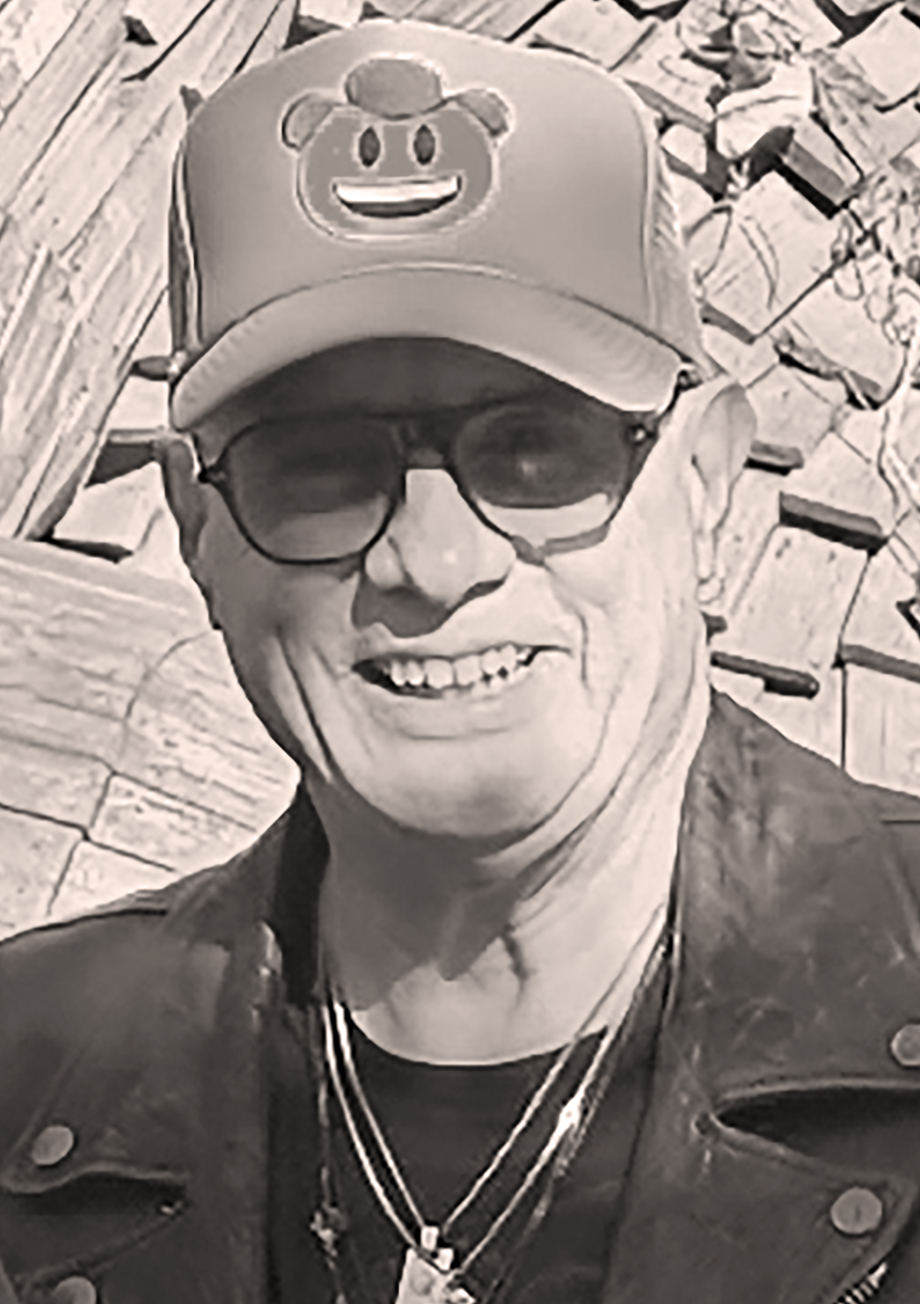
- Greg Sowders in 2023.

Background information
- Birth name: Gregory Michael Sowders
- Born: 17 March 1960 (age 65); La Jolla, California, United States
- Genres: Paisley Underground; alternative country; Americana
- Occupations: Drummer; music publisher
- Instrument: Drums
- Years active: 1980–present
- Labels: Zone-H; M.A.O.; PVC; Frontier; Island; Prima; Cherry Red; Omnivore Recordings

Gregory Michael Sowders (born March 17, 1960) is an American drummer and music publisher. He is a founding member of alternative country and Paisley Underground band the Long Ryders, and Senior Vice President and Head of A&R at Warner Chappell Music in the United States.

== Early life ==
Sowders grew up in Los Angeles and studied history at UCLA. As a child, his parents took him to his first concert with Bo Diddley, Chuck Berry and the Everly Brothers. "When I heard that beat, I knew I wanted to play the drums," Sowders said in 2017. While he was still in elementary school, his older brother went to college and left Sowders his Rolling Stones, Beatles, Beach Boys, and Chuck Berry collections. "And I started listening to this stuff. As I got older - in the late 1960s, early 1970s - I started listening to all that British rock and roll music." In the late 1970s, he became interested in punk rock, and would cite the Ramones, Patti Smith, the Stooges, the Dictators, the Blasters, and X as his favorite artists at the time.

== Musical career ==
In 1979, Sowders co-founded the Box Boys, one of the first Los Angeles-based ska bands that helped launch the ska and mod revival in Los Angeles in 1979 and 1980. They released two singles in 1980 before they disbanded.

Sowders joined the nascent Long Ryders in 1982, recording three albums and an EP with the band before their breakup in 1987. The band reached the charts in the UK and gained a sizable cult following in the US while being popular on college radio. The band's take on American musical traditions was especially a success with critics in the UK, with Melody Maker calling their full-length debut, 1984's Native Sons, "a modern American classic". Extensive touring in the US and Europe helped make them one of the most successful independent bands at the time. After two independent label releases, the Long Ryders signed a major label deal with Island Records, who released the albums State of Our Union (1985) and Two-Fisted Tales (1987). State of Our Union became the band's best selling album and included their UK chart single and signature song "Looking for Lewis and Clark". The Long Ryders would later be regarded as a major influence on the alt-country movement that emerged in the 1990s.

After the dissolution of the Long Ryders, Sowders and fellow Long Ryder Sid Griffin formed the Coal Porters in Los Angeles in 1989. The band continued in the same musical vein as the Long Ryders and later relocated to England without Sowders, who had retired from performing. Sowders did, however, occasionally do live performances and studio sessions with the Coal Porters, guesting on their albums Rebels Without Applause (1991), Land of Hope and Crosby (1994) and Los London (1995). Sowders also guested on former Black Crowe Marc Ford's 2002 album It's About Time.

The Long Ryders have since 2004 occasionally reunited for brief reunions and, in 2019, released their first album in over 30 years, Psychedelic Country Soul. It reached No. 2 on the Official Americana Albums Chart in the UK and topped Amazon UK's Alternative Country and Americana Best Sellers chart.

== Music publishing ==
Sowders worked in the Film and Television department at the performing rights organization BMI for two years before he joined Warner Chappell Music in 1991 as Manager of Film and Television. In 1994, he became Director of A&R. He managed the rock, alternative and urban music divisions, working with artists like the Black Crowes, Lucinda Williams, Wilco, Nickelback, Staind, Rufus Wainwright, and Smash Mouth. He was promoted to the position of Senior Vice-President of A&R in 2004 and, in 2008, also Head of A&R in the United States. His responsibilities includes overseeing all of Warner Chappell's A&R departments in Los Angeles and New York, excluding the Urban department.

In connection with Sowders' promotion to Head of A&R, former CEO for Warner Chappell Music Scott Francis stated, "He is a true music publisher, and has been instrumental in identifying and developing our roster of songwriters." Francis added, "He is a highly personable A&R executive who understands both the creative process and business side. Greg is driven by a passion for music and a devotion to Warner Chappell's songwriters."

By 2018, Sowders' career signings included Katy Perry, Green Day, the Deftones, Slash, David Byrne, and Rob Zombie, and the same year he extended his employment at Warner Chappell.

== Personal life ==
Sowders married singer Lucinda Williams in 1986, but the couple divorced within a year and a half. He has since remarried.

Sowders said in 2019: "If I had nothing at all to do with music, man, I’d do something with motorcycles. I’ve ridden motorcycles my whole life. I’d probably work in a motorcycle shop or something. I never had to have a Plan B, and I certainly didn’t prepare for one."

== Discography ==
=== The Box Boys ===
- "Uptown Yankee Ska" (1980, Zone-H)
- "Skaletons from the Closet" (1980, M.A.O.)

=== The Long Ryders ===
- 10-5-60 (1983, PVC)
- Native Sons (1984, Frontier)
- State of Our Union (1985, Island)
- Two-Fisted Tales (1987, Island)
- BBC Radio One Live in Concert (1994, Windsong)
- Three Minute Warnings: the Long Ryders Live in New York City (2003, Prima)
- State of Our Reunion (2004, Prima)
- Psychedelic Country Soul (2019, Cherry Red / Omnivore)
- September November (2023, Cherry Red)
