= Philip Lloyd-Smee =

English music journalist, designer and record collector

- Other names: Phil Smee
- Occupations: Designer, music journalist
- Known for: Designing iconic album covers, Bam-Caruso records

One of Phil Smee's better known designs

Philip Lloyd-Smee is an English music journalist, designer and record collector, who designed music album covers and owned an independent record label known as Bam-Caruso. In 1986, he began the Rubble music compilation series, wherein he retroactively coined the microgenre and phrase known as "freakbeat" in the liner notes, specifically to refer to a style of British rock music from the 1960s.

Much of Smee's design work was done for CD re-issues of 1960s and 1970s productions by artists such as Moby Grape, Syd Barrett, Elvis Costello, T-Bone Burnett and others. One of his more notable designs is the lettering of the Motörhead logo (the "War-Pig" image is by Joe Petagno).
