= Bill Inglot =

American music engineer and producer

Bill Inglot is an American music engineer and producer, best known for remastering older recordings to high quality digital standards.

Inglot worked for Rhino Entertainment from the 1980s to 2007. He was largely responsible for reintroducing historically popular pop music to modern audiences. Recordings he remastered include those of Ray Charles, The Bee Gees, Ramones, Aretha Franklin, The Four Seasons, Otis Redding, The Monkees, A-ha and Booker T. & the MGs. Inglot helped Rhino locate Monkees tapes from various sources and catalog the group's recordings.
