= At Yankee Stadium =

Studio album by NRBQ
- Released: 1978
- Recorded: November 1977
- Studio: Bearsville (Woodstock, New York)
- Genre: Rock
- Length: 35:30
- Label: Mercury

NRBQ chronology
All Hopped Up (1977)	At Yankee Stadium (1978)	Kick Me Hard (1979)

At Yankee Stadium is a studio album by the American band NRBQ, released in 1978 by Mercury Records. Similar to other NRBQ albums, its title is a joke. The album credits read "Recorded at Bearsville Studios, November 1977 (not at Yankee Stadium)". The packaging includes photographs of the band members in an otherwise empty Yankee Stadium; these were taken as a birthday treat for bassist and founding member Joey Spampinato, when his bandmates arranged a private visit to the ballpark. Spampinato, a Bronx native, is a lifelong Yankees fan.

The album was released in two versions. Early copies included the song "Ridin' in My Car", which had been previously released on All Hopped Up, an album NRBQ released on their own record label (Red Rooster Records) the previous year. "Ridin' in My Car" was subsequently omitted from later versions of At Yankee Stadium.

== Critical reception ==
Professional ratings
Review scores
Source	Rating
AllMusic	4.5/5 stars
Robert Christgau	B+
The Rolling Stone Album Guide	3.5/5 stars
Tom Hull – on the Web	B+

The Daily Reporter praised the band's "rocking reverence for the basics and sense of fun." Robert Christgau noted that "drummer Tom Ardolino makes a marginal but telling difference—the performance is urgent, intense, up, so that even given their adolescent romantic preoccupations ... the songs take on a complex life worthy of their chord changes."

== Track listing ==
1. "Green Lights" (Terry Adams, Joseph Spampinato) – 2:54
2. "Just Ain't Fair" (Spampinato) – 3:01
3. "I Love Her, She Loves Me" (Spampinato) – 2:28
4. "Get Rhythm" (Johnny Cash) – 2:58
5. "That's Neat, That's Nice" (Adams) – 3:09
6. "Ain't No Free" (Adams) – 3:24
7. "I Want You Bad" (Adams, Phil Crandon) – 2:32
8. "The Same Old Thing" (Sherlie Matthews) – 2:21
9. "Yes, Yes, Yes" (Adams) – 2:53
10. "It Comes to Me Naturally" (Al Anderson) – 3:00
11. "Talk to Me" (Adams) – 2:41
12. "Shake, Rattle and Roll" (Charles E. Calhoun) – 3:10
13. "Ridin' in My Car" (Al Anderson) - 2:52

== Personnel ==
NRBQ

- Terry Adams – vocals, piano, organ, Hohner Clavinet
- Al Anderson – guitar, vocals
- Joey Spampinato – bass, acoustic guitar, vocals
- Tom Ardolino – drums

The Whole Wheat Horns

- Keith Spring – saxophone
- Donn Adams – trombone
