= Will Birch =

British musician

Will Birch (born 12 September 1948) is an English music journalist, songwriter, record producer and drummer.

== Career ==
Birch was born in Stratford, Essex, England. He played drums in various bands in the Southend area before helping to form The Kursaal Flyers in 1973. Featuring singer Paul Shuttleworth, the Flyers developed a strong live reputation on London's pub rock scene in the mid-1970s, and released several albums. Their biggest commercial success came in 1976 with the uncharacteristic Mike Batt-produced hit single "Little Does She Know", which Birch co-wrote.

After The Kursaal Flyers disbanded in late 1977, Birch formed a power pop group, the Records. They released the minor hit "Starry Eyes" in 1978, again co-written by Birch; toured the United States; and recorded three albums, before splitting up in 1982.

Birch also co-wrote the song "A.1. on the Jukebox" with Dave Edmunds.

Meanwhile, Birch had already moved into production, working with the Liverpool-based band, Yachts, plus Billy Bremner of Rockpile, Desmond Dekker, The Long Ryders, and later Dr. Feelgood.

In the 1990s he moved into music journalism, writing many articles on the British music scene and, in 2000, writing an acclaimed account of the 1970s pub rock scene, No Sleep Till Canvey Island. He published a well-reviewed biography of Ian Dury, Ian Dury: The Definitive Biography in January 2010. His biography of Nick Lowe "Cruel To Be Kind – The Life & Music Of Nick Lowe" was published in August 2019.
