= Retrospective (Red House Painters album) =

Compilation album by Red House Painters
- Released: July 19, 1999
- Recorded: 1989–1995
- Genre: Folk rock, slowcore
- Length: CD1: 77:51; CD2: 66:23; Total: 144:08
- Language: English
- Label: 4AD
- Producer: Mark Kozelek

Red House Painters chronology
Songs for a Blue Guitar (1996)	Retrospective (1999)	Old Ramon (2001)

Professional ratings
Review scores
Source	Rating
AllMusic	4/5 stars
NME	8/10
Pitchfork	7.2/10

Retrospective is a double-disc compilation of Red House Painters' songs from the band's 4AD era. The compilation was released in July 1999. Disc one is a collection of definitive Red House Painters tracks culled from their debut album Down Colorful Hill through 1995's Ocean Beach, as picked by 4AD label owner Ivo Watts-Russell. Disc two, subtitled Demos, Outtakes, Live (1989-1995), is a collection of unreleased demos and live recordings from their 4AD years. The essay inside the booklet was written by Rob O'Connor in April 1999. A working title for this collection was Red Perspective.

== Track listing ==
All tracks are written by Mark Kozelek, except where noted.

CD1: Retrospective
No.	Title	Writer(s)	Album	Length
1.	"Shock Me"	Ace Frehley	Shock Me EP	4:47
2.	"Grace Cathedral Park"		Red House Painters I	3:52
3.	"Katy Song"		Red House Painters I	8:25
4.	"Summer Dress"		Ocean Beach	2:54
5.	"New Jersey" (Electric Version)		Red House Painters II	4:26
6.	"Medicine Bottle"		Down Colorful Hill	9:51
7.	"Michael"		Down Colorful Hill	5:23
8.	"San Geronimo"		Ocean Beach	7:37
9.	"Bubble"		Red House Painters II	5:32
10.	"Mistress" (Piano Version)		Red House Painters I	4:33
11.	"Drop"		Ocean Beach	8:53
12.	"Evil"		Red House Painters II	7:19
13.	"Rollercoaster"		Red House Painters I	4:18

CD2: Demos, Outtakes, Live (1989-1995)
No.	Title	Writer(s)	Length
1.	"Funhouse" (1989 Demo)		6:07
2.	"Waterkill" (1990 Demo)		7:04
3.	"Uncle Joe" (1990 Demo)		5:56
4.	"Helicopter" (1991 Demo)	Kozelek, Jerry Vessel	5:41
5.	"Brown Eyes" (1992 4-Track Demo)		2:01
6.	"Dragonflies" (1992 Outtake)	Kozelek, Robyn Riel-Nail	4:05
7.	"Japanese to English" (Live in Paris, 1993)		4:21
8.	"Shock Me" (Live on KCRW, 1993)	Frehley	4:26
9.	"Over My Head" (1993 4-Track Demo)		3:58
10.	"Brockwell Park" (1993 4-Track Demo)		5:51
11.	"Shadows" (1994 Outtake)		5:41
12.	"Mistress" (Live on KCRW, 1995)		4:28
13.	"Summer Dress" (Live on KCRW, 1995)		2:34
14.	"Instrumental" (1995 Demo)		4:05

== Credits ==
- "Waterkill" (1990 demo) and "Instrumental"(1995 demo) previously unreleased.
- Art direction and design by v23.
- Wire photograph by Chris Bigg; lighthouse photograph by Dominic Davies.
- Liner notes by Rob O'Connor (credited to "Rob O'Condor"; this is a typographical error. Rob O'Connor also penned the liner notes for the vinyl edition of Mark Kozelek's Admiral Fell Promises album in 2010).

== Release history ==
Country	Date	Label	Format	Catalogue #
United Kingdom	July 19, 1999	4AD	2CD	DAD 9013 CD
United States	July 20, 1999	4AD	2CD	DAD 9011 CD
