= Tom Stevens (musician) =

American musician (1956–2021)

- Birth name: Thomas Howard Stevens
- Born: September 17, 1956
- Origin: Elkhart, Indiana, United States
- Died: January 23, 2021 (aged 64)
- Genres: Roots rock; alternative country; Americana; power pop
- Occupations: Musician; singer; songwriter
- Instruments: Bass; guitar; vocals
- Years active: 1975–2021
- Labels: Pulse; Devil in the Woods; Maia; Avebury
- Website: tomstevens.org

Thomas Howard Stevens (September 17, 1956 – January 23, 2021) was an American bassist, guitarist, singer, and songwriter, often associated with the Paisley Underground and alternative country movements as bassist for roots rock band the Long Ryders. He was a member of Magi and Danny & Dusty, and recorded as a solo artist. In his solo work, Stevens incorporated elements of folk rock, country, psychedelia and garage rock into his music, and released what music reviewer Stewart Lee calls "fascinatingly different solo albums." Stevens was based in Los Angeles in the 1980s, but later returned to his native Indiana.

== Early life ==
Stevens was born and raised in Elkhart, Indiana and started playing music at age nine in various garage and hard rock bands in the 1960s and 1970s. Classically trained, he received scholarship offers from several universities to study double bass, but turned them all down, as he wanted to play rock music. "The thought of either playing in a symphony orchestra or teaching music in a high school did not appeal," he said.

== Career ==
=== Magi ===
In 1975, after graduating from high school, Stevens joined Indiana hard rock band Magi, who released their sole album Win or Lose in 1976. It was recorded in August 1976 at Uncle Dirty's Sound Machine Studios in Kalamazoo, Michigan and co-produced by the band and Bryce "Uncle Dirty" Roberson, a former session guitarist with Chess Records. The self-financed album was released with no major distribution in a limited edition of 1,000 copies, and the band toured Indiana, Michigan and Illinois in the late 1970s. "We were very, very popular in those areas, drawing big crowds everywhere we played. To this day more people in Northern Indiana know Magi than the Long Ryders," Stevens said in 2004. Trying to attract music industry interest, the band relocated to Los Angeles in 1979. However, with their style of hard rock being out of fashion in Los Angeles at the time, the band unsuccessfully tried to adapt to a scene dominated by punk and new wave. Lack of success led to the band slowly falling apart in 1980. Magi reunited for a one-off show in August 1994 at the Elkhart County Fairgrounds and again in March 2011 in Nappanee, Indiana for a benefit concert.

=== Early solo work ===
As Magi was dissolving, Stevens began looking for bands and session work in Los Angeles. He found several bands, but "none that I felt were worth my time," he said. The only session work he found was for "some disco singer that was doing an update on "Sealed with a Kiss." During this period, in between working shifts at the Tower Records music store on the Sunset Strip, Stevens seriously began writing songs and played his first solo acoustic gig in December 1980 at the Troubadour in Hollywood. In November 1981, Stevens recorded a demo with Sunny Paul, then a co-worker at Tower Records and a former touring guitarist for R&B singer Geno Washington. The four-track recordings were recorded and mixed by Paul, who also played drums on the tracks. The demo led to a deal with Los Angeles independent record label Pulse Records. Stevens then enlisted the help of drummer Mark Cuff of the Textones and bassist Johnny Bethesda of Rubber City Rebels and, with Stevens on guitar and vocals, they recorded six songs at Perspective Studios in Los Angeles on September 29, 1982.

The result was the Points of View EP, which was engineered by Thom Wilson and with production credited to Stevens. The instrumentation was deliberately spare, with only one guitar, bass, drums and vocals. In a retrospective review in 1998, Q magazine called the EP "serviceable melodic power pop" with "insipid production" that makes the songs "jangle along too politely." While Stevens later said that the EP was a good start of trying to make a different style for himself, he felt that the production was weak: "I’m credited, but I really had no control ... and the mastering was terrible. Still, there was and is a demand for that record," he said in 2004. "The label owners were very keen on having Rodney Bingenheimer give it a good push on his KROQ radio show, but Rodney said it was a folk album and declined to play it – Rodney was playing hardcore punk at the time. I think the label thought this would be a big cash cow for them, and it wasn't, although it did sell steadily," Stevens said. Points of View received decent reviews at the time of its release and sold its 1,000 pressing in a couple of years.

=== The Long Ryders ===
By 1983, Stevens had left his day job at Tower Records for another job at Sounds Good Imports in Santa Monica. He recounted in 2004 that one of his co-workers "brought a pre-release cassette of his old roommate's band, which was 10-5-60 by the Long Ryders, and played it a lot while we were working. I was impressed with that EP and wound up buying it." A few months later, around Christmas time, that same co-worker revealed to Stevens that the Long Ryders had just fired their bass player. "Without missing a beat, I said, "hell, I'll play bass for them," Stevens remembered. Soon after, mutual friends phoned up Long Ryder guitarist Sid Griffin, recommending Stevens for the job. "I didn't even have to formally audition. The Long Ryders had gigs coming up in the San Francisco area and needed someone quickly," he said.

Stevens officially joined the Los Angeles-based Long Ryders in January 1984, recording three studio albums with the band between 1984 and 1987, all featuring Stevens-penned songs. The Long Ryders were originally associated with the Los Angeles Paisley Underground movement of the 1980s, but unlike other bands of the genre, psychedelic rock played only a small role in their music. Instead, the band were more influenced by the roots rock approach of folk and country rock bands like the Byrds, the Flying Burrito Brothers, and Buffalo Springfield. According to the Rolling Stone Encyclopedia of Rock & Roll, the Long Ryders "blended punk attitude with late 1960s country rock instrumentation and became one of the principal exponents of mid-1980s cowpunk." They toured North America and Europe several times as well as reaching the charts in the UK and earning a large cult following in the US while doing well on college radio. The band broke up in 1987 after failing to break through into the mainstream and would later turn out to be an influence on the alternative country movement that would surface in the 1990s.

Their 1984 debut album Native Sons received strong reviews, and did especially well in the UK, where the band's take on American musical traditions went down well with critics. The album was called "a modern American classic" by British music magazine the Melody Maker and established the band's diverse blend of folk rock, punk and country rock influences. Island Records signed the band in 1985 for their first major label album, 1985's State of Our Union, and the band soon found themselves more popular in Europe than in the US. In 1987, following the release of their third album Two-Fisted Tales, the lack of commercial success and label support began to take its toll on the band. Disillusioned by the band's relentless touring schedule and lack of money, Stevens left the Long Ryders in June 1987 to devote time to his young family and to find another source of income. In 1988, he moved back to Indiana.

The Long Ryders, including Stevens, have since 2004 occasionally reunited and released their first studio album in 32 years, Psychedelic Country Soul, in 2019. On January 21, 2022, the Long Ryders released a tribute single to their bandmate titled "Tom Tom."

=== Danny and Dusty ===
Along with other members of the Long Ryders, the Dream Syndicate and Green on Red, Stevens recorded the Danny & Dusty album, The Lost Weekend in 1985. It featured songs written by Dan Stuart (Danny) from Green on Red and Steve Wynn (Dusty) from the Dream Syndicate and was recorded in a single 32 hours recording session in February 1985 at Control Center Studios in Los Angeles. Backing up Stuart and Wynn, besides Stevens on bass, were guitarists Sid Griffin and Stephen McCarthy from the Long Ryders, keyboardist Chris Cacavas from Green on Red, and drummer Dennis Duck from the Dream Syndicate. The Lost Weekend appeared on many year-end top 10 lists, including the New York Times'. After the album's release, the seven-piece band played only a few shows in Los Angeles. In 2007, Danny & Dusty released a second album, Cast Iron Soul, without Stevens' involvement.

=== Collaborations, live and session work ===
Stevens supported former Byrd Gene Clark on a few of Clark's last live Los Angeles performances with former Textones vocalist Carla Olson. In March 1987, between Long Ryders tours, Stevens was asked to play standup bass for a Clark and Olson gig at my Place in Santa Monica. Together with Dwight Yoakam, pianist Skip Edwards and drummer Michael Huey they performed material from Clark and Olson's then-current album So Rebellious a Lover. A year later, Stevens was asked once again to perform with Clark and Olson at Club Lingerie in Hollywood. Performing with Clark "was an honor I cherish to this day," Stevens said in 1996.

In the late 1980s, Stevens played with Chris Cacavas in his band Junk Yard Love and contributed bass and backing vocals on two tracks on their 1989 album Chris Cacavas and Junk Yard Love. He also produced Green on Red bassist Jack Waterson's 1989 solo album Whose Dog?, as well as playing bass, lead guitar and singing backing vocals. Since 2014, Stevens has recorded with psychedelic garage band Donovan's Brain, a recording collective with a revolving lineup that includes founder Ron Sanchez, Ric Parnell (Atomic Rooster, Spinal Tap) and Bobby Sutliff (the Windbreakers).

=== Later solo work ===
Stevens' first full-length solo release, the cassette-only Last Night, was released by California indie label Devil in the Woods in 1992 . It featured new songs as well as rerecordings of unused Long Ryders material such as "17 Ways", "The Upper Hand" and "Sad Sad Songs". Two tracks were produced by Jack Waterson and recorded at Larry's Pro Sound in California in 1988 with Chris Cacavas on bass and organ and Jim McGrath on drums. The rest of the recordings were produced by Stevens and recorded at Allen Recording Studio in Indiana in 1989. Musicians included studio owner Scott Allen on drums, violinist Gretchen Priest and former Magi-guitarist Larry Stutzman. Stevens handled bass and most of the guitar duties. "[Scott Allen], as his time allowed, let me use his studio to slowly finish it. By slowly, I mean excruciatingly so," Stevens said in 1996. "Nearly two years passed before Last Night could be completed, and then cassettes with rough mixes that were screwed up but powerful sounding were the result. I also had a few polite, clean mixes but they were not nearly as involving."

His second album, Another Room, was produced by Waterson at the Root Canal in Hollywood in early 1993. The album was originally slated to be released on German label Doggybag Records and distributed by Sony Germany, but complications delayed its release for two years when Doggybag went bankrupt. It was eventually released in October 1995 on Ohio-based Maia Records. The only two musicians featured on the album are Stevens (vocals, guitar, bass) and Jet Redd (drums). "Howard Hilliard II" is credited with bass duty, but is actually a pseudonym for Stevens. Waterson, Melisa Malvin and John Thoman of the Rain Parade supply backing vocals on three tracks. The album was well received by fans and critics alike. Bucketfull of Brains magazine called it "a splendid piece of Americana" and "a typical example of the hidden gems on the bi-ways of American music." Relix magazine described it as an "unpretentious rootsy pop-rock adventure" with an "abundance of hook-filled songs that [Stevens] laces liberally with folk, country and rock influences".

1997 saw the release of Points Revisited (Maia Records), a collection of Stevens' solo recordings from 1981 to 1989. "After my solo CD Another Room came out, people were writing to the label asking for a Points of View reissue. I instead put out Points Revisited, which contained some Points of View tracks, but substituted demos for some other PoV tracks that I thought told the story better," Stevens said. The compilation contains three tracks from the original EP, three alternate demo versions, the entire Last Night album (with one track in an alternate version), and two home demos. It received four-star reviews from AllMusic and Q magazine, and Goldmine called it "unfailingly melodic and memorable" and rivaling "anything that the Long Ryders ever laid down".

In 1999, Stevens contributed his version of "Everybody Knows This Is Nowhere" to the Neil Young tribute album This Note's for You Too! A Tribute to Neil Young. All proceeds from sales went directly to benefit Neil and Pegi Young's Bridge School foundation, and the album included artists such as the Bevis Frond, Lee Ranaldo, the Coal Porters, Richard Lloyd, Steve Wynn, and the Walkabouts. Stevens had recorded the song, along with several originals, in March 1997 at Doug Harsch's Raw Pop Studios in Indiana with Steve Gee on drums and Harsch on backing vocals.

Stevens' proper third album, Home, was recorded in his new home basement studio in Indiana and released in 2007 by Avebury Records, a label founded by Wednesday Week drummer Kelly Callan. The self-produced and mostly self-recorded album features guest appearances by Sarah Stevens on violin and vocals, and "Uncle John" Potthast on banjo and guitar on a few tracks. The album was inspired by his family's move to a new house in 2003, where he set up his studio to record musical ideas. "Having a full recording setup inspired me to complete many songs I had in various stages of assembly, and also write new ones as I settled in with my new environment," Stevens said. Most of the songs were written or completed between 2003 and 2005, with a few taken from earlier songwriting periods. Bucketfull of Brains described the music as a "paisley potpourri" of "LA folk-pop, psychedelia, and a little bit of country" and called the album "a stone classic." In a four-star review on AllMusic, music critic Jack Rabid felt that there wasn't "one under-considered, underplayed, or under-written second" on the album. On their Best Albums of 2007 list, the Popnarcotic website called it an "absolutely breathtaking album", noting that Stevens "seems to be able to find his muse where Gram Parsons, Lou Reed, and Alex Chilton all hang out to shoot the breeze."

Stevens also self-released two six-song EPs, Workology and Sooner. 2001's Workology was recorded at the same March 1997 sessions as "Everybody Knows This Is Nowhere" and contains early versions of songs that would later end up on Home and Sooner. Released in November 2009 through iTunes, Sooner contains new and old songs that Stevens has written and recorded over the years but never released before, as well as a rerecording of the Long Ryders era song "How Do We Feel What’s Real?" and a cover of the Only Ones' "Curtains for You". Both EPs were also available as limited CD-Rs through Stevens’ website.

To celebrate its 35th anniversary in 2010, German record label Bear Family Records asked musicians and songwriters to write and record "bear" songs for the compilation album 35!!! Years – Bear Family Records. They asked Stevens to contribute a song and he wrote "Bear in the Woods" for the occasion. In 2017, the Long Ryders recorded their own version of the song as their first new studio recording in 30 years and released it as a digital download single.

In September 2012, Stevens recorded the song "Bitter Fruit" for the 2013 benefit album Skrang: Sounds Like Bobby Sutliff. Sutliff, a former Devil in the Woods labelmate, had been in a near-fatal car accident and to help him financially, friends and colleagues offered to record tracks. The album contains 18 Sutliff songs performed by members of Rain Parade, True West, the dBs, and Wilco among others.

== Other career ==
In the 1990s, Stevens received a degree in computer science and worked for many years with computer and networking technologies alongside music.

== Death ==
On January 23, 2021, Tom Stevens died suddenly at his home in Indiana of undisclosed causes. He was 64 years old. In a statement accompanying the tribute single "Tom Tom," the remaining Long Ryders called him "a terrific person, a devoted husband and father, and the best bass player of his generation in Los Angeles." Sid Griffin, in a tribute in Shindig! magazine, wrote that Stevens "was clearly one of the very most popular members of the entire Paisley Underground. Everyone liked Tom. ... He was even-tempered, had time for every thing and everybody, and was always good company. ... We also had a fine lead singer in Tom Stevens, a crackin' harmony singer, and a songwriter who penned killer material."

== Discography ==
=== Magi ===
- Win or Lose (1976, Not on label)

=== The Long Ryders ===
- Native Sons (1984, Frontier)
- State of Our Union (1985, Island)
- Two-Fisted Tales (1987, Island)
- Metallic B.O. (1989, R.O.W.Y.C.O.)
- BBC Radio One Live in Concert (1994, Windsong)
- Looking for Lewis and Clark: the Long Ryders Anthology (1998, Chronicles)
- Three Minute Warnings: the Long Ryders Live in New York City (2003, Prima)
- The Best of the Long Ryders (2004, Prima)
- State of Our Reunion (2007, Prima)
- Final Wild Songs (2016, Cherry Red)
- Psychedelic Country Soul (2019, Cherry Red / Omnivore)

=== Danny and Dusty ===
- The Lost Weekend (1985, A&M)

=== Solo ===
- Points of View EP (1982, Pulse)
- Last Night (1992, Devil in the Woods)
- Another Room (1995, Maia)
- Points Revisited (1997, Maia)
- Workology EP (2001, Not on label)
- Home (2007, Avebury)
- Sooner EP (2009, Not on label)

=== Other solo appearances ===
- This Note's for You Too! A Tribute to Neil Young (1999, Inbetweens) – "Everybody Knows This Is Nowhere"
- 35!!! Years – Bear Family Records (2010, Bear Family) – "Bear in the Woods"
- Skrang: Sounds Like Bobby Sutliff (2013, The Paisley Pop Label / Career / Cool Dog Sound) – "Bitter Fruit"

=== Guest appearances ===
- Jack Waterson: Whose Dog? (1988, Heyday) – producer, guitar, bass, vocals
- Chris Cacavas and Junk Yard Love: Chris Cacavas and Junk Yard Love (1989, Heyday / World Service) – bass, backing vocals on two tracks
- Donovan's Brain: Shambaholic and Other Love Songs (2014, Career) – bass, backing vocals on six tracks
- Donovan's Brain: Heirloom Varieties (2015, Career) – bass on all tracks; guitar, vocals on three tracks
- Donovan's Brain: Convolutions of the Brain (2018, Career) – engineer; bass on three tracks
- Donovan's Brain and Fraudband: Burnt Trees in the Snow (2019, Kasumuen / Career) – bass on two tracks
