= This Time Around (Green on Red album) =

Studio album by Green on Red
- Released: 1989
- Genre: Rock
- Label: China
- Producer: Glyn Johns

Green on Red chronology
Here Come the Snakes (1989)	This Time Around (1989)	Live at the Town and Country Club (1989)

This Time Around is an album by the American band Green on Red, released in 1989. It was first released in the United Kingdom. The band supported the album with a European tour. This Time Around was a commercial disappointment.

== Production ==
Recorded in ten days, the album was produced by Glyn Johns. It was recorded by band members Dan Stuart and Chuck Prophet, backed by studio and guest musicians. Spooner Oldham played organ on the album; Bernie Leadon contributed on guitar. "You Couldn't Get Arrested" is about the travails of a drug addict.

== Critical reception ==
Professional ratings
Review scores
Source	Rating
AllMusic	2.5/5 stars
The Encyclopedia of Popular Music	3/5 stars
Los Angeles Times	3/5 stars
MusicHound Rock: The Essential Album Guide	2.5/5 stars
The State	4/5 stars
Vancouver Sun	4/5 stars

The Vancouver Sun stated that "Dan Stuart has taken it upon himself to be the chronicler of the Great American Nightmare—the white trash world of the underclass." Trouser Press wrote that Green on Red "keep messing around in old Stones turf, but the resonant Memphis mood that made sense of the previous LP is in short supply here." The Los Angeles Times deemed This Time Around the band's "leanest, meanest album yet." The Austin American-Statesman opined that "the sound is reminiscent of classic-era Rolling Stones."

AllMusic wrote that, "by this time Stuart's drunken-loser schtick has worn thin."

== Track listing ==
No.	Title	Length
1.	"This Time Around"
2.	"Cool Million"
3.	"Rev. Luther"
4.	"Good Patient Woman"
5.	"You Couldn't Get Arrested"
6.	"The Quarter"
7.	"Foot"
8.	"Hold the Line"
9.	"Pills and Booze"
10.	"We're All Waiting"
