= September November =

Studio album by the Long Ryders
- Released: March 10, 2023
- Recorded: July 2022
- Studio: Kozy Tone Ranch (Poway, California)
- Genres: Country rock; folk rock; alternative country; roots rock; Americana
- Length: 42:53
- Label: Cherry Red
- Producer: Ed Stasium

The Long Ryders chronology
Psychedelic Country Soul (2019)	September November (2023)

Singles from September November
- 1. "Tom Tom" Released: January 21, 2022; 2. "September November Sometime" Released: January 27, 2023; 3. "Elmer Gantry Is Alive and Well" Released: February 10, 2023; 4. "Seasons Change" Released: February 24, 2023

September November is the fifth studio album by American band the Long Ryders, released on March 10, 2023, by Cherry Red Records. It is their first full-length album without bassist Tom Stevens, who died in 2021. The album is produced by Ed Stasium, who also produced the Long Ryders' two previous albums, Two-Fisted Tales (1987) and Psychedelic Country Soul (2019).

== Background ==
Due to the passing of long-time bassist Tom Stevens, bass duties on the album were shared by the Long Ryders' Stephen McCarthy and Murry Hammond of Old 97's. Guests on the album include D. J. Bonebrake of punk band X on vibraphone and violinist Kerenza Peacock of the Coal Porters. The album was recorded in July 2022 at producer Ed Stasium's Kozy Tone Ranch studio in California.

The album includes two Tom Stevens tributes: "Tom Tom", which was released as a download single on January 21, 2022, and the Stevens-penned "Flying Out of London in the Rain". Due to the COVID-19 pandemic, the Long Ryders recorded "Tom Tom" by emailing sound files back and forth. The song went from drummer Greg Sowders in Los Angeles to guitarist Stephen McCarthy in Virginia, to Ed Stasium near San Diego and then to guitarist Sid Griffin in London. The initial lyrics had come to Sowders in a dream and were finished with contributions by Griffin and McCarthy.

"Flying Out of London in the Rain" had originally been recorded for Tom Stevens' 2007 solo album Home. The band kept Stevens' original lead vocals, guitar and bass, and added new instrumental parts. The backing vocals of daughter Sarah Stevens were also kept from the original recording.

The album title refers to the band being in the fall of their lives.

== Reception ==
Professional ratings
Review scores
Source	Rating
AllMusic	3.5/5 stars
Classic Rock	7/10
God Is in the TV	8/10
Record Collector	4/5 stars
Shindig!	4/5 stars
Spiral Earth	4/5 stars
Uncut	8/10

September November received positive reviews from music critics. Classic Rock wrote, "As evidenced by 2019's Psychedelic Country Soul – their first album in more than 30 years – the Long Ryders not only defined their oeuvre, but actually picked up where they left off. And now, proving that it was no fluke, September November refines their sound further."

Record Collector felt that "the result is, at times, gentler, more reflective ... But there's also the freewheeling sound the band have always been known for ... while their understated psychedelia surfaces on the hypnotic, guitar-rocking "Elmer Gantry Is Alive and Well." Add a dusting of country soul and it's a cool collection." Spiral Earth called it "a smorgasbord of sounds, from tub thumping rockers to western swing ditties and all points in between."

AllMusic felt that though there are some "solidly upbeat" songs on the album, "the more contemplative tone [of other songs] is what comes off most clearly." The band "deliver performances that come straight from the heart, and producer Ed Stasium gives the sessions a sound that's rich and naturalistic."

Punktuation! Magazine wrote, "What September November has in common with every Long Ryders release is its want for repeated listens ... It deserves its place under the band's umbrella alongside the giants: Native Sons, State of Our Union, Two-Fisted Tales and Psychedelic Country Soul." Uncut opined that the album "is undeniably a vital, relevant, 21st-century artefact."

== Track listing ==
No.	Title	Writer(s)	Length
1.	"September November Sometime"	Sid Griffin, Stephen McCarthy	3:26
2.	"Seasons Change"	McCarthy	3:29
3.	"Flying Down"	Griffin, McCarthy, Greg Sowders	4:32
4.	"Elmer Gantry Is Alive and Well"	Griffin, McCarthy	5:10
5.	"Hand of Fate"	McCarthy	3:10
6.	"Song for Ukraine" (instrumental)	Griffin	1:55
7.	"To the Manor Born"	McCarthy	3:28
8.	"That's What They Say About Love"	Griffin	2:37
9.	"Country Blues (Kitchen)"	McCarthy	3:32
10.	"Tom Tom"	Griffin, McCarthy, Sowders, Ed Stasium	4:21
11.	"Until God Takes Me Away"	Griffin	2:29
12.	"Flying Out of London in the Rain"	Tom Stevens	4:47

== Personnel ==
Adapted from the album liner notes.

The Long Ryders

- Sid Griffin – vocals, guitar, mandolin, mandocello, harmonica, banjo
- Stephen McCarthy – vocals, guitar, upright bass, octave mandolin, lap steel, keyboards (4, 5), bouzouki (5)
- Greg Sowders – drums, percussion

Additional musicians

- Tom Stevens – lead vocals, guitar, bass (12)
- Sarah Stevens – backing vocals (12)
- Ed Stasium – keyboards, backing vocals
- Murry Hammond – bass (2–4)
- Kerenza Peacock – violin (1, 6, 8)
- Charles Arthur – piano (9)
- D. J. Bonebrake – vibes (3, 6)
- Ben Moore – organ (2, 7)

Technical

- Ed Stasium – production, engineering, mixing, photography
- Steve Fallone – mastering
- Phil Smee – design, artwork

== Charts ==
Chart performance for September November
Chart (2023)	Peak position
Scottish Albums (Official Charts)	49
UK Album Sales	52
UK Physical Albums	50
UK Country Albums (Official Charts)	3
UK Independent Albums (Official Charts)	19
UK Independent Album Breakers (OCC)	7
