= Psychedelic Country Soul =

Studio album by the Long Ryders
- Released: February 15, 2019
- Recorded: November 2017–January 2018
- Studios: Record One (Los Angeles); Eight Palms Ranchero (Poway, California); Montrose Recording (Richmond, Virginia)
- Genres: Roots rock; folk rock; country rock; Americana
- Length: 49:50
- Label: Omnivore / Cherry Red
- Producer: Ed Stasium

The Long Ryders chronology
Two-Fisted Tales (1987)	Psychedelic Country Soul (2019)	September November (2023)

Singles from Psychedelic Country Soul
- 1. "Greenville" Released: January 8, 2019; 2. "Molly Somebody" Released: March 29, 2019; 3. "Walls (radio edit)" Released: September 13, 2019

Psychedelic Country Soul is the fourth studio album by American band the Long Ryders, released on February 15, 2019, through Omnivore Recordings in the US and Cherry Red Records in the UK. It is the band's first album in 32 years with Two-Fisted Tales their last release in 1987.

The first single from the album, "Greenville" was released on January 8, 2019. Two further singles, "Molly Somebody" and "Walls", were released in March and September 2019, respectively.

== Background ==
The Long Ryders originally disbanded in 1987 but have periodically regrouped for brief reunions. The only new material released by the band since 1987 was the 2017 single, "Bear in the Woods". In 2017, the Long Ryders were offered a week's free studio time by Larry Chatman at Dr. Dre's Los Angeles recording studio, Record One. Chatman, who in the 1980s was part of the Long Ryders' road crew, had since become Dr. Dre's personal assistant, helping to oversee the studio. The band had hired Chatman as a roadie for several tours in the 1980s and made him the bass player when Long Ryder bassist Tom Stevens left the band before their final tour in 1987. Guitarist Sid Griffin: "For the last thirty years he has been telling me that he had never forgotten how kind the Long Ryders were to him when he was down and out in L.A. ... Larry kept saying, "I am going to pay you back."

Griffin and the band accepted Chatman's generous offer and secured the services of their last producer, Ed Stasium (the Ramones, the Smithereens, Living Colour, Jeff Healey Band). The band traded demos, agreed on the material and learned the songs at home before rehearsals in Los Angeles. A week of recording was then booked at Record One in November 2017. "We actually had to beg Larry for an extra day because we were not quite done," Griffin said. Additional overdubs were done at Stasium's Eight Palms Ranchero home studio in Poway, California in December and at Montrose Recording in Richmond, Virginia in January 2018. The finished recordings were then mixed by Stasium at his studio. Before the recordings got underway, Griffin was adamant that the band should not release a bad album, "If we had just three or four good songs, then we could put them out on an EP or on Spotify," he said. Griffin's concerns, however, were put to rest when the recordings were done. "I was just stunned how well things turned out," he said

Psychedelic Country Soul features eleven new Long Ryders compositions, all written specifically for the album, and a cover of Tom Petty's "Walls". "Every time I met him he was a great guy, very fond of the band," Griffin said, "so we thought we’d do a little song in his honour." Guests on the album include Debbi and Vicki Peterson of the Bangles on backing vocals, Dave Pearlman (Dan Fogelberg, Phil Everly, Hoyt Axton) on pedal steel guitar and Kerenza Peacock of the Coal Porters on violin.

Griffin has called Psychedelic Country Soul "the album we were always trying to make … each flavor which made the band unique is there be it C&W, rock 'n' roll, troubadour folk music, raw R&B, or out-there psychedelia."

== Reception ==
Professional ratings
Aggregate scores
Source	Rating
Metacritic	79/100
Review scores
Source	Rating
AllMusic	4/5 stars
American Songwriter	4/5 stars
Elmore	91/100
Exclaim!	8/10
Express	4/5 stars
Maverick	4/5 stars
Mojo	4/5 stars
PopMatters	7/10
Shindig!	4/5 stars
Soundblab	9/10
The Spill Magazine	8/10
Uncut	7/10
The Vinyl District	B+

Psychedelic Country Soul received positive reviews from music critics. AllMusic felt that the album is "every bit as satisfying" as their earlier albums Native Sons and Two-Fisted Tales, and "within throwing distance" of their best album, State of Our Union. Country music magazine Maverick called it "a masterful return from one of the great names in country rock," and PopMatters similarly called it a "triumphant return" and felt that the album is "as good as anything the Long Ryders released back when they were helping to invent what we now call Americana."

Exclaim! magazine wrote that the band "appear at the top of their game, with youthful aggression replaced by measured maturity." Louder Than War wrote, "Remarkably, not only does Psychedelic Country Soul stand up to its predecessors, it has a more cohesive sound ... and most of the songs here rank alongside anything in their repertoire." They concluded that "it’s evident that this is more than a return to form; it’s a highlight of their career."

== Track listing ==
No.	Title	Writer(s)	Length
1.	"Greenville"	Stephen McCarthy	4:26
2.	"Let It Fly"	Tom Stevens	3:49
3.	"Molly Somebody"	Sid Griffin, Steve Barton	3:39
4.	"All Aboard"	Griffin, Stevens	3:43
5.	"Gonna Make It Real"	McCarthy	3:26
6.	"If You Want to See Me Cry"	Griffin	3:08
7.	"What the Eagle Sees"	Griffin, Stevens	3:19
8.	"California State Line"	McCarthy	4:31
9.	"The Sound"	Griffin, Greg Sowders, Ed Stasium	3:58
10.	"Walls"	Tom Petty	4:39
11.	"Bells of August"	Stevens	5:04
12.	"Psychedelic Country Soul"	Griffin, McCarthy	6:08

== Personnel ==
Adapted from the album's liner notes.

The Long Ryders

- Sid Griffin – vocals, guitar, mandolin, harmonica
- Stephen McCarthy – vocals, acoustic guitar, electric guitar, pedal steel guitar, Mellotron, bass (4, 11)
- Tom Stevens – vocals, bass, acoustic guitar, electric guitar, lead guitar (4, 7, 11)
- Greg Sowders – drums, percussion

Additional musicians

- Ed Stasium – vocals, organ, synth horns, tambura, melodica
- Debbi Peterson – vocals (2, 10)
- Vicki Peterson – vocals (2, 10)
- Kerenza Peacock – violin (2, 6, 8)
- Dave Pearlman – pedal steel guitar (8)
- Miss Julia Wild – vocals (10)
- Charles Arthur – organ (10)
- Hoppy Nipkins – piano (12)

Technical

- Ed Stasium – producer, engineer, mixing
- Lola Romero – assistant engineer
- Adrian Olsen – overdub engineer
- Alexandra Spalding – assistant overdub engineer
- Greg Calbi – mastering
- Greg Allen – art direction, design
- Henry Diltz – photography

== Charts ==
Chart	Peak position
UK Americana Albums (Official Charts)	2
UK Country Albums (Official Charts)	4
UK Independent Albums (Official Charts)	10
