= Temple Beautiful =

Studio album by Chuck Prophet
- Released: February 7, 2012
- Recorded: Decibelle
- Genre: Rock
- Length: 42:38
- Labels: Yep Roc Records; Burger Records
- Producers: Brad Jones, Chuck Prophet

Chuck Prophet chronology
Let Freedom Ring (2009)	Temple Beautiful (2012)	Night Surfer (2014)

Temple Beautiful is the twelfth full-length album by American singer-songwriter Chuck Prophet. It was released in the U.S. on February 7, 2012, through Yep Roc Records. Burger Records released a limited run of 150 cassette tapes.

Temple Beautiful is named after a long-closed rock and roll club on Geary Street that was between Bill Graham's iconic Fillmore and the storefront church founded by the Reverend Jim Jones. According to Prophet: "These songs off my new record. It’s a very SF-centric record. I’ve been tapping into the history, the weirdness, the energy and spontaneity that brought me here in the first place.” Prophet wrote the entire record with his main songwriting partner, klipschutz (pen name of Kurt Lipschutz). Both are long-time San Franciscans.

In late 2013, Prophet and band performed the 12 song cycle Temple Beautiful with a string octet (scored and conducted by Brad Jones) in San Francisco; a documentary and album (Strings in the Temple: Live with Orchestra at the Great American Music Hall) of this were subsequently released.

Prophet and klipschutz have written a full-length theatrical musical, Temple Beautiful: The Musical, inspired by the album and including characters from the album's songs.

== Cultural references ==
The album references a number of characters and locations from San Francisco's history, including:

- Willie Mays
- The Mitchell Brothers
- Jim Jones
- Laughing Sal
- Red Man
- Dan White
- Castro District
- Emperor Norton
- Mission District
- Harvey Milk
- Carol Doda
- White Night riots

== Critical reception ==
Professional ratings
Aggregate scores
Source	Rating
Metacritic	82/100
Review scores
Source	Rating
AllMusic	4/5 stars
The Austin Chronicle	3.5/5 stars
Classic Rock	3.5/5 stars
Mojo	4/5 stars
musicOMH	4/5 stars
Paste	9/10
PopMatters	7/10
Q	4/5 stars
Uncut	8/10

Exclaim! called the album "the sound of a mature rock'n'roller continuing to reach for new heights." PopMatters called it "a fun, tuneful rock 'n' roll record that's both straight from the gut and as wonderfully curved as the city which inspired it." Poetic Justice praised the album with its wide cast of characters as a San Francisco equivalent of London Calling.

== Track listing ==
All songs written by Chuck Prophet and klipschutz

1. "Play That Song Again"
2. "Castro Halloween"
3. "Temple Beautiful"
4. "Museum of Broken Hearts"
5. "Willie Mays is Up at Bat"
6. "The Left Hand and the Right Hand"
7. "I Felt Like Jesus"
8. "Who Shot John"
9. "He Came From So Far Away (Red Man Speaks)"
10. "Little Girl, Little Boy"
11. "White Night, Big City"
12. "Emperor Norton in the Last Year of His Life (1880)"

== Personnel ==
- Produced by Brad Jones and Chuck Prophet
- Recorded in San Francisco at Decibelle
- Engineered by Brad Jones and Drew Zajicek
- Mixed by Brad Jones at Alex The Great
- Mastered by Richard Dodd
- Chuck Prophet – guitars, vocals
- James DePrato – guitars
- Rusty Miller – bass, vocals
- Prairie Prince – drums, percussion
- with:
- Stephanie Finch – vocals
- Roy Loney – vocal on "Temple Beautiful”
- Chris Carmichael – cello, violin
- Jim Hoke – woodwinds, flute
- Brad Jones – piano

== Musical adaptation ==
Temple Beautiful: The Musical is named after a seminal San Francisco punk club circa 1980. The collaboration between Chuck Prophet and poet/songwriter klipschutz (pen name of Kurt Lipschutz) pits aging punk rockers against Google employees on a city “orientation-come-sensitivity” bus tour gone sideways.

A first workshop, gathering creatives from Brooklyn, New Orleans, and San Francisco, took place in 2016 over five days at the old firehouse on Treasure Island. A second workshop, in 2018, lasted 10 days, culminating with a staged reading/performance under Emilie Whelan’s direction at PianoFight, with five musicians and nine actors.

== Works cited ==
- Collum, Danny (2012). "Temple Beautiful" U.S. Catholic 2012 vol:(77) 4
- Liner Notes from "Temple Beautiful"
