= Long Distance Runaround =

Song by the progressive rock group Yes

Song by Yes

from the album Fragile
- A-side: "Roundabout"
- Released: 12 November 1971 (UK); 4 January 1972 (US)
- Genre: Progressive rock
- Length: 3:30
- Label: Atlantic
- Songwriter: Jon Anderson
- Producers: Yes; Eddy Offord

"Long Distance Runaround" is a song by the progressive rock group Yes first recorded for their 1971 album, Fragile. Written by lead singer Jon Anderson, the song was released as a B-side to "Roundabout", but became a surprise hit in its own right as a staple of album-oriented rock radio. On Fragile it segues into "The Fish (Schindleria Praematurus)".

Yes co-founder Jon Anderson wrote the lyrics to this song while allegedly remembering his encounters with religious hypocrisy and competition he experienced in attending church regularly as a youth in northern England. "Long time / waiting to feel the sound" was a sentiment toward wanting to see a real, compassionate, non-threatening example of godliness.

== Composition and recording ==
The song shifts keys between A minor and B minor and is polymetric in the verses - the drums are playing in 5/8 time against the rest of the group playing in 4/4 time.

== Personnel ==
- Jon Anderson – lead and backing vocals
- Steve Howe – electric guitars
- Chris Squire – bass
- Rick Wakeman – RMI 300B Electra-Piano and Harpsichord, grand piano
- Bill Bruford – drums, percussion

== Cover versions ==
- The Bad Plus (album: For All I Care).
- Red House Painters (albums: Songs for a Blue Guitar and the vinyl version of Ocean Beach).
- The Joggers (album: Bridging The Distance).
