= Bobby Fuller Died for Your Sins =

Studio album by Chuck Prophet
- Released: February 10, 2017
- Genre: Rock
- Label: Yep Roc
- Producer: Brad Jones, Chuck Prophet, Bill Wesemann

Chuck Prophet chronology
Night Surfer (2014)	Bobby Fuller Died for Your Sins (2017)	The Land That Time Forgot (2020)

Bobby Fuller Died for Your Sins is an album by recording artist and singer-songwriter Chuck Prophet. It was released on February 10, 2017, on Yep Roc Records. Chuck Prophet has described the album as "California Noir", elaborating: "the state has always represented the Golden Dream, and it's the tension between romance and reality that lurks underneath the surface in all noir films and paperbacks, and that connects these songs. Doomed love, inconsolable loneliness, rags to riches to rags again, and fast-paced violence are always on the menu on the Left Coast." The title of the album refers to the mystery long surrounding Bobby Fuller, a well regarded musician in the mid-1960s. Fuller was found dead in his car, which was parked outside of his Hollywood apartment, in July 1966. Fuller was 23 years old. His death was ruled a suicide, but the circumstances of his death remain controversial.

== Recording ==
The album was recorded at Hyde St. Studios in San Francisco on a tape machine with contributors Brad Jones, Paul Q. Kolderie, and Matt Winegar. The Mission Express, Prophet's band, which includes his wife Stephanie Finch, backed Prophet.

Notable tracks include “Bad Year for Rock and Roll", an homage to the many influential rock musicians who died in 2016, including David Bowie and Prince.

== Reception ==
Professional ratings
Review scores
Source	Rating
AllMusic	4/5 stars

Bobby Fuller Died for Your Sins was received favorably by critics. NPR ran a "First Listen" for the album the week prior to its release, where users could stream the album in full. The write-up praised it as follows: “Prophet's new album feels like riding shotgun down some mythic highway with a rock true believer." The San Francisco Chronicle wrote: "Prophet’s voice has grown richer with time and his melodies sharper," and from the popular Seattle radio station KEXP: "If you're as moved by music as Chuck Prophet, you’ll want to listen to his new album."

== Track listing ==
1. "Bobby Fuller Died for Your Sins"
2. "Your Skin"
3. "Open Up Your Heart"
4. "Coming Out in Code"
5. "Killing Machine"
6. "Bad Year for Rock and Roll"
7. "Jesus Was a Social Drinker"
8. "In the Mausoleum"
9. "Rider or the Train"
10. "If I Was Connie Britton"
11. "Post-War Cinematic Dead Man Blues"
12. "We Got Up and Played"
13. "Alex Nieto"

== Charts ==
Chart (2017)	Peak position
Dutch Albums (Album Top 100)	117
UK Americana Albums (OCC)	2
UK Independent Album Breakers (OCC)	8
US Folk Albums (Billboard)	24
US Heatseekers Albums (Billboard)	6
US Independent Albums (Billboard)	24
US Top Alternative Album Sales (Billboard)	19
US Top Rock Album Sales (Billboard)	24
US Top Tastemaker Albums (Billboard)	22
