= Scapegoats (album) =

Studio album by Green on Red
- Released: 1991
- Genre: Rock
- Label: China
- Producer: Al Kooper

Green on Red chronology
Live at the Town and Country Club (1989)	Scapegoats (1991)	Too Much Fun (1992)

Scapegoats is an album by the American band Green on Red, released in 1991. They supported it with a European tour. "Little Things in Life" and "Two Lovers (Waitin' to Die)" were released as singles.

== Production ==
Produced by Al Kooper, who also played keyboards, the album was recorded in Nashville, with Dan Stuart and Chuck Prophet backed by studio musicians that included Dan Penn, Tony Joe White, and Spooner Oldham. The band had considered using Kooper on Here Come the Snakes. Stuart was influenced by what he considered the standard Nashville songwriting "system". "Gold in the Graveyard" is about a graverobber. "Two Lovers (Waitin' to Die)" relates the story of two partners dying of AIDS.

== Critical reception ==
Professional ratings
Review scores
Source	Rating
All Music Guide to Rock	3/5 stars
The Encyclopedia of Popular Music	3/5 stars
The Great Rock Discography	5/10
MusicHound Rock: The Essential Album Guide	3/5 stars
Stafford Post	3/5 stars

The Arizona Daily Star said that "Stuart and guitarist Chuck Prophet ... often recall the Rolling Stones of their Exile on Main Street period, most notably the raggedy guitars on 'Gold in the Graveyard' and the r&b-style horns on 'Blowfly'." The Edgware and Mill Hill Times called the album "a subtle rock [that] betrays the obvious influences of blues and country." The Guardian praised the "warmer texture and ... sonic surprises". The Daily Post describe the songs as "a sort of Tom Waits get the country blues." The Age labeled Scapegoats "a neglected gem". The Stafford Post admired the "vivid tales of fractured lives and damaged dreams".

== Track listing ==
No.	Title	Length
1.	"A Guy Like Me"
2.	"Little Things in Life"
3.	"Two Lovers (Waitin' to Die)"
4.	"Gold in the Graveyard"
5.	"Hector's Out"
6.	"Shed a Tear (For the Lonesome)"
7.	"Blowfly"
8.	"Sun Goes Down"
9.	"Where the Rooster Crows"
10.	"Baby Loves Her Gun"
