= The Lost Weekend (album) =

Studio album by Danny & Dusty
- Released: May 13, 1985
- Recorded: February 1985
- Studio: Control Center, Los Angeles, California
- Genre: Cowpunk
- Label: A&M
- Producer: Paul B. Cutler

Danny & Dusty chronology
The Lost Weekend (1985)	Here's to You Max Morlock - Live in Nuremberg (2007)

Professional ratings
Review scores
Source	Rating
AllMusic	4/5 stars
Robert Christgau	B+
Rolling Stone	Favorable

The Lost Weekend is an album by the American duo Danny & Dusty, released in 1985 by A&M Records. Danny is Dan Stuart from the band Green on Red and Dusty is Steve Wynn from the band the Dream Syndicate. Their backing band featured members of Green on Red, the Dream Syndicate and the Long Ryders.

== Track listing ==
All songs written by Dan Stuart and Steve Wynn except where noted.

Side one:

1. "The Word Is Out" – 3:57
2. "Song for the Dreamers" – 5:05
3. "Miracle Mile" – 4:20
4. "Baby, We All Gotta Go Down" – 4:17

Side two:

1. "The King of the Losers" – 6:10
2. "Send Me a Postcard" – 2:55
3. "Down to the Bone" – 6:20
4. "Knockin' on Heaven's Door" (Bob Dylan) – 5:41

CD bonus track:

9. "Bend in the Road" 4:10

"The Word Is Out" and "Bend in the Road" were recorded in February 1984 and produced by Rick Novak.

== Personnel ==
Danny & Dusty

- Dan Stuart – lead vocals
- Steve Wynn – lead vocals, guitar

with:

- Sid Griffin – guitar, dobro, vocals
- Stephen McCarthy – guitar, lap steel, vocals
- Tom Stevens – bass guitar
- Chris Cacavas – piano
- Dennis Duck (Dennis Mehaffey) – drums, vocals

Technical

- Rick Novak - engineer
- Donald Krieger - art direction, design
- Dennis Mehaffey, Weinzweig - cover concept
- Amy McMillan, Howard Rosenberg - photography

"Special thanks to Jack Waterson, Alex MacNicol, Chuck Prophet IV, Greg Sowders, Mark Walton, Susie Wrenn, Johnette and bartender Bob Breedon from Bob's Frolic Room (Hollywood)."
