= Night Surfer =

Album by Chuck Prophet

Studio album by Chuck Prophet
- Released: September 23, 2014
- Genre: Rock
- Length: 46:23
- Label: Yep Roc
- Producer: Brad Jones, Chuck Prophet

Chuck Prophet chronology
Temple Beautiful (2012)	Night Surfer (2014)	Bobby Fuller Died for Your Sins (2017)

Singles from Night Surfer
- 1. "Wish Me Luck" Released: August 6, 2014

Professional ratings
Review scores
Source	Rating
AllMusic	3.5/5 stars
Consequence of Sound	B
The Irish Times	3/5 stars
PopMatters	8/10 stars
Q	4/5 stars

Night Surfer is a full-length album by American singer-songwriter Chuck Prophet. It was released in the U.S. on September 23, 2014, through Yep Roc Records.

The album was recorded in San Francisco and Nashville, and mixed by Paul Q. Kolderie.

== Critical reception ==
AllMusic wrote: "Whether he's hitting the highway on tour in a beat-up van, harvesting weed in Mexico, or jotting down mental notes about strangers in the park, Prophet has a great eye for details, and these 12 songs are often powerfully evocative and acidly funny, short stories of a memorable life where fate often puts a twist in the tale." Esquire thought that the influence of Prophet's hometown, San Francisco, "is evident in the still psychedelic but also jamming, occasionally neurotic vibe." The Chicago Tribune called Night Surfer "an album that distills some of Prophet's entrancing dichotomies: It's a sloppy and refined, deeply rooted, contemporary garage-rock gem with glimmers of 1960s soul in the production, Alejandro Escovedo in the singing and the Beat poetry tradition in the writing."

== Track listing ==
1. "Countrified Inner-City Technological Man"
2. "Wish Me Luck"
3. "Guilty As a Saint"
4. "They Don't Know About Me and You"
5. "Lonely Desolation"
6. "Laughing on the Inside"
7. "If I Was a Baby" (Ezra Furman)
8. "Ford Econoline"
9. "Felony Glamour"
10. "Tell Me Anything (Turn to Gold)"
11. "Truth Will Out (Ballad of Melissa and Remy)"
12. "Love Is the Only Thing"

== Personnel ==
In alphabetical order

- Peter Buck – E-Bow, Guitar (12 String), Guitar (12 String Electric), Guitar (Resonator), Guitars, Hi String Guitar (Acoustic)
- Chris Carmichael – Viola, Violin
- James DePrato – Banjo, composer, Guitar, Guitars
- Richard Dodd – Mastering
- Stephanie Finch – Vocals
- John Foster – Design
- Ezra Furman – Composer
- Austin Hoke – Cello
- Jim Hoke – Woodwind
- Brad Jones – Bass, Bells, engineer, producer, String Arrangements
- Klipschutz – Composer
- Paul Q. Kolderie – Engineer, Mixing
- Rusty Miller – Arp String Ensemble, Bass, Bells, Hammond B3, Mellotron, Organ, Piano, Vocals, Vox Continental
- Suzy Poling – Photography
- Prairie Prince – Drums, Percussion
- Chuck Prophet – Composer, Guitar, Guitar (12 String Acoustic), Guitars, Primary Artist, producer, Unknown Instrument, Vocals, Wurlitzer
- Bill Rieflin – Drums, Percussion
- Bill Wesemann – Executive Producer
- Matt Winegar – Guitar, Keyboards, Sitar
- Terry Yerves – Assistant Engineer
