= The Killer in Me (disambiguation) =

"The Killer in Me" is a 2003 episode of Buffy the Vampire Slayer.

The Killer in Me may also refer to:

- The Killer in Me, a 2009 album by Amy Speace, or the title track
- The Killer In Me, 2007 ITV1 show featuring Toby Anstis, Fiona Phillips, footballer John Barnes

== See also ==
- The Killer Inside Me (disambiguation)
