= The Killer Inside Me (album) =

Studio album by Green on Red
- Released: 1987
- Studio: Eldorado, Burbank, California; Ardent, Memphis, Tennessee
- Label: Mercury; Phonogram
- Producer: Jim Dickinson

Green on Red chronology
Gas Food Lodging (1985)	The Killer Inside Me (1987)	Here Come the Snakes (1988)

The Killer Inside Me is the third studio album by American rock band Green on Red, released in 1987 by record labels Mercury and Phonogram.

== Reception ==
Professional ratings
Review scores
Source	Rating
AllMusic	3/5 stars
Robert Christgau	C+
Trouser Press	favorable

Robert Palmer of The New York Times said, "This is an angry album, but Mr. Stuart doesn't spare himself; the title tune is a painfully plain-spoken catalogue of his own failings, blaming a domestic crisis entirely on himself. All this angst and venting of spleen might well have resulted in difficult listening, but the lyricism and intensity of Green on Red's music makes the album uplifting rather than depressing."

== Track listing ==
All songs written by Dan Stuart, Chris Cacavas, C.W. Prophet, Jack Waterson.

1. "Clarkesville" - 4:10
2. "Mighty Gun" - 4:17
3. "Jamie" - 3:34
4. "Whispering Wind" - 1:53
5. "Ghost Hand" - 2:47
6. "Sorry Naomi" - 4:25
7. "No Man's Land" - 4:48
8. "Track You Down (His Master's Voice)" - 3:21
9. "Born to Fight" - 3:40
10. "We Ain't Free" - 3:21
11. "Killer Inside of Me" - 5:42

== Personnel ==
Green on Red

- Dan Stuart – vocals, guitar
- Chris Cacavas – piano, harmonica, electric organ, pump organ, prepared piano
- Jack Waterson – bass, double bass
- C.W. Prophet - acoustic, electric, 6-string, 12-string and baritone guitar, vocals; string arrangement on "Killer Inside of Me"
- Keith Mitchell – drums, percussion

with:

- East Memphis Slim – rhythm guitar on "Sorry Naomi"
- Mid Town Slick – 12-string guitar on "No Man's Land"
- The Brown Brothers, The White Sisters - backing vocals

Technical

- Joe Hardy, Mark Ettel - engineer
- Ian Dawson - front cover photography
