= Gravity Talks =

Studio album by Green on Red
- Released: 1983
- Recorded: July 1983
- Genres: Alternative rock, neo-psychedelia
- Label: Slash
- Producer: Chris D.

Green on Red chronology
Gravity Talks (1983)	Gas Food Lodging (1985)

Gravity Talks is the debut album by American rock band Green on Red, released in 1983.

== Production ==
Gravity Talks was recorded at Quad Teck Studios in Los Angeles.

== Critical reception ==
Professional ratings
Review scores
Source	Rating
AllMusic	4/5 stars
The Encyclopedia of Popular Music	3/5 stars
MusicHound Rock: The Essential Album Guide	2.5/5 stars
The Village Voice	B+

The Guardian wrote: "This is music made by high-school geeks who dream of being desperadoes. The result was a brilliant, misguided wreck, halfway to Tulsa when the wheels fell off." Trouser Press wrote that "at the LP’s relative weirdest, Chris Cacavas’ organ- playing sounds like several genres from the ’60s, but only mildly." The Washington Post thought that Green on Red "has fashioned a ragged, primitive musical attack to complement nerve-wracking original songs."

== Track listing ==
All songs written by Dan Stuart, Chris Cacavas, Jack Waterson, and Alex MacNicol.

1. "Gravity Talks"
2. "Old Chief"
3. "5 Easy Pieces"
4. "Deliverance"
5. "Over My Head"
6. "Snake Bit"
7. "Alice"
8. "Blue Parade"
9. "That's What You're Here For"
10. "Brave Generation"
11. "Abigail's Ghost"
12. "Cheap Wine"
13. "Narcolepsy"

== Personnel ==
Green on Red

- Dan Stuart – vocals, guitar
- Chris Cacavas – keyboards, guitar, lap steel, vocals
- Jack Waterson – bass
- Alex McNicol – drums, percussion

Additional personnel

- Matthew Piucci – guitar
- Steve Wynn – guitar, vocals
