= Homemade Blood =

Studio album by Chuck Prophet
- Released: 1997
- Studio: Toast
- Label: Cooking Vinyl
- Producers: Eric Westfall, Chuck Prophet

Chuck Prophet chronology
Feast of Hearts (1995)	Homemade Blood (1997)	The Hurting Business (1999)

Homemade Blood is an album by the American musician Chuck Prophet, released in 1997. Prophet supported the album with a European tour. Homemade Blood, which was considered a breakthrough album for Prophet, was reissued in 2001 by spinART.

== Production ==
Produced by Eric Westfall and Prophet, the album was recorded in 10 days at Toast Studios. Prophet was influenced by the studio habits of Jim Dickinson, with whom he had just worked. Prophet's wife, Stephanie Finch, sings on several tracks. Most of the songs are about suburbia. "Textbook Case" explores the psyche of a killer. Prophet stated at the time that Homemade Blood was his final "two guitar-bass-drum" album.

== Critical reception ==
Professional ratings
Review scores
Source	Rating
AllMusic	4.5/5 stars
Calgary Herald	4.5/5 stars
Fort Worth Star-Telegram	4/4 stars
Orlando Sentinel	4/5 stars
The Province	3/4 stars

The Guardian wrote that "the opening track, 'Credit', plausibly establishes Prophet as the vocalist that Tom Petty might once have been if Jimmy Iovine hadn't drowned his records in 50 fathoms of audio varnish." The Orlando Sentinel determined that "Prophet rocks with more urgency and conviction than many younger players." The Calgary Herald called Prophet "a rock 'n' roll ringer who'd make Johnny Thunders or a young Paul Westerberg smile."

The Province noted that "a hip country and blues awareness colors a garage-punk rock 'n' roll." The Fort Worth Star-Telegram concluded that "Prophet's music is passionately ramshackle, his observations acute." The Times labeled Homemade Blood "a collection of lovingly crafted, rough-edged songs, steeped in an earthy cocktail of country, blues and Rolling Stones-ish rock'n'roll influences." Andrew Smith, of The Sunday Times, listed it as the ninth best album of 1997.

AllMusic called the album "one of his finest achievements," writing that "the band that backs Prophet's fiery guitar work is a roots rock unit tightened up from ceaseless European touring."

== Track listing ==
No.	Title	Length
1.	"Credit"
2.	"You Been Gone"
3.	"Inside Track"
4.	"Ooh Wee"
5.	"New Year's Day"
6.	"22 Fillmore"
7.	"Homemade Blood"
8.	"Whole Lot More"
9.	"Textbook Case"
10.	"Kmart Family Portrait"
11.	"Til You Came Along"
12.	"The Parting Song"
