= Songs for a Blue Guitar =

Studio album by Red House Painters
- Released: July 22, 1996
- Recorded: 1995–1996
- Studios: Record Two Studios, Mendocino County, Comptche, California; Hyde Street Studios, San Francisco; Polk Street Recording, San Francisco
- Genres: Folk rock, slowcore
- Length: 70:42
- Label: Supreme Recordings
- Producer: Mark Kozelek

Red House Painters chronology
Ocean Beach (1995)	Songs for a Blue Guitar (1996)	Retrospective (1999)

Professional ratings
Review scores
Source	Rating
AllMusic	3.5/5 stars
Pitchfork	9.0/10
Rolling Stone	3.5/5 stars

Songs for a Blue Guitar is the fifth studio album by Red House Painters, released on July 22, 1996 in the UK, and a day later in the US. It is effectively a Mark Kozelek solo album, since no other members of the band are listed in the liner notes. The album introduced heavier, electric guitar driven rock to their sound in songs like "Make Like Paper", and Kozelek's cover of Paul McCartney & Wings' "Silly Love Songs".

== Background ==
Recorded while still under contract to the Painters' original label, 4AD, the label chose not to release the album and released the band from their contract. There have been many rumors over the years about the band's departure from the label. The most popular theory claims the band were dropped because label president Ivo Watts-Russell was unhappy with the lengthy guitar solos in "Make Like Paper" and "Silly Love Songs."

Another more probable scenario is that Kozelek was having strained relations with 4AD's American branch, controlled by Warner Bros. Records at the time. Many other 4AD artists of the time, including His Name Is Alive's Warren Defever, complained of the US management while maintaining praise for Ivo. It has also been said that Kozelek offered to release the album as a solo effort if the label didn't think it was a "true Red House Painters" recording, but this offer was also rebuffed. In the end, the album was released shortly after the band signed with Supreme Recordings, a new label owned by filmmaker John Hughes and distributed by Island Records.

Watts-Russell later informally claimed that dropping Red House Painters was the worst decision that 4AD ever took.

The move to a more corporate label proved to be disastrous for the band, who became stuck in limbo during the major-label mergers of the late 1990s. Many alternative rock bands who had been signed in the wake of Nirvana's success were either dropped, or had their recordings held up without the ability to take them elsewhere. The band's next album, Old Ramon, was ready for release on Supreme in early 1998, but was kept in the label's vaults until Kozelek was able to purchase it back and have it released by Sub Pop in 2001.

The album features a cover of Yes' 1971 hit "Long Distance Runaround". RHP's version on this album is a different recording from the one found on the double 10" vinyl pressing of the Painters' previous album Ocean Beach.

A music video, directed by Phil Harder, was produced for the song "All Mixed Up". The video features all four members of Red House Painters—Mark Kozelek on lead guitar, Phil Carney on guitar, Jerry Vessel on banjo, and Anthony Koutsos on drums.

Nearly 13 years after its initial release, Plain Recordings issued Songs for a Blue Guitar on double 12" heavyweight vinyl for the first time in June 2009. A limited number of 500 copies pressed on heavyweight blue-colored vinyl were made available exclusively to Aural Exploits.

== Track listing ==
All tracks are written by Mark Kozelek, except where noted.

No.	Title	Writer(s)	Length
1.	"Have You Forgotten"		6:13
2.	"Song for a Blue Guitar"		5:59
3.	"Make Like Paper"		12:03
4.	"Priest Alley Song"		4:34
5.	"Trailways"		6:41
6.	"I Feel the Rain Fall"		2:35
7.	"Long Distance Runaround"	Jon Anderson	4:41
8.	"All Mixed Up"	Ric Ocasek	5:50
9.	"Revelation Big Sur"		5:48
10.	"Silly Love Songs"	Paul McCartney	11:11
11.	"Another Song for a Blue Guitar"		5:07
Total length:			70:42

== Release history ==
Country	Date	Label	Format	Catalogue #
United Kingdom	July 22, 1996	Supreme Recordings/Island Independent	CD	524 268-2/CID 8050
United States	July 23, 1996	Supreme Recordings/Island Independent	CD	162-531 061-2
United States	June 16, 2009	Plain Recordings	Double LP	plain145
Worldwide	August 14, 2015	Island/UMe	Double LP reissue	2346001

== Personnel ==
- Performed and produced by Mark Kozelek.
  - Backing vocals on "Song for a Blue Guitar" and "All Mixed Up" performed by Stephanie Finch.
- Recorded at:
  - Record Two Studios, Mendocino County, Comptche, California.
  - Hyde Street Studios, San Francisco.
  - Polk Street Recording, San Francisco.
- Mixed at Madhatter Studios, Los Angeles.
  - "Another Song for a Blue Guitar" recorded and mixed at Polk Street Recording.
- Mark Needham – recording engineer.
- Billy Anderson – engineer.
- Darren Mora and Dale Lawton – second engineers at Madhatter.
- Mastered by John Golden at John Golden Mastering, Newbury Park, California.
- Photography by Michele Turriani.
- Art direction and design by Paul McMenamin at v23.

== Singles ==
Although no commercial singles were ever released from the album, two promotional-only CD singles were issued for "All Mixed Up" in July 1996, and for "Make Like Paper" in February 1997. "All Mixed Up" was also featured in the 1997 film Excess Baggage, and a promo single was issued featuring a clip from the film as its artwork.

Supreme Recordings/Island Records, PRCD 7354-2 (alternately titled Red House Painters Sampler):

1. "All Mixed Up" (Edit) – 4:20
2. "All Mixed Up" (Album Version) – 5:50
3. "Make Like Paper" (Album Version) – 12:03

Supreme Recordings/Island Records, PRCD-7459-2:

1. "Make Like Paper" (Edit) – 5:26

Supreme Recordings/Island Records, PRCD 7642-2:

1. "All Mixed Up" (Edit) – 4:20
