= Jenifer McKitrick =

American songwriter

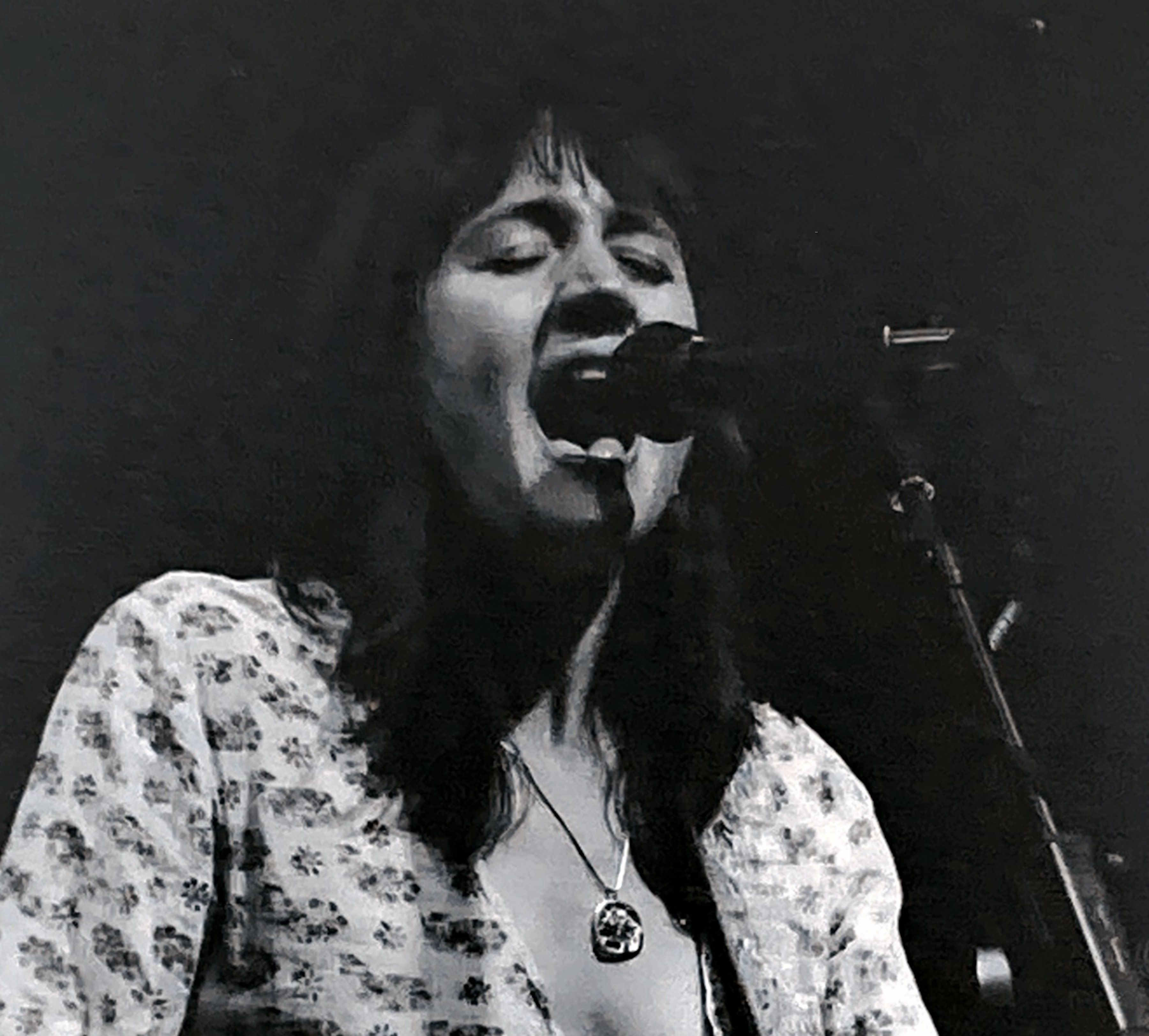
Jenifer McKitrick performing with Orange Sunshine in San Francisco

Jenifer McKitrick (born May 5, 1966) is a songwriter. She was born in Defiance, Ohio. McKitrick was a founding member of bands including the Bettys, Swingin' Doors, Spank the Eggman, the Outskirts, Orange Sunshine, and Some Girls. Currently living in San Francisco , she finished work on a new electronic/soundtrack album, Digitosis, released on August 30, 2022 and an album including new songs and unreleased archival tracks, Road Call, released on December 1, 2022. She is planning a re-issue of Glow on vinyl and CD in 2023. She is currently producing self-directed music videos and "Killer" has been chosen as an Official Selection in the Five Continents International Film Festival in Venezuela. "Killer", along with "I'm Ready (More Your A$$)" are official selections in the Marilyn Monroe Film Festival in Los Angeles.

== Discography ==
- Saved My Soul with the Bettys (1983 cassette), (streaming remaster 2021)
- unhinged with Swingin' Doors (1995)
- Glow (2001) Producers: Sandy Pearlman and Jenifer McKitrick
- Digitosis (Electronic, Instrumental, and Soundtrack) (2021)
- Garage à Trois with The Outskirts (2021)
- Follow the Magic (2021)
- Swingin' Doors Live at the Bottom of the Hill (2021)
- Swingin' (Live Covers(2021)

== Personnel ==
=== The Bettys ===
- Jenifer McKitrick
- Carolyn Getson
- Cecelia Soluri
- Lynn Okiki
- Diane Glaub

=== The Outskirts ===
- Jenifer McKitrick
- Mia Walsh
- Denese Hathaway
- Lisa Brown
- JoAnne Avalon

=== The Swingin' Doors ===
- Jenifer McKitrick
- Dwight Been
- Stephanie Lee
- Diane Glaub
- Todd Duda
- Terry Dowling contributed lap steel and slide guitar on the unhinged album.

=== Glow ===
- Jenifer McKitrick: Vocals, guitars, harmonica
- Chuck Prophet: Guitars
- Katharine Cole: Acoustic guitar, vocals
- Tony Marsico: bass
- Dawn Richardson: Drums and percussion
- Stephanie Lee: Violin
- Chris Von Sneidern: Piano, organ
- Recorded by Noah Rabinowitz and Eric Westfall at Alpha and Omega, San Rafael, CA.
- Additional recording, production and mixing by Chris von Sneidern at Ordophon Studio, San Francisco, CA.
- Mastered by Ken Lee at Kenneth Lee Mastering.
- Tape editing by Paul Stubblebine
- Tape transfer by Laura Hanna.
- Produced by Sandy Pearlman and Jenifer McKitrick

== Guest appearances ==
- Johnny in Monsterland (2021) McKitrick composed the song "Shake the Fear" for the film.
- Gang Vocals, "Run Primo Run" on Chuck Prophet album No Other Love
