= Down Colorful Hill =

Studio album by Red House Painters
- Released: September 14, 1992
- Recorded: 1989–1991
- Genre: Folk rock
- Length: 43:35
- Language: English
- Label: 4AD
- Producer: Mark Kozelek

Red House Painters chronology
| Down Colorful Hill (1992) | Red House Painters (1993) |

Down Colorful Hill is the debut studio album by American band Red House Painters, released in 1992 by 4AD.

== Background ==
As was done with the debuts of previous 4AD artists like Pixies, Lush, and His Name Is Alive, the album is made up of demos that were slightly remixed for general release. In Martin Aston's book Facing the Other Way: The Story of 4AD, Mark Kozelek expressed regret over the reverb- and echo-heavy mixing techniques he employed. The song "Waterkill", which dates from the same sessions but not included here, later appeared on the compilation Retrospective in un-remixed form, giving listeners an idea of the original demos' rawer sound.

A music video was produced for the song "24", directed by Mark Taylor.

The cover artwork for Down Colorful Hill is by Welsh photographer Simon Larbalestier entitled "Bed".

== Reception ==
Professional ratings
Review scores
| Source | Rating |
|---|---|
| AllMusic | 4.5/5 stars |
| Entertainment Weekly | B− |
| Pitchfork | 8.2/10 |
| Q | 4/5 stars |
| The Rolling Stone Album Guide | 3/5 stars |
| Select | 4/5 |

The Philadelphia Inquirer noted that "as glum and mournful as Kozelek's sentiments may be, there's a still, stark autumnal beauty that emerges over the course of this debut that's the pop equivalent of a chilly, fogbound English morning."

AllMusic wrote that "the group has already reached full maturity; these lengthy, ponderous songs are remarkably evocative portraits of a distinctly tortured psyche – Mark Kozelek forgoes the camouflage of metaphor to lay his soul on the line, and the honesty of his craft is both beautiful and disturbing". Stereogum wrote in a 2012 article that the album "sounds dated and immature; the work of a nascent artist who didn't trust his own voice, didn't know his way around a studio and wasn't entirely confident on the guitar. [...] But good lord, what an album."

== Track listing ==
All tracks are written by Mark Kozelek.

| No. | Title | Length |
|---|---|---|
| 1. | "24" | 6:47 |
| 2. | "Medicine Bottle" | 9:49 |
| 3. | "Down Colorful Hill" | 10:51 |
| 4. | "Japanese to English" | 4:42 |
| 5. | "Lord Kill the Pain" | 6:03 |
| 6. | "Michael" | 5:23 |
| Total length: | | 43:35 |

== Release history ==
| Country | Date | Label | Format | Catalogue ref |
|---|---|---|---|---|
| United Kingdom | 1992 | 4AD | CD (first pressings came in a digipak sleeve) | CAD 2014 CD |
| United Kingdom | 1992 | 4AD | LP | CAD 2014 |
| United Kingdom | 1998 | 4AD | CD (reissue) | GAD 2014 CD |
| United States | 1992 | Warner Bros. Records | CD | 9 45062-2 |
| United States | 1999 | 4AD | CD (reissue) | GAD 2014 CD |
