= Gas Food Lodging (album) =

Studio album by Green on Red
- Released: 1985
- Genre: Rock
- Label: Enigma
- Producer: Paul B. Cutler

Green on Red chronology
Gravity Talks (1983)	Gas Food Lodging (1985)	No Free Lunch (1985)

Gas Food Lodging is an album by the American band Green on Red, released in 1985. It was the band's only album for Enigma Records. George Pelecanos references the album in his novel A Firing Offense.

== Recording and production ==
Recorded in five days, Gas Food Lodging was produced by Paul B. Cutler. Chuck Prophet joined the band before the recording sessions for the album. The band incorporated a more pronounced country sound on many of the songs. "We Shall Overcome" is a cover of the gospel anthem. "Sixteen Ways" is about an old man who outlives his many children.

== Critical reception ==
Professional ratings
Review scores
Source	Rating
AllMusic	4/5 stars
Robert Christgau	B−
The Encyclopedia of Popular Music	5/5 stars
Entertainment Weekly	B+
MusicHound Rock: The Essential Album Guide	3.5/5 stars
Martin C. Strong	8/10

Robert Palmer, in The New York Times, wrote that, "musically it's perhaps the most distinctive and accomplished of all the recent 60's-rooted albums"; he later listed the album among the best of 1985. The Ottawa Citizen determined that "the roughness lends the music a measure of down-homeiness, but its stories do not reflect down-home attitudes... This is a bleak view of the American heartland."

The Sunday Times called the album "clanging road music, the driven sounds of Californian boredom." The Omaha World-Herald noted that "the bleak power of a record like Gas Food Lodging [is] akin to New York art bands like Television or the Velvet Underground."

AllMusic concluded: "Gas Food Lodging is too loose and deliberately ramshackle to support the title of masterpiece, but calling it Green on Red's best album will do nicely." Reviewing a reissue, Entertainment Weekly opined that the music could be labeled "garage Americana." In 2023, Paste listed it among "The 70 Best Alt-Country Albums of All Time", opining that it incorporates elements of country music, jangle pop, and psychedelic pop.

== Track listing ==
No.	Title	Length
1.	"That's What Dreams"
2.	"Black River"
3.	"Hair of the Dog"
4.	"This I Know"
5.	"Fading Away"
6.	"Easy Way Out"
7.	"Sixteen Ways"
8.	"The Drifter"
9.	"Sea of Cortez"
10.	"We Shall Overcome"
