= The Killer Inside Me (disambiguation) =

The Killer Inside Me is a 1952 novel by American writer Jim Thompson.

The Killer Inside Me may also refer to:

- The Killer Inside Me (1976 film), a film directed by Burt Kennedy, starring Stacy Keach, based on Thompson's novel
- The Killer Inside Me (2010 film), a film directed by Michael Winterbottom, starring Casey Affleck, also based on Thompson's novel
- The Killer Inside Me (album), an album by Green on Red
- "The Killer Inside Me", a single from the album Welcome to My Dream by MC 900 Foot Jesus
