= Old Ramon =

Studio album by Red House Painters
- Released: April 10, 2001
- Recorded: Fall 1997–spring 1998
- Genres: Folk rock, slowcore
- Length: 71:50
- Language: English
- Label: Sub Pop
- Producer: Mark Kozelek

Red House Painters chronology
Retrospective (1999)	Old Ramon (2001)

Professional ratings
Aggregate scores
Source	Rating
Metacritic	84/100
Review scores
Source	Rating
AllMusic	4/5 stars
Alternative Press	5/5
NME	8/10
Pitchfork	8.0/10

Old Ramon is the sixth and final studio album by American indie rock band Red House Painters, released on April 10, 2001 on Sub Pop. Originally completed in 1998, band leader Mark Kozelek had to wait until 2001 to release the album. The band had previously been signed to Island/Supreme Records, but a series of major label mergers in the late '90s left the band without a label. This meant the album had to be shelved until three years later, when Kozelek managed to buy back the album from Island Records and Sub Pop signed the group.

During the wait for the album's release, Old Ramon built up a reputation as one of the greatest "lost" albums of the modern era, and one of the saddest cases of a band being left in limbo during the major label mergers. Once it was finally released, reviews were generally very positive. Alternative Press gave the album a perfect 5 out 5 rating, praising its "timeless beauty."

Many regard Old Ramon as a more lighthearted, optimistic recording than previous Red House Painters releases. The first track, "Wop-a-Din-Din" is Mark's tribute to his cat, while "Byrd Joel," "Michigan" and "Kavita" are love songs. Elsewhere, however, the languid, lengthy "River" and "Void", and the melancholic "Smokey", confirmed that Kozelek hadn't lost his touch for articulating regret and sadness. The album also retained Songs for a Blue Guitar's mix of introspective acoustic folk-rock and heavier electric rock.

== Track listing ==
All tracks are written by Mark Kozelek.

No.	Title	Length
1.	"Wop-a-Din-Din"	5:37
2.	"Byrd Joel"	6:25
3.	"Void"	9:33
4.	"Between Days"	8:35
5.	"Cruiser"	8:39
6.	"Michigan"	4:50
7.	"River"	11:20
8.	"Smokey"	6:54
9.	"Golden"	3:53
10.	"Kavita"	6:04
Total length:		71:50

== Personnel ==
Red House Painters

- Mark Kozelek
- Anthony Koutsos
- Jerry Vessel
- Phil Carney

with:

- Craig Ross
- David Perales
- Michael Urbano
- Mike Hardwick
- Paul Revelli

== Release history ==
Country	Date	Label	Format	Catalogue #
United States	April 10, 2001	Sub Pop	CD	SPCD 565
United States	April 10, 2001	Sub Pop	Double LP	SP 565
United Kingdom	April 23, 2001	Sub Pop	CD	SPCD 565
