= Ocean Beach (album) =

Studio album by Red House Painters
- Released: March 27, 1995
- Recorded: 1994
- Genres: Folk rock; slowcore
- Length: 54:42
- Language: English
- Label: 4AD
- Producer: Mark Kozelek

Red House Painters chronology
Shock Me EP (1994)	Ocean Beach (1995)	Songs for a Blue Guitar (1996)

Ocean Beach is the fourth studio album by Red House Painters, released in 1995 by 4AD. The album saw the group and Mark Kozelek move toward a more pastoral and folk-influenced arrangement style, in contrast to the lengthy, droning epics that featured on their early albums. Ocean Beach was also the last album to feature founding guitarist Gorden Mack, as well as being the band's last studio album released by 4AD. The album features an unlisted hidden track, referred to as "Brockwell Park (Part 2)" less than 20 seconds after "Drop" ends. The double 10" vinyl release of the album (now long out of print) features the band's acoustic cover of Yes' 1971 hit "Long Distance Runaround." Kozelek would go on to record another version of the song (with electric guitars and an extended outro) for Red House Painters' next album, Songs for a Blue Guitar.

A rarely seen music video shot on 16mm film was directed by Matt Amato for the song "Summer Dress." The video was filmed aboard a vintage street car and at the historic Victoria Theater in San Francisco's Mission District.

An original idea for the album's front cover artwork was a photo of what could be broken pews in an abandoned church, or old beds in an abandoned hospital ward.

== Reception ==
Professional ratings
Review scores
Source	Rating
AllMusic	4.5/5 stars
Chicago Tribune	3/4 stars
Entertainment Weekly	A
The Guardian	3/4 stars
Houston Chronicle	4/5 stars
Pitchfork	8.4/10
Q	4/5 stars
Rolling Stone	4/5 stars
The Rolling Stone Album Guide	4/5 stars
Select	4/5

Caspar Smith of Select gave the album a rating of four out of five, stating that Kozelek "is right up there among the new breed of rootsy singer-songwriters".

Ocean Beach was ranked number 58 by Pitchfork in their original 1999 list of the Top 100 Albums of the 1990s.

== Track listing ==
All tracks are written by Mark Kozelek, except where noted.

No.	Title	Length
1.	"Cabezon"	3:11
2.	"Summer Dress"	2:54
3.	"San Geronimo"	7:39
4.	"Shadows"	6:04
5.	"Over My Head"	7:03
6.	"Red Carpet"	2:36
7.	"Brockwell Park"	3:53
8.	"Moments"	7:54
9.	"Drop" / "Brockwell Park (Part 2)" (Hidden Track)	13:28
Total length:		54:42

=== Double 10" vinyl release ===
Side A
No.	Title	Length
1.	"Cabezon"	3:09
2.	"Summer Dress"	2:52
3.	"San Geronimo"	7:37

Side B
No.	Title	Writer(s)	Length
4.	"Shadows"		6:02
5.	"Over My Head"		7:01
6.	"Long Distance Runaround"	Jon Anderson	2:29

Side C
No.	Title	Length
7.	"Red Carpet"	2:34
8.	"Brockwell Park"	3:51
9.	"Moments"	7:52

Side D
No.	Title	Length
10.	"Drop" / "Brockwell Park (Part 2)" (Hidden Track)	13:26
Total length:		57:12

== Release history ==
Country	Date	Label	Format	Catalogue #
United Kingdom	March 27, 1995	4AD	CD	CAD 5005 CD
United Kingdom	March 27, 1995	4AD	Double 10" LP	DAD D 5005
United Kingdom	July 6, 1998	4AD	CD (reissue)	GAD 5005 CD
United States	March 28, 1995	Warner Bros. Records	CD	9 45859-2
United States	November 2, 1999	4AD	CD (reissue)	GAD 5005 CD

== Notes ==
- Additional musicians: Dan Barbee and Carrie Bradley.
- Recorded and mixed at Coast Recorders, San Francisco.
- Additional recording at Hyde Street Studios, San Francisco; and David Wellhousen's Studio, San Francisco.
- Art direction and design by Paul McMenamin at v23.
- Photography by Melodie McDaniel.
