= Shock Me (EP) =

EP by Red House Painters
- Released: February 28, 1994
- Recorded: 1993
- Studios: Coast Recorders and Razor's Edge, San Francisco, California
- Genres: Slowcore, folk rock
- Length: 20:10
- Language: English
- Label: 4AD
- Producer: Mark Kozelek

Red House Painters chronology
Red House Painters (1993)	Shock Me (1994)	Ocean Beach (1995)

Shock Me is an EP by American slowcore band Red House Painters. It was released in the UK only in 1994 on CD and 12" vinyl by record label 4AD.

== Recording ==
Shock Me was recorded and mixed at Coast Recorders, San Francisco in 1993. Additional recording took place at Razor's Edge, also in San Francisco.

== Content ==
The EP contains two versions of the song "Shock Me," a Kiss cover. The EP went out of print shortly after its initial release. The tracks later surfaced on the reissued edition of Red House Painters (Bridge), released in 1999.

The "untitled instrumental" hidden track is actually an instrumental version of "A Million + 8 Things", a song from the early Red House Painters demo tapes originally recorded sometime between 1989 and 1992. A version of the song containing its original lyrics has never seen an official release.

== Reception ==
Professional ratings
Review scores
Source	Rating
AllMusic	3/5 stars
MusicHound Rock: The Essential Album Guide	3/5 stars

In his retrospective review, Dean Carlson of AllMusic wrote: "this mid-career EP displays a confident, introspective Red House Painters seemingly influenced by a parallel world where Nick Drake shoegazed it up with Ride or Chapterhouse. Somehow, it's quietly splendid."

== Track listing ==
All tracks are written by Mark Kozelek, except where noted.

No.	Title	Writer(s)	Length
1.	"Shock Me"	Ace Frehley	4:49
2.	"Sundays and Holidays"		3:00
3.	"Three-Legged Cat"		1:41
4.	"Shock Me" (Acoustic) / "(Untitled Instrumental)" (Hidden Track)	Frehley; Kozelek	10:40
Total length:			20:10

== Release history ==
Country	Date	Label	Format	Catalogue #
United Kingdom	February 28, 1994	4AD	CD	BAD 4004 CD
United Kingdom	February 28, 1994	4AD	Vinyl	BAD 4004

== Personnel ==
Additional personnel

- Carla Fabrizio
- Dan Barbee
- Larry Ragent

Technical

- Simon Larbalestier – sleeve images
