= Green on Red =

American rock band

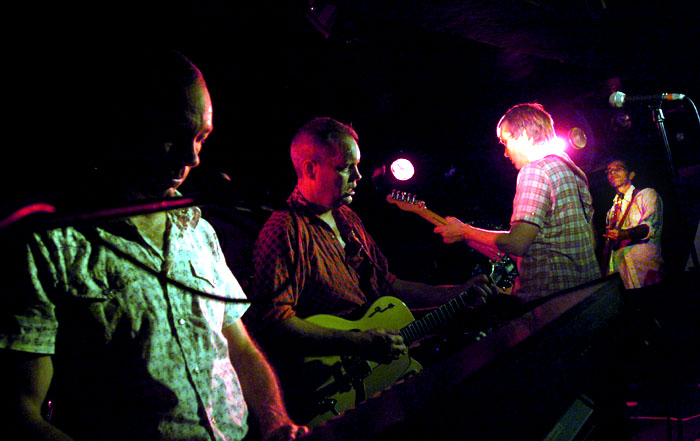

Background information
- Origin: Tucson, Arizona, United States
- Genres: Alternative rock; neo-psychedelia; country rock; garage rock; alternative country
- Years active: 1979–1992; 2005–2006
- Labels: Enigma; Mercury; Slash; China
- Members: Dan Stuart; Jack Waterson; Chris Cacavas; Chuck Prophet
- Past members: Van Christian; Alex MacNicol; Keith Mitchell
- Website: greenonred.net

Green on Red was an American rock band, formed in the Tucson, Arizona punk scene, but based for most of its career in Los Angeles, California, where it was loosely associated with the Paisley Underground. Earlier records have the wide-screen psychedelic sound of first-wave desert rock, while later releases tended more towards traditional country rock.

== History ==
The band began in 1979 as The Serfers, a four-piece made up of Dan Stuart (vocals/guitar), Jack Waterson (bass), Van Christian (drums, later of Naked Prey) (organ), quickly replaced by Chris Cacavas. In the summer of 1980, the Serfers relocated to Los Angeles, where they changed their name to Green on Red (after the title of one of their songs) to avoid confusion with the local surf punk scene. Christian returned to Tucson and was replaced by Lydia Lunch sideman Alex MacNicol.

The band issued an overtly psychedelic, self-released red vinyl EP, sometimes called Two Bibles, though its first widely available record was an EP issued in 1982 by Dream Syndicate leader Steve Wynn on his own Down There label. Green on Red followed the Dream Syndicate onto Slash Records, which released the album Gravity Talks in late 1983. San Francisco-based guitarist Chuck Prophet joined for the 1985 Gas Food Lodging (Enigma), after which MacNicol was replaced on drums by Keith Mitchell (later of Mazzy Star). Also in 1985, Stuart collaborated with Steve Wynn as "Danny & Dusty" on the album The Lost Weekend (A&M).

A major-label deal with Phonogram/Mercury followed, with the 7-song EP No Free Lunch released in summer 1986. A strong country music direction was evident, which music critic Ira Robbins remarked "should finally erase the group's original misassociation with the dreaded paisley underground". The album The Killer Inside Me appeared one year later, produced by Jim Dickinson at Ardent Studios in Memphis. The band split up afterwards; Cacavas began recording albums under his own name. When Stuart returned to recording he decided to use the Green on Red name. In 1989, the band—now consisting of Stuart and Prophet—released Here Come the Snakes. They hired backing musicians, including Christopher Holland on keyboards. In 1991 they released Scapegoats, but after the 1992 album Too Much Fun Stuart stopped using the name.

Post Green on Red, Stuart recorded the album Retronuevo with Al Perry in 1993, and solo effort Can O'Worms in 1995, and then essentially quit the music business; Prophet maintains a career as a solo artist.

However, in September 2005, the band reformed with its "golden era" line-up of Stuart, Cacavas, Prophet and Waterson, with Daren Hess filling in for Alex MacNicol (who had died in 2004) to play a one-off show as part of the celebrations for the 20th anniversary of Club Congress in Tucson. This was followed up by a show in London on 10 January 2006. Also in 2006 'Gas' was performed live in its entirety as part of the All Tomorrow's Parties-curated Don't Look Back series.

In 2007, Stuart and Wynn released their second studio album as Danny & Dusty, Cast Iron Soul, on Blue Rose Records. Danny & Dusty followed up in the same year with Here's to You Max Morlock—Live in Nuremberg, a live double album and DVD.

Dan Stuart formed The Slummers in 2010, with JD Foster, Antonio Gramentieri, and Diego Sapignoli. They released their debut album, Love of the Amateur, and toured Europe a year later.

In 2012, Dan Stuart reemerged in Oaxaca de Juarez, Mexico, and released a new solo record, The Deliverance of Marlowe Billings.

== Discography ==
=== EPs ===
- Two Bibles (Green on Red, 1981)
- Green on Red (Down There, 1982)
- No Free Lunch (Mercury, 1985) - UK No. 99

=== LPs ===
- Gravity Talks (Slash, 1983)
- Gas Food Lodging (Enigma, 1985)
- The Killer Inside Me (Mercury, 1987)
- Here Come the Snakes (Restless, 1989)
- This Time Around (China, 1989)
- Scapegoats (China, 1991)
- Too Much Fun (Off Beat, 1992)

=== Lives and compilations ===
- Live At The Town And Country Club (China Records 1989)
- The Little Things in Life (China Records 1991)
- Archives: What We Were Thinking (Normal Records, 1998)
- Valley Fever - Live at the Rialto (Blue Rose Records - CD + DVD 2006)
- BBC Sessions (Maida Vale Records, 2007)

== Side projects ==
=== Danny & Dusty ===
- The Lost Weekend (A&M Rec. – 395 075-1) CCD + LP 1985
- Cast Iron Soul (Blue Rose Rec. – BLUDP 0418) CD + DVD 2007
- Here's To You, Max Morlock (Blue Rose Rec. – BLUDP 0531) DCD + DVD 2007

=== Al Perry & Dan Stuart ===
- Retronuevo (Normal, 1993)

=== Dan Stuart ===
- Can O'Worms (Monkey Hill, 1995)
- Dan Stuart: 4 Songs (Padre Lindo, 2011)
- The Deliverance of Marlowe Billings (Cadiz Music, 2012)
