= Red House Painters (Rollercoaster) =

Studio album by Red House Painters
- Released: May 24, 1993
- Recorded: Summer 1992 – Spring 1993
- Studios: Undisclosed recording studio on Divisadero Street, San Francisco
- Genres: Slowcore; dream pop; folk rock
- Length: 75:38
- Language: English
- Label: 4AD
- Producer: Mark Kozelek

Red House Painters chronology
Down Colorful Hill (1992)	Red House Painters (1993)	Red House Painters (1993)

Red House Painters is the second album by American band Red House Painters, released on May 24, 1993 by 4AD. The album is often referred to as Rollercoaster or Red House Painters I to distinguish it from the band's second eponymous album, often referred to as Bridge.

A double album, Red House Painters features fourteen songs culled from bandleader Mark Kozelek's back-catalog. The album received highly positive reviews from critics upon release, with praise directed at the album's melancholic instrumentation and emotional depth.

== Background ==
The album follows Red House Painters' 1992 debut Down Colorful Hill, and the recording sessions spawned twenty-three songs culled from leader/producer Mark Kozelek's back-catalog, fourteen of which comprised the Rollercoaster album. Two songs featured on the record, “Funhouse” and “Strawberry Hill,” had previously been featured on a 90 minute demo tape recorded by the band between 1989 and 1992, alongside tracks from Down Colorful Hill. “Dragonflies” and “Brown Eyes” had also previously been recorded as demos, and which were later released as part of the bands 1999 Retrospective compilation album. Eight songs left over from the recording sessions would make up the band's second self-titled album. Kozelek's lyrics focus on themes of pain, desolation and loss, while musically the album runs from the folk-pop of "Grace Cathedral Park" to the shoegaze of "Mistress" to the stark "New Jersey" and onto the soundscapes of "Funhouse" and "Mother". Kozelek said of the recording sessions, "It was a nightmare, because the initial excitement of recording twenty-three songs became, 'one down, twenty-two to go' ... And I was nervous that people were now paying attention, but Ivo [Watts-Russell, 4AD label owner] made helpful suggestions and never demanded anything. If we went over budget, we went over budget." Watts-Russell also suggested the album be a double album, and compiled the track listing himself.

Kozelek discussed his views of the album in the foreword of the 2002 and revised 2008 editions of his book of lyrics, Nights of Passed Over: "... I know the Rollercoaster album is many people's favorite. But for me, it is and will always be the most difficult to get through. I hadn't heard it in years, and though there are some beautiful things I had forgotten about -- a delicate piano in "Things Mean a Lot", the way the band brings life to "Brown Eyes" midway through, and the chorus of "Strawberry Hill", which was sung by a group of strangers we gathered from outside the Divisadero Street studio where we were recording—what I remembered most, even when I look at the album's cover, is nine months of worry."

The album cover is a sepia-toned picture of the now-demolished Thunderbolt roller coaster at Coney Island.

== Reception ==
Professional ratings
Review scores
Source	Rating
AllMusic	5/5 stars
Pitchfork	9.0/10
Q	5/5 stars
Rolling Stone	3/5 stars
The Rolling Stone Album Guide	4/5 stars
Uncut	8/10

In a contemporary review, James Greer of Spin wrote that Red House Painters "rewards patient listening with a rare and sublime ecstasy." The album peaked at number 63 upon its initial release on the UK Albums Chart in 1993.

Marc Hawthorne of The A.V. Club later cited Red House Painters as Mark Kozelek's "crowning achievement in a discography that has placed him alongside the greatest songwriters of all time". In a 5-star review, Jason Ankeny of AllMusic hailed the album as a "sprawling, remarkable set distinguished by Mark Kozelek's continuing maturation as a songwriter" and concluded that "the songs resonate with depth and poignancy, and rank as Kozelek's most fully realized collection of compositions." In September 2010, Pitchfork included "Katy Song" at number 162 on their Top 200 Tracks of the 1990s.

== Track listing ==
All tracks are written by Mark Kozelek; "Dragonflies" co-written by Robyn Riel-Nail.

No.	Title	Length
1.	"Grace Cathedral Park"	3:51
2.	"Down Through"	2:38
3.	"Katy Song"	8:22
4.	"Mistress"	4:05
5.	"Things Mean a Lot"	3:23
6.	"Funhouse"	9:18
7.	"Take Me Out"	4:48
8.	"Rollercoaster"	4:17
9.	"New Jersey"	3:58
10.	"Dragonflies"	3:58
11.	"Mistress" (piano version)	4:32
12.	"Mother"	13:06
13.	"Strawberry Hill"	7:34
14.	"Brown Eyes"	1:47
Total length:		75:38

== Release history ==
Country	Date	Label	Format	Catalogue #	Notes
United Kingdom	May 24, 1993	4AD	CD	DAD 3008 CD	
United Kingdom	May 24, 1993	4AD	Double LP	DAD 3008	
United Kingdom	July 6, 1998	4AD	CD (reissue)	GAD 3008 CD	
United States	May 25, 1993	Warner Bros. Records	CD	9 45256-2	
United States	November 2, 1999	4AD	CD (reissue)	GAD 3008 CD	
Worldwide	April 18, 2015	4AD	Double LP	CAD 3409	Bronze-coloured vinyl, as part of the Red House Painters box set
Worldwide	August 14, 2015	4AD	Double LP	CAD 3409	Black vinyl, released individually

== Personnel ==
- Images by W.K.V.L.

Though no other credits are printed on the release, the following is a de facto list of the performers on the album:

Red House Painters

- Mark Kozelek – vocals, guitar, piano
- Gorden Mack – guitar
- Jerry Vessel – bass
- Anthony Koutsos – drums
