= Red House Painters (Bridge) =

Studio album by Red House Painters
- Released: October 18, 1993
- Recorded: Summer 1992 – spring 1993
- Studios: Undisclosed recording studio on Divisadero Street, San Francisco
- Genres: Folk rock, slowcore
- Length: 45:01
- Language: English
- Label: 4AD
- Producer: Mark Kozelek

Red House Painters chronology
Red House Painters (1993)	Red House Painters (1993)	Shock Me EP (1994)

Professional ratings
Review scores
Source	Rating
AllMusic	3.5/5 stars
Rolling Stone	3.5/5 stars
Pitchfork	7.9/10

Red House Painters (also known as Bridge or Red House Painters II to distinguish it from the first eponymous album, also known as Rollercoaster or Red House Painters I) is the third album by the group Red House Painters, released on October 18, 1993 by 4AD. The album is made up of songs from the same recording sessions for Rollercoaster.

At the beginning of the album opener "Evil," the faint laughter of Mark Kozelek and the barely audible voice of a woman playfully saying "No" can be heard. Both “Evil” and “Uncle Joe” were re-recorded versions of early demos, originally recorded sometime between 1989 and 1992. The album also includes two covers: a sunny version of "I Am a Rock" by Simon and Garfunkel, and Francis Scott Key's "The Star-Spangled Banner", which displays an off-beat dark humor. An acoustic version of the song "New Jersey" was on Red House Painters I. In the US, 4AD added the Shock Me EP as bonus tracks to the CD when the RHP catalog was reissued in 1999, to bring the total number of tracks to 12.

== Track listing ==
All tracks are written by Mark Kozelek, except where noted.

No.	Title	Writer(s)	Length
1.	"Evil"		7:21
2.	"Bubble"		5:30
3.	"I Am a Rock"	Paul Simon	5:32
4.	"Helicopter"	Kozelek, Jerry Vessel	5:22
5.	"New Jersey" (Electric Version)		4:24
6.	"Uncle Joe"		5:58
7.	"Blindfold"		8:26
8.	"The Star-Spangled Banner"	Francis Scott Key, John Stafford Smith; arranged by Mark Kozelek	2:28
Total length:			45:01

Bonus tracks
No.	Title	Writer(s)	Length
9.	"Shock Me"	Ace Frehley	4:49
10.	"Sundays and Holidays"		3:00
11.	"Three-Legged Cat"		1:41
12.	"Shock Me" (Acoustic) / "(Untitled Instrumental)" (Hidden Track)	Frehley; Kozelek	10:40
Total length:			65:11

== Release history ==
Country	Date	Label	Format	Catalogue #
United Kingdom	October 18, 1993	4AD	CD	CAD 3016 CD
United Kingdom	October 18, 1993	4AD	LP	CAD 3016
United Kingdom	July 6, 1998	4AD	CD (reissue)	GAD 3016 CD
United States	October 19, 1993	Warner Bros. Records	CD	9 45441-2
United States	November 2, 1999	4AD	CD (reissue with 4 bonus tracks)	GAD 3016 CD
Japan	January 26, 1994	Nippon Columbia	CD	COCY-75898

== Notes ==
- Images by Simon Larbalestier.
