= Red House Painters =

American rock band

- Red House Painters in 1993. From left to right: Gorden Mack, Jerry Vessel, Mark Kozelek, Anthony Koutsos

Background information
- Origin: Atlanta, Georgia, U.S.
- Genres: Slowcore; indie rock; sadcore; folk rock; alternative rock
- Years active: 1988–2001
- Labels: 4AD; Sub Pop; Polygram/Supreme
- Spinoffs: Sun Kil Moon
- Past members: Mark Kozelek; Anthony Koutsos; Jerry Vessel; Gorden Mack; Phil Carney

Red House Painters were an American rock band formed in Atlanta, Georgia, in 1988. Founded by singer-songwriter and guitarist Mark Kozelek, along with drummer Anthony Koutsos, the band relocated to San Francisco, California where they were joined by bassist Jerry Vessel and guitarist Gorden Mack in 1989. Phil Carney would later replace Gorden Mack as the band's guitarist. The group released 6 studio albums and an EP, before dissolving in 2001, and are considered to be a pioneering act of the slowcore subgenre.

== History ==
While in Atlanta, Georgia, Ohio-born Kozelek became friends with Anthony Koutsos, a drummer. Following the breakup of his former band, God Forbid, Kozelek and Koutsos decided to form a new band, called Red House Painters, in 1988. Despite some live and studio efforts, the pair found trouble getting signed to record labels in Atlanta. They then moved to San Francisco, California, in 1989, adding guitarist Gorden Mack and bassist Jerry Vessel to complete the line-up for Red House Painters. After forming, the group played the San Francisco scene extensively, and recorded demos from 1989 to 1992. The band were signed to 4AD in 1992, on the strength of a demo tape passed to 4AD boss Ivo Watts-Russell by American Music Club frontman Mark Eitzel.

Journalist Martin Aston passed on a tape that Mark Eitzel had given to him. Never before or since had I received a demo that was 90 minutes long! In fact, it was quite some time before I actually listened to the whole thing all the way through. Every morning and evening, driving to and from work, I would start at the beginning, "24" (I know, I know, what more do you need to hear, right? What a song.), but only get about half way through that and whatever the second song on the tape was before arriving home/at 4AD. When I finally did listen to the full 90 minutes I called young Mark K. and left him a message. I learned later he was sitting in the bath listening to me talk. It was a perfect time for me to hear that brilliant band.

— Ivo Watts-Russell

Between September 1992 and March 1995, the band released three LPs, one double LP, and one EP. Their first 4AD release was an album made up of demos entitled Down Colorful Hill. In 1993, the group came out with two self-titled records (now commonly referred to as Rollercoaster and Bridge because of their cover artwork).

In early 1994, they released an EP entitled Shock Me, featuring two cover versions of an Ace Frehley–written Kiss song. The introspective Ocean Beach followed in spring 1995. Founding guitarist Gorden Mack left shortly after the album's release, and he was replaced shortly thereafter by Phil Carney.

While Kozelek was beginning work on a solo project, he parted ways with 4AD after a tumultuous relationship, so Songs for a Blue Guitar was eventually released on Island Records subsidiary Supreme Recordings/Polygram in summer 1996. The album featured lengthy guitar jams and cover songs, and was the band's biggest seller in the U.S. By early 1998, their sixth album was completed. However, the band was beginning to dissolve, and major label mergers during the late 1990s would leave the record in limbo; it was not until 2001 that Old Ramon was issued on the Sub Pop label.

== Dissolution and post-breakup ==
Prior to the release of Old Ramon, Kozelek released a solo seven-song EP entitled Rock 'n' Roll Singer in 2000. The record consisted of three original acoustic compositions with minor full-band arrangements and four covers (three from Bon Scott–era AC/DC, and John Denver's "Around and Around") that further revealed Kozelek's fascination with 1970s classic rock. Six months later, Kozelek released his first solo album, What's Next to the Moon, which was made up entirely of acoustic covers of even more Bon Scott–era AC/DC songs, including re-recorded versions of the tracks that had appeared on the previous EP. The record was uncharacteristic of Kozelek (though he was prone to covering songs by his favorite artists) in that it is one of the shortest full-length albums of his to date, clocking in at just over thirty minutes. Both the EP and album were released by Badman Recordings.

4AD would release the best-of package, Retrospective, in July 1999. Kozelek subsequently contributed to the AIDS benefit album The Shanti Project Collection, and organized and appeared on Take Me Home: A Tribute to John Denver, a John Denver tribute album (along with like-minded artists like Bonnie "Prince" Billy, Low, and the Innocence Mission). He also dabbled in acting, playing small parts in the Cameron Crowe films Almost Famous and Vanilla Sky, as well as appearing more prominently as a rock musician alongside Jason Schwartzman in the 2005 Steve Martin film Shopgirl.

Phil Carney occasionally accompanies Kozelek on tour dates, playing second guitar. Drummer Anthony Koutsos is also a real estate agent in San Francisco.

== Sun Kil Moon ==
In 2003, Kozelek and Koutsos, along with Geoff Stanfield and Tim Mooney, reformed as Sun Kil Moon, releasing the acclaimed album Ghosts of the Great Highway on Jetset Records. Following the release of Old Ramon, Kozelek discussed plans for a seventh Red House Painters record, expected to release in 2002. Despite this album never materializing, many of the songs present on Ghosts of the Great Highway originated as Red House Painters songs, most notably "Duk Koo Kim", which the band played frequently during their 2001 tour. In a 2005 interview with The A.V. Club, Kozelek confirmed that he considered Sun Kil Moon essentially a continuation of Red House Painters, but that he changed the band name to grab the interest of critics who had gotten bored with, or stopped paying attention to, his previous band.

== Musical style ==
The band's sound has been described as slowcore, indie rock, sadcore, folk rock and alternative rock.

== Members ==
Former members

- Mark Kozelek – vocals, guitar, piano (1988–2001)
- Anthony Koutsos – drums (1988–2001)
- Jerry Vessel – bass guitar (1989–2001)
- Gorden Mack – guitar (1989–1995)
- Phil Carney – guitar (1995–2001)

== Discography ==
=== Studio albums ===
- Down Colorful Hill
- Red House Painters I
- Red House Painters II
- Ocean Beach
- Songs for a Blue Guitar
- Old Ramon

=== Compilation albums ===
- Retrospective (July 19, 1999)
- Red House Painters (a 6LP vinyl box set collecting the 4AD albums and Shock Me EP; Record Store Day exclusive) (April 18, 2015)

=== EPs ===
- Shock Me (February 28, 1994)
- ’Local Anesthetic’ KFOG Studios, SAN Francisco, December 3, 1995. (Live) (February 14, 2020)

=== Promo singles ===
- "Mistress" (May 1993)
- "I Am a Rock"/"New Jersey" (October 1993)
- "Summer Dress" (April 1995)
- "All Mixed Up" (July 1996)
- "Make Like Paper" (February 1997)

=== Soundtracks and songs in films ===
- "Have You Forgotten" (in Vanilla Sky)
- "Japanese to English" (in Amateur)
- "All Mixed Up" (in Excess Baggage)
- "Song for a Blue Guitar" (in The Girl Next Door)
- "Around and Around" (in Tarnation)
- "Katy Song" (in Totally F***ed Up)
- "Priest Alley Song" (in The Line)
- "Song for a Blue Guitar" (in Togetherness "For the Kids": S02E08, Series Finale)
- "Katy Song" (in Juliet, Naked)

=== Appearances on various artists compilations ===
- Milkshake – A CD to Benefit the Harvey Milk Institute on timmi-kat ReCoRDS (1998)
- Shanti Project Collection on Badman/Symbiotic Records (1999)
- Take Me Home: A Tribute to John Denver on Badman Records (2000)
