= Sid Griffin =

American musician

- Born: September 18, 1955 (age 70); Louisville, Kentucky, United states
- Genres: Americana, alternative bluegrass
- Occupations: Singer; songwriter; instrumentalist; bandleader; author
- Instruments: Vocals, guitar, mandolin
- Years active: 1980s-present
- Labels: Prima Records, Island
- Website: www.sidgriffin.com

Albert Sidney "Sid" Griffin (born September 18, 1955) is an American singer, songwriter, guitarist-mandolinist, bandleader, and author who lives in London, England. He led the Long Ryders band in the 1980s, founded the Coal Porters group in the 1990s, has recorded several solo albums and is the author of volumes on Bob Dylan, Gram Parsons and bluegrass music.

== Early life ==
Griffin was born in Louisville, Kentucky. He is an eighth-generation Kentuckian. After graduating from Ballard High School in eastern Louisville and playing in a band called The Frosties, Griffin attended the University of South Carolina, receiving a bachelor's degree in journalism in 1977. He then moved to Los Angeles, California, to launch a career as a musician.

== Career ==
He briefly played in the punk band Death Wish before joining Shelley Ganz to form the Unclaimed in 1979. Steeped in the garage band ethos of the 1960s, the Unclaimed released a self-titled four-track EP on the Moxie label in September 1980, which included the early Griffin compositions "Time to Time" and "Deposition Central".

Griffin left the Unclaimed in November 1981, along with band's bassist Barry Shank, to form the nascent Long Ryders, adding Greg Sowders on drums and, after a period of searching, guitarist Stephen McCarthy. Shank resigned from the band to pursue a doctoral degree after a year, and British musician Des Brewer took over on bass in time for the Long Ryders' debut EP, 10-5-60 (1983). Tom Stevens then replaced Brewer and joined Griffin, Sowders and McCarthy for the Long Ryders' Native Sons (1984), the band's first full-length album on Frontier Records, and two subsequent major label releases, State of Our Union (1985) and Two-Fisted Tales (1987), on Island Records. The Long Ryders broke up in December 1987. In January 2016, the European label Cherry Red Records released a four-CD box set, Final Wild Songs, comprising the band's original three full-length albums, their one EP, various rarities and demos, and a 15-song live Benelux radio performance. The label also put out expanded, multi-disc versions in 2018 of State of Our Union and Two-Fisted Tales.

As the Americana music movement took hold in subsequent years, the Long Ryders' reputation flourished, with the band frequently cited as the godfathers of the genre. Periodic one-off band reunions also spurred interest, leading to short tours in Europe and occasional shows in America. These performances and the desire to play new material led to a formal relaunching of the Long Ryders, with a new album, Psychedelic Country Soul, arriving in early 2019 on the Cherry Red label in Europe and Omnivore in the U.S. Psychedelic Country Soul became No. 1 on the Americana/Alt-Country chart in the U.K. and topped Amazon UK's Americana sales chart also.

Besides the Long Ryders, Griffin has also been the bandleader of the Coal Porters, which he put together while living in Los Angeles. The Coal Porters were initially rooted in the music of the Byrds, Gram Parsons, and the Buffalo Springfield, playing country and country rock songs but evolved into an acoustic group playing a hybrid of folk and bluegrass after Griffin moved to London in the early 1990s. The last Coal Porters' lineup consisted of Griffin on vocals and mandolin, Neil Robert Herd on guitar and vocals, Kerenza Peacock (Adele, Seasick Steve, Paul Weller) on fiddle and vocals, Paul Fitzgerald on banjo and vocals, and Andrew Stafford on bass. The Coal Porters disbanded on July 12, 2018.

This lineup came together again in fall 2025 for a nine-date reunion tour, playing mostly sold-out shows in Ashford, Birmingham, Newcastle, Edinburgh, Filey, Hastings, London, Pocklington and Beccles. Griffin celebrated his 70th birthday at the London performance, where he was joined on stage by Billy Bragg, Jon House from the theatrical production Wilko, and several former members of the band.

In addition to the Long Ryders' catalog and eight full-length albums and two EPs credited to the Coal Porters, Griffin has recorded five solo discs: Little Victories (1997), the performance collection Worldwide Live 1997–2002 (2002), As Certain as Sunrise (2005), The Trick Is to Breathe (2014) and The Journey from Grape to Raisin (2024). Little Victories includes a version of Phil Ochs' "Sailors and Soldiers". The Trick Is to Breathe, released in September 2014, was recorded in Nashville with producer Thomm Jutz and features such supporting musicians as Rounder Records artist Sierra Hull on mandolin, Justin Moses on banjo and fiddle, and Grammy-winner Mark Fain (Ricky Skaggs) on bass. Producer Jutz also helmed The Journey from Grape to Raisin, which was released by Label 51 Recordings. MOJO magazine awarded the album four stars.

In addition, the Griffin-led country rock band Western Electric released a 2000 self-titled album. Also in the band were Neil Robert Herd and Pat McGarvey from the Coal Porters on various string instruments and former Weather Prophets and Rockingbirds drummer Dave Morgan. Griffin has also worked as a producer, helming the Lindisfarne album Here Comes the Neighbourhood (1998).

Griffin published his first book, Gram Parsons – A Musical Biography (Sierra Books), in 1985. The volume includes interviews with Emmylou Harris, Chris Hillman, Peter Fonda and other artists who associated with Parsons during his days with the International Submarine Band, the Byrds, the Flying Burrito Brothers and as a solo performer.

Griffin's second book, Bluegrass Guitar: Know the Players, Play the Music, appeared in 2005 (Backbeat Books) with Eric Thompson as co-author. This volume includes profiles on Mother Maybelle Carter, Doc Watson, Clarence White, Norman Blake, Tony Rice and Bryan Sutton, as well as chapters on equipment, techniques and an instructional CD.

Griffin then published two volumes focusing on Bob Dylan. Million Dollar Bash: Bob Dylan, The Band, and The Basement Tapes appeared in 2007 (Jawbone Press), followed by Shelter from the Storm in 2010 (Jawbone Press). Bill Wasserzieher of the garage rock journal Ugly Things, in a review of Million Dollar Bash, called Griffin "an Aesop-meets-Rabelais" storyteller. A revised and expanded second edition of Million Dollar Bash appeared in November 2014 to coincide with Sony's release of The Basement Tapes in an unabridged, six-disc format, for which Griffin provided the introductory essay. In addition, Griffin has written booklet essays for numerous albums and contributed to such publications as Mojo, Q, NME, Rock 'n' Reel, and The Guardian. He is also the co-author of the BBC television documentary Gram Parsons: Fallen Angel. Griffin also serves as a periodic commentator on popular music for BBC radio and television. He is also an on-camera commentator on a number of documentaries covering the careers of such major musicians as John Lennon, Paul McCartney, Bob Dylan, Keith Richards, Jimi Hendrix, Elton John, Adele, Reba McEntire, Gene Clark, Amy Winehouse, Ringo Starr, and Van Halen.

The Americana Music Association and the Museum of Country Music in Nashville, Tennessee, honored Griffin's more than 30 years in music with a career retrospective on Sept. 10, 2010, with David Fricke of Rolling Stone as moderator. Excerpts from program may be viewed on YouTube. The complete program is available also at the Sid Griffin website. Griffin also served as the keynote speaker at the Americana Music Association UK Conference in London on Feb. 1, 2017.

In 2022, Sid Griffin was on hand to accept the International Trailblazers Award on behalf of the Long Ryders from the Americana Music Association UK. Griffin and his band are also part of an exhibition at the Country Music Hall of Fame in Nashville entitled "Western Edge: The Roots and Reverberations of Los Angeles Country-Rock.” His lyric sheets for the songs “Looking for Lewis and Clark” and “Gunslinger Man” are on display, as well as band photos, posters, album covers and an interactive listening station where visitors can hear Long Ryders recordings. The exhibition is scheduled to continue to May 2025.

== Discography ==
=== The Unclaimed ===
- The Unclaimed EP (1980)

=== The Long Ryders ===
- 10-5-60 EP (1983)
- Native Sons (1984)
- State of Our Union (1985)
- Two-Fisted Tales (1987)
- Metallic B.O. (1989)
- BBC Radio One Live in Concert (1994)
- Looking for Lewis and Clark: the Long Ryders Anthology (1998)
- Three Minute Warnings: the Long Ryders Live in New York City (2003)
- The Best of the Long Ryders (2004)
- State of Our Reunion (2004)
- Final Wild Songs (2016)
- Psychedelic Country Soul (2019)

=== The Coal Porters ===
- Rebels Without Applause (1991)
- Land of Hope and Crosby (1994)
- Los London (1995)
- EP Roulette (1998)
- The Gram Parsons Tribute Concert (1998)
- The Chris Hillman Tribute Concerts (2001)
- How Dark This Earth Will Shine (2004)
- Turn the Water On, Boy (2008)
- Durango (2010)
- Find the One (2012)
- No. 6 (2016)

=== Western Electric ===
- Western Electric (2000)

=== Solo ===
- Little Victories (1997)
- Worldwide Live 1997–2002 (2002)
- As Certain as Sunrise (2005)
- The Trick Is to Breathe (2014)
- The Journey from Grape to Raisin (2024)

== Videos ==
- Ode To Bobbie Gentry – Sid Griffin (2014)
- Looking For Lewis and Clark – The Long Ryders
- The Day The Last Ramone Died – The Coal Porters (Official Video) (2016)

== Bibliography ==
- Gram Parsons: A Music Biography. Sierra Books, 1985. ISBN 0-916003-01-9.
- Bluegrass Guitar: Know the Players, Play the Music. Backbeat Books, 2005. ISBN 0-87930-870-2.
- Million Dollar Bash: Bob Dylan, The Band, and the Basement Tapes. Jawbone Books, 2007. ISBN 978-1-906002-05-3.
- Shelter from the Storm: Bob Dylan's Rolling Thunder Years. Jawbone Books, 2010. ISBN 978-1-906002-27-5.
