= Stephanie Finch =

American singer-songwriter

Stephanie Finch is an American singer, keyboardist and guitarist. As well as being a solo artist, she has frequently recorded and toured with her husband Chuck Prophet, and is a longtime member of Prophet's band, The Mission Express.

== Career ==
Her first album, Hotel San Jose, was released in 2007 under the band name Go Go Market (named after a San Francisco corner store). Finch cowrote eight of the songs with Chuck Prophet and klipschutz (pen name of Kurt Lipschutz).

Her second release, in 2010, was Cry Tomorrow, under the band name Stephanie Finch & The Company Men. She cowrote some of the songs with Randall H. Homan, and one with klipschutz. The disc featured “She’s the One,” a Randy Newman cover originally written for the failed music TV series Cop Rock.

Finch provided backing vocals for the Red House Painters songs “Song for a Blue Guitar” and “All Mixed Up” (Songs for a Blue Guitar, 1996).
