= Here Come the Snakes =

Studio album by Green on Red
- Released: 1989
- Studios: Sam C. Phillips, Memphis, Tennessee
- Genre: Rock
- Label: Restless
- Producers: Jim Dickinson, Joe Hardy

Green on Red chronology
The Killer Inside Me (1987)	Here Come the Snakes (1989)	Live at the Town and Country Club (1989)

Here Come the Snakes is an album by the American band Green on Red, released in 1989. The album cover photo, titled "Afterward from the Democratic Forest", is by William Eggleston.

== Production ==
Recorded in Memphis, the album was produced by Jim Dickinson and Joe Hardy. Band members Dan Stuart and Chuck Prophet were backed by local musicians. Stuart and Prophet used the Sam C. Phillips Recording Studio, where they worked with Roland Janes. "We Had It All" is a cover of the song made popular in part by Keith Richards.

== Critical reception ==
Professional ratings
Review scores
Source	Rating
AllMusic	4/5 stars
Chicago Tribune	2/4 stars
Robert Christgau	B+
The Encyclopedia of Popular Music	4/5 stars
MusicHound Rock: The Essential Album Guide	3.5/5 stars

Trouser Press wrote: "Again switching easily among rock, blues and country idioms, what's left of Green on Red sounds relaxed and confident, a warm and boozy vehicle for Stuart's amusingly wry regrets and social observations." Robert Christgau said that "Stuart reemerges on Jim Dickinson's shoulder as Neil Young and Mick Jagger fried into one bar singer."

The Chicago Tribune opined that "things bottom out on 'Tenderloin', a roiling, bluesy affair with a spoken monolog about failed love that, if it were delivered from a barstool by a tavern patron, would lead any saloonkeeper to close up early." The Vancouver Sun noted that "Stuart is still at the top of his art—it's just a little too disturbing for mass consumption." In 1990, The Times deemed Here Come the Snakes the best album of 1989, writing that Green on Red was "the most scandalously overlooked band of the last decade."

AllMusic wrote that, "from the get-go, Prophet's guitar is the cornerstone to the Let It Bleed mood that fires this record."

== Track listing ==
All tracks are written by Chuck Prophet and Dan Stuart; except where noted.

No.	Title	Writer(s)	Length
1.	"Keith Can't Read"		3:22
2.	"Rock n Roll Disease"		3:08
3.	"Morning Blue"		3:58
4.	"Zombie for Love"		3:53
5.	"Broken Radio"		3:52
6.	"Change"		5:01
7.	"Tenderloin"		5:02
8.	"Way Back Home"		2:29
9.	"We Had It All"	Donnie Fritts, Troy Seals	3:33
10.	"D.T. Blues"		2:52

== Personnel ==
Green on Red

- Chuck Prophet – guitar, vocals
- Dan Stuart – lead vocals, guitar

with:

- René Coman – bass
- Jim Dickinson – drums
- Paul Ebersold – piano
- Ed Kollis – harmonica
- The Zombie Choir – vocals
