= Dan Stuart =

American musician (born 1961)

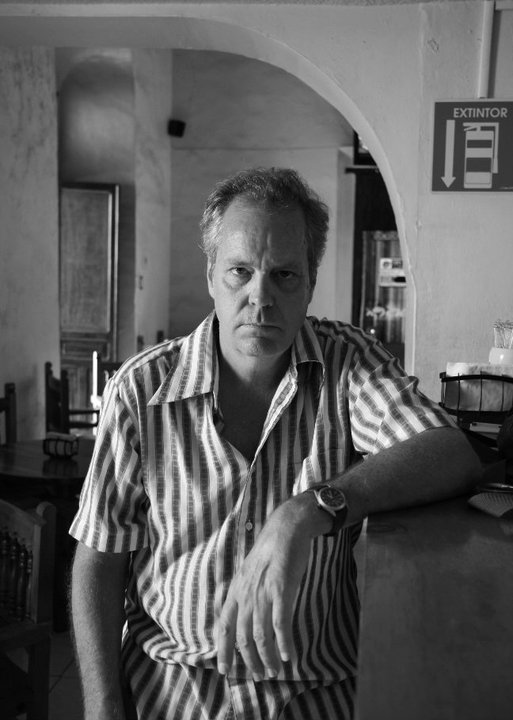
- Stuart in Oaxaca in 2011

Background information
- Born: Daniel Gordon Stuart; 1961 (age 64–65); Los Angeles, California, United States
- Genres: Rock
- Occupation: Singer

Daniel Gordon Stuart (born March 5, 1961, Los Angeles) is an American musician and author best known as the lead singer of the rock band Green on Red (other members included Chuck Prophet, Chris Cacavas and Jack Waterson), his teaming with Steve Wynn as Danny & Dusty, a trilogy of "Marlowe Billings" solo records released from 2012 - 2018 and three novels, The Deliverance of Marlowe Billings (2014), The Unfortunate Demise of Marlowe Billings (2018) and Marlowe's Revenge (2022).

== History ==
Raised in Tucson, Arizona, Dan Stuart founded punk band The Serfers in 1979. The next year the band moved to LA, changed the name to Green On Red, and became associated with the paisley underground (along with Rain Parade and The Dream Syndicate). After releasing two EPs, the band recorded their first full album, Gravity Talks for Slash Records in 1983. Green On Red toured America and Europe extensively and released eight more records before disbanding in 1992. In that time, Stuart worked with producers Jim Dickinson, Glyn Johns, and Al Kooper.

Danny & Dusty recorded and released The Lost Weekend album in 1985.

After Green On Red, Stuart recorded the album Retronuevo with Al Perry in 1993, and solo effort Can O'Worms in 1995, before largely leaving the music business.

He would return for a Green On Red reunion in 2006, and a second Danny & Dusty record, Cast Iron Soul in 2007.

The Slummers, a band he started with producer JD Foster, released Love Of The Amateur, produced by Italian guitar player/composer Antonio Gramentieri, in 2010.

Stuart released a second solo album, The Deliverance of Marlowe Billings, summer 2012.

Dan Stuart, Arizona: 1993-95, a double cd featuring Can O'Worms and Retronuevo plus a never released EP was released in 2013.

The Deliverance of Marlowe Billings is also the title of "a false memoir" written by Stuart and published in 2014.

Stuart released a third solo album, Marlowe's Revenge, recorded with Mexican band Twin Tones in 2015, mixed by JD Foster, and released February 2016.

Summer 2018, Stuart released The Unfortunate Demise of Marlowe Billings, recorded with producer/guitarist Danny Amis (Los Straitjackets, Raybeats). The record is a companion piece to a novel of the same name.

Stuart is currently residing in Tucson, AZ after nearly a decade in Mexico.

The third and final novel in the Marlowe trilogy Marlowe's Revenge - October 2022.

== Discography ==
Green On Red

- Two Bibles (EP, Green on Red, 1981)
- Green on Red (EP, Down There, 1982)
- Gravity Talks (Slash, 1983)
- Gas Food Lodging (Enigma, 1985)
- No Free Lunch (EP, Mercury, 1985)
- The Killer Inside Me (Mercury, 1987)
- Here Come the Snakes (Restless, 1989)
- This Time Around (Mercury, 1989)
- Scapegoats (China, 1991)
- The Little Things in Life (China Records 1991)
- Too Much Fun (Off Beat, 1992)
- Archives: What We Were Thinking (Normal Records, 1998)
- Valley Fever — Live at the Rialto (Blue Rose, 2006)
- BBC Sessions (Maida Vale Records, 2007)

Danny & Dusty

- The Lost Weekend (A&M, 1985)
- Cast Iron Soul (Blue Rose, 2007)
- Here's To You, Max Morlock (Blue Rose 2007)

Al Perry & Dan Stuart

- Retronuevo (Normal,1993)

The Slummers

- Love of The Amateur (Blue Rose, 2010)

Dan Stuart

- Can O'Worms (Monkey Hill, 1995)
- Dan Stuart - 4 Songs (Padre Lindo, 2011)
- The Deliverance of Marlowe Billings (Cadiz Music, 2012)
- Arizona : 1993-95 (Cadiz Music, 2013)
- A little Guitar...and a little more (Padre Lindo, 2015)
- Marlowe's Revenge (Fluff and Gravy Records, 2016)
- The Unfortunate Demise of Marlowe Billings - record + novel (Cadiz Music, 2018)

== Bibliography ==
=== Novels ===
- The Deliverance of Marlowe Billings (Cadiz Music, 2014)
- The Unfortunate Demise of Marlowe Billings (Cadiz Music, 2018)
- Marlowe's Revenge (R&R Press, 2022)

=== Poetry ===
- Barcelona Blues (Padre Lindo Press, 2014)
