= Coal Porters =

British-American bluegrass band

The Coal Porters
- Origin: Los Angeles, California, United States
- Genres: Bluegrass
- Label: Prima Records
- Members: Sid Griffin; Neil Herd; Kerenza Peacock; Andrew Stafford; Paul Fitzgerald
- Past members: Pat Johnson; Carly Frey; John Breese; Dick Smith; Paul Sandy; Gemma White; Matt Woolvett; Pat McGarvey; Bob Stone; Andy Steele; Rob Childs; Will Morrison; Kevin Morris; Dave Morgan; Ian Gibbons; Graham Chesters; John Bennett; Ian Thomas; Toby Petrie; Chris Buessem; Andy Kaulkin; Billy Block
- Website: www.thecoalporters.com

The Coal Porters were a British-American bluegrass band headquartered in London and led by Sid Griffin (mandolin, autoharp, harmonica and vocals) and Neil Robert Herd (guitar and vocals). The group disbanded in July 2018. The other members were Kerenza Peacock (fiddle, vocals), Paul Fitzgerald (banjo, vocals) and Andrew Stafford (bass, vocals). Griffin formed the group in Los Angeles in 1989 and then reorganised the band after moving to London.

== Personnel ==
Sid Griffin was a founding member of The Long Ryders and is the author of Shelter From The Storm: Bob Dylan's Rolling Thunder Years; Million Dollar Bash: Bob Dylan, The Band and The Basement Tapes; co-author of Bluegrass Guitar: Know the Players, Play the Music; and Gram Parsons – A Music Biography. He has contributed reviews and feature articles to Mojo, Q, The Guardian and appears every six weeks on BBC Radio 2 to discuss cultural changes on the Mark Radcliffe-Stuart Maconie Show.

Neil Robert Herd, in addition to his career as a musician, has performed as a comedian. He has also promoted many British comedy, film and music festivals.

Kerenza Peacock has played fiddle with Adele on her recorded hits and also performed with Seasick Steve and Paul Weller.

Andrew Stafford played bass and adds vocals.

Paul Fitzgerald is something of a banjo legend in his native Kent.

This lineup came together again in fall 2025 for a nine-date reunion tour, playing mostly sold-out shows in Ashford, Birmingham, Newcastle, Edinburgh, Filey, Hastings, London, Pocklington and Beccles. Griffin celebrated his 70th birthday at the London performance, where he was joined on stage by Billy Bragg, Jon House from the theatrical production Wilko, and several former members of the band.

== History ==
Nine full-length albums and two EPs are credited to the Coal Porters. Their last release, No. 6, appeared in September 2016 on the Prima label, distributed in the UK by Proper and in the US by Burnside. Producer John Wood, best known for his work with Fairport Convention, John Martyn, Cat Stevens, Sandy Denny, Nick Drake, the Incredible String Band, Pink Floyd, Nico and Squeeze, was at the controls at Strongroom Studios in London, with Simon Filiali co-credited for engineering. Wood mixed the release and Andy Miles and Simon Heyworth mastered the project at the Super Audio Mastering facility in Devon, UK.

No. 6 offers 9 tracks written by band members and a bluegrass rethinking of The Only Ones' Another Girl, Another Planet. Included among the tracks are Griffin's tribute to The Ramones, The Day The Last Ramone Died, Herd's Save Me From The Storm and Peacock's Play A Tune. The other tracks are Shelter From The Storm, The Blind Bartender, Chopping The Garlic, Salad Days, Unhappy Anywhere, Train No. 10-0-5 and The Old Style Prison Break. The album title reflects the number of releases the Coal Porters have issued since shifting from their country-rock beginnings to alternative bluegrass.

Their preceding album, Find The One, from 2012, also offers 10 tracks written by various band members, as well as covers of David Bowie's Heroes and the Rolling Stones' Paint It, Black. Richard Thompson joins the Coal Porters on the song Hush U Babe/Burnham Thorpe, and famed BBC presenter Brian Matthew provides a guest introduction to Griffin's Ask Me Again. Among the other tracks are Red-Eyed & Blue, Brand New Home, The BetseyTrotwood, Gospel Shore and You Only Miss Her When She's Gone.

Durango, the Coal Porters' 2010 compact disc, also appeared on the Prima label. Ed Stasium recorded the 12-track CD in Durango, Colorado, the Southern Colorado town for which the album is named. Songs include No More Chains, Roadkill Breakdown featuring Tim O'Brien as guest mandolinist, and Peter Rowan's Moonlight Midnight, with Rowan joining the Coal Porters for the session.

Their preceding CD, Turn The Water On, Boy! (2008), received four-star reviews in Mojo, Uncut, The Sunday Times, Maverick and Word magazines. The dozen-track album features original songs by Griffin, Herd and other band members, as well as a bluegrass revamping of the Long Ryders' Final Wild Son, a cover of former Byrds member Gene Clark's Silver Raven and a guest appearance by another member of the Byrds, Chris Hillman, who plays mandolin on a tribute to Woody Guthrie. Earlier bluegrass-style Coal Porters' albums are How Dark This Earth Will Shine (2004), with Peter Case and Amy Rigby as guests, and the live Chris Hillman Tribute Concerts (2001), featuring run-ups of songs from Hillman's career with the Byrds, the Flying Burrito Brothers, Manassas and Desert Rose.

The evolution to bluegrass from country-rock occurred after Griffin produced Lindisfarne's Here Comes The Neighborhood album in 1998. Inspired by that band's acoustic instrumentation, he and Herd worked up bluegrass versions of their Coal Porters' (and occasional Long Ryders') repertoire and debuted them successfully at a London charity event for Children in Need at Royal Festival Hall. The band's earlier country-rock albums are the following: the live Gram Parsons Tribute Concert (1999), EP Roulette (1998), Los London (1995), Land of Hope and Crosby (1994) and the initial EP Rebels Without Applause (1991).

Griffin formed The Coal Porters in 1989 following the demise of The Long Ryders. The Coal Porters, like their predecessors, initially demonstrated strong Byrds and Gram Parsons influences, playing country and country-rock songs written by Griffin with occasional collaborators. Before the band's initial line-up fell into place, a number of Griffin's musician friends made appearances at early gigs and performed on first recordings, including drummer Greg Sowders from The Long Ryders and Billy Bremner of Rockpile.

By 1991, the band had solidified with Griffin on lead vocals and guitar, Chris Buessem lead guitar, Ian Thomson bass, Billy Block drums and Andy Kaulkin keyboards. Tracks featuring this line-up appeared on the EP Rebels Without Applause, Land of Hope and Crosby and Los London. By then Griffin and Thomson had relocated to the United Kingdom, while Block opted for a career in Nashville and Kaulkin moved to the business side of music to run Epitaph Records and found the ANTI- label. Subsequent UK members have included Kevin Morris (Dr. Feelgood), John Bennett (High Llamas), Ian Gibbons (Kinks), and Rob Childs (Otis Lee Crenshaw).

== Discography ==
- Rebels Without Applause (1991)
- Land of Hope and Crosby (1994)
- Los London (1995)
- EP Roulette (1998)
- Gram Parsons Tribute Concert (1999)
- Chris Hillman Tribute Concert (2001)
- How Dark This Earth Will Shine (2004)
- Turn the Water On, Boy (2008)
- Durango (2010)
- Find The One (2012)
- No. 6 (2016)

== Videos ==
- Gram Parsons Tribute Concert (1999)
- The Day The Last Ramone Died – The Coal Porters (Official Video)

== Related links ==
- Official website
- Coal Porters on Facebook
