= Chuck Prophet =

American songwriter

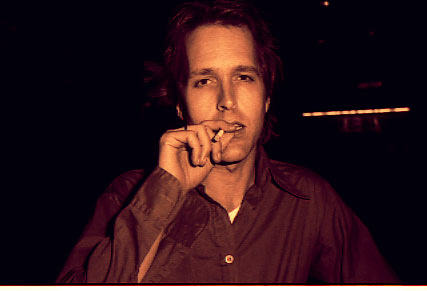
- Prophet in the club Thumb's Up, in Yokohama, Japan

Background information
- Born: Charles William Prophet; June 28, 1963 (age 63); Whittier, California
- Genres: Alternative country; rock
- Occupations: Singer-songwriter; guitarist; record producer
- Instrument: Guitar
- Years active: 1985–present
- Labels: Yep Roc; New West; Cooking Vinyl
- Formerly of: Green on Red
- Website: www.chuckprophet.com

Charles William Prophet (born June 28, 1963) is an American singer-songwriter, guitarist and record producer. Prophet first achieved notice in the American psychedelic/desert rock group Green on Red, with whom he toured and recorded in the 1980s. He has also recorded a number of solo records, and gained prominence as a musician and songwriter.

== Life and career ==
Chuck Prophet was born in Whittier, California.

After recording one E.P. and eight albums with rock group Green on Red, Prophet began working with fellow musician and later wife Stephanie Finch. He released his first solo record, Brother Aldo, on Fire Records in 1990. It was not released in the U.S. until 1997.

Prophet was signed to New West Records by Peter Jesperson in 2002. He made two records for New West: No Other Love and Age of Miracles. After years of mostly European and UK success, 2002's No Other Love was a breakthrough record for Prophet in the U.S. due to the success of the single "Summertime Thing" and Lucinda Williams giving him the opening slot for her summer tour.

Prophet was signed to Yep Roc Records in 2007.

Recorded in San Francisco and Nashville, 2007's Soap and Water received critical praise. Prophet toured Europe and North America in support of the album and appeared with his band on the Late Show with David Letterman and Last Call with Carson Daly. To better motivate the various musicians and engineers who were involved in the production of this album, Prophet gave them a stake in the master recordings.

Prophet has contributed to several Kelly Willis records, and produced 2007's Translated From Love for Rykodisc. Willis and Prophet co-wrote six of the album's tracks and Prophet played guitar.

Evangeline Recording Co. released a limited-edition work entitled Dreaming Waylon's Dreams, which he recorded in San Francisco. The record re-creates Waylon Jennings' 1975 album Dreaming My Dreams in its entirety and features members of American Music Club and Meat Beat Manifesto. The package and booklet were printed by Bruce Licher (Savage Republic, Independent Music Project, REM fan club etc.) using a custom letterpress design on original stock. Included in the packaging is a recounting of the events surrounding the recording of the record by close friend John Murry, who also played on the record. Each piece was printed and numbered by hand on a circa 1930s printing press. Dreaming Waylon's Dreams was released as a limited edition of 1000. Released by Rounder Records in 2001, Raisins in the Sun was a one-off collaboration with Jules Shear, Harvey Brooks, Paul Q. Kolderie, Jim Dickinson, Sean Slade, and Winston Watson, recorded in May 1999.

In 2008, Prophet co-wrote all the songs on Alejandro Escovedo's Real Animal, to which he also contributed guitar and vocals. The LP was recorded in Lexington, Kentucky and produced by Tony Visconti.

In May 2009, Prophet headed to Mexico City with a band of musicians including Ernest "Boom" Carter to record a collection of "political songs for non political people". ¡Let Freedom Ring! was released on October 27, 2009, on Yep Roc. Michael Hoinski of The Village Voice compared ¡Let Freedom Ring! to Bruce Springsteen's Born in the U.S.A., citing the recordings as "albums that manifest patriotism through disenchantment, and both rely heavily on marginalized characters to expose socioeconomic woes."

In January 2011, he formed the Spanish Bombs along with Chris Von Sneidern and San Francisco rhythm section The Park. The Spanish Bombs performed The Clash's LP London Calling in its entirety at the Actual Music Festival in Spain. The project came at the invitation of curators Houston Party. This festival show was followed by a 12-date tour of Spain.

February 7, 2012, was the release date of the Temple Beautiful CD, a "nuanced, insightful and passionate ode to San Francisco" on Yep Roc Records. It was met with positive reviews, scoring 82 on Metacritic. The title track, "Temple Beautiful" (featuring Roy Loney of the Flamin' Groovies), was proclaimed "Coolest Song in the World" on Little Steven's Underground Garage.

On March 3, 2013, Prophet played a benefit concert at The Great American Music Hall for Tom Mallon, a producer who documented much of the San Francisco punk scene and went on to produce the early American Music Club records. Mallon at that time had a brain tumor, which he died of in 2014. Members of many seminal San Francisco bands played as well, including members of American Music Club, Frightwig, Ugly Stick, and Flying Color.

On September 23, 2014, Prophet released Night Surfer on Yep Roc Records. The album was met with positive reviews, including a three-and-a-half out of five star rating from All Music Guide.

On February 10, 2017, Prophet released Bobby Fuller Died For Your Sins. The album was given four out of five stars from All Music Guide.

On February 19, 2017, he appeared on the BBC Sunday-morning political show The Andrew Marr Show, singing "Bad Year for Rock and Roll," one of the tracks from Bobby Fuller Died For Your Sins.

In 2018, Prophet was tapped to co-write and produce a new LP for The Rubinoos. From Home, released in 2019, was recorded at Hyde Street Studios in San Francisco, formerly Wally Heider Studios, where the group made some of its first recordings.

On August 21, 2020, Prophet released The Land That Time Forgot, his fourteenth solo album on Yep Roc Records. Critics praised Prophet's songwriting, storytelling, and lyrical insight. Many reviews highlighted the album as a “21st‑century exorcism” and a timely reflection on America, framed through Prophet's personal and political observations.

On October 25, 2024, Prophet in collaboration with Qiensave, a cumbia-urbana band out of Salinas, California, released Wake The Dead. Wake The Dead hit number one on the AMA/CDX Top 50 Album radio charts, marking his first top spot on that chart.

== Songwriting ==
In 1996, Prophet was signed to Funzalo Music BMG Publishing and spent much of 1997 in Nashville as a staff writer.

=== Collaborations and covers ===
Prophet's songs and co-writes have been recorded by many other artists, including Alejandro Escovedo, Bruce Springsteen, Solomon Burke, Heart, Michael Grimm, Kim Carnes, Aaron Lee Tasjan, Peter Wolf, Kim Richey, Carter's Chord, SistaStrings, Jace Everett, Arc Angels, Penelope Houston, Julie Christensen, Latin Soul Syndicate, Micky & the Motorcars, Peter Mulvey, Bun E. Carlos, Mark Erelli, Mofro, Kevin Bowe, Calvin Russell, The Cadillac Three, Ryan Hamilton, Chris Knight, Dan Penn and Kelly Willis. He has toured with Memphis producer and pianist Jim Dickinson, who recorded Prophet's "Hungry Town", which was co-written with klipschutz. In Nashville, Tennessee, Prophet and songwriter Kim Richey penned "I'm Gone" in 2002 for singer Cyndi Thomson.

=== Work with klipschutz ===
Prophet's primary co-writer over three decades is Kurt Lipschutz, or klipschutz. Their collaborations since Prophet's second solo album total over 100 songs. On the San Francisco-centric Temple Beautiful (2012), they share credit on every song. Their writing process starts by sitting "in a small room" and shooting "gloomy looks at each other". Prophet's cumbia-inflected 2024 release Wake The Dead includes eight Prophet/klipschutz co-writes.

Between 2000 and 2010, the duo stopped writing together due to what was jokingly described by klipschutz as “falling out over money – there was too much of it” and by Prophet as "creative differences".

Prophet and klipschutz have written a theatrical musical, Temple Beautiful: The Musical, inspired by their album of the same name and including characters from the album.

Klipschutz is also a poet. His eight collections include The Erection of Scaffolding for the Re-Painting of Heaven by the Lowest Bidder (1985, o.p.), This Drawn & Quartered Moon (2013), and Premeditations (2019).

== The Mission Express ==
The Mission Express is Prophet's band, named after a bus line that runs through his neighborhood.

=== Line-up ===
- Stephanie Finch (singing, Vox organ, piano, guitar)
- Mike Anderson (bass guitar)
- Vicente Rodriguez (drums, vocals)
- James DePrato (guitar, lap steel)

==== Former members ====
- Kyle Caprista (drums, vocals) 2012–2013
- Paul Taylor (drums, vocals) –2012
- Kevin White (bass)

== Selected discography ==
=== Solo ===
- 1990: Brother Aldo (Fire / Rough Trade)
- 1992: Balinese Dancer (China / Homestead)
- 1995: Feast of Hearts (China)
- 1997: Homemade Blood (Cooking Vinyl)
- 1999: The Hurting Business (Cooking Vinyl)
- 2000: Homemade Boot (Live At Roskilde June 29, 1997) (Corduroy)
- 2000: Turn the Pigeons Loose (Live In San Francisco 2000) (Cooking Vinyl) released 2004
- 2002: No Other Love (New West / Blue Rose)
- 2004: Age of Miracles (New West / Blue Rose)
- 2007: Soap and Water (Cooking Vinyl / Yep Roc)
- 2007: Dreaming Waylon's Dreams (Evangeline)
- 2009: ¡Let Freedom Ring! (Cooking Vinyl / Yep Roc)
- 2012: Temple Beautiful (Yep Roc)
- 2014: Night Surfer (Yep Roc / Belle Sound)
- 2017: Bobby Fuller Died for Your Sins (Yep Roc)
- 2020: The Land That Time Forgot (Yep Roc)
- 2024: Wake the Dead (Yep Roc)

=== With Green on Red ===
- 1985: Gas Food Lodging (Enigma)
- 1985: No Free Lunch (Mercury)
- 1987: The Killer Inside Me (Mercury)
- 1989: Here Come the Snakes (Restless)
- 1989: Live at the Town & Country (China)
- 1989: This Time Around (Off-Beat / China)
- 1989–92: BBC Sessions (Cooking Vinyl) released 2007
- 1991: Scapegoats (China)
- 1992: Too Much Fun (Off-Beat / China)
- 2005: Live at the Rialto (Blue Rose)

=== With Jules Shear, Jim Dickinson, Harvey Brooks, Sean Slade, Paul Q. Kolderie, Winston Watson ===
- 2001: Raisins in the Sun (Evangeline)

=== With Jim Dickinson and the Creatures of Habit ===
- 1997: Thousand Footprints in the Sand (Last Call)

=== As guest musician ===
- 1986: Eddie Ray Porter – When The Morning Falls (Less Records)
- 1986: True West – Hand Of Fate (CD Presents)
- 1991: Sonya Hunter – Favorite Short Stories (Heyday / Normal)
- 1992: Paul Collins – Paul Collins (DRO)
- 1996: Bob Neuwirth – Look Up (Watermelon)
- 1997: Calvin Russell – Calvin Russell (Last Call)
- 1998: Cake – Prolonging the Magic (Capricorn)
- 1998: Penelope Houston – Tongue (WEA / Reprise)
- 1998: The Silos – Heater (Checkered Past / Normal)
- 1999: Kelly Willis – What I Deserve (Rykodisc)
- 2000: Warren Zevon – Life'll Kill Ya (Artemis)
- 2001: Penelope Houston – Loners, Stoners And Prison Brides (Return To Sender)
- 2001: Jenifer McKitrick – Glow (Jenomatic)
- 2002: Kelly Willis – Easy (Rykodisc)
- 2002: Kim Richey – Rise (Lost Highway)
- 2003: Duane Jarvis – Delicious (Slewfoot)
- 2004: Cake – Pressure Chief (Columbia)
- 2004: Kim Carnes – Chasin' Wild Trains (Spark Dawg)
- 2005: Jeffrey Halford and the Healers – Railbirds (Shoeless)
- 2012: Victor Krummenacher – I Was A Nightmare But I'm Not Going To Go There (Veritas Recordings)
- 2022: Jenifer McKitrick – "Road Call" (Jenomatic Records)
