= Stacey Q discography =

- Studio albums: 5
- EPs: 1
- Compilation albums: 1
- Singles: 13
- Music videos: 6
- Promotional singles: 4

American singer Stacey Q has released five studio albums, one compilation album, one extended play, thirteen singles, four promotional singles, and six music videos. Born Stacey Swain, she first served as the lead singer of the band SSQ put together by producer Jon St. James.

Swain first began to work on solo material in 1985. She continued her collaboration with St. James and SSQ's original line-up. Her self-titled EP was released by On the Spot Records. Shortly after its release, Swain was signed to Atlantic Records and released her debut studio album Better Than Heaven (1986). It debuted at number fifty-nine on the US Billboard 200 and was certified gold in the United States. The first single released from the album was "Two of Hearts," which was praised by critics and was a commercial success. It peaked at number three on the Billboard Hot 100 and became one of the highest-selling singles of 1986. The second single, "We Connect," was also successful, peaking at number thirty-five on the Hot 100 chart. "Insecurity" and "Music out of Bounds" and were also released as singles but did not perform as well as its predecessors.

Swain released her second album Hard Machine in February 1988. It spawned three singles: "Don't Make a Fool of Yourself," "I Love You," and "Favorite Things." Her third album Nights Like This (1989) marked a musical departure from her previous material. Drawing influence mostly from house and freestyle music, received positive reviews from music critics. However, it was a commercial failure and became Swain's first album not to reach the Billboard 200.

== Albums ==
=== Studio albums ===
List of studio albums, with selected chart positions, sales figures and certifications
| Title | Album details | Peak chart positions | | Certifications |
| Title | Album details | US | AUS | Certifications |
|---|---|---|---|---|
| Better Than Heaven | Released: October 17, 1986; Label: Atlantic; Formats: Vinyl, CD, cassette | 59 | 36 | |
| Hard Machine | Released: February 1988; Label: Atlantic; Formats: Vinyl, CD, cassette | 115 | – | |
| Nights Like This | Released: June 8, 1989; Label: Atlantic; Formats: Vinyl, CD, cassette | – | – | |
| Boomerang | Released: October 21, 1997; Label: ENo Records; Formats: CD | – | – | |
| Color Me Cinnamon | Released: February 14, 2010; Label: Hydra Productions; Formats: CD, digital download | – | – | |

=== Compilation albums ===
| Title | Album details |
|---|---|
| Stacey Q's Greatest Hits | Released: May 16, 1995; Label: Thump Records; Format: CD, cassette |

=== Extended plays ===
| Title | Album details |
|---|---|
| Stacey Q | Released: 1985; Label: On the Spot; Format: Cassette |

== Singles ==
=== As lead artist ===
List of singles as lead artist, with selected chart positions and certifications, showing year released and album name
| Title | Year | Peak chart positions | | | | | | | | | | | Album |
| Title | Year | US | US Dance | AUS | AUT | CAN | FR | GER | NZ | SWE | SWI | UK | Album |
|---|---|---|---|---|---|---|---|---|---|---|---|---|---|
| "Shy Girl" | 1985 | 89 | – | – | – | – | – | – | – | – | – | – | Stacey Q |
| "Two of Hearts" | 1986 | 3 | 4 | 7 | 24 | 1 | 18 | 6 | 4 | 19 | 6 | 87 | Better Than Heaven |
| "We Connect" | 1986 | 35 | 14 | 7 | – | – | – | 32 | – | – | – | – | Better Than Heaven |
| "Insecurity" | 1987 | – | 1 | 77 | – | – | – | – | – | – | – | – | Better Than Heaven |
| "Music out of Bounds" | 1987 | – | 19 | – | – | – | – | – | – | – | – | – | Better Than Heaven |
| "Don't Make a Fool of Yourself" | 1988 | 66 | 4 | 73 | – | – | – | – | – | – | – | – | Hard Machine |
| "I Love You" | 1988 | – | 49 | – | – | – | – | – | – | – | – | – | Hard Machine |
| "Favorite Things" | 1988 | – | – | – | – | – | – | – | – | – | – | – | Hard Machine |
| "Give You All My Love" | 1989 | – | 16 | – | – | – | – | – | – | – | – | – | Nights Like This |
| "Heartbeat" | 1989 | – | – | – | – | – | – | – | – | – | – | – | Nights Like This |
| "Two Hot for Love" | 1993 | – | – | – | – | – | – | – | – | – | – | – | Non-album single |
| "Trip" | 2009 | – | – | – | – | – | – | – | – | – | – | – | Color Me Cinnamon |
| "Pandora's Box" | 2010 | – | – | – | – | – | – | – | – | – | – | – | Color Me Cinnamon |
| "Going Goth" | 2010 | – | – | – | – | – | – | – | – | – | – | – | Color Me Cinnamon |
"—" denotes a recording that did not chart or was not released in that territory.

=== Promotional singles ===
| Title | Year | Album |
|---|---|---|
| "Better Than Heaven" | 1986 | Better Than Heaven |
| "Favorite Things" | 1988 | Hard Machine |
| "Tenderness" | 1997 | Boomerang |
| "Trick or Treat" | 2011 | Non-album single |

== Videography ==
=== Music videos ===
List of music videos, showing year released and directors
| Title | Year | Director(s) |
|---|---|---|
| "Two of Hearts" | 1986 | Peter Lippman |
| "We Connect" | 1987 | Greg Gold |
| "Insecurity" | 1987 | Visionwear |
| "Don't Make a Fool of Yourself" | 1988 | Tony Van De Nend |
| "I Love You" | 1988 | Rupert |
| "Give You All My Love" | 1989 | Jane Simpson |
