= Stacey Q's Greatest Hits =

Greatest hits album by Stacey Q
- Released: May 16, 1995
- Recorded: 1982–1995
- Genre: Dance-pop; synthpop; house; eurodance
- Length: 57:52
- Label: Thump
- Producer: Jon St. James; Carlo Zanella; Stacey Swain; Karl Moet; Skip Hahn; John Van Tongeren

Stacey Q chronology
Nights Like This (1989)	Stacey Q's Greatest Hits (1995)	Boomerang (1997)

Professional ratings
Review scores
Source	Rating
AllMusic	4/5 stars

Stacey Q's Greatest Hits is a greatest hits album by American singer Stacey Q, released on May 16, 1995 by Thump Records. It was re-released on February 6, 2007 under the title Queen of the 80's with a slightly different track listing. Although it is a greatest hits album, the compilation includes only songs from her studio album Better Than Heaven (1986) and her early career with the band SSQ. Some of the album's material was re-recorded, giving the originally dance-pop and synthpop songs house and eurodance music to achieve more commercial sound.

The compilation features fourteen tracks, including her hit singles "Two of Hearts" and "We Connect", as well as other songs from her studio album Better Than Heaven. Other songs were taken from the album Playback (1983), recorded with the band SSQ. The songs "Playback", "Video Girl" and "Music's Gone" had previously appeared on an extended play recorded with Q and the song "Shy Girl" appeared on the Stacey Q extended play. The previously unreleased songs on the album are "The Model" and "Heartless".

== Track listings ==
Stacey Q's Greatest Hits (1995)
No.	Title	Writer(s)	Length
1.	"Two of Hearts"	John Mitchell	4:54
2.	"Love or Desire"	Jon St. James	4:16
3.	"Insecurity"	Rich West	4:20
4.	"We Connect"	Willie Wilcox	4:36
5.	"Big Electronic Beat"	St. James; John Van Tongeren	4:06
6.	"Shy Girl"	Skip Hahn; St. James; Stacey Swain	4:51
7.	"Too Hot for Love"	Carlo Zanella; Acacia Smith; Swain	4:06
8.	"Screaming In My Pillow"	St. James; Elizabeth Roberts	4:32
9.	"Synthicide"	St. James	3:29
10.	"PlayBack"	St. James	5:53
11.	"The Model"	St. James; Swain	2:28
12.	"Video Girl"	St. James	2:55
13.	"Music's Gone"	St. James	3:25
14.	"Heartless"	St. James; Swain; Zanella	4:01
Total length:			57:52

Queen of the 80's (2007)
No.	Title	Writer(s)	Length
1.	"Shy Girl"	Hahn; St. James; Swain	4:52
2.	"We Connect"	Wilcox	4:37
3.	"Insecurity"	West	4:20
4.	"Two of Hearts"	Mitchell	4:55
5.	"Love or Desire"	St. James	4:14
6.	"Synthicide"	St. James	3:29
7.	"Big Electronic Beat"	St. James; Van Tongeren	4:06
8.	"Video Girl"	St. James	2:54
9.	"PlayBack"	St. James	5:51
10.	"The Model"	St. James; Swain	2:29
11.	"Heartless"	St. James; Swain; Zanella	4:02
12.	"Too Hot for Love"	Zanella; Swain; Smith	4:06
Total length:			49:55

Credits adapted from the liner notes of Stacey Q's Greatest Hits.
