= Justin A. Nylander =

American born author and photographer

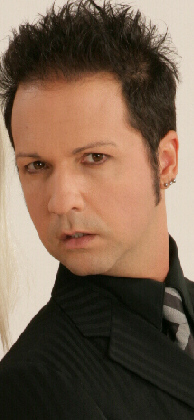
Self-portrait of Justin A. Nylander in 2013.

Justin A. Nylander is an American born author and photographer. Justin has also enjoyed a career in the music entertainment industry both behind-the-scenes and as a recording artist.

His first book, titled Casas to Castles: Florida’s Historic Mediterranean Revival Architecture (ISBN 0764334352), was published by Schiffer Books in 2010. Casas to Castles is a hard cover coffee table book featuring over forty historic homes in the Mediterranean revival style throughout Florida, including magnificent seaside palaces of the rich and famous, including Donald Trump's palatial Mar-a-Lago estate in Palm Beach. His second book titled Florida's Historic Victorian Homes (ISBN 0764343653), also published by Schiffer Books has a 2013 release. Florida's Historic Victorian Homes is a hard cover coffee table book featuring over forty historic Victorian style homes. His third book in the works will be a California-based subject to be determined. Justin appears on HGTV Network show House Hunters (Season 188 Episode 6 “Good Energy In Palm Springs”) along with his husband Michael Nylander. Their House Hunters episode first aired March 31, 2020 and can be seen in repeat format and HGTV streaming archive.

== Early life ==
Justin A. Nylander was born and raised in Southern California, growing up in the upscale Los Angeles County suburb of La Habra Heights. In the mid-1980s as a young teen he befriended pop star Stacey Q and her producer Jon St. James. At the height of Stacey Q's success with her number 1 pop/dance hit "Two Of Hearts" (Atlantic Records 1986), Justin along with his best friend Christiana Eastman, were both hired by Stacey Q as her official fan club staff. While still students in school, Justin along with Christiana would work after school in the Formula One Recording Studio owned by music producer/manager Jon St. James. Stacey Q's success continued to grow with numerous albums released throughout the 1980s-1990s and the music industry career of Justin blossomed working for Stacey Q and Jon St. James. Justin's job duties grew beyond running fan clubs for numerous recording artists. As a teen, Justin appeared in the music video for Stacey Q "Give You All My Love" (Atlantic Records 1989) and in the music video for Bardeux "Bleeding Heart" (Synthicide/Enigma Records 1988).

In the music entertainment industry Justin A. Nylander enjoyed over twenty years working steadily. His skills were displayed both behind the scenes and in the spotlight, ranging from artist management, A&R, PA, photographer, songwriter, producer, director, musician, record company executive, and recording artist.

In 1994, Justin A. Nylander along with Christiana Eastman, formed the nuwave/electronic dance pop duo Factory Of Love. Factory Of Love released product with Avex Records in Japan and MMS Records in Germany in 1994. Factory Of Love was short lived and eventually Justin along with Christiana Eastman formed the nuwave/electronic dance pop duo T.H.E.M. Thee Human Ego Maniacs, with Justin and Christiana as dual vocalists. T.H.E.M. Thee Human Ego Maniacs had a maxi-single "Voices / Here We Go / Sex Shooter " (2002) and three album releases "Sin, Win & Grin" (2002), "Bang" (2004), and "Skin" (2006). T.H.E.M. acquired numerous mentions in Billboard Magazine, global club play and hit music videos for the singles "Here We Go" (2003), "Let Me See Your Underwear" (2004), "Killer" (2006), "Beautiful" (2008). Music videos for both "Killer" and "Beautiful" were Top 10 video hits on LOGO Network. T.H.E.M. Thee Human Ego Maniacs were part of the Electroclash/

In 2002 Justin was invited by Billboard Magazine to be a panelist at The Billboard Magazine Dance Summit in NYC representing the emerging Electroclash / Nu-electro movement along with Larry Tee, Tiga, Mount Sims and more. In 2001 T.H.E.M. Thee Human Ego Maniacs were featured in Los Angeles Times with a large photo from appearing on the red carpet at that years Grammy Awards along with other artists. They received numerous brief spots on various television and media outlets from that evening on the red carpet.

== Present ==
Justin A. Nylander is currently a published author and photographer, who has published several photography books depicting historic architecture.

Born: January 7, 1969 Height: 6'2"
