= Skip Hahn =

Skip Hahn (born Gary Loren Hahn; born November 30, 1951) is an American record producer, musician, singer and songwriter. Hahn is known for work with the American band SSQ (1982–1988), on Playback; and, with SSQ backing Stacey Q on their Better Than Heaven and Hard Machine albums. On a side project during the months recording the Better Than Heaven album, Hahn collaborated with Jon St. James on James's album, Fast Impressions, writing, performing and producing. Guest artists included guitarists Allan Holdsworth; Ray Gomez; and Scott Bowers. From 2005 to 2007, Hahn and St. James worked together as a duo named Echo Junkies, releasing the art-rock album, Echo Junkies, in 2007. This time special guest artists included their SSQ bandmate/singer/songwriter, Stacey Q, Jason Freese (saxophone), Danny Mantel (not credited on the liner notes) on tabla.
