= Color Me Cinnamon =

Studio album by Stacey Q
- Released: February 14, 2010
- Recorded: 2008–09
- Studio: Casbah Recording Studio; Fullerton, California
- Genre: Synthpop; Hi-NRG; eurodance; rock
- Length: 57:25
- Label: Hydra Productions
- Producer: Jon St. James

Stacey Q chronology
Boomerang (1997)	Color Me Cinnamon (2010)	Jet Town Je t'aime (2020)

Singles from Color Me Cinnamon
- 1. "Trip" Released: August 4, 2009; 2. "Pandora's Box" Released: January 19, 2010; 3. "Going Goth" Released: October 26, 2010

Color Me Cinnamon is the fifth studio album by American singer Stacey Q, released on February 14, 2010 by Hydra Productions. It was her first release in thirteen years since her last album, Boomerang (1997). The work on the album started in 2008, after Shawn Winstian asked Jon St. James to remix a few singles for Hydra Productions’ compilation album, Liquid. An early version of the song "Trip" appeared on the compilation and Swain agreed to record a full-length album. Produced by Jon St. James, Color Me Cinnamon is a musical return to Stacey Q's synthpop and Hi-NRG roots but also features elements of techno-influenced eurodance and rock. Swain collaborated with St. James, Shawn Winstian and Shane Condo on writing the songs for the album.

The album is named after Cinnamon, a character portrayed by Stacy Q on two episodes of the NBC television series The Facts of Life. "Cinnamon was a very popular character for Stacey and a lot of fans thought it was her name", Winstian said. "After recording the song 'Cinnamon Girl' for this album, we decided to call it Color Me Cinnamon as an homage to the album her character had released on the show. For me, this is that lost album".

As of 2025, it is the most recent solo studio album released by Stacy Q, not considering her band SSQ's second album Jet Town Je t'aime (2020). Three singles from the album were released: "Trip", "Pandora's Box" and "Going Goth".

== Track listing ==
No.	Title	Writer(s)	Length
1.	"Prelude"	Stacey Swain; Jon St. James; Shawn Winstian	1:22
2.	"Trip"	St. James; Winstian; Shane Condo	3:30
3.	"Below the Surface"	Swain; St. James; Winstian	3:08
4.	"Pandora's Box"	Swain; St. James; Winstian	4:51
5.	"Masquerade"	St. James; Winstian	5:46
6.	"Candy Apple"	Swain; St. James; Winstian	3:16
7.	"Euphoria"	St. James; Winstian; Condo	5:27
8.	"Behind the Eight Ball"	Swain; St. James; Winstian	3:21
9.	"The Lion's Den"	St. James; Winstian	4:17
10.	"Going Goth"	Swain; St. James; Winstian	3:31
11.	"Voices in My Head"	St. James; Winstian; Condo	5:39
12.	"Cinnamon Girl"	Swain; St. James; Winstian	5:10
13.	"Where I Am"	Swain; St. James; Winstian	3:03
14.	"Sad Cafe"	Swain; St. James; Winstian	5:04
Total length:			57:25

== Credits and personnel ==
- Stacey Q – vocals, associate producer
- Jon St. James – producer, recording, mixing, mastering
- Shawn Winstian – executive producer, art direction, design
- Lori St. James – associate producer
- Joe Grimshaw – art direction, design

Credits adapted from the album's liner notes.
