= Stacey Q (album) =

EP by Stacey Q
- Released: 1985
- Genre: Synthpop; new wave
- Label: On the Spot
- Producer: Jon St. James

Stacey Q chronology
Playback (1983)	Stacey Q (1985)	Better Than Heaven (1986)

Stacey Q is the first extended play by American singer Stacey Q, released in 1985 by On the Spot Records. It was only released in cassette format limited to 500 copies. Produced by Jon St. James, the EP features an early version of her hit song "Two of Hearts", which would later peak at number 3 on the Billboard Hot 100 and become one of the highest-selling singles of 1986. Other songs on the EP include "Dancing Nowhere," later featured, along with the updated version of "Two of Hearts," on her debut album Better Than Heaven (1986) and "Dancing in the Dark", a cover version of Kim Wilde's song. "Shy Girl" was released as a single.

== Background and recording ==
After the release of the album Playback (1983) with the band SSQ, Swain began working with Jon St. James on her solo material. St. James brought the song "Two of Hearts" and wanted her to record it. The song was originally intended for Sue Gatlin who co-wrote it with John Mitchell and Tim Greene. At first, Swain refused to record a song written by someone else, but later she changed her mind and decided to record it. After being signed by Atlantic Records, "Two of Hearts" was included on her debut album Better Than Heaven (1986).

== Track listing ==
No.	Title	Writer(s)	Length
1.	"Shy Girl"	Skip Hahn; Jon St. James; Stacey Swain
2.	"Two of Hearts"	Sue Gatlin; Tim Greene; John Mitchell
3.	"Dancing Nowhere"	St. James; Swain
4.	"Dancing in the Dark"	Nicky Chinn; Paul Gurvitz
5.	"Hard Machine"	St. James; Swain

The cassette features the same program on each side.
