= Peace (Anything Box album) =

Studio album by Anything Box
- Released: 1990
- Recorded: 1989–1990
- Genre: Synth-pop
- Length: 53:58
- Label: Epic
- Producer: Jon St. James

Anything Box chronology
Peace (1990)	Worth (1992)

Peace is the debut album by the American band Anything Box, released in 1990 on Epic Records. It was remastered and rereleased on endpop in 2018. The album includes "Living in Oblivion", the band's biggest hit, which found success in both the clubs and on radio.

== Production ==
The album was produced by Jon St. James.

== Critical reception ==
Professional ratings
Review scores
Source	Rating
AllMusic	2.5/5 stars
Los Angeles Times	2/4 stars

The Los Angeles Times determined that "songs are put together like Lego houses, out of discreet bits of linked melodic material... But the process becomes formulaic after a while: mechanical beats overlaid with soft keyboard gauze and a puff of vocal melody."

AllMusic wrote that "the Anything Box sound can be likened to that of Erasure, with simple pop hooks, soaring vocals, and bubbly synths." Spin noted that "Living in Oblivion" "revive[d] the dread that was barely concealed in all those '70s Bee Gees disco hits."

== Track listing ==
1. "Living in Oblivion" – 5:12
2. "When We Lie" – 4:00
3. "Kiss of Love" – 4:57
4. "Jubilation" – 4:59
5. "Soul on Fire" – 4:58
6. "Our Dreams" – 5:18
7. "Carmen" – 4:55
8. "Lady in Waiting" – 5:13
9. "I Felt the Pain" – 5:32
10. "Hypocrites" – 5:27
11. "Just One Day" – 5:01
12. "All These Days Undone" – 3:24

== Personnel ==
- Claude S
- Dania Morales
- Paul Rijnders
