= Playback (SSQ album) =

Studio album by SSQ
- Released: 1983
- Recorded: 1982–1983
- Genres: Synthpop; new wave
- Length: 31:03
- Labels: Enigma; EMI America
- Producer: Jon St. James

SSQ chronology
Playback (1983)	Jet Town Je t'aime (2020)

Stacy Q chronology
Playback (1983)	Stacey Q (1985)

Singles from Playback
- 1. "Synthicide" Released: 1983; 2. "Big Electronic Beat" Released: 1983

Playback is the first studio album by the American synthpop band SSQ, released in 1983 by Enigma and EMI America Records. It was the only album released by the band as SSQ until the release of their second album Jet Town Je t'aime in 2020, though the band members later worked on lead singer Stacey Q's debut album Better Than Heaven (1986) and follow-up album, Hard Machine (1988).

== Music videos ==
Music videos were released for both "Synthicide" and "Screaming In My Pillow." There were three different videos released for "Screaming In My Pillow": The first version was a PG-13-rated version that received airplay on MTV. A more controversial, "uncensored" version was aired on Playboy TV depicting full-frontal nudity and lesbianism by Stacey Swain and an unknown model. A third video, called the NC-17 version, was considered too graphic for mainstream airplay. It was included on Red Hot Rock, a VHS compilation of uncensored music videos.

== Track listing ==
Side one
No.	Title	Writer(s)	Length
1.	"Synthicide"	Jon St. James	3:36
2.	"Jet Town"	St. James, John Van Tongeren	3:40
3.	"Big Electronic Beat"	St. James, Van Tongeren	3:30
4.	"Clockwork"	St. James	5:28

Side two
No.	Title	Writer(s)	Length
1.	"Screaming in My Pillow"	St. James, Elizabeth Roberts	4:19
2.	"Anonymous"	St. James, Van Tongeren	3:54
3.	"Walkman On"	St. James, Van Tongeren	3:40
4.	"N'Importe Quoi"	St. James, Martine Hamel	2:56
Total length:			31:03

Cassette version
No.	Title	Writer(s)	Length
5.	"Fire"	Jimi Hendrix	3:47
10.	"Synth Samurai"	St. James	4:09

2014 remastered version
No.	Title	Writer(s)	Length
1.	"Synthicide"	St. James	3:32
2.	"Jet Town"	St. James, Van Tongeren	3:40
3.	"Big Electronic Beat"	St. James, Van Tongeren	3:32
4.	"The Girl Who Seduced the World"	St. James	3:34
5.	"Screaming in My Pillow"	St. James, Roberts	4:38
6.	"The Model"	St. James	2:31
7.	"Anonymous"	St. James, Van Tongeren	3:55
8.	"Walkman On"	St. James, Van Tongeren	3:36
9.	"N'Importe Quoi"	St. James, Hamel	2:56
10.	"Playback" (Kendun Mix)	St. James	3:52
11.	"Tonight (We'll Make Love Until We Die)"	St. James, Stacey Swain	3:15
12.	"Clockwork" (Extended Mix)	St. James	5:31
13.	"Synth Samurai"	St. James	4:09
14.	"Tonight (We'll Make Love Until We Die)" (Alternate Mix)	St. James, Swain	4:02
Total length:			52:43

== Personnel ==
- Stacey Q – vocals
- Jon St. James – guitars, synthesizer, vocals
- John Van Tongeren – synthesizer
- Rich West – synthesizer
- Karl Moet – drum systems
- Skip Hahn – keyboards, vocoder

== Legacy ==
The album was re-released on July 10, 2014, by F1 Music as a digital download on the iTunes Store and Amazon. It has never been issued on a legitimate compact disc by any company. It was originally issued on vinyl and cassette only.
