= Bold as Love =

Bold as Love may refer to:

- Bold as Love (novel), a 2001 novel by Gwyneth Jones
- "Bold as Love" (song), a song by The Jimi Hendrix Experience on the 1967 album Axis: Bold as Love
- Bold as Love (album), a 1988 album by Bardeux
- Axis: Bold as Love, a 1967 album by The Jimi Hendrix Experience
