= Casbah Recording Studio =

Recording studio in the Orange County suburb of Fullerton, California, United States

Coordinates: 33.8701°N 117.9639°W

The Casbah Recording Studio or simply Casbah is a recording studio in the Orange County suburb of Fullerton, California that helped to spawn several highly successful acts, including Berlin, Stacey Q, and Social Distortion.

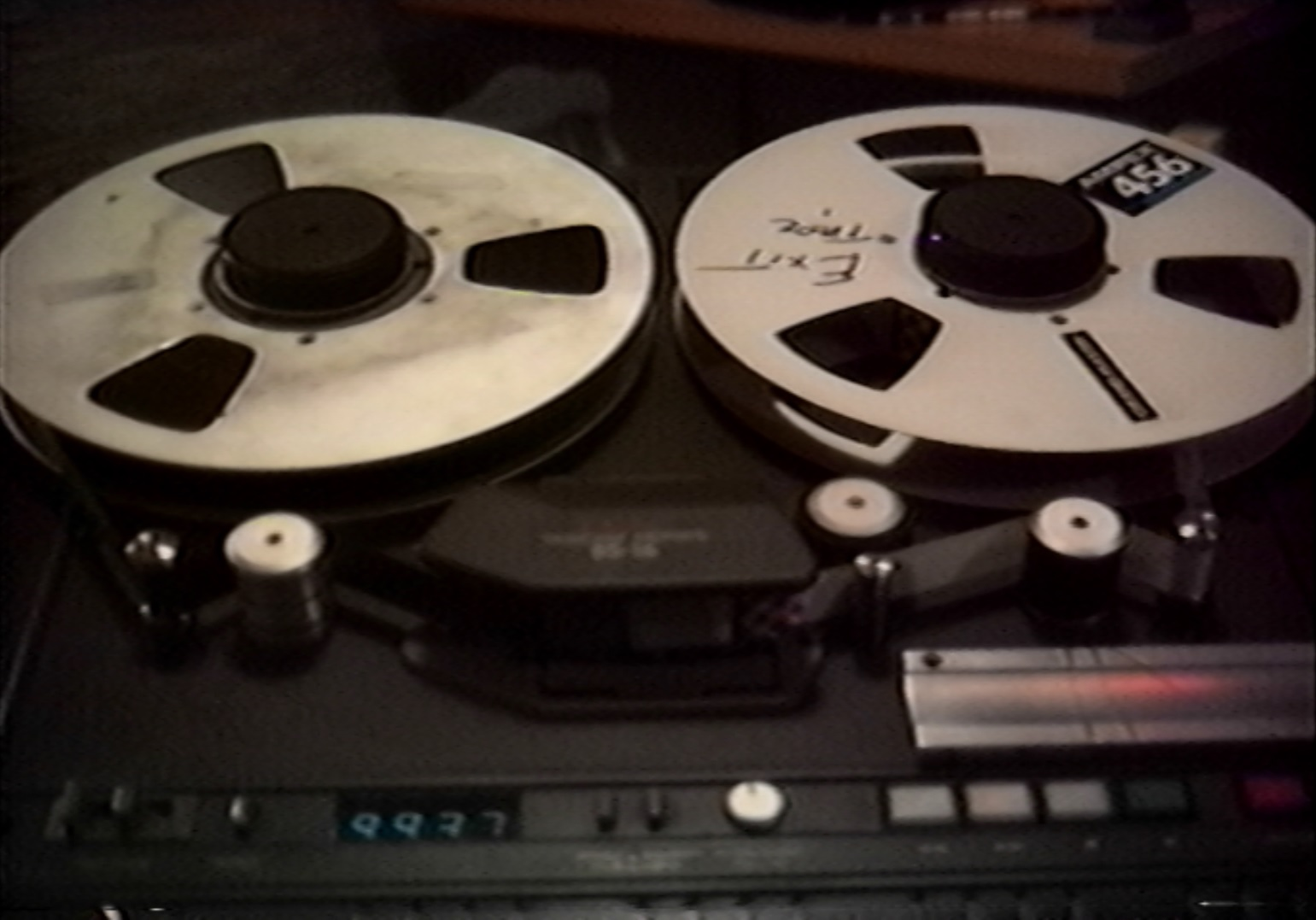
The Tascam 1" 16 track recorder at Casbah, as pictured during an EXIT recording session Feb 16, 1991.

== Founding of Casbah ==
Casbah was founded in the late 1970s by bandmates Jon St. James, and Charles "Chaz" Ramirez, with money borrowed from St. James' parents. Initially it boasted only a TEAC 8-track tape machine, a mixing console and a few effects. St. James purchased additional electronic devices and rack mount equipment using money he earned doing a series of sound-alike jingles for the now-defunct Los Angeles rock and roll station KMET 94.7 FM. In the early 1980s, the 8-track TEAC was replaced with a Tascam 16 track, which was considered the standard in many studios at the time. It was on that reel-to-reel tape machine that Stacey Q's Better Than Heaven album was recorded. The Casbah attracted a variety of talent, including Righteous Brothers keyboardist John Van Tongeren and Berlin drummer, synthesist and producer Dan Van Patten, who lent their abilities to a variety of projects. As a songwriter, guitarist, and producer, St. James helped to bring the talents of techno-pop diva Stacey Q, the dance-pop duo Bardeux, and the dance-pop artist Katalina to a wide audience.

== Punk Rock Boom ==
Casbah's role in the punk boom can be heavily attributed to St. James's partnership with Charles "Chaz" Ramirez. While St. James and Ramirez had very different styles, their partnership gave birth to classic records by iconic punk bands such as the Adolescents, Social Distortion, Agent Orange, Burning Image, The Cadillac Tramps, Mad Parade and The Vandals. "Chaz", as he was known to most, was guitarist for Eddie and the Subtitles, a local punk band that was influential on younger Fullerton punks as the Adolescents and Social Distortion, both of which recorded their early demos and singles at Casbah, and continued recording albums there as their popularity grew. “I don’t think they shared musical tastes" stated Michael Hutchinson, producer for Billy Idol and Berlin, observing "I don’t know how excited Chaz was about Berlin – he was more excited about punk stuff.” Yet there was an excitement that came from the blending of the two distinct cultures; one typified by Chaz and his cronies’ slacker ethos, the other by St. James and his commercial sensibilities and keen awareness of musical trends. After the success of Stacey Q's Better Than Heaven, St. James deferred ownership of The Casbah to Ramirez.

Ramirez and his influence played a vital role in fostering the punk rock boom that became Orange County's signature contribution to '80s music, helping Fullerton to become the epicenter for early OC punk. Under Ramirez, Casbah became known as a Mecca for the punk rock scene. “Most punk bands wanted to go there and record,” stated Hutchinson, “Mostly, I think because of the vibe, and because of Chaz. Chaz always cared that everybody got what they wanted and had a good time," added Hutchinson. Mike Ness, front-man for Social Distortion, said of Ramirez "He was a fun guy, probably one of the most well-liked guys I ever met," adding "I don't think he had an enemy in the world." Ramirez described punk rock as "the cool new folk music, the new music of the people," adding "People equate folk music with nylon string guitars, but folk music is folk music, and this is it."

Ramirez co-produced Social Distortion's first two albums, Mommy's Little Monster and Prison Bound, and continued to help the band fashion its sound in demo sessions and rehearsals at Casbah after it graduated in 1990 to Epic Records.

Ramirez was able to branch beyond punk. He engineered Berlin's hot-selling 1983 album, Pleasure Victim And he worked closely with Stryper, the metal band whose glossier sound helped it become the best-selling Orange County rock band of the '80s. "Chaz wasn't just a punk rock producer at all," Sweet said. "He 100% knew what he was doing, and he was one of the easiest guys to work with in the business," said Michael Sweet, lead singer of Stryper.

In 1998, Ramirez brought on partner Greg Heil, who engineered and produced the album "Johny Bravo" for Joyride (former members of the Adolescents), "post-punk" alternative bands such as Breakfast with Amy, Fluffy, and EXIT, and speed-metal bands such as The Crucified.

Tragically, Chaz Ramirez died on Wednesday, Dec 2, 1992, following an accidental fall, after years of shaping some of the most memorable and widely heard rock music to have come out of Orange County. He was 39 years old.

Following the passing of Ramirez, Social Distortion began leasing the space, where they continue using the studio for practicing and recording new material.

== The new Casbah ==
St. James recently opened a new Casbah recording studio in downtown Fullerton—a Pro Tools equipped digital studio offering recording, mixing, and mastering services.
