= Nylander =

Nylander is a Scandinavian surname. It may refer to:

- Alexander Nylander (born 1998), Swedish ice hockey player
- Amanda Nylander (born 1990), Swedish figure skater
- Christer Nylander (born 1968), Swedish politician
- Erik Nylander (born 1981), Swedish jazz musician and composer
- Isabelle Nylander (born 1990), Swedish figure skater
- Justin A. Nylander (born ?), US-American author, musician and photographer
- Lennart Nylander (1901–1966), Swedish diplomat
- Michael Nylander (born 1972), Swedish ice hockey player
- Peter Nylander (born 1976), Swedish ice hockey player
- Sven Nylander (born 1962), Swedish Olympic hurdler
- Terry Nylander (born 1946), Canadian politician
- William Nylander (botanist) (1822–1899), Finnish botanist and entomologist
- William Nylander (ice hockey) (born 1996), Swedish ice hockey player

== See also ==
- Gustavus Reinhold Nyländer, (1776-1825) missionary
- Nylander's test, a chemical test
