= Living in Oblivion (song) =

Single by Anything Box

from the album Peace
- B-side: "Time to Go"/"Living in Oblivion (Slow Mix)" (1988 release) "Living in Oblivion" remixes (1990 release)
- Released: 1988 / 1990
- Genre: Synth-pop
- Length: 4:30
- Label: Epic
- Songwriter: Claude S.
- Producer: Jon St. James

Anything Box singles chronology
"Beat of Life / I Know What You Want" (1988)	"Living in Oblivion" (1988)	"Jubilation (This Thing Called Life)" (1990)

"Living in Oblivion" is a song by American synthpop band Anything Box. It was initially self-released by the band as a 12" single in 1988, with "Time to Go" and "Living in Oblivion (Slow Mix)" on its B-side. It was released again in 1990 as their first major label single, on Epic Records. The song is from their debut album Peace. It was the band's first chart hit, and only single to appear on the Billboard Hot 100, where it reached No. 65. On the Billboard Dance Club Songs chart, the song peaked at No. 10.

A new version titled "Living in Oblivion (MCMXCVI A.D.)" was released in 1996 on their label Orangewerks which contained additional remixes by Digital 3, Paul Robb, Rythmus and Seven Red Seven.

== Charts ==
Chart (1990)	Peak position
US Billboard Hot 100	65
US Dance Club Songs (Billboard)	10
US Cash Box Top 100	65
