= Don't Make a Fool of Yourself =

- Standard U.S release artwork

Single by Stacey Q

from the album Hard Machine
- Released: March 25, 1988
- Genre: Dance-pop
- Length: 7:05 (The Shep Pettibone Mix); 3:58 (Shep Pettibone radio edit)
- Label: Atlantic (US DMD-1136)
- Songwriter(s): Jon St. James, Skip Hahn, Stacey Swain
- Producer(s): Jon St. James

Stacey Q singles chronology
"I Love You" (1988)	"Don't Make a Fool of Yourself" (1988)	"Give You All My Love" (1989)

"Don't Make a Fool of Yourself" is a song by American recording artist Stacey Q. It was taken from her second studio album, Hard Machine (1988). The song was written by Stacey Swain, Jon St. James and Skip Hahn and was produced by Jon St. James. The song was mixed by musician Shep Pettibone, who collaborated with artists like Madonna, Pet Shop Boys, Janet Jackson and others. It was released as the album's first single on March 25, 1988 by Atlantic Records. The song peaked at #66 on the Billboard Hot 100 chart and #4 on the Billboard Dance Club Songs chart. The remix of the song topped one week on the Billboard Hot Dance Music/Maxi-Singles Sales chart. The song was also featured in an episode on the 80s hit tv show Full House called "D.J. Tanner's Day Off"

== Composition ==
The song is set in common time and has a moderate tempo of 115 beats per minute.

== Track listing ==
- Promotional 12" single
1. "Don't Make a Fool of Yourself" (The Shep Pettibone Mix) – 7:05
2. "Don't Make a Fool of Yourself" (Shep Pettibone Radio Edit) – 4:00
3. "Don't Make a Fool of Yourself" (Try It Out Lover Mix) – 7:47
4. "Don't Make a Fool of Yourself" (Pumpin Mix) – 4:25
- Cassette single
1. "Don't Make a Fool of Yourself" (The Shep Pettibone Mix) – -:--
2. "Fly By Night" – -:--
3. "Don't Make a Fool of Yourself" (The Shep Pettibone Mix) – -:--
4. "Fly By Night" – -:--

== Personnel ==
- Skip Hahn, Stacey Q – Backing vocalist
- Jon St. James, Karl Moet – drums
- Karl Moet – sampler
- Skip Hahn – guitar
- Jon St. James, Rich West, Skip Hahn – keyboards
- percussion – Jon St. James, Karl Moet
- Shep Pettibone – mixing
- Shep Pettibone, Tuta Aquino – editing
- Steve Peck – mix engineer
- St. James, Hahn, Swain – songwriters
- Jon St. James – producer

== Chart positions ==
Chart (1988)	Peak position
Australia (Kent Music Report)	73
U.S. Billboard Hot 100	66
U.S. Billboard Hot Dance Club Play	4
U.S. Billboard Hot Dance Music/Maxi-Singles Sales	1
