= Bold as Love (album) =

Studio album by Bardeux
- Released: 1988
- Recorded: 1987–1988
- Genre: Dance, disco
- Label: Synthicide, Enigma
- Producer: Jon St. James & Karl Moet; associate producers: Frank Del Rio and Rocky Petralia

Bardeux chronology
Bold as Love (1988)	Shangri-La (1989)

Professional ratings
Review scores
Source	Rating
The Philadelphia Inquirer	2/4 stars

Bold as Love is the debut album by Bardeux. During their short run as a group, Bardeux spun off both mainstream and dance hits. Their first single "Magic Carpet Ride" peaked at number No. 81 on the Billboard Hot 100 chart. Their third single and most notable song of their career was "When We Kiss," which peaked at No. 36 on the Hot 100. Their last single, "Hold Me, Hold Me", didn't chart. The album peaked at No. 104 on the Billboard 200. It is the only album on which Lisa "Jaz" Teaney appeared.

== Track listing ==
1. "Magic Carpet Ride" (Acacia Smith, Jon St. James) 3:23
2. "Three Time Lover" (St. James) 3:30
3. "Caution" (Kim Allen Larson) 3:38
4. "Bleeding Heart" (Karl Moet, Smith) 3:55
5. "You're My Only Kind of Lover" (Michael Stein) 3:46
6. "Hold Me, Hold Me" (Kirk Fisher, Stein) 4:45
7. "Dancing in the Wind" (Denise Batien, Gina Quartaro, Lisa Teaney, Moet) 4:31
8. "Sex Machine" (Smith, St. James) 5:21
9. "When We Kiss" (Smith, St. James) 4:52

== Charts ==
Album	Chart	Peak position
Bold as Love	Billboard 200	104
Single	Chart	Peak position
"Three Time Lover"	Billboard Hot Dance	10
"Magic Carpet Ride"	Billboard Hot 100	81
"When We Kiss"	Billboard Hot 100	36
