= Plan 9 (band) =

American neo-psychedelic band

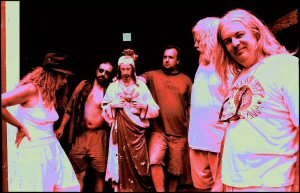
Plan 9 from Rhode Island

Plan 9 is an American neo-psychedelic band from Rhode Island formed in 1979.

The group was named for the 1950s science fiction film Plan 9 from Outer Space.

The Calgary Herald wrote, in 1989, "Its music has that spirited, no-holds-barred feel of rock from the '60s while managing to not sound dated."

The band was inducted into the Rhode Island Music Hall of Fame in 2017, alongside Throwing Muses and several other acts.

== Members ==
- Eric Stumpo
- Debora D
- John DeVault
- Albertron
- Harry Keithline
- Mike Meehan (1979–1984)
- Tom Champlin
- Alex Nagle
- Evan Williams
- John Florence
- Frank Villani
- Brian Thomas (1985)
- Brent Hosier (1985–86)
- Evan Laboissionniere
- Steve Anderson
- Norman Wrigley

== Discography ==
=== Singles ===
- I Can't Stand This Love, Goodbye
- 5 Years Ahead of My Time
- Brian T & Plan 9 EP
- Around the USA
- Merry Christmas

=== Albums ===
- Frustration EP (Voxx, 1981)
- Dealing with the Dead (Midnight, 1983)
- Plan 9 (New Rose, 1984)
- It's a Live/I Just Killed a Man and I Don't Want to See Any Meat... (Midnight, 1985)
- Keep Your Cool and Read the Rules (Pink Dust/Enigma 1986)
- Anytime Anyplace Anywhere (Restless/Enigma, 1986)
- Sea Hunt (Enigma, 1987)
- Ham & Sam Jammin' (Restless, 1989)
- Stock Footage (WorryBird, 1994)
- Pleasure Farm (J-Bird, 1998)
- Cow Town (Criswell Predicts, 2001)
- The Gathering (Criswell Predicts, 2001)
- 9 Men's Misery (Criswell Predicts, 2001)
- Sour Tongue Readings (Criswell Predicts, 2002)
- Things I Do (Criswell Predicts, 2008)

=== Compilation appearances ===
- "I Like Girls" from Le Vie En Rose (New Rose Records, 1985)
- "Man Bites Dog" and "Ship of Fools" from The Enigma Variations 2 (Enigma Records, 1987)
- "Try to Run" from Rock'n'Rose (New Rose Records, 1990)
