= Synthicide =

Single by SSQ

from the album Playback
- B-side: "Fire"
- Released: 1983
- Genre: New wave
- Length: 3:38
- Songwriter(s): Jon St. James

"Synthicide" is a song performed by the short lived American synthpop group SSQ, from their only studio album Playback. The song reached #47 on the U.S. Dance chart.
