= Nights Like This (album) =

Studio album by Stacey Q
- Released: June 8, 1989
- Recorded: 1989
- Genres: Dance-pop; freestyle; house
- Length: 49:45
- Label: Atlantic
- Producers: Jon St. James; Clivillés & Cole; Robert Gordon; Bruce Gaitsch

Stacey Q chronology
Hard Machine (1988)	Nights Like This (1989)	Stacey Q's Greatest Hits (1995)

Singles from Nights Like This
- 1. "Give You All My Love" Released: May 25, 1989; 2. "Heartbeat" Released: 1989

Nights Like This is the third studio album by American singer Stacey Q, released on June 8, 1989 by Atlantic Records. It was her last album to be released on the Atlantic label before she went on a hiatus from making music until the release of her album Boomerang (1997). After the moderate commercial success of her album Hard Machine (1988), Swain decided to pursue a new musical direction. She again worked with Jon St. James but also invited other producers, such as Clivillés & Cole, Robert Gordon or Bruce Gaitsch, to achieve a different sound. Nights Like This is predominantly influenced by freestyle and house music, making it a musical departure from her previous work. The album is, like her album Hard Machine, dedicated to her friend and hair stylist, Danny Medellin, who died in 1988.

Upon its release, Nights Like This received generally positive reviews from music critics, but was a commercial failure. It became her first album not to reach the Billboard 200.

Two singles were released from the album. The lead single, "Give You All My Love", peaked at number sixteen on the Billboard Hot Dance Club Songs and number eight on the Singles Sales chart. Accompanying music videos were released for both, the album version and the Crossover House Mix of the song. "Heartbeat" was released as the second single and it became a minor adult contemporary format radio hit.

== Singles ==
"Give You All My Love" was released as the lead single from the album on May 25, 1989. The music video was shot in Los Angeles, California. It features Swain dancing with her friends inside a loft apartment. One of the dancers is Michael Chambers.

== Critical reception ==
Professional ratings
Review scores
Source	Rating
AllMusic	2.5/5 stars

Upon its release, Nights Like This received generally positive reviews from music critics, mostly praising its dance club sound. Justin Kantor at AllMusic gave it two and a half star out of five, calling the songs on the album "more trend-setting than trend-conscious" and recommending it to "club-goers looking for a rhythmically consistent album with just a touch of a pop sensibility."

== Track listing ==
No.	Title	Writer(s)	Producer(s)	Length
1.	"Give You All My Love"	Stacey Swain; David Cole	Clivillés & Cole	4:23
2.	"Nights Like This"	Swain; Mark Gamble; Ruth Joy	Robert Gordon	4:44
3.	"Heartbeat"	Bruce Gaitsch	Gaitsch	4:43
4.	"Incognito"	Swain; Jon St. James	St. James	5:21
5.	"Take That Holiday"	Michael Eckart	St. James	5:10
6.	"You Wrote the Book"	Ken Kessie; Morey Goldstein; Katie Guthorn	Clivillés & Cole	5:09
7.	"Love Philosophy"	Swain; St. James; Gamble; Joy	Gordon	4:44
8.	"Goin' Out"	Swain; St. James; Eckart	St. James	5:39
9.	"Too Good to Me"	Swain; St. James; Eckart	St. James	5:50
10.	"The Edge of Love"	Swain; St. James; Eckart	St. James	4:02
Total length:				49:45

== Credits and personnel ==
- Stacey Swain – lead and backing vocals
- Roger Behle, Jr. – guitars
- Robert Clivillés – producer
- David Cole – producer
- Michael Eckhart – producer, keyboards, programming, backing vocals
- Bruce Gaitsch – producer, guitars, keyboards, engineer
- Mark Gamble – producer
- Sam Lister
- Jon St. James – producer, backing vocals
- David Williams – producer
- Jocelyn Brown – backing vocals
- David Cordrey – backing vocals
- Craig Derry – backing vocals
- Ruth Joy – backing vocals
- Ed Reddick – backing vocals
- Timothy B. Schmit – backing vocals
- Martha Wash – backing vocals
- Ken Komisar – executive producer
- Charlie Watts – engineer
- Steve "Griss" Grissen – engineer
- Bruce Miller – engineer
- Jim "Bonzai" Lyon – engineer
- Ron Gordon – engineer
- Bob Defrin – art direction
- Anthony Ranieri – design
- Jeff Katz – photography
- Yettie – make-up

Credits adapted from the album's liner notes.

== Chart performance ==
=== Singles ===
Year	Title	Chart	Position
1989	"Give You All My Love"	Billboard Hot Dance Club Songs	16
1989	"Give You All My Love"	Billboard Maxi-Singles Sales	8
