= List of Stratos 4 characters =

This is the list of characters in the anime series Stratos 4.

== Main characters ==
Main characters

=== Shimoji airbase ===
Mikaze Honjou (本庄 美風, Honjō Mikaze)
Voiced by: Yumi Kakazu (Japanese); Rachel Kempel (English)
A candidate pilot. The 16-year-old main protagonist. Despite coming from an elite class pilot family, Mikaze initially had no interest in becoming a pilot and was an underachiever and a slacker. However, she learns later the importance of piloting.
Shizuha Doi (土井 静羽, Doi Shizuha)
Voiced by: Kaori Shimizu (Japanese); Lisa Enochs (English)
A candidate pilot and also the daughter of a photographer. Studious and ambitious, Shizuha is the yes-woman of the group. Like Mikaze, she is also 16 years old.

Ayamo Nakamura (中村 彩雲, Nakamura Ayamo)
Voiced by: Shiho Kikuchi (Mie Sonozaki in Stratos 4 Advance Kanketsuhen) (Japanese), Elisa Fiorillo (English)
A candidate pilot and also the daughter of a politician. Ayamo is fiery and hot-headed and eager to become a Comet Blaster and is fed up with Mikaze's laziness. She is 17 years old making her the oldest.
Karin Kikuhara (菊原 香鈴, Kikuhara Karin)
Voiced by: Fumiko Orikasa (Japanese); Stacey Q (English)
A candidate pilot. Karin is a quiet girl who seems to be distracted from reality and likes to text-message her cell phone. She is afraid of cats in general and is 15 years old making her the youngest.
Sayaka Kisaragi (如月 沙弥華, Kisaragi Sayaka)
Voiced by: Sayaka Ohara (Japanese); Michael-Ann Rowe (English)
The sub-commander and instructor. She is in her mid-twenties.
Kazuma Iwasaki (岩崎 和馬, Iwasaki Kazuma)
Voiced by: Kouji Tsujitani (Japanese); Greg Lastrapes (English)
An official pilot and instructor. He is in his mid-twenties.
Kouichiro Sako (佐古 浩一郎, Sako Kōichirō)
Voiced by: Mitsuo Iwata (Japanese); Milton Lawrence (English)
Chief mechanic. He is married to Miharu, but has been separated from her for various years when the series starts. He is 36 years old.
Robert Reynolds (ロバート・レイノルズ, Robēto Reinoruzu)
Voiced by: Yousuke Akimoto (Japanese); Lou Savage (English)
He is the commander of the Shimoji base, he is of British nationality and is 63 years old.

== Secondary characters ==
Secondary characters

=== Shimoji airbase ===
Kei Fujitani (藤谷 圭, Fujitani Kei)
Voiced by: Tomokazu Seki (Japanese); Thomas Scofield (English)
An official pilot and instructor. He is in his mid-twenties.
Tsubasa Miyazawa (宮沢 翼, Miyazawa Tsubasa)
Voiced by: Hideki Tasaka (Japanese); Devin Kamin (English)
A candidate pilot. He is 17 years old.
Sora Ikeda (池田 空, Ikeda Sora)
Voiced by: Hiroyuki Yoshino (Japanese); Chris Ogden (English)
A candidate pilot. He is 16 years old.
Touko Mukai (向日 塔子, Mukai Tōko)
Voiced by: Misa Kimura (Japanese); Alla Kardot (English)
Air traffic controller

=== Kouchin Restaurant ===
Rin Mikuriya (御厨 リン, Mikuriya Rin)
Voiced by: Hisako Kyouda (Japanese); Debbie Grattan (English)
Elderly Kouchin restaurant chef, and former expert pilot (as revealed in later episodes).
Ran Mikuriya (御厨 ラン, Mikuriya Ran)
Voiced by: Michiko Neya (Japanese); Carrie Gordon (English)
Kouchin restaurant waitress. She is 22 years old.
Alice "Admiral" (御厨 アリス (テイトク), Mikuriya Arisu (Teitoku))
Voiced by: Mayumi Asano
An old female cat of 18 years old.

=== Orbital Station #7 ===
Miharu Ohzora (宙 美春, Ōzora Miharu)
Voiced by: Yōko Sōmi (Japanese); Leisa Jo Waller (English)
Commander of Orbital Station #7. She is 28 years old.
Chizuru Kubo (久保 千鶴, Kubo Chizuru)
Voiced by: Akiko Hiramatsu (Japanese); Sara Sido (English)
Member of Comet Blasters
Annette Kerry (アネット・ケイリー, Anetto Keirī)
Voiced by: Megumi Toyoguchi (Japanese); Laurel Hatfield (English)
Member of Comet Blasters
Betty Boozeman (ベティ・ブーゼマン, Beti Būzeman)
Voiced by: Satsuki Yukino (Japanese); Alla Kardot (English)
Member of Comet Blasters
Chris Calman (クリス・カルマン, Kurisu Karuman)
Voiced by: Yuu Asakawa (Japanese); Melissa Saltzman (English)
Member of Comet Blasters

=== Stratos 4: Advance ===
Mirei Tachibana (立花 美麗, Tachibana Mirei)
Voiced by: Akeno Watanabe
Mana Ninomiya (二宮 磨奈, Ninomiya Mana)
Voiced by: Haruhi Terada
Kiriko Aoki (青木 霧子, Aoki Kiriko)
Voiced by: Kaori Mizuhashi
