= Simon Says (The Outer Limits) =

- The Outer Limits episode
- Episode no.: Season 6 Episode 8
- Directed by: Helen Shaver
- Written by: Scott Peters
- Original air date: 10 March 2000

Guest appearances
- Joel Grey; Tammy Pentecost; Riley DeMeyer; Cathy Weseluck; Mikela J. Mikael; Hiro Kanagawa; Rice Honeywell

Episode chronology
← Previous "Seeds of Destruction"	Next → "Stasis"

"Simon Says" is an episode from the sixth season of The Outer Limits. It originally aired on 10 March 2000. Writer Scott Peters has been awarded in 2001 by WGC Award (Writers Guild of Canada) for the episode. John Van Tongeren won in 2001 the Gemini Awards in «Best Original Music Score for a Dramatic Series» nomination for this episode.

== Plot ==
Gideon Banks, an electronic engineer, twenty years ago lost his wife Liz and son Simon in a horrific car crash. At that period of time he was working at the so-called Neural Archiving Project — NAP for short. This technology was developed to create smart computers by transferring human engrams into computers.

The company eventually gave up on the technology, but Gideon didn't. After years of quietly perfecting it, he built at home a small robot, using parts he stole from Concorde Robotics, where he now works. Zoe, Gideon's niece, discovers Gideon's secret, that the robot contains actual neural engrams from Gideon's dead son Simon, which Gideon has integrated into the robot in hopes of re-creating his son. And now, the robot actually has memories of the real Simon.

Zoe becomes worried not only about Gideon but also about the robot that sounds and acts a lot like her little cousin used to. And she begins to realize that Simon may not have been the lovable little angel that everyone believed he was.

"Simon" becomes more and more demanding, putting pressure on Gideon, who could lose his job. When he asks Zoe to "babysit," the robot attacks during a tantrum and injures her. When Gideon returns they argue about "Simon" being a robot or as Gideon insists, a true boy. Zoe leaves upset. Later, Gideon apologizes over the phone and asks her to look after Simon again as he has to work. Zoe does so, but this time gets along much better with "Simon" who also apologizes for hurting her.

Gideon's boss finds out about the robot, and claims that since it was built from company equipment, it belongs to the company. When he tries to forcibly take "Simon" away, Gideon becomes enraged and clubs the man on the head, killing him. Gideon and Zoe begin to argue, but "Simon", who becomes distraught at recognizing the seriousness of the situation, shouts for them to stop and claims that he is ultimately the one at fault. Upset, "Simon" confesses that "he" was responsible for the car crash: when Liz refused to take Simon to the toy store, Simon threw a temper tantrum and grabbed the steering wheel, causing the fatal crash. To him, that unwise tantrum was the first domino to start the chain reaction that has now led to this moment.

Realizing what he's done could seriously impact Zoe, Gideon ushers her out, assuring her that he'll remedy the situation and do the right thing without affecting her. Soon afterwards, Zoe hears a gunshot and rushes back in, only to discover that Gideon has copied his own mind into another robot before committing suicide. Zoe can only look on in horrified silence as the two robots chat like father and son.
