= Tom Peterson and Another Language =

Studio album / Mini-LP by Tom Peterson and Another Language
- Released: 1984
- Recorded: 1983–1984
- Studio: Artisan Sound Recorders and Kendun Recorders
- Genre: New wave, power pop
- Length: 24:24
- Label: Enigma Records
- Producer: Tom Peterson; assisted by Jeffers M. Dodge

Tom Peterson and Another Language is the debut and only (mini)-album from American musician and former Cheap Trick bassist Tom Peterson, released in 1984 under his group name Tom Peterson and Another Language.

== Background ==
Petersson formed Another Language after departing Cheap Trick after the recording of their fifth studio album All Shook Up in 1980. Together with his then-wife Dagmar, a Swedish-born European model, Petersson began recording demos in the studio, which in turn led to the creation of the Another Language group. Petersson told Billboard in 1984: "The idea I had was to have a hard rock band with a fairly traditional setup, with a very light-sounding, sexy girl vocalist. At the time, groups like Missing Persons weren't around, and people thought I was nuts."

With his wife on lead vocals, Petersson recruited session guitarist Jeffrey Rollings and drummer Thom Mooney for his new group in 1981. Due to on-going legal issues after leaving Cheap Trick, Petersson's plans for recording new material was postponed. He recalled to Billboard: "It was difficult getting into the studio to record, because all I was doing was going back and forth to a lawyer all day long."

The band's mini-album Tom Peterson and Another Language surfaced in 1984, (Petersson dropping the extra pseudo-Swedish 's' from his name), and the group then toured the North American club scene. Described by AllMusic as "new wave wildness", the album was not a commercial success and Peterson then moved to New York and began playing shows with his band Sick Man of Europe, before joining Cheap Trick again in 1987.

Tom Peterson and Another Language features six songs, all of which were written by Tom and Dagmar Petersson, except "Rainy Day", which was written by the Peterssons, Nicole Hanson and Michael Conoscenti. The majority of the lead vocals were performed by Dagmar, although Petersson made an occasional vocal appearance, namely on "My Car". Petersson produced and arranged the record himself, and also played piano, as well as 12 and 18-string bass. The album was recorded at Artisan Sound & Kendun Recorders and released by the California indie label Enigma Records.

An official music video of the band performing "Lose Your Mind" was released to promote the EP during 1984. At the beginning of the video, Dagmar revealed: "I was a model for two years, I was very successful at it, but it didn't fulfill me. They just altered you to the product. I met Tom a little bit over five years ago. Tom had Cheap Trick, and we decided to start to work together, and today we have our band."

== Critical reception ==
Upon its release, Len Righi of The Morning Call wrote, "Dagmar's Swedish accent and little girl voice are all over this record (unfortunately), and when she and Tom aren't being insufferable cute ('Rainy Day,' 'All I Need'), they're being ponderous ('Living in Another World'). The other two power pop tracks, 'Lose Your Mind' and 'My Car,' are barely passable. Don't these rock stars ever learn? Does John & Yoko ring a bell? How about Paul & Linda?" Ian Russell of the Scottish paper The Kilmarnock Standard concluded the release was "far from excellent", but added "it's an encouraging return [for Peterson], with a few high spots".

== Track listing ==
No.	Title	Writer(s)	Length
1.	"Lose Your Mind"	Tom Petersson, Dagmar Petersson	4:24
2.	"All I Need"	T. Petersson, D. Petersson	3:11
3.	"My Car"	T. Petersson, D. Petersson	4:48
4.	"My Car (Reprise)"	T. Petersson, D. Petersson	3:15
5.	"Living in Another World"	T. Petersson, D. Petersson	5:23
6.	"Rainy Day"	T. Petersson, D. Petersson, Nicole Hanson, Michael Conoscenti	3:22

== Personnel ==
- Tom Petersson - 12 & 18 string bass, piano, vocals, producer, arranger
- Dagmar Petersson - vocals
- Jeffrey Rollings - guitar
- Thom Mooney, Lee Kix, Brian Irving - drums
- Joachim Kuhn - solo on "Rainy Day"

Production

- Jeffers M. Dodge - engineer, mixer, production assistance
- Tim Dennon - assistant engineer

Other

- Moshe Brakha - photography
- Brian Ayuso - design
- Gary Allen - make-up and clothing
- September - hair
- Keith Heavenridge - management
