= We Connect =

Single by Stacey Q

from the album Better Than Heaven
- B-side: "Don't Break My Heart"
- Released: November 28, 1986
- Recorded: 1985
- Genre: Dance-pop; Hi-NRG
- Length: 4:14
- Label: Atlantic
- Songwriter: Willie Wilcox
- Producers: Jon St. James; Willie Wilcox

Stacey Q singles chronology
"Two of Hearts" (1986)	"We Connect" (1986)	"Insecurity" (1987)

"We Connect" is a song recorded by American singer Stacey Q for her debut studio album Better Than Heaven (1986). The song was released as the album's second single on November 28, 1986 by Atlantic Records. Written by Willie Wilcox and produced by Jon St. James and Wilcox, the song was the follow-up to her hit single "Two of Hearts".

== Track listing and formats ==
US 7-inch vinyl single

1. "We Connect" (Dance Radio Edit) – 3:42
2. "Don't Break My Heart" (LP Version) – 3:33

US 12-inch vinyl single

1. "We Connect" (European Mix) – 7:30
2. "We Connect" (Dance Radio Edit) – 5:05
3. "We Connect" (Instrumental/Safari Mix) – 5:25

== Credits and personnel ==
- Stacey Q – vocals
- Jon St. James – producer, keyboards
- Willie Wilcox – songwriter, producer, programming
- SSQ – music
- Skip Hahn – keyboards
- Karl Moet – drums, programming
- Rich West – keyboards
- Rusty Anderson – guitars
- Aaron Rapoport – photography

Credits adapted from the single's liner notes.

== Charts ==
"We Connect" matched its predecessor's top position on the US Dance/Electronic Singles Sales chart but was less successful in pop charts, peaking at number 35 on the Billboard Hot 100 and number 14 on the Dance Club Songs. "We Connect" was released as a single in several territories where "Two of Hearts" had been a hit with impact evident only in Australia, where "We Connect" matched the number seven peak of "Two of Hearts".

=== Weekly charts ===
Chart (1987)	Position
Australia (Kent Music Report)	7
Germany (GfK)	32
US Billboard Hot 100	35
US Dance Club Songs (Billboard)	14
US Dance/Electronic Singles Sales (Billboard)	1

=== Year-end charts ===
Chart (1987)	Position
Australia (Kent Music Report)	46

== Popular culture ==
- "We Connect" was promoted on the TV series The Facts of Life in the episode "A Star is Torn", in which Stacey Q portrayed the role of Cinnamon.
