= Hard Machine =

Studio album by Stacey Q
- Released: February 1988
- Recorded: 1985–88
- Studio: F1 Studios, La Habra, California; Atlantic Studios, New York
- Genre: Dance-pop; Hi-NRG; new wave; R&B
- Length: 40:31
- Label: Atlantic
- Producer: Jon St. James

Stacey Q chronology
Better Than Heaven (1986)	Hard Machine (1988)	Nights Like This (1989)

Singles from Hard Machine
- 1. "I Love You" Released: 1988; 2. "Don't Make a Fool of Yourself" Released: March 25, 1988; 3. "Favorite Things" Released: 1988

Professional ratings
Review scores
Source	Rating
AllMusic	4/5 stars

Hard Machine is the second studio album by American singer Stacey Q, released in February 1988 by Atlantic Records. After the international success of her song "Two of Hearts" and debut album Better Than Heaven (1986), Swain began working on her sophomore record. She again collaborated with her bandmates from SSQ. Produced by Jon St. James, Hard Machine is a dance-pop album, which is influenced by new wave, contemporary R&B and rock music.

Upon its release, Hard Machine received generally positive reviews from music critics and noted a small commercial success, peaking at number 115 on the Billboard 200.

Three singles were released from the album. The lead single, "Don't Make a Fool of Yourself" (Shep Pettibone Remix), released on March 25, 1988, peaked at number 19 on the Hot Crossover 30, Number 4 on the Billboard Hot Dance Club Songs, Number 1 on the Top 12 inch Singles Sales chart, and also peaking at number 66 on the Billboard Hot 100. The second single "I Love You" peaked at Number 49 on the Billboard Hot Dance Club Songs. "Favorite Things" was released as a promotional single.

== Track listing ==
1. "Good Girl" (K. Fisher, M. Stein) (4:02)
2. "Favorite Things" (J. St. James, S. Swain) (4:10)
3. "Kiss It All Goodbye" (J. St. James, S. Swain) (3:47)
4. "Don't Make A Fool Of Yourself" (S. Hahn, J, St. James, S. Swain) (4:08)
5. "The River" (J. St. James, S. Swain) (5:06)
6. "I Love You" (J. St. James, S. Swain) (4:35)
7. "Temptation" (K. Fisher, M. Stein) (3:51)
8. "Hard Machine" (J. St. James, S. Swain) (3:16)
9. "After Hours" (J. St. James, S. Swain) (3:26)
10. "Another Chance" (S. Hahn, S. Swain) (4:05)

== Credits and personnel ==
=== SSQ ===
- Stacey Q. - lead vocals, backing vocals
- Skip Hahn - keyboards, guitar, backing vocals
- Karl Moet - drums, sampling, percussion
- Rich West - keyboards, arrangement on track 10
- Jon St. James - keyboards, drums, percussion

=== Additional musicians ===
- Scott Bowers - guitar (tracks 1, 7)
- Eddie Reddick - vocals (tracks 1, 7)
- Rusty Anderson - guitar (track 8)
- Joe Cristina - Formula 1 horns
- John Deemer - Formula 1 horns
- Victor Cajiao - Formula 1 horns
- Michael Stein - additional keyboards
- Kirk Fisher - additional keyboards

=== Production ===
- Tony Mandich - creative consultant
- Anthony Sanfilippo - creative consultant
- Keith Zajic - creative consultant
- Keith Cowen - creative consultant
- Paul Cooper - production coordinator
- Larry Yasgar - production coordinator
- Karl Moet - assistant engineer
- Jimi Yamagishi - assistant engineer
- Digital Magnetics/Ted Hall - digital mastering
- Danny Mendellin - hair
- La Lotte - make-up
- Mike Jones - photography
- Dennis King - mastering
