= Give You All My Love =

Single by Stacey Q

from the album Nights Like This
- B-side: "Out of My Heart"
- Released: May 25, 1989
- Recorded: 1989; Quad Recording Studios; New York City, New York
- Genre: Dance-pop; house
- Length: 4:28
- Label: Atlantic
- Songwriters: David Cole; Stacey Swain
- Producers: David Cole; Robert Clivillés

Stacey Q singles chronology
"I Love You" (1988)	"Give You All My Love" (1989)	"Heartbeat" (1989)

"Give You All My Love" is a song by American singer Stacey Q. It was released on May 25, 1989 as the lead single from her third studio album, Nights Like This, in 1989 by Atlantic Records. Written by Stacey Swain and David Cole and produced by Cole and Robert Clivillés, "Give You All My Love" is primarily a dance-pop song. Two versions of the song were released, the album version that appears on Nights Like This and the Crossover house mix.

The song noted a small commercial success, peaking at number sixteen on the Billboard Hot Dance Club Songs chart.

== Track listings ==
US 7" vinyl

1. "Give You All My Love" – 4:28
2. "Out of My Heart" – 3:49

US 12" vinyl

1. "Give You All My Love" (Crossover House Mix) – 5:47
2. "Give You All My Love" (Crossover Club Mix) – 4:33
3. "Give You All My Love" (Underground Mix) – 4:41
4. "Give You All My Love" (Radio Edit) – 3:32

== Credits and personnel ==
- Stacey Q – vocals, songwriter
- David Cole – songwriter, producer, mixing, arrangement
- Robert Clivillés – producer, mixing, arrangement
- Ken Komisar – executive producer
- Jocelyn Brown – background vocals
- Martha Wash – background vocals
- Craig Derry – background vocals
- Steve Griffin – engineer
- Bruce Miller – engineer
