= Anything Box =

American electronic/synth-pop band

- Origin: Buenos Aires, Argentina; Paterson, New Jersey; Orange County, California
- Genres: Synth-pop, electronic pop
- Years active: 1986–present
- Labels: Endpop.com; Presswerk.13; Jarrett Records; Orangewerks; Epic; Other Voices
- Members: Claude Strilio
- Past members: Dania Morales; Paul Rijnders; Gary Strilio; Dave South; Mike Zacek; Barry Bunch
- Website: Anything Box official website

Anything Box is an electronic/synth-pop musical group originally from Paterson, New Jersey, and now based in Long Beach, California. Formed in 1986, they are best known for their 1989 single "Living in Oblivion". They also garnered some attention for releasing an album entirely in MP3 format in 2003. With a current lineup consisting solely of Claude Strilio, the past lineups have included long-time members Dania Morales and Paul Rijnders, as well as Carlos Pacheco, Mike Zacek, Gary Strilio, Dave South and Barry Bunch.

The band is noted for its melodic, synth-driven dance beats from its early years as well as its fusion of electronics and guitars which is its current musical focus. The band also receives praise for its album artwork which ranges from oil paintings to electronic paintings which are all works of Claude Strilio. Anything Box has released several albums, EPs, and singles, and continues to perform around the world.

The band's name comes from the title of a book of short stories by Zenna Henderson, The Anything Box. In the title story, a young girl imagines the world as she would have it, apparently by staring at an empty space between her hands. Her school teacher discovers that the box is invisible, but real.

Anything Box's most recent release is Peace (Endpop.com). Released in January 2018, it is a remastered version of their first album; it also features remixes of their hits "Living in Oblivion" and "Jubilation".

== History ==
=== Formation 1986 to 1990 ===
Anything Box was started by Claude S. (original name Claude Strilio; born in Rosario, Santa Fe, Argentina) in Paterson, New Jersey playing local clubs, such as The Pipeline in N. Newark and The Loop Lounge in Passaic. This is where Claude met Dania Morales who joined as a group shortly after. Playing numerous shows and producing demo-tapes, they drew the attention of Epic Records. The band moved to Orange County, California where Paul Rijnders joined the group.

=== Peace (1990) ===
Then they began recording their first album, Peace which was released on Epic in 1990. The band toured in support of the album. Peace MMXVIII was re-released January 18, 2018 as a newly remastered version from endpop.com

=== Worth (1992) ===
Following the success and praise for Peace in the electronic music scene, Claude and Dania headed to Germany to begin recording their second album, Worth with producer Gareth Jones. Paul Rijnders had left the band to pursue personal goals. The album was completed in 1992, but a dispute with Epic and eventual break-up with the label prevented the album's release to the public. It was later distributed by the band to members of its fan-club as the band continued to perform shows despite the non-release of the album. The album shows the softer side of Anything Box, as many of the album's songs are slower, softer, and emotional. In 2000, the album was remastered and re-issued as Worth V2 with 2 unreleased tracks.

=== Hope (1993) ===
With Claude's brother Gary joining the band, Anything Box recorded and self-released their third album, Hope on their own label, Orangewerks. The album brought back the dance floor grooves with such songs as "Answer Me", "Where Is Love and Happiness", and "Life Is Fun". The band toured in support of the album. In 1996, the album was re-issued as Hope V3 by Jarrett Records with extra remixes and new artwork.

=== Dance CD-5 (1994) ===
The band released the EP Dance CD-5. The EP features remixes of tracks from the Hope album as well as some unreleased songs.

=== The Diary: Page One (1995) ===
Claude released a solo album under the name The Diary on the Orangewerks label. The album, Page One was heavily influenced by the music of Joy Division and New Order. It is generally considered the darkest of Claude's albums.

=== Mixology.1/Living in Oblivion (1996) ===
With a high-demand for Anything Box tracks and the difficulty in obtaining singles mixes from Peace, the band released a collection of remixes and unreleased songs called Mixology.1 on Orangewerks. They also released a new version and new mixes of "Living in Oblivion". The EP, Living in Oblivion MCMXCVI A.D. was released on Jarrett Records which had merged with Orangewerks. Anything Box performed at the Synthstock Music Festival in Salt Lake City, Utah where Paul Rijnders reunited with the band for the song "Lady in Waiting" from Peace.

=== Elektrodelica (1997) ===
Dania Morales departed Anything Box and Paul Rijnders returned to the band. The band released the album Elektrodelica on Jarrett Records, including a deluxe version featuring a bonus interview disc. The album marked a musical change for Anything Box as Claude experimented in what he coins as an "elektrodelic" sound. The album fused the band's traditional synthesizers with Rijnders' guitar playing. The album is considered the band's most ambitious and daring effort and songs and sounds are considerably more diverse and the album's focus much broader. The album contains soft melodic tunes such as "Conscious" which is influenced by Claude's affection of The Beatles as well as loud, edgy songs such as "45" which is a 45-second, punk rock influenced song. "Conscious" was released as a single and "45" as a video.

=== Elektrospective (1999) ===
With anticipation for a second Mixology album, Jarrett Records instead released Elektrospective which contains alternate versions of songs from both the Peace and Worth albums. Tension between the band and the label grew as Elektrodelica only received wide-distribution, two years following its initial release and Elektrospective artwork was mis-printed. The band left Jarrett Records which later closed.

=== Recovered 1993-1995 (2000) ===
Claude discovered a collection of older Anything Box recordings from 1993-1995 on a nearly-destroyed DAT. He recovered these recordings and remastered them. They were released on an album called Recovered 1993-1995. Recovered was released on the band's new, self-owned label, Presswerk.13.

=== The Universe Is Expanding (2001) ===
Following in the footsteps of Elektrodelica, Anything Box continued its musical experimentation. The band released 100% Air-Friendly Groove Pak, an EP featuring the single "Clean" and a beat-box, hip-hop influenced B-side called "Radio Static". The band followed with the album The Universe Is Expanding on Presswerk.13. The album continued the band's fusion of synthesizers, guitar, and bass guitar. Dania Morales returned to provide backing vocals on several tracks, but did not perform live with the band. Dave South joined the band on keyboards and bass guitar.

=== The Effects of Stereo TV (2003) ===
Anything Box released The Effects of Stereo TV on Presswerk.13 as a companion/follow-up album to The Universe Is Expanding; a short, in-your-face experience. The album continued the band's synthesizer and guitar sound, but while some songs are soft melodies, others are abrasive guitar-driven rock songs.

=== The Diary: Separate (2005) ===
While debating the direction for the next Anything Box album, Claude experimented with playing several instruments on his own including guitar, bass, and drums. The result was his most personal work to date. Returning as The Diary, he released Separate, a lo-fi mixture of synthesizers and live instruments all performed by Claude. Many of the song's lyrics are based on Claude's life experiences including his near-death by drowning when he was young. The result was an album truly from the heart as Claude expressed himself in a manner he had never done so before.

=== The Future Past EP (2007) ===
With Dania Morales returning to the lineup and Dave South and Gary S departing, Anything Box came full-circle and returned to the same lineup as its original Peace album from 1990. Having played several "reunion" shows throughout the Americas, the demand for new material grew. Anything Box renamed its label Endpop and released The Future Past EP in June. The EP features a remake and remixes of the band's popular 1990 song, "Carmen". It also includes a version of the song in Spanish. This is the first Anything Box song release sung in Spanish. The EP also features remixes of other popular Anything Box songs as well as some new material.

=== Fan Tapes and Time Travel (2007, short films) ===
Also in 2007, the band began releasing a series of short films put together by Claude S called Fan Tapes and Time Travel on the internet. These films were constructed from old video footage of the band throughout its history which have been provided by its fans. It continued as a work in progress.

=== Nineteen 1987-1988 (2008) ===
With a large collection of old Anything Box recordings in his possession, Claude, after much deliberation, decided to share some of this raw, early material from his past. Taking a cassette tape of these old recordings, Claude remastered and repaired them. The end result was Nineteen, a short digitally released album. The songs date back to 1987-1988, with the exception of the final track which is roughly from 1990. The sound is darker, sadder, and quite a contrast to Peace, which would be the band's first official release in 1990. Being a digital release, the website with a backstory and artwork was created in conjunction with the album. The Book of Nineteen features a collection of Claude's own artwork, as well as a streaming version of the album.

=== Volume One 1988-1989 (2013) ===
Volume One is a collection of Anything Box songs Claude remastered, including some remixes of "Living in Oblivion" and a new remix of "Kiss of Love" (the Pumped Mix). It also includes songs from the albums Worth, Hope, Elektrodelica, The Universe Is Expanding, The Recovered, The Effect of Stereo TV, and four unreleased songs from early Anything Box demos dated from 1988-1989. Volume One was published on the Argentinian record label, Twilight Records.

=== Distances 2015-2018 (2015) ===
Mired in controversy, the 2 CD set titled simply Claude Distances was originally set to become the next Anything Box album, but due to internal pressures within the group, it was released as a solo album. Released on the endpop.com label, the album features the songs "Fast Forward", "Dead Stars", "Hello".

== Band member projects ==
Claude S has released three albums as his solo project, the Diary, as well as a solo album titled Distances under his own name, Claude.

Paul Rijnders has several music projects including Goodbye July (synthpop) and the Lamented (garage rock). He is also known as a mashup remixer under the pseudonym Kult Litre, best known for the underground drum & bass remix of the Doors' "L.A. Woman".

Dania Morales had a brief solo stint with Cellophane Flowers.

Dave South currently plays bass guitar for the Valley Arena.

Gary S is also known as The Notorious B.O.X., for his beat-boxing skills.

Claude S and a friend, Steve B, posted a semi-monthly Internet radio program called "The Listen Show" where they were often joined by other friends, including Paul Rijnders. The show was basically the participants playing and discussing a wide assortment of songs. It also served as a means of updating fans to the latest Anything Box news.

== Discography ==
=== Albums ===
- Peace (1990)
- Worth (1992) (known as "Black Cassette" version, produced by Gareth Jones. Remastered and reissued in 2000 titled Worth V2 with 2 unreleased tracks)
- Hope (1993) (first official release on the label Orangewerks Produkt Ltd, limited to 5,000 units. Re-released in 1993 in new packaging and in 1996 by Jarrett Records titled Hope V3 with extra remixes and new artwork)
- Elektrodelica (1997) (full-length album released on Jarrett Records. There is also a limited edition 2-CD set of this album floating around which contained outtakes and acoustic versions)
- The Universe Is Expanding (2001)
- The Effects of Stereo TV (2003)
- Nineteen (2008)
- Unknown Destinations (Demo Tape) (2018) (an Anything Box album that was recorded a few years before Anything Box's rise to fame with their first album, Peace. It was recorded by Claude S. straight to tape. Consider this a mixed tape of gems never previously heard. Released on December 1 on Anything Box's Bandcamp page)
- Otherverses (2024)
- Nobody Feared Television I (2025)

=== Compilation albums ===
- Dance CD5 (1994) (CD contained all the Twitch remixes, plus remixes of "Every Single Day")
- Mixology 1 (1994) (effectively a 'best of' collection of tracks released only on 12" vinyl of "Living in Oblivion", "Jubilation", "Beat of Life" and unreleased B-sides on one disc)
- Elektrospective (1999) (CD compilation of early demo versions and unreleased remixes of previously released material)
- Recovered 1993-1995 (2000) (CD released material written between Hope and Page One. It was initially known as Deconstructivism, but after the masters were damaged, preventing the release. After remastering and mixing the surviving songs, the name was changed to Recovered. This is the first release on Presswerk13)
- Sharewear 1 Orange (2001) (no longer available) (a T-shirt/CDR with a selection of rarities and classics)
- Sharewear 2 Blue (2001) (no longer available) (shirt/CD combo)
- Binaural Repeats: 1993–2002 (2002) (the front 'cover' of this download-only collection states "An elektrodelic body of enhanced works. Produced by Anything Box. Recorded at various studios. This is freeware so share it." Distributed at the time from the band's own webpage, and mentioned on slashdot.org in 2003. The album does not appear to be available on their site any longer)
- Nineteen (2008) (Claude remastered an old tape of early Anything Box recordings. The songs pre-date the band's first album, Peace)
- Volume One (2013) ('Best of' Anything Box collection including remixes of "Living in Oblivion" and "Kiss of Love" and songs from Peace, Hope, Worth, Elektrodelica, The Universe Is Expanding, The Effect of Stereo TV and some early demo songs from 1988-1989; "Heaven", "Destination", "Ascension" and "Pray")

=== Extended plays ===
- Ascension EP (1989) (no longer available) (cassette-only release sold at early shows, including songs "Living in Oblivion", "World Without Love", "Kiss of Love", "Ascension" and "Heaven". "Kiss of Love" and "Living in Oblivion" entered the college chart in NJ and lead to a management deal in California, prompting the band's move to the West Coast)
- Descension EP (1989) (unreleased cassette-only demo. "The Pain I Inherited" is one of the few surviving songs)
- 100% Air-Friendly Groove Pak (2001) (EP to promote the release of The Universe Is Expanding)
- Future Past EP (2008)
- Hope //:\ Worth EP (2024)

Most of the physical copies of these releases are out of print but can be found digitally on iTunes, CD Baby, or Amazon Music.

=== Singles ===
- 1988: "Beat of Life"/"I Know What You Want" (12" single, demo single pressed on lacquer for loan to DJs)
- 1988: "Living in Oblivion"/"Time to Go" (12" single, demo single pressed on lacquer for loan to DJs. Also contained a slow mix of "Living in Oblivion" on B-side)
- 1990: "Living in Oblivion" (Epic Records) - U.S. #65, U.S. Dance #10
- 1990: "Jubilation" - U.S. Dance #16 (2 variations of this CD single were released; one for radio, and one for retail. The retail version had "Do You Hear Me Anymore" as a B-side. A 12" single was pressed in the US, and a 7" single in Mexico by Sony Music)
- 1991: "Soul on Fire"/"Our Dreams" (released as a 12" single with a CD single released only to radio)
- 1994: "Where Is Love & Happiness" - U.S. Dance #26 (12" single with remixes by Twitch and Anything Box, limited to 1,000 units)
- 1996: "Living in Oblivion" (newly recorded and remixed version of the 1989 release with mixes by Digital 3, Paul Robb, Rythmus, Seven Red Seven, and the band. Released as part of a deal with Jarrett Records)
- 1997: "Conscious"
- 1997: "45" (video was released first, with plans for a CD single with remixes by The Claw. Jarrett Records ceased operations)

=== Claude S. solo albums ===
- 1994: Page One (as The Diary)
- 2005: Separate (as The Diary)
- 2014: Seven Sleepless Nights (as The Diary) (Claude's third, and most current album under the Diary name. It was an acoustic album released digitally only on iTunes, CD Baby and Bandcamp)
- 2015: Distances (double album self-released by Claude under his own name and funded by fans on PledgeMusic)
