= John Van Tongeren =

American keyboardist (born 1961)

- Also known as: JVT
- Born: March 10, 1961 (age 65); Seattle, Washington, U.S.
- Origin: Phoenix, Arizona, U.S.
- Genres: Film score, synthpop, pop, pop rock
- Occupations: Composer, music producer, songwriter, keyboardist
- Instruments: Keyboards, synthesizer
- Years active: 1980s–present
- Member of: Trinom3
- Website: johnvantongeren.net

John Van Tongeren (born March 10, 1961) is an American keyboardist and composer for films and television.

== Biography ==
Van Tongeren's career in the entertainment business began as a keyboardist, with one of his earliest projects being the band Q, featuring Jon St. James and Stacey Swain (a.k.a. Stacey Q). Q then became SSQ, which released one album, Playback, on EMI records with John contributing four songs, most notably Anonymous. After leaving SSQ in the early '80s, Van Tongeren became an in-demand session musician and began composing music for movies. As a musician, he has worked with Chicago, Roger Daltrey, Robbie Nevil, John Parr, The Chantoozies, Starship, Jeff Beck, Quincy Jones, Al Jarreau, The Pointer Sisters, Living in a Box, Stryper, and others. He currently works out of The Blue Room, a recording studio in Los Angeles.

Van Tongeren began his film scoring career as one of the original members of Media Ventures (now Remote Control Productions). During his time at Media Ventures Van Tongeren worked on films such as Thelma & Louise, True Romance and Drop Zone with Hans Zimmer. He also collaborated with Mark Mancina on Speed, Moll Flanders, Fair Game, Assassins and Twister.

Van Tongeren then began to compose music for television series, including Poltergeist: The Legacy and the nineties revival of The Outer Limits, which he won awards for. Van Tongeren again collaborated with Mancina on the Speed sequel, Speed 2: Cruise Control, and then worked with Trevor Rabin on the 1998 film Armageddon.

Outside of film and television Van Tongeren was asked to compose three orchestral interludes and contribute production for the late jazz drummer Tony Williams' 1996 album Wilderness.

In the 2000s Van Tongeren continued working on film scores, such as XXX and The Mummy: Tomb of the Dragon Emperor with Randy Edelman, The Passion of the Christ with John Debney, Miss Congeniality 2: Armed and Fabulous and the Disney films The Cheetah Girls and Princess Protection Program. He also scored more sci-fi television series including The 4400, for which he won the BMI award.

His songwriting has led to platinum CDs for Rhythm of the Pride Lands – Disney, and The Cheetah Girls, as well as the Top Ten hit single for Starship, "It's Not Over ('Til It's Over)" and 3 songs on the Wall-E Inspired by CD.

2010 saw projects including Iron Man 2 and Predators with John Debney and movies for Nickelodeon and Disney. Van Tongeren also wrote and produced songs on Disney's Tinker Bell and the Lost Treasure and Bayou Boogie: Inspired by Princess & the Frog.

From 2014 to 2018, Van Tongeren scored the music of The Tom and Jerry Show for WB, airing on Cartoon Network and Boomerang. Staying true to the style of the original cartoons from the 1940s and '50s, the series has Van Tongeren writing in a mix of orchestral and old school big band styles. In 2015 Van Tongeren wrote, sang and performed the theme to DreamWorks Animation Television's Dawn of the Croods, which ran for four seasons on Netflix.

Trinom3 is John's jazz project that has released two albums so far. Details are Sketchy and Just a Bit Further.

== Awards ==
Van Tongeren has won numerous awards, the most prestigious of which are a Daytime Emmy, BMI Award and two Gemini Awards.

In 2000 and 2001, Van Tongeren won the Gemini Award for Best Original Music Score for a Dramatic Series, for The Outer Limits; these were for the episodes "Tribunal" and "Simon Says" respectively. In 2005, Van Tongeren won a BMI Cable Award for the television series The 4400; which he shared with Tim P., Stephen Phillips, George S. Clinton and Claude Foisy. Van Tongeren won an Emmy in 2019 for his scores on WB Animation's The Tom and Jerry Show.

== Personal life ==
Van Tongeren grew up in Phoenix, Arizona.

== Filmography ==
- Dawn of the Croods
- The Tom and Jerry Show (52 episodes, 2014–2018)
- Swindle
- The Suite Life Movie
- Rockin' the Wall
- Den Brother
- The Boy Who Cried Werewolf
- Princess Protection Program
- Twitches Too
- WarGames: The Dead Code
- Christmas Is Here Again
- The 4400 (21 episodes, 2004–2007)
- The Initiation of Sarah
- Thief (6 episodes)
- Masters of Science Fiction (1 episode)
- Wanted (5 episodes)
- Twitches
- Empire
- Miss Congeniality 2: Armed and Fabulous
- Son of the Mask (additional music)
- Jesus the Driver
- Van Helsing: The London Assignment
- The Five People You Meet in Heaven (additional music)
- Lilo & Stitch: The Series (uncredited)
- Don: Plain & Tall
- The Cheetah Girls
- Malibu's Most Wanted
- Teenage Mutant Ninja Turtles (various episodes)
- XXX (additional music)
- The Scorpion King (additional music)
- Disney's The Legend of Tarzan
- The Outer Limits (54 episodes, 1995–2000)
- Red Letters
- Poltergeist: The Legacy (36 episodes, 1996–99)
- The Magnificent Seven (3 episodes, 1998–99)
- Creature
- Armageddon (additional music)
- Speed 2: Cruise Control (additional music)
- Dante's Peak (additional music)
- Metro (additional music)
- Twister (additional music)
- Assassins (additional music)
- Speed (additional music)
- Drop Zone (additional music)
- Monkey Trouble (additional music)
- Renaissance Man (additional music)
- True Romance (additional music)
- Thelma & Louise (additional music)
- The Adventures of the Galaxy Rangers

== Discography ==
- Starship: Love Among the Cannibals
- Steve Porcaro: Someday/Somehow
- Trinom3: Just a Bit Further
- Trinom3: Details are Sketchy
