= Casteel =

- Maboke
- Location within Mpumalanga Location within South Africa
- Coordinates: 24.7247°S 31.0201°E
- Country: South Africa
- Province: Mpumalanga
- District: Ehlanzeni
- Municipality: Bushbuckridge
  - Ward 14 Councillor: (ANC)

Area
  - Total: 13.58 km^{2} (5.24 sq mi)

Population (2011)
  - Total: 12,752
  - Density: 939.0/km^{2} (2,432/sq mi)

Racial makeup (2011)
  - Black African: 99.8%
  - Indian/Asian: 0.1%

First languages (2011)
  - Northern Sotho: 68.8%
  - Tsonga: 24.8%
  - Swazi: 1.8%
  - Sotho: 1.4%
  - Other: 3.2%
- Time zone: UTC+2 (SAST)
- Postal code (street): 1370
- PO box: 1370

Casteel is a town in Ehlanzeni District Municipality in the Mpumalanga province of South Africa. The legal name was changed to Maboke in 2008. Maboke is place consisting of Mapulana (whom speak Sepulana ) and Tsonga people. There is a proud culture of Dikoma (initiation school) which takes place during the winter times, during the months of June to August annually, and is a place where young boys are taught the cultural and roots of the Mapulana people.
