= Cavegirl (film) =

1985 film

- Movie Poster: Cavegirl (1985)
- Directed by: David Oliver
- Produced by: David Oliver
- Starring: Daniel Roebuck; Cynthia Thompson; Bill Adams
- Production company: Crown International Pictures
- Release date: 1985
- Running time: 86 minutes
- Country: United States
- Language: English

The 1985 sex comedy Cavegirl was written and directed by David Oliver and starring Daniel Roebuck, Cynthia Thompson, and Stacey Q in her film debut.

== Plot ==
Rex, a clumsy high school student, gets lost in a cave while on a class excursion. A crystal opens a time portal and sends him back in time to caveman days. There he meets beautiful cavegirl, Eba. Rex tries to get Eba to sleep with him.

== Cast ==
- Daniel Roebuck as Rex
- Cynthia Thompson as Eba (credited as Cindy Ann Thompson)
- Darren Young as Dar
- Saba Moor-Doucette as Saba (credited as Saba Moor)
- Jeff Chayette as Argh
- Charles Mitchell as Char
- Cynthia Rullo as Aka
- Tom Hamill as Casey
- Bill Adams as Bill
- Chris Noble as Hank
- Bill Sehres as Ralph
- Syndi King as Karen
- A.A. Cavallaro as Rex's Father
- Maggie Ostroff as Rex's Mother
- Stacey Q as Brenda (credited as Stacey Swain)
- Michelle Bauer as Locker Room Student
