= Enigma Records =

American record label

- Parent company: Greenworld Distribution (until 1985); EMI (from 1989); Universal Music Group (back catalog); Disney Music Group (Stryper catalog); Warner Music Group (Restless catalog); Primary Wave Music (DEVO catalog)
- Founded: 1980
- Founder: William and Wesley Hein
- Defunct: 1991
- Status: Defunct
- Distributors: Capitol Records (reissues); Hollywood Records (Stryper reissues)
- Genre: Hard rock; heavy metal; alternative; punk
- Country of origin: United States
- Location: Torrance, El Segundo, Culver City, California

Enigma Records (also known as Enigma Entertainment Corporation) was a popular rock and alternative American record label in the 1980s.

== History ==
Enigma Records launched as a division of Greenworld Distribution, an independent music importer/distributor, in 1981. Four years later, in 1985, Enigma severed ties with Greenworld and became its own company. Enigma was initially located in Torrance, California, then El Segundo, California and finally Culver City, California. Enigma was founded and run by brothers William and Wesley Hein. Jim Martone joined the company in 1984. Enigma focused on punk rock, alternative, and heavy metal music though it also released techno (Synthicide Records), jazz (Intima Records) and classical music (Enigma Classics) through subsidiary labels.

The label's first release was Mötley Crüe's Too Fast for Love. The album was initially released under the band's own Leathür Records imprint but manufactured, marketed and distributed by what would become the Enigma Records team. After the band moved on to Elektra Records, the Enigma Records name was adopted and all subsequent artists were released under this new name. Enigma's next major success was with the pop band Berlin.

Enigma Records was initially distributed through independent record importers/distributors such as Jem Records and Important Records. In 1984, Enigma entered into a joint venture with EMI America to sign and develop new artists. Among the artists signed under the venture were the Red Hot Chili Peppers and SSQ (later renamed Stacey Q and signed to Atlantic Records). In 1986, Enigma moved its distribution to Capitol/EMI, a major record label, while leaving its Restless Records division with the independent distributors that had previously distributed Enigma. Poison, a glam rock band, and The Smithereens were two of the first artists released under the joint Enigma / Capitol relationship, both of which had significant success. That same year it launched a music video line, which was also distributed by Capitol.

Billboard noted in March 1987 that Enigma had "helped break" acts including Mötley Crüe, Berlin, and Ratt before scoring its best-selling album with Stryper's To Hell with the Devil.

Stryper was one of Enigma's biggest commercial successes. Sandra Gutschen, Enigma's retail and promotion manager, told Billboard in April 1985 that "in metal circles, Enigma is best known for the odd but effective ingredients present in Stryper." According to Circus Special Edition "The Year in Rock'n'Roll" (1986), The Yellow and Black Attack, had been certified as the "label's best seller to date, outdistancing stiff competition from early Mötley Crüe, Ratt and Berlin". Their 1986 album To Hell with the Devil leaped to number 39 on the Billboard 200 in its second week, the first Enigma album ever to crack the top 40, and was eventually certified platinum, making it the first contemporary Christian music album to achieve that status. Billboard noted that Stryper's success had "surprised major labels", observing that "Christian metal sells." At the 30th Annual NARM Best Seller Awards in 1988, To Hell with the Devil won best-selling gospel/spiritual album, defeating Amy Grant, who had won the award for the previous four consecutive years, as well as Aretha Franklin and Al Green.

Enigma president Wesley Hein described the label's approach to the band's dual audience: "The traditional heavy metal market believed that the music was the message, and the Christian market believed the message was the message. Our approach was to affirm each camps' beliefs — we could emphasize the music to the secular fans, and the message to the Christian fans, because the band is tremendously strong in both areas."

In December 1985, Cliff Burnstein, co-manager of Def Leppard and Metallica, described Stryper as "the biggest independent hard rock band in America."

In addition to the primary Enigma Records label, the company had two smaller subsidiary labels as well as a music publishing company (La Rana / El Porto Music administered by Bug Music). Enigma Retro focused on re-issues of material licensed from other labels such as Straight Records, Bizarre Records, and DiscReet Records. The Restless Records division focused on alternative artists not intended for major label distribution. Enigma also released film soundtracks including The Terminator and River's Edge. Enigma released a compilation album, Enigma Variations, with various artists. Enigma had a joint venture with Mute Records and released certain Mute titles in the United States. Sonic Youth's landmark 1988 album Daydream Nation was originally released on Enigma Records, in association with Blast First Records.

Enigma was formally acquired by Capitol/EMI in 1989. Some of its catalog and operations were merged into the still independent Restless Records in 1991.

Enigma's Canadian division was closed in 1992 and was reorganized into FRE Records before shuttering in 1999, after which its back catalogs was sold to DROG Records.

The Enigma catalog is controlled by Capitol Music Group, owned by Universal Music Group which acquired Capitol's former parent EMI and the majority of its recorded music operations in 2012. Disney Music Group's Hollywood Records, distributed by UMG, handles the reissues of Stryper's Enigma albums. The catalog of Enigma titles that were merged into Restless is owned by Warner Music Group, which acquired Restless's previous parent Rykodisc in 2006, and distributed by the Alternative Distribution Alliance, while the catalog of DEVO's Enigma albums is owned jointly by Primary Wave Music and the band's members, and distributed by Universal Music Group.

== Artists ==
- 7 Seconds
- 20/20
- 45 Grave
- Agent Orange
- Antix
- Bardeux
- Barren Cross
- Battalion of Saints
- Berlin
- David Cassidy
- Casteel
- Celtic Frost
- Channel 3
- Close Lobsters
- The Cramps
- Dead Milkmen
- Death Angel
- The Descendents
- Devo
- The Dickies
- Don Dixon
- The Dream Syndicate
- The Effigies
- Roky Erickson
- Fear
- The Fibonaccis
- The Flaming Lips
- Game Theory
- Get Smart!
- GG Allin
- Girlschool
- Goo Goo Dolls
- Great White
- Green on Red
- Guardian
- Peter Hammill
- Allan Holdsworth
- Hurricane
- Hüsker Dü
- Jon and the Nightriders
- Steve Kilbey
- Lȧȧz Rockit
- Laibach
- The Leaving Trains
- Lizzy Borden
- Mekons
- The Minutemen
- Ronnie Montrose
- Mojo Nixon
- Mötley Crüe
- Motörhead
- Naked Raygun
- Necros
- Bill Nelson
- Obsession
- Pere Ubu
- Plan 9
- Plasticland
- Poison
- Chris Poland
- Rain Parade
- Ratt
- Red Flag
- Red Hot Chili Peppers
- Redd Kross
- The Residents
- Sacred Reich
- Greg Sage
- Skid Roper
- Saxon
- Screamin' Sirens
- Shooting Star
- Slayer
- The Smithereens
- Sonic Youth
- Al Stewart
- Stryper
- Surf Punks
- Tex and the Horseheads
- They Might Be Giants
- Thor
- Tom Peterson and Another Language
- T.S.O.L.
- The U-Krew
- Untouchables
- The Vandals
- Ben Vaughn
- Vinnie Vincent Invasion
- Voivod
- Wall of Voodoo
- Wasted Youth
- Wednesday Week
- Wild Dogs
- Ike Willis
- Wire
- XYZ
- Znowhite

== See also ==
- Lists of record labels
