= Bardeux =

American dance duo

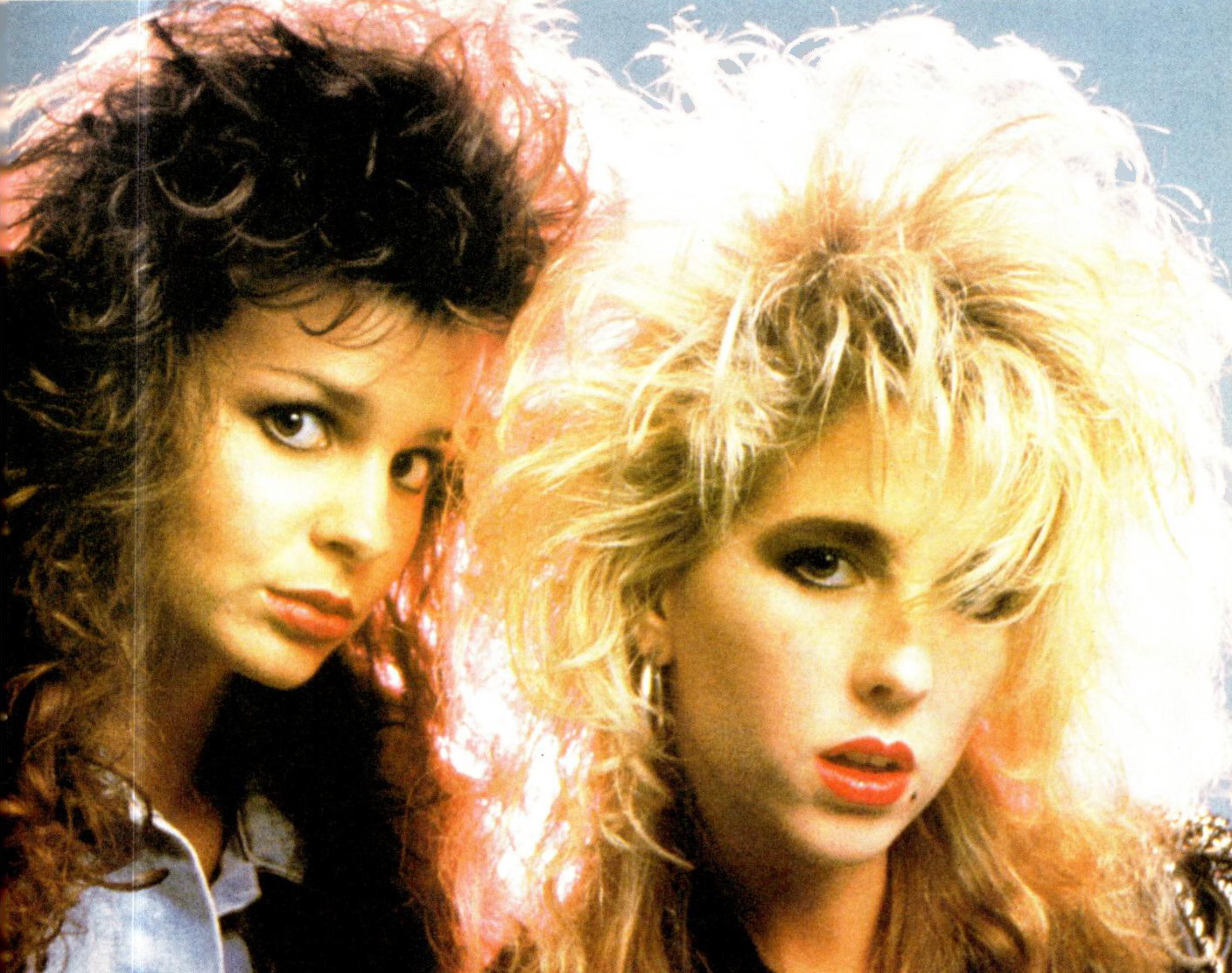
- Bardeux (Stacy "Acacia" Smith and Lisa "Jaz" Teaney) c. 1988

Background information
- Genres: Pop; dance
- Members: Stacy "Acacia" Smith
- Past members: Tairrie B, Lisa "Jaz" Teaney, Melanie Taylor

Bardeux is an American dance duo from the 1980s. The group was formed in 1986 and originally consisted of Stacy "Acacia" Smith and Tairrie B.

== History ==
Their first single, "Three Time Lover", went to No. 10 on Billboard's Hot Dance Singles Sales chart. Tairrie B left the group to pursue a solo career and was replaced by Lisa "Jaz" Teaney. In 1988, the group released their album Bold as Love and their second single "Magic Carpet Ride". The single went to No. 5 on Billboard's Hot Dance Singles Sales chart and No. 81 on the Billboard Hot 100. The group performed the song on Club MTV. "When We Kiss", the third single from the album, would turn out to be the group's biggest hit going all the way to No. 36 on the Billboard Hot 100. The fourth single released from the album, "Bleeding Heart", was a top 40 hit on the Billboard's Hot Dance Singles Sales chart. A fifth and last single release from that album, "Hold Me, Hold Me" did not chart.

Jaz left the group in 1989 and was replaced by Melanie Taylor. Shangri-La was the group's second and last album. "I Love to Bass" was the only single from the album to make it on to the Billboard Hot 100, peaking at No. 68, No. 3 on the Hot Dance Music/Club Play chart, No. 32 on the Hot R&B/Hip-Hop Singles & Tracks chart. The second single "Thumbs Up" made it to No. 17 on the Hot Dance Music/Club Play chart and No. 59 on the Hot R&B/Hip-Hop Singles & Tracks chart. The last single from the album, the title track "Shangri-La," rose to No. 40 on the Hot Dance Music/Club Play chart. Jon St. James produced both Bardeux albums.

Bardeux is often considered a one-hit wonder, but the group produced many dance hits in their short career.

Acacia resurfaced as a new incarnation of Bardeux (presumably a solo act) in 1995 with the single "Be My Man" (credited as "Bardeux Featuring Acacia") on Thump Records in 1995, taken from the compilation album Thump Retro Disco Volume 3. Melanie Taylor later went on to perform as one of The Staggering Harlettes (Bette Midler's backup troupe) from 1993 to 2000, and released a collection of holiday songs on a solo album, This Christmas, in 2000. Tairrie B went on to release a critically acclaimed gangsta rap album called Power of a Woman on Comptown/MCA Records in 1990, and then resurfaced in the late 1990s as the co-founder and lead singer of the nu metal band Manhole (later renamed Tura Satana for legal reasons), and then the alternative metal band My Ruin in the 2000s.

== Discography ==
Albums

- Bold as Love (1988, Synthicide Records)
- Shangri-La (1989, Enigma Records)

== Singles ==
- Magic Carpet Ride (1987), Peaked #5 on Billboard Hot Dance Singles and #81 on US Billboard Hot 100
- Three-time Lover (1987), Peaked at #10 on Billboard Hot Dance Singles Sales
- Bleeding Heart (1988), Top 40 on Billboard Hot Dance Singles.
- When We Kiss (1988), Peaked at #36 on US Billboard Hot 100.
- Hold me, Hold me (1989)
- I love the Bass (1989), Peaked at #68 on US Billboard Hot 100, #3 on the Hot Dance Music/Club Play chart.
- Shangri-La (1990), Peaked at #40 on the Hot Dance Music/Club Play.
- Thumbs up (1990), Peaked at #17 on the Hot Dance Music/Club Play.
- Be My Man (Bardeux Feat. Acacia) (1995)
