= Boomerang (Stacey Q album) =

Studio album by Stacey Q
- Released: October 21, 1997
- Recorded: 1997 at En Pro, Aire, Los Angeles, A&M
- Genre: Folk rock
- Length: 47:05
- Label: ENo Records
- Producer: Michael Eckhart & Dain Noel

Stacey Q chronology
Stacey Q's Greatest Hits (1995)	Boomerang (1997)	Color Me Cinnamon (2010)

Boomerang is an album by Stacey Q released in 1997, showcasing the singer's conversion to Buddhism. The album is folk-spiritual, featuring Stacey Q's version of "My Sweet Lord". The single "Tenderness" peaked on the Jamaican charts at number five.

== Track listing ==
1. "Boomerang" (Scott Matthews, Jenni Muldaur, Bob Miller) (3:06)
2. "Tenderness" (Janis Ian, Buddy Mondlock) (3:41)
3. "Holding Onto The Earth" (Sam Phillips, T-Bone Burnett) (2:52)
4. "I Doubt If It Does To You" (Gwil Owen) (3:31)
5. "Love On" (Matthews, Muldaur, Andy Milton) (3:31)
6. "Tara" (Stacey Swain) (4:36)
7. "Never Stop" (Michael Eckhart, Dain Noel, Swain) (3:54)
8. "My Sweet Lord" (George Harrison) (4:14)
9. "All I Ever Wanted" (Eckhart, Noel, Swain) (4:05)
10. "Something About You" (Eckhart) (4:20)
11. "I Don't Know How To Say Goodbye To You" (Phillips) (3:30)
12. "Clear Light" (Swain) (5:45)

== Personnel ==
=== Musicians ===
- Stacey Q. - lead vocals, background vocals
- Basil Fung - guitar, (tracks 1–11) machine (track 9)
- Larry Milton - guitar (tracks 2, 5)
- Brendon McNichol - guitar (track 6), Russian balalaika (track 10)
- Bradley Cummings - bass (tracks 1–8, 10–11)
- Johnny Friday - drums (tracks 1–7)
- Frank Reina - percussion (tracks 1, 8, 11) drums (tracks 8, 10–11)
- Peter Bunetta - percussion (tracks 2–4, 10)
- Carlos Murguia - B3 (tracks 1–5, 11)
- Michael Eckhart - technics keyboards and programming
- Dain Noel - technics keyboards and programming
- Gene Van Buren - background vocals (track 4)

=== Production ===
- Gabe Drapel - executive producer
- George Grimm - executive director
- Fred Burgouise - publishing administration for Bug Music
- Eddie Gomez - publishing administration for Bug Music
- Steve Levesque - publicity for The Lee Solters Company
- Westminster Press - visual art
- Dean Lopez - photography
- Maxx (Maxx Salon) - Stacey's cut & color
- Gregg Wadley - boomerang (front cover)
- Margaret Clampitt - hospitality
- Charles Clampitt - hospitality
- Leah-Donna Geon - hospitality, personal assistance
- Peter Jordan - hospitality, security
- Betty Wontorek - hospitality
- Bernie Wontorek - hospitality
- Dave Collins - mastering
- Debbie Korvitz - support team
- Sean Winstian - support team
- Sebastian Reich - support team
- Raj Butani - support team
- Gregg Ryan - support team
- Gina Quartaro - support team
- Tim Crandall - support team
