= SSQ (band) =

American 1980s synthpop band

- Origin: Norwalk, California, U.S.
- Genres: Synthpop, dance-pop, new wave
- Years active: 1983–1988; 2020
- Labels: Enigma (1983); EMI America (1983–1984); Atlantic (1986–1988); Synthicide Records (2020)
- Past members: Stacey Swain; Jon St. James; John Van Tongeren; Rich West; Karl Moet; Skip Hahn

SSQ (formerly Q) is a synthpop outfit consisting of Stacey Swain, Jon St. James, and past members include Dan Van Patten and John Van Tongeren, Rich West, Karl Moët and Skip Hahn. Their debut album Playback received praise from critics when released in 1983. As of 2020, Jon St. James and Stacey Swain resurfaced as SSQ, releasing a full-length album of new material titled Jet Town Je t’aime. As Stacey Q, Swain had a solo hit with her single “Two of Hearts” in 1986. SSQ members stayed on as her band for television and concert performances.

== History ==
=== Formation ===
The original Q project was composed of Stacey Swain as lead singer, Jon St. James on guitars, and Dan Van Patten and John Van Tongeren on vocoder and synthesizer; it was a small American techno band. It was formed in 1982 by Jon St. James and Stacey Swain, and named after the James Bond character. Ross Wood was also a group member. The group only had two releases: a 7" single of their song "Playback" on Cocteau Records, and a four-track EP released almost exclusively to college radio stations that has become known among fans as The Q EP. Only 1,000 copies were printed of the EP.

In 1982 the band reformed with two new members, drummer Karl Moet and synth player Rich West, alongside the official lineup of Van Tongeren, St. James and Swain. After the reformation, St. James was forced to change the name of Q because of copyright problems (famed producer Quincy Jones reportedly had "established use of the 'Q' moniker"). Swain explained in a 2006 radio interview that the band was renamed SSQ after Jon St. James "was fishing in a lake 'no bigger than a bathtub' and made a joke that the boat was the 'S.S. Q,'" referring to the current band Q. St. James had another reason for the name: "SS" stood for "Stacey Swain", who had become the most recognized of the band's members.

=== 1983–1984: Playback ===
SSQ first released their debut album Playback in 1983 under Enigma Records. The band's first live performance was held at the Greenworld Distribution warehouse in Torrance, which was then the location of the Enigma label. The video for "Synthicide" later premiered on West Coast television and brought greater notoriety for the five-member band. By 1984, Stacey Swain was already eclipsing her bandmates in popularity. The band ultimately shifted its focus on Swain specifically, with Moet, West, Skip Hahn and St. James as backup performers. Hahn officially replaced John Van Tongeren on keyboards, vocoder and bass just before the release of Playback.

"Synthicide", "Big Electronic Beat" and "Clockwork" appeared on the soundtrack of the 1984 comedy Hardbodies, while "Synthicide", "Walkman On", and "Anonymous" appeared on the soundtrack of the 1985 comedy Cavegirl. St. James served as composer of the latter film, with Swain having a brief appearance as the character "Brenda". SSQ also contributed two tracks, "Tonight (We'll Make Love Until We Die)" and "Trash's Theme", to the soundtrack of the 1985 zombie flick The Return of the Living Dead. "Tonight" is the track played by boom box when Trash, played by Linnea Quigley, performs the film's famous graveyard striptease.

In television, SSQ recorded background tracks for productions including St. Elsewhere, Hill Street Blues and WKRP in Cincinnati. In addition, "Playback", an unreleased song from their debut, was included on The Enigma Variations Vol. 1, a compilation album by various artist. The track "Anonymous" can be heard during the end credits of the 2011 film Beyond the Black Rainbow.

In 1985, lead singer Stacey Q signed a recording contract, St. James started acting as her manager and SSQ as her back up band.

=== 1985–1988: Stacey Q, Better Than Heaven and Hard Machine ===
The new lineup carried on with Swain under the name Stacey Q, and they acted as musicians on her first two albums, Better Than Heaven and Hard Machine. They went on to success with dance-pop tracks like "Two of Hearts" and "We Connect". Rich West, Karl Moet and Skip Hahn were collectively credited as "SSQ" on the credits of albums and singles released as "Stacey Q". The backup members also recorded some material without Swain on vocals. One such track, the hip-hop-inspired "Pleasure Dog", was featured on The Enigma Variations Vol. 2.

In 2015, Playback was remixed by Jon. St. James, digitally remastered and re-released on iTunes, with a few bonus tracks also included in the album. In 2016, SSQ re-released it on vinyl on the Strange Disc label. Two bonus tracks included are "The Model" and "Tonight (We'll Make Love Until We Die)".

=== 2020–Present: Jet Town Je t’aime ===
On January 1, 2020, SSQ released a new album, called Jet Town Je t’aime, featuring 12 new songs. The album, their first release in 37 years, was produced by Jon St. James, and was released exclusively to digital stores and streaming services. The set includes “Trippin' Me Out,” which originally was released digitally on Dec. 10, 2019, as a Stacey Q single. Two separate music videos for the second single, “Airpods On,” were posted to Stacey Q's YouTube channel on January 27, 2020.

== Discography ==
=== Albums ===
- Playback (1983)
- Jet Town Je t’aime (2020)

With Stacey Q

- Better Than Heaven (1986)
- Hard Machine (1988)

=== Singles ===
- 1983: "Synthicide" (#47 U.S. Dance)
- 1983: "Big Electronic Beat"
- 1983: "Screaming in My Pillow" (video single)
- 1986: "Tonight (We'll Make Love Until We Die)" / "Trash's Theme" (Japan only)
- 2019: "Trippin’ Me Out" (released as Stacey Q)
- 2020: "Airpods On" (released as Stacey Q as video single)
