= Two of Hearts (song) =

1986 single by Stacey Q

Single by Stacey Q

from the album Better Than Heaven
- B-side: "Dancing Nowhere"; "Shy Girl"
- Released: June 13, 1986
- Studio: Formula 1 (La Habra, California)
- Genre: Dance-pop; Hi-NRG
- Length: 3:57
- Label: On the Spot; Atlantic
- Songwriter: John Mitchell
- Producers: Jon St. James; William Walker; Jeff Fishman

Stacey Q singles chronology
"Shy Girl" (1985)	"Two of Hearts" (1986)	"We Connect" (1986)

Music video
- "Two of Hearts" on YouTube

"Two of Hearts" is a song by American singer Stacey Q, first issued as an independent 12-inch dance club single by On the Spot Records, then picked up by Atlantic after achieving regional sales. It was written by John Mitchell, Tim Greene, and Sue Gatlin, and produced by Jon St. James, William Walker, and Jeff Fishman. The song was Stacey Q's biggest hit; its global sales success fueled the recording of her debut album Better Than Heaven (1986), which included the song. The song was released as the album's lead single on June 13, 1986.

== Background and recording ==
After the release of the album Playback (1983) with the band SSQ, Stacey Q began working with Jon St. James on her solo material. St. James brought her the song "Two of Hearts," suggesting that she record it. At first, Stacey Q refused to record a song written by someone else, but later she changed her mind. The single was co-produced by St. James, who owned the recording studio, William Walker, and nightclub deejay Jeff Fishman. The artist and producers promoted the single, especially to Latin music audiences in Los Angeles and Miami. The song was released in 1985 by On The Spot Records, but was picked up by Atlantic Records to be released as the lead single from Q's debut studio album Better Than Heaven (1986). They recorded the album in three weeks while the song was climbing the charts.

The song was originally intended for Sue Gatlin, who co-wrote it with John Mitchell and Tim Greene. She also performed the song.

The song was prominently featured in the Facts of Life episode "Off-Broadway Baby" in which Stacey Q appeared as the character Cinnamon, a teenage singer largely modeled on herself; the episode ends with her performing the song in a radio station's sound booth.

== Lyrics and music ==
Musically, "Two of Hearts" is a hi-NRG song. It utilizes vocal sampling with the repetitive usage of the line "I need you" in its hook. The song's lyrics revolve around love and romance. "Two of Hearts" received positive reviews from music critics and was a commercial success around the globe. It entered the US Billboard Hot 100 in mid-July 1986, breaking into the top 40 in mid-August and peaking at number three during the autumn of that same year to become one of the highest-selling singles of 1986. "Two of Hearts" was ranked number 27 on VH1's "100 Greatest One Hit Wonders of the '80s", although follow-up single "We Connect" was a minor hit on the Hot 100 (peaking at number 35).

This song has Japanese and Korean covers and adaptations by artists such as Yoko Nagayama (1987), Naomi Yamashita (1987), Yoko Minamino & Pals (1987), Setorae (1988), Akina Nakamori (2017). Korean group Wonder Girls sampled "Two of Hearts" for their song "Tell Me" in 2007.

== Music video ==
The accompanying music video for "Two of Hearts" was directed by Peter Lippman. It depicts Stacey Q dancing in front of a white background in various outfits and performing at a nightclub. "Two of Hearts" has been covered by a number of artists, and Stacey Q also performed the song on a season eight episode of The Facts of Life.

== Critical reception ==
Jerry Smith of the Music Week magazine described "Two of Hearts" as a "bright bubbly track" he deemed "instantly memorable" and "entertaining" thanks to its "lively disco beat and slick pop vocal". In a review published in Smash Hits, Dave Rimmer considered that the song is a "fine example of the kind of mechanical dance music that sounds brilliant in dodgy Greek discos on holidays".

== Track listings ==
- US 7-inch single (On the Spot Records)
1. "Two of Hearts" (7" Version) – 3:33
2. "Shy Girl" – 3:43
- US 12-inch single (On the Spot Records)
1. "Two of Hearts" (European Mix) – 7:29
2. "Two of Hearts" (Dance Mix) – 6:00
3. "Two of Hearts" (Radio Edit) – 3:45
4. "Stacey's Dream (A Capella) – 2:35
- US 7-inch single (Atlantic Records)
1. "Two of Hearts" (Radio Edit) – 3:58
2. "Dancing Nowhere" – 3:43
- US 12-inch single (Atlantic Records)
1. "Two of Hearts" (Vocal / European Dance Mix) – 6:00
2. "Two of Hearts" (Instrumental) – 4:39
3. "Two of Hearts" (Vocal / Radio Edit) – 3:58
4. "Stacey's Dream (A Capella) – 2:32

== Credits and personnel ==
- Stacey Q – vocals
- Jon St. James – production, keyboards
- Rich West – keyboards
- Skip Hahn – keyboards
- Karl Moet – drums
- Jeff C. Fishman – associate production
- William J. Walker – associate production
- Lester Cohen – photography

== Charts ==
=== Weekly charts ===
Weekly chart performance for "Two of Hearts"
Chart (1986–1987)	Peak position
Australia (Kent Music Report)	7
Austria (Ö3 Austria Top 40)	24
Canada Top Singles (RPM)	1
Canada (The Record)	2
Europe (European Hot 100 Singles)	20
France (SNEP)	18
New Zealand (Recorded Music NZ)	4
South Africa (Springbok Radio)	5
Sweden (Sverigetopplistan)	19
Switzerland (Schweizer Hitparade)	6
UK Singles (Official Charts)	87
UK Dance (Music Week)	62
US Billboard Hot 100	3
US 12-inch Singles Sales (Billboard)	1
US Dance/Disco Club Play (Billboard)	4
US Hot Black Singles (Billboard)	56
US Top 100 Singles (Cash Box)	7
West Germany (GfK)	6

=== Year-end charts ===
1986 year-end chart performance for "Two of Hearts"
Chart (1986)	Position
Australia (Kent Music Report)	72
Canada Top Singles (RPM)	31
New Zealand (RIANZ)	42
US Billboard Hot 100	51
US 12-inch Singles Sales (Billboard)	3
US Dance/Disco Club Play (Billboard)	39
US Top 100 Singles (Cash Box)	64

1987 year-end chart performance for "Two of Hearts"
Chart (1987)	Position
Australia (Kent Music Report)	80
South Africa (Springbok Radio)	20
