= Stacey Q =

American pop singer (born 1958)

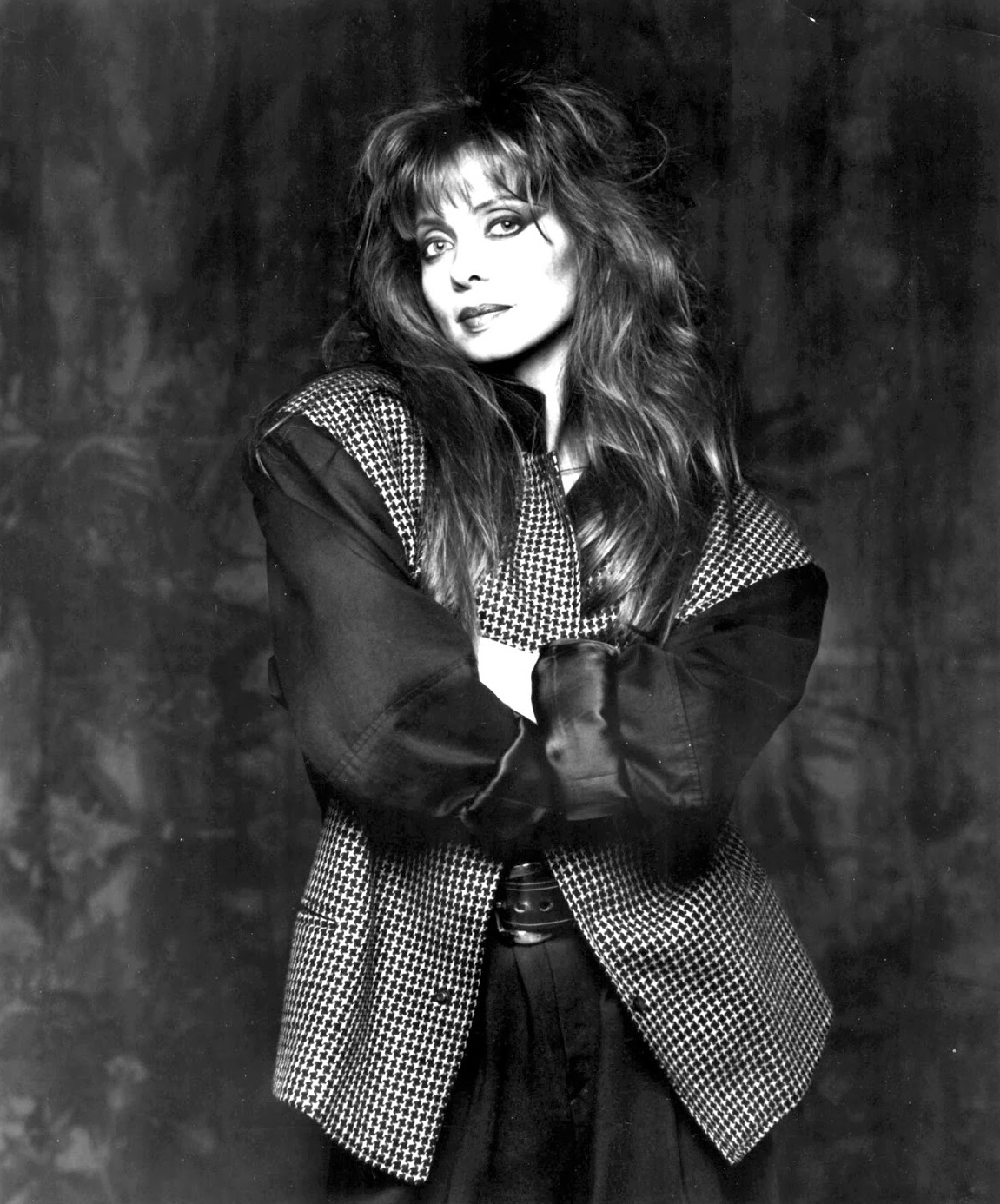
- Stacey Q, c. 1988

Background information
- Born: Stacey Lynn Swain; November 30, 1958 (age 67); Fullerton, California, U.S
- Genres: Dance-pop; new wave; freestyle; Hi-NRG
- Occupations: Singer; songwriter; dancer; actress
- Instrument: Vocals
- Years active: 1981–present
- Labels: On the Spot; Atlantic; ENo; Thump; Hydra Productions
- Formerly of: SSQ

Stacey Lynn Swain (born November 30, 1958), known by her stage name Stacey Q, is an American pop singer, songwriter, dancer and actress. Her best-known single, "Two of Hearts", released in 1986, reached number one in Canada, number three on the US Billboard Hot 100 and the top ten in five other countries.

== Early life ==
Swain was born on November 30, 1958, in the Orange County suburb of Fullerton, California. She is the youngest of three children. Her mother, Joyce, bred Cardigan Welsh Corgis that have appeared in Hollywood films and television. In a 1989 interview, Swain said she was three years old when she asked for dance lessons, but had to wait until she was five, when she did classical ballet. In 1969, she became the youngest member of the Dance Theater of Orange County, a local company that performed at benefit shows in Anaheim. She spent 11 years studying ballet and also learned flamenco dancing. She performed at multiple Disneyland's Christmas Fantasy on Parade events. She studied at the Community Theatre of Performing Arts and the Wilshire Theatre of Arts. She also performed in costume as the "Dutch Puppet", a name she used as a publishing alias during her early recording career. She went to Loara High School during her sophomore year, but then transferred to Anaheim High School. After graduating from high school in 1976, Swain joined the Ringling Brothers and Barnum & Bailey Circus, where she performed as a showgirl in her first year, and as an elephant rider in her second year. Her first singing project was a Los Angeles radio spot where she introduced and announced programs while impersonating members of The Go-Go's.

== Career ==
=== 1981–1984: Q, SSQ and Playback ===
In 1981, Swain was introduced to Jon St. James, the proprietor of Fullerton's Casbah Recording Studio, which hosted recordings for the bands Berlin and Social Distortion.

Jon was a big fan of synth bands like Kraftwerk and M; when he met Stacey Swain in 1981, he knew right away that this impossibly stylish former Ringling Bros. elephant girl and veteran of the Disney Main Street parade possessed star qualities perfectly compatible with electronic music, a genre Stacey also adored. She was enamored of the obscure Japanese band The Plastics and The B-52's, and simply could not get over David Bowie. As a student of style, Swain could literally turn rags into a fashion statement. On one occasion she went to the renaissance fair in Agoura dressed simply in two large pieces of soft leather she bought from a shop in Anaheim.

St. James was developing a synthpop group called Q, named after the James Bond character. The band consisted of St. James on guitars, and Dan Van Patten and John Van Tongeren on vocoder and synthesizer. She served as the assistant producer on the band's four tracks for The Q EP when St. James realized they needed a vocalist for their first track "Sushi", which Swain provided as she had previously recorded demos at his studio. She then became the lead singer for Q, although at that time, she still considered herself more of a dancer than a singer.

In 1981, Q (the original project) was Jon, Dan and myself hence Jon Q, Dan Q and Stacey Q. Q, the original name of the project, references James Bond and the scientist responsible for all his high-tech gadgets.

The Q EP received little airplay except on college radio. Its success led St. James and Swain to develop more songs. In 1982, the group added drummer Karl Moet and synth player Rich West, but had to change their name because of copyright issues when producer Quincy Jones reportedly had "established use of the 'Q' moniker". They renamed the band SSQ, which was inspired partly by a fishing endeavor where St. James "was fishing in a lake 'no bigger than a bathtub' and made a joke that the boat was the 'S.S. Q,'" and also that "SS" stood for Stacey Swain. SSQ released their debut album Playback in 1983 under Enigma Records, which featured the single "Synthicide" that was also made into a music video.

=== 1985–1987: Breakthrough, Stacey Q and Better Than Heaven ===
In 1985, Swain signed a recording contract with Columbia Records. Using Stacey Q as her moniker for solo works, she released her debut single "Shy Girl". Her eponymous album later was distributed in cassette format to limited release. The album contained an early version of "Two of Hearts", which originally was released and performed by Sue Gatlin. After her singles collectively sold several thousand copies, she signed with Atlantic Records with St. James as manager and the other members of SSQ as backup musicians. That same year, the band would perform the song "Tonight (We'll Make Love Until We Die)" for the hit horror-comedy film, The Return of The Living Dead.

She recorded the album Better Than Heaven in three weeks. Its title track was co-written by Berlin, "He Doesn't Understand" was written by Rusty Anderson, and "We Connect" was written by Willie Wilcox of Utopia "Two of Hearts", its lead single, received substantial radio airplay, along with its music video on MTV, in the latter half of 1986. It reached number 3 on the Billboard Hot 100 chart, and the top 10 in several other countries. The album reached number 59 on the US album chart. "Two of Hearts" briefly was considered for a "Weird Al" Yankovic parody, but the songwriters declined. She went on a U.S. and European club tour.

The success of "Two of Hearts" led Swain to television appearances on talk shows as well as guest panel appearances on game shows The Gong Show and The New Hollywood Squares She appeared as the character Cinnamon in the episode "Off-Broadway Baby" of the NBC sitcom The Facts of Life where she performed "Two of Hearts". In a follow-up episode, "A Star Is Torn", she performed "We Connect". Cast regular George Clooney made his farewell appearance when his character decides to join Cinnamon as a roadie.

=== 1988–1992: Hard Machine and Nights Like This ===
Swain released Hard Machine, the second Stacey Q album, in 1988. She changed her hair color from blond to red, and adopted a punk rock-influenced appearance. The album had other producers besides St. James, resulting in a different musical direction. The single "Don't Make a Fool of Yourself" peaked at number 66 on the US Hot 100, with a remix by Shep Pettibone making the top five on the Hot Dance Chart. The single was featured in the Full House episode "D.J. Tanner's Day Off", where she briefly appeared as Stacey Q. The songs "The River" and "Another Chance" were featured in the cult action film One Man Force, where she also had an appearance.

Nights Like This was her third and final album with Atlantic. Released in 1989, it also marked SSQ's last participation. Its first single was "Give You All My Love," and "Heartbeat", its second single, featured backing vocals by Timothy B. Schmit of the Eagles. Its title track featured backing vocals by The Weather Girls. The musical style involved more experimenting with instruments such as Kawai keyboards. She promoted the album with another national tour at various clubs. On television, she appeared in an episode of Mama's Family in which she was a member of an all-female band called The Bonecrushers.

=== 1993–1997: Stacey Q's Greatest Hits and Boomerang ===
In 1993, Swain released the single "Too Hot for Love" under the independent label Thump Records. The single was structured toward an early-1990s dance sound and featured sexually suggestive lyrics, representing another change in direction for the artist. Thump also gathered material from her first Atlantic Records album as well as tracks from Q and SSQ that never had been released on CD into a 1995 compilation album, Stacey Q's Greatest Hits. Most of the tracks were either remixed or re-edited entirely from their original versions in an attempt to modernize them.

In the mid-1990s, Swain traveled to Tibet, where she was introduced to the monastic dance and song of the Far East. She also lived in Nepal where she studied at monasteries with Buddhist lamas and was trained in the ancient art of cham dance.

In 1997, Swain released the album Boomerang, which reflected her experiences in Tibet, as well as her conversion to Buddhism. She also released a cover of a Janis Ian tune called "Tenderness", which reached number 5 on the Jamaican charts.

=== 1998–2022: Other projects and hiatus ===
Swain continued to be involved in various music and acting projects. She appeared in a gay-themed art film called Citizens of Perpetual Indulgence, and had a "special non-sexual appearance" in Playing the Odds. She collaborated with director Geoffrey Karen Dior on the compilation album Porn to Rock and Dior's 2001 album S E X. In 2000, she played the lead female character Yeshe Tsogyal in a production of The Life of Padmasambhava by the San Francisco-based Namsay Dorje Theater Company. In 2002, Swain appeared in the "Identity Parade" round of the BBC2 game show Never Mind the Buzzcocks. She provided vocals for "Hear The Feeling", a 2003 single by Divine Frequency (Simply Jeff), that was used for the soundtrack of a documentary on raves. She was the voice of Karin Kikuhara in the English-language version of Stratos 4, a Japanese anime series. She provided vocals on the debut album of the Echo Junkies, a duo of former SSQ bandmates Jon St. James and Skip Hahn.

Thump Records released another Stacey Q compilation in 2007. Queen of the 80s contained original versions of many of her solo songs as well as songs by Q and SSQ. In November 2008, she appeared on CBS's The Early Show as part of the show's 1980s flashback segment where she sang "Two of Hearts".

In 2008, Swain provided guest vocals for Hydra Productions, a songwriting duo consisting of Shawn Winstian and Shane Condo. Liquid, their debut album, featured appearances by dance-pop artists of the 1980s, also including Tiffany and Gioia Bruno of Exposé.

In September 2022, Stacey's Better Than Heaven album was re-released with bonus tracks and remixes.

== Discography ==
Solo studio albums

- Better Than Heaven (1986)
- Hard Machine (1988)
- Nights Like This (1989)
- Boomerang (1997)
- Color Me Cinnamon (2010)

SSQ

- Playback (1983)
- Jet Town Je t’aime (2020)

== Filmography ==
Year	Film	Role	Notes
1985	Cavegirl	Brenda	
1986–87	The Facts of Life	Cinnamon	Eps. "Off-Broadway Baby", "A Star Is Torn"
1987, 1989	The New Hollywood Squares	Stacey Q	Celebrity guest, 3 episodes
1988	Full House	Herself	Ep: "D.J. Tanner's Day Off"
1989	Mama's Family	Ciji	Ep: "Bubba's House Band"
1989	One Man Force	Leah Jennings	
1998	Playing the Odds	Chinese Food Delivery Woman	
2000	Citizens of Perpetual Indulgence	Stacey	
2002	Never Mind the Buzzcocks		Episode 1.3, 18 March 2002
2003	Stratos 4	Karin Kikuhara	first voiceover role in anime dub
2011	RuPaul's Drag U	Herself/Makeover model	Episode: "80's Ladies"
