= Better Than Heaven =

Studio album by Stacey Q
- Released: October 17, 1986
- Recorded: December 1985 – September 1986
- Studios: Formula 1, La Habra, California; Atlantic Studios, New York City
- Genres: Dance-pop; Hi-NRG; freestyle; new wave
- Length: 39:46
- Label: Atlantic
- Producer: Jon St. James

Stacey Q chronology
Stacey Q (1985)	Better Than Heaven (1986)	Hard Machine (1988)

Singles from Better Than Heaven
- 1. "Two of Hearts" Released: June 13, 1986; 2. "We Connect" Released: November 28, 1986; 3. "Insecurity" Released: April 3, 1987; 4. "Music Out of Bounds" Released: September 18, 1987

Professional ratings
Review scores
Source	Rating
AllMusic	3/5 stars

Better Than Heaven is the debut studio album by American singer Stacey Q, released on October 17, 1986, by Atlantic Records. Produced by Jon St. James, Better Than Heaven is predominantly a dance-pop album with elements of Hi-NRG, freestyle and new wave music. She collaborated with the same line-up of musicians with whom she had previously performed in the band SSQ. They later continued to work on her other solo albums, Hard Machine (1988) and Nights Like This (1989).

Released during the rise of popularity of the lead single, "Two of Hearts", Better Than Heaven received generally positive reviews from music critics and peaked at number 59 on the Billboard 200.

Three singles from the album were released. "Two of Hearts" peaked at number three on the Billboard Hot 100 and also did well on the Hot Dance Club Songs, landing at number four. It became one of the highest-selling singles of 1986, selling over one million copies. The second single, "We Connect", was also successful in charts, peaking at number 35 on the Billboard Hot 100 and number 14 on the Hot Dance Club Songs. Stacey Q performed both songs on the television series The Facts of Life where she guest starred as Cinnamon, an aspiring singer.

On 16 September 2022, "Better Than Heaven" was re-released with bonus remixes and extra tracks through Cherry Pop Records.

== Track listing ==
No.	Title	Writer(s)	Length
1.	"Two of Hearts"	John Mitchell; Tim Greene; Sue Gatlin	3:59
2.	"We Connect"	Willie Wilcox	4:14
3.	"Insecurity"	Rich West	3:31
4.	"Better Than Heaven"	J.P. Charles; Mark Holding; Chris Ruiz-Valesco	3:33
5.	"Don't Let Me Down"	Karl Moet; Jon St. James	3:53
6.	"Music Out of Bounds"	St. James; West; Skip Hahn; Stacey Swain	4:24
7.	"Love or Desire"	St. James	3:46
8.	"Don't Break My Heart"	St. James; Swain	3:33
9.	"He Doesn't Understand"	Rusty Anderson	5:07
10.	"Dancing Nowhere"	St. James; Swain	3:46
Total length:			39:46

== Credits and personnel ==
=== SSQ ===
- Stacey Q
- Skip Hahn
- Karl Moet
- Rich West
- Jon St. James

=== Production ===
- Frank Del Rio - associate producer (track 7)
- William J. Walker - associate producer (track 1)
- Jeff C. Fishman - associate producer (track 1)
- Willie Wilcox - associate producer (track 2), additional synth programming
- Keith Cowen - production coordinator
- Kirk Henry - production assistance
- Nancy Wendland - production assistance
- Keith Zajic - production assistance
- Gary Mraz - additional synth programming
- Dave Sitz - additional synth programming
- Dave Guccione - additional synth programming
- Aaron Rapoport - photography
- Danny Mendellin - hair & make-up
- Ed Jensen - hair & make-up
- Charlotte McGinnes - hair & make-up
- Tish & Gina - band stylists
- Jodi Rovin - design
- Barry Diament - CD mastering

== Charts and certifications ==
Chart (1986/87)	Peak position
Australia (Kent Music Report)	36
U.S. Billboard 200	59
U.S. Top R&B/Hip-Hop Albums	46
