= Jon St. James =

American songwriter/producer

- Birth name: Jon Willoughby
- Genres: Rock, synthpop, electronic
- Instrument(s): Guitar, electronic devices, drums
- Years active: 1977–present

Jon St. James is an American guitarist, songwriter–composer, producer and recording engineer. His Casbah Recording Studio was a part of Orange County, California's new music scene in the late 1970s and early to mid-1980s. St. James' first album was as leader–frontman–songwriter of the progressive rock group French Lick. St James was a pioneer of techno pop and dance music, using Moog synthesizers, electronic effects, and tape loops. St. James lived in France for two years, studying Musique concrète with French composers.

There he first used Revox A77 tape machines to create ambient electronic textures. Upon returning from France, St. James started the electronic pop group Q with Stacey Swain (Stacey Q), Dan Van Patten from Berlin and John Van Tongeren. Q released one single, "Playback", on Cocteau Records, which was co-owned by Bill Nelson of Bebop Deluxe fame. Q also released a self-titled EP on red vinyl in the US on M.A.O. Records in 1982. Q later became SSQ and signed with EMI America Records on the heels of St. James' recording the first Berlin album Pleasure Victim. EMI signed St. James to a six-record solo deal. The first single off St. James' solo album "Trans-Atlantic" was to be "The Girl Who Seduced the World", which David Bowie wanted for his album Let's Dance. However, EMI America closed its doors almost immediately after the release of the SSQ and Jon St. James albums. St. James continued to do TV and movie work. He and Swain regrouped as Stacey Q in 1984 and released "Two of Hearts", which became a worldwide pop hit on Atlantic Records.

== Career ==
As a producer and engineer, St. James led several influential recording projects beginning in the 1980s, including records by punk bands The Vandals and Social Distortion, as well as the new wave band Berlin.

As a songwriter, guitarist, and producer, St. James helped to bring the talents of techno-pop diva Stacey Q, the dance-pop duo Bardeux, and the dance-pop artist Katalina to a wide audience. In addition, St. James has provided musical soundtracks for television and radio, including projects for TV's St. Elsewhere, Hill Street Blues, Malcolm in the Middle and Dawson's Creek, among others.

St. James moved into artist management and had his first double platinum hit with Candyman's "Knockin' Boots" on Epic Records. St. James produced and managed the careers of several more Epic acts including the synthpop acts Anything Box and Red Flag. St. James often played guitar, synth, and programming for new talent. He also produced for Enigma/Restless Records and for a time had his own label Synthecide, named after the SSQ song.

Early projects included sound-alike promos for Los Angeles radio station KMET, an album of electronic music with a space navigation theme, and a four-song EP featuring Stacey Swain.

The Casbah attracted a variety of talent, including The Righteous Brothers keyboardist and session musician John Van Tongeren, Berlin drummer, synthesist and producer Dan Van Patten, Agent Orange, Minutemen, The Adolescents, rockabilly artists Rocky Burnette, Rip Masters, and Christian glam rockers Stryper. After the success of Stacey Q's Better Than Heaven album, St. James sold the Casbah to members of Social Distortion and opened the new Formula 1 studio in La Habra. F1, as the studio is known, has hosted a wide variety of acts, including Allan Holdsworth, Rusty Anderson, Los Angeles guitarist Dale Hauskins of the Swiss progressive rock band Flame Dream, The Vandals, Blink-182, Warren Fitzgerald, Josh Freese, Bleeding Through, Jon Anderson of Yes, No Doubt, and Tenacious D.

St. James sold his F1 studio to Thump Records, a Lowrider magazine-financed record label, for which St. James produced many artists. Since then he built a new personal studio where he has continued to record, write, and produce. Recent clients include Kung Fu Records, The Warped Tour, The Used, Mike Ness, Warren Fitzgerald, and Jason Freese of Green Day. St. James continues to develop young talent, such as the singer, songwriter and producer Andy Carpenter. As of 2022, Jon has most recently produced an EP titled "Berserker of None" by upcoming hardcore/metalcore band from Southern California by the name of Atrocitvs.

== Discography ==
- Trans-Atlantic (EMI America; 1984)
- Fast Impressions (Enigma; 1986)
