= How Did I Find Myself Here? =

Album by The Dream Syndicate

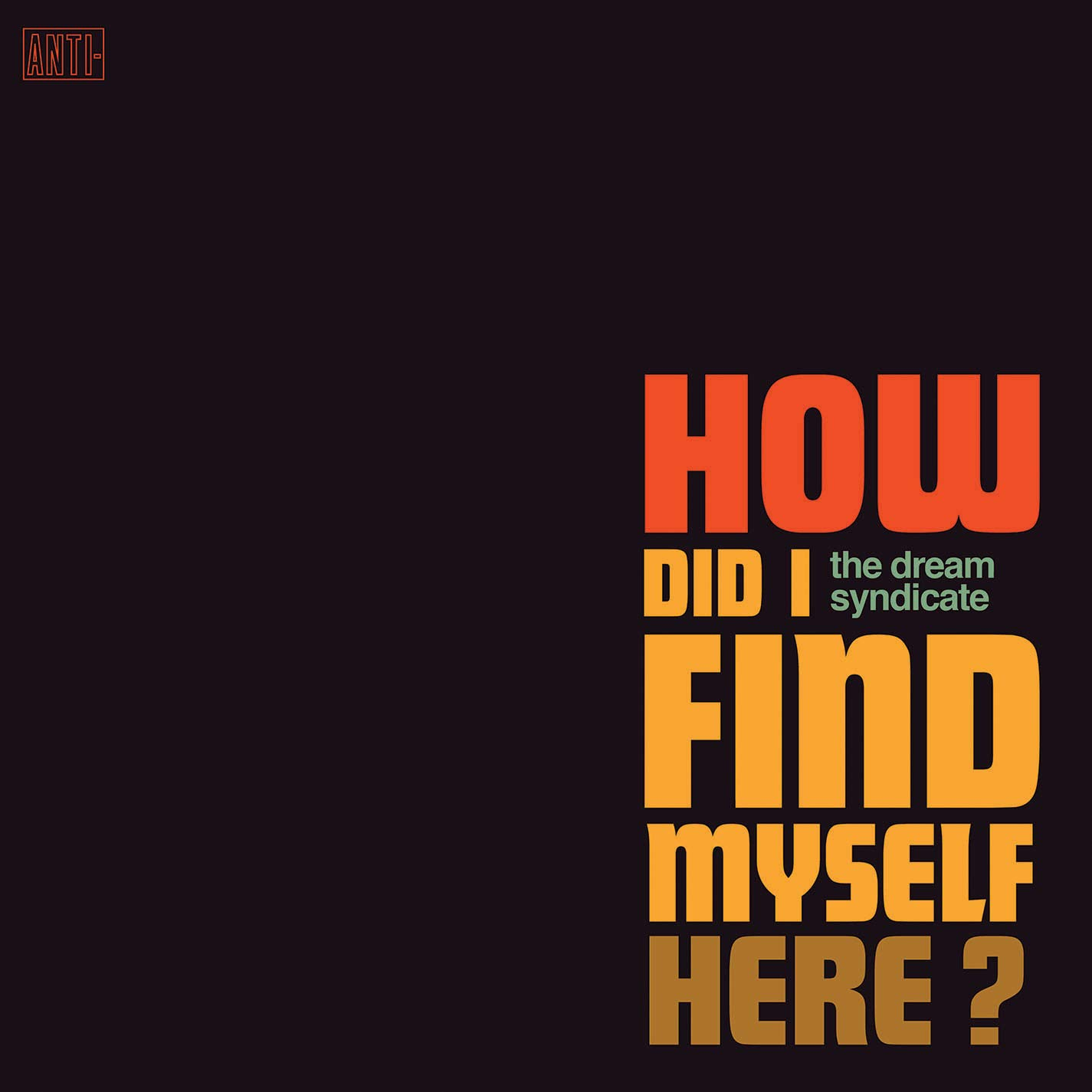

Studio album by the Dream Syndicate
- Released: September 8, 2017
- Genres: Alternative rock, neo-psychedelia
- Length: 45:48
- Label: ANTI-
- Producers: The Dream Syndicate and Chris Cacavas

The Dream Syndicate chronology
Ghost Stories (1988)	How Did I Find Myself Here? (2017)	These Times (2019)

How Did I Find Myself Here? is the fifth studio album by American alternative rock band the Dream Syndicate. It was released on September 8, 2017, almost 30 years after the band's last album, and after three years of touring. The recording band included front man Steve Wynn and former band members, as well as a collaborator on Wynn's side projects.

== Background ==
How Did I Find Myself Here? is the first studio album by the Dream Syndicate in almost thirty years. The group broke up in 1988, after Ghost Stories failed to achieve success, but Wynn reformed the group in 2012, with the help of original drummer Dennis Duck, bassist Mark Walton, Dream Syndicate member since 1984's Medicine Show, and guitarist Jason Victor, a former collaborator of Wynn's (including in the project Steve Wynn & the Miracle 3). The band toured for three years, including two dates in Atlanta where they played The Days of Wine and Roses and Medicine Show in sequence. With keyboard player Chris Cacavas, they recorded How Did I Find Myself Here?, which was released in 2017 on Anti-.

Former Dream Syndicate bassist and singer Kendra Smith, one of the band's founding members, sings on "Kendra's Dream", the album's final song. Linda Pitmon (who is married to Wynn) plays percussion on two songs; she had played on some of Wynn's other projects before.

Critics commented on the connections between the new album and the older material, and so did Wynn. In a 2019 interview he said the album was "kind of a rebirth", "a bridge to the past", which had "enough referential points to who we were before but also led us to a new place". The band followed the album by six months of touring, including a series of dates in Europe, in the fall of 2017.

== Reception ==
The record was praised by many critics and received positive reviews in Slant Magazine, PopMatters, and on Pitchfork.

Jeremy Winograd, in Slant, wrote that the record "effortlessly recalls the band's much-too-short original run while also settling into a lived-in, comfortable groove"; the songs are "noisy, heavy, and cantankerous", and the band pushes itself further in the longer songs than they did on earlier albums. Winograd does miss original guitarist Karl Precoda; Victor, he says, is more conventional though he "acquits himself well".

While critics compare the album to previous ones, Ed Whitelock, for PopMatters, adds a twist: the album "doesn't sound like any of the old Dream Syndicate records, which is something that can be said, actually, of each of the previous Dream Syndicate records." After three years of touring, Whitelock said, the band sounded "tight and possibly more cohesive when entering the studio than any unit previously recording under the name." The band was "confident and playful", and while the songs were unique in themselves, together they made a very cohesive album.

David Chiu, writing for Pitchfork, said that "Wynn, Duck, and Walton sound revitalized"; he noted how in many ways the album reached back to the early Dream Syndicate catalog, with Kendra Smith singing, with Victor's "serrated guitar playing" that recalls the playing of Precoda and Paul B. Cutler, and with some songs "reflective" and "melancholic" like the older material. At the same time Chiu saw differences as well, particularly in the "epic" title track, which "represents a stylistic departure with its slow and trippy mix of funk, jazz, and Stax-influenced R&B."

== Track listing ==
From the liner notes:
No.	Title	Length
1.	"Filter Me Through You"	3:54
2.	"Glide"	6:23
3.	"Out of My Head"	4:10
4.	"80 West"	4:15
5.	"Like Mary"	4:57
6.	"The Circle"	4:34
7.	"How Did I Find Myself Here?"	11:13
8.	"Kendra's Dream"	6:22

== Personnel ==
Adapted from the liner notes:

- Steve Wynn - lead vocals, guitar
- Jason Victor - guitar, backing vocals
- Mark Walton - bass guitar
- Dennis Duck - drums
- Kendra Smith - lead vocals ("Kendra's Dream")
- Chris Cacavas - keyboards
- Linda Pitmon - backing vocals, percussion ("Filter Me Through You" and "How Did I Find Myself Here?")

=== Production and recording ===
- Produced by the Dream Syndicate and Chris Cacavas
- Recorded at Montrose Studios (Richmond, VA), by Adrian Olson; assisted by Bruce Olsen
- Mixed at Water Music (Hoboken, NY), by John Agnello
- Mastered at Sterling Sound Studios, by Greg Calbi
