= Autopsy (45 Grave album) =

Compilation album by 45 Grave
- Released: 1987
- Genre: Deathrock, horror punk
- Label: Enigma

45 Grave chronology
Sleep in Safety (1981)	Autopsy (1987)	Only the Good Die Young (1989)

Professional ratings
Review scores
Source	Rating
Allmusic	3/5 stars

Autopsy is a compilation album by 45 Grave, released in 1987 by Enigma Records. Recorded in the band's early days, it contains previously unreleased songs (many originally written and recorded by guitarist Paul B. Cutler's first band, the Consumers) and alternate versions of tracks that were later rerecorded on the band's 1984 debut album, Sleep in Safety. Also included was the previously released 1981 single "Black Cross" and its B-side "Wax."

== Track listing ==
1. "The Plan" - 2:03
2. "Take 9" - 1:31
3. "Anti-Anti-Anti" - 1:56
4. "Concerned Citizen" - 1:52
5. "Consumers" - 1:39
6. "My Type" - 1:27
7. "Eye" - 1:43
8. "Your Problem" - 1:27
9. "Anti-Em" - 2:00
10. "Dream Hits" - 1:50
11. "Partytime" - 2:47
12. "Surf Bat" - 2:00
13. "Choices" - 2:29
14. "Wax" - 4:38
15. "Black Cross" 3:02
16. "Riboflavin-Flavoured, Non-Carbonated, Polyunsaturated Blood" - 2:39

=== Track information ===
- "Dream Hits", "Partytime" and "Surf Bat" are earlier versions of tracks that were later rerecorded for Sleep in Safety ("Dream Hits" was retitled "Dream Hits II" on that album).
- "Riboflavin-Flavoured, Non-Carbonated, Polyunsaturated Blood" is a cover version of the 1964 novelty song originally performed by Don Hinson and the Rigamorticians; it was later rerecorded as "Riboflavin" on Sleep in Safety.
- "Anti-Anti-Anti", "Concerned Citizen", "Consumers", "My Type", "Your Problem" and "Dream Hits" were originally written and recorded by the Consumers.

=== Personnel ===
- Dinah Cancer - vocals
- Paul B. Cutler - lead guitar, backing vocals, keyboards
- Paul Roessler - keyboards, backing vocals
- Rob Graves - bass, backing vocals
- Don Bolles - drums, backing vocals
- Pat Smear - guitar on “Wax”
- Edward Colver - Photographer

== Black Cross ==
"Black Cross" is 45 Grave's debut single, released in 1981 on Goldar Records. It and B-side "Wax" were not featured on their 1984 debut album, Sleep in Safety, but were both later included on the Autopsy collection, and remained staples of their live performances. Former Germs guitarist Pat Smear plays additional guitar on the B-side of the single.

"Black Cross" was covered by alternative rock band Red Hot Chili Peppers on their Live in Hyde Park album.

=== Track listing ===
==== Side A ====
1. "Black Cross" - 3:00

==== Side B ====
1. "Wax" – 4:30
