= The Return of the Living Dead (soundtrack) =

Soundtrack album by Various artists
- Released: 1985
- Genre: Film score; punk rock; horror punk; psychobilly
- Length: 34:38
- Label: Enigma
- Producer: The Cramps; Michael Wagener; Ron Goudie; Chris Gray; T.S.O.L.; Chris D.; Duane Aslaksen; The Damned; Herb Fenstein; Tall Boys; The Jet Black Berries; Jon St. James

Professional ratings
Review scores
Source	Rating
AllMusic	4/5 stars

The Return of the Living Dead is the original soundtrack from the film of the same name, released in 1985 by Enigma Records. The film itself is a horror comedy film written and directed by Dan O'Bannon about a group of teenage punks dealing with a horde of brain-hungry zombies.

The soundtrack features classic punk rock, horror punk/death rock, psychobilly songs by groups like the Cramps, 45 Grave, T.S.O.L., the Damned and the Flesh Eaters.

The soundtrack has undergone numerous releases in different countries.

A limited vinyl edition was released in 2016.

== Reception ==
John Leland of Spin wrote, "All of the songs deal with death—though usually not the kind that prevents you from living a normal, active life, The tunes range from the bad to the bad, encompassing all shades of meaning of the word."

== Track listing ==
Side one
No.	Title	Writer(s)	Performer	Length
1.	"Surfin' Dead"	Ivy Rorschach, Lux Interior	The Cramps	4:11
2.	"Partytime (Zombie Version)"	Paul B. Cutler; Dinah Cancer; Don Bolles	45 Grave	2:48
3.	"Nothing for You"	T.S.O.L.	T.S.O.L.	2:24
4.	"Eyes Without a Face"	Chris Desjardins; Don Kirk; Robyn Jameson; Chris Wahl	The Flesh Eaters	3:12
5.	"Burn the Flames"	Erickson	Roky Erickson	6:00

Side two
No.	Title	Writer(s)	Performer	Length
1.	"Dead Beat Dance"	The Damned	The Damned	3:51
2.	"Take a Walk"	Nigel Lewis, Mark Robertson	Tall Boys	2:28
3.	"Love Under Will"	Gary Trainer	Jet Black Berries	2:56
4.	"Tonight (We'll Make Love Until We Die)"	Stacey Swain, Jon St. James	SSQ	3:37
5.	"Trash's Theme"	St. James	SSQ	2:55

== Other musical credits ==
1. Francis Haines, "The Trioxin Theme" (Main title)
2. The F.U.'s, "Young, Fast Iranians" : 1991 Hemdale version and subsequent DVD and Blu-ray Releases, though not on official soundtrack album.
3. 45 Grave, "Partytime (Single Version)": version actually used in the film, though not on official soundtrack album.
4. Norbert Schultze, "Panzer Rollen in Afrika vor": song playing on Ernie's walkman, though not on official soundtrack album.

== Personnel ==
- Cover (Album Cover Design) – Brian Ayuso;
- Mastered By – Eddy Schreyer;
- Producer (Executive Soundtrack Album Production) – Budd Carr;
- Producer (Soundtrack Album Production) – Steve Pross, William Hein;

== Releases ==
- The Return Of The Living Dead (Original Motion Picture Soundtrack), (LP, Album), Enigma Records, US 1985.
- Le Retour Des Morts Vivants "The Return Of The Living Dead", (LP, Pic, Comp), New Rose Records, France 1985.
- Le Retour Des Morts Vivants (The Return Of The Living Dead), (LP, Comp), New Rose Records, France, 1985.
- The Return Of The Living Dead OST, (Cass, Album), Big Beat Records, UK, 1985.
- The Return Of The Living Dead (Original Motion Picture Soundtrack), (CD, Album), Big Beat Records, UK, 1985.
- The Return Of The Living Dead (Original Motion Picture Soundtrack), (CD, Album, Comp), Metal Blade Records, Restless Records, US, 1985.
- The Return Of The Living Dead (Original Motion Picture Soundtrack), (Cass, Album) Enigma Records US 1985.
- The Return Of The Living Dead (Original Motion Picture Soundtrack), (Cass, Album, Comp) Enigma Records New Zealand 1985.
- The Return Of The Living Dead (Original Motion Picture Soundtrack), (LP, Album) Big Beat Records 1985.
- The Return Of The Living Dead (Original Motion Picture Soundtrack), (LP, Album), Enigma Records, Big Time, New Zealand, 1985.
- The Return Of The Living Dead (Original Motion Picture Soundtrack), (LP, Comp), Big Beat Records, UK, 1985.
- The Return Of The Living Dead (Original Motion Picture Soundtrack), (LP, Comp, W/Lbl), Big Beat Records, UK, 1985.
- The Return Of The Living Dead (Original Motion Picture Soundtrack), (LP, Ltd, Pic), Enigma Records, US, 1985.
- The Return Of The Living Dead (Original Soundtrack), (LP, Album) Enigma Records 2004, Netherlands, 1985.
- Various – Le Retour Des Morts Vivants (The Return Of The Living Dead), (LP, Comp, TP), New Rose Records, France, 1985.
- Battalion / The Return Of The Living Dead - Original Soundtrack, (LP, Album), Victor, Japan 1986.
- The Return Of The Living Dead (Original Motion Picture Soundtrack), (LP, Album), Enigma Records, Spain, 1986.
- Battalion / The Return Of The Living Dead - Original Soundtrack, (CD, Album, RM), Victor, Japan, 1987.
- The Return Of The Living Dead (Original Motion Picture Soundtrack), (CD), Enigma Records, US, 1987.
- The Return Of The Living Dead (Original Soundtrack), (LP, Album, Ltd, RE, Bla), Real Gone Music, 2016.

== The making of the soundtrack - Blu-ray bonus features (2016) ==
Blu-ray review: The Return of the Living Dead: Collector's Edition

- "Party Time: The Music of The Return Of The Living Dead" (Expanded Version) (30 minutes), with Music Consultants Budd Carr, Steve Pross and Soundtrack Artists: Dinah Cancer (45 Grave), Chris D (The Flesh Eaters), Roky Erickson, Karl Moet (SSQ), Joe Wood (T.S.O.L.), Mark Robertson (Tall Boys). Also featuring musicians: Greg Hetson (Circle Jerks) and John Sox (The F.U.'s, Straw Dogs) — As mentioned, the soundtrack for the film is a loving ode to 1980s punk rock, and some of its stalwarts look back at the process of getting on the soundtrack.

== See also ==
- Night of the Living Dead (film series)
