= Dinah Cancer and the Grave Robbers =

Dinah Cancer and the Grave Robbers are a renewed version of classic deathrock band, 45 Grave. After 45 Grave disbanded, frontwoman Dinah Cancer and bandmember Lisa Pifer formed "Dinah Cancer and the Grave Robbers", continuing in the style of 45 Grave.

== Band members ==
- Dinah Cancer: Vocals
- Daniel De Leon: Guitar/Vocals
- Lisa Pifer: Bass/Vocals
- Hal Satan: Drums
