= Return of the Living Dead =

Return of the Living Dead may refer to:

- Return of the Living Dead (film series), film series deriving from the 1985 film
  - The Return of the Living Dead, a 1985 comedy-horror film, spin-off of the film Night of the Living Dead
    - The Return of the Living Dead (soundtrack), 1985 soundtrack album to the eponymous film
  - Return of the Living Dead (upcoming film), a horror film and the sixth film in the film series
- "Return of the Living Dead", a song by Wednesday 13 from the 2008 album Bloodwork (EP)
- Return of the Living Dead, a 1998 album by E.S.G. (rapper)

== See also ==
- Night of the Living Dead (film series)
- The Return of the Living Dead Boys, a 1987 album by Dead Boys
