= Sleep in Safety =

Album by 45 Grave

Studio album by 45 Grave
- Released: 1983
- Recorded: Capitol (Hollywood)
- Genre: Deathrock, horror punk
- Length: 41:47
- Label: Enigma
- Producer: Craig Leon, Paul B. Cutler

45 Grave chronology
Sleep in Safety (1983)	Phantoms (1983)

Sleep in Safety is the first studio album by American horror rock band 45 Grave. It was released in 1983 on record label Enigma. The album attempted to bring 45 Grave to a wider audience, crossing over from the band’s punk and deathrock roots with forays into heavy metal with a cover of “School's Out" by Alice Cooper and the song “Partytime”, which later featured in the 1985 film The Return of the Living Dead.

== Critical reception ==
Professional ratings
Review scores
Source	Rating
AllMusic	4.5/5 stars

Retrospective critical reception of the album has been generally positive. Ned Raggett of AllMusic praised the album. Trouser Press wrote that the album "contains most of their best songs", calling it "consistently creepy". Spin, on the other hand, opined that the album "never escapes Christian Death's shadow".

== Track listing ==
1983 vinyl release

All tracks are written by 45 Grave (Dinah Cancer, Paul Cutler and Don Bolles), except as noted.

Side A
No.	Title	Writer(s)	Length
1.	"Insurance from God"		5:03
2.	"Evil"	Cancer, Bolles, Cutler, Rob Graves	2:52
3.	"Partytime"		3:16
4.	"Dream Hits II"	Cancer, Cutler	1:48
5.	"Slice o' Life"	Bolles, Cutler	6:08

Side B
No.	Title	Writer(s)	Length
1.	"45 Grave"		3:30
2.	"Phantoms"		3:55
3.	"Violent World"	Rev. Mikey Borens	2:05
4.	"Bad Love"	Cancer, Cutler	2:45
5.	"Surf Bat"	Cutler	1:17
6.	"Procession"		5:16

1993 remastered CD bonus tracks

All tracks are written by 45 Grave (Dinah Cancer, Paul Cutler and Don Bolles), except as noted.

No.	Title	Writer(s)	Length
12.	"Riboflavin"		2:54
13.	"School's Out"	Alice Cooper	3:33
14.	"Partytime" (Single Version)		3:06

== Personnel ==
- Dinah Cancer — vocals
- Paul B. Cutler — guitar, keyboards, vocals, co-production
- Rob Graves — bass
- Don Bolles — drums
- Paul Roessler — keyboards
- Craig Leon – co-production
