= The Consumers =

American punk rock band from Phoenix, Arizona, US

- Origin: Phoenix, Arizona, United States
- Genre: Punk rock
- Years active: 1977–1978
- Label: In the Red Recordings
- Past members: David Wiley; Paul B. Cutler; Greg Jones; Mikey Borens; Jim Allen; John "Johnny Precious" Vivier

The Consumers were the first American punk rock band from Phoenix, Arizona, United States, but their members quickly relocated to Los Angeles, and became involved with the then-burgeoning L.A. punk scene.

== History ==
The Consumers formed in Phoenix in 1977, with David Wiley on vocals, Paul Cutler and Greg Jones on guitar, Mikey Borens on bass, and Jim Allen on drums (the latter was soon replaced by Johnny Precious, formerly of another early Phoenix punk band, The Liars). Cutler and Borens were already accomplished musicians, heavily influenced by avant-garde music and art, which they then merged with punk's rage. A hostile reception by the Phoenix club scene often resulted in a violent aftermath after the band's live performances, and after approximately a year of frustration, the group relocated to Los Angeles early in 1978.

Arriving in L.A., the band hit it off with the "Pasadena Mafia" (an informal moniker for Pasadena groups the Los Angeles Free Music Society and Bpeople), but were only coolly received by the Los Angeles punk rock crowd. During a performance at The Whisky, Cutler got into a scuffle with Kim Fowley and his entourage. The band responded the following night by performing, as their entire set, a psychedelic interpretation of "Alley Oop", a song that Fowley had produced in the 1960s. The Consumers came to an end when Jones decided to move back to Phoenix in late 1978.

Only one recording of the band exists, from 1977. An entire album's worth of tracks were recorded in eight hours with the assistance of Cutler's friend Joey Dears, using studio time that Dears had accumulated working at a Phoenix studio. It was released posthumously in 1995 as All My Friends Are Dead.

Cutler went on to form Vox Pop, and then 45 Grave, the latter of which incorporated many Consumers songs into their set list.

In 1982, Cutler engineered and produced the debut EP by The Dream Syndicate, and later joined the band on guitar for their final two albums, Out of the Grey (1986) and Ghost Stories (1988), before their 1989 demise.

Borens went on to work with Cutler in 45 Grave, as well as with The Romans, Chris Cacavas and Cathedral of Tears. He died in 2016.

Wiley started working with other musicians from the Pasadena Mafia and LAFMS circles, and formed Human Hands, a group at the core of L.A.'s art punk and "Associated Skull Bands" scenes. Wiley died in 1986.

Allen went on to play and record with a short-lived but locally popular Phoenix power pop band, Blue Shoes.

Vivier went on to play with The Feederz, Vox Pop and Killer Pussy. He died in 1985.

== Members ==
Former members

David Wiley – vocals (1977–1978)
Paul B. Cutler – guitar (1977–1978)
Greg Jones – guitar (1977–1978)
Mikey Borens – bass (1977–1978)
Jim Allen – drums (1977)
John "Johnny Precious" Vivier – drums (1977–1978)

== Discography ==
=== Studio albums ===
- All My Friends Are Dead (1995, In the Red Recordings)
