= Partytime (song) =

Song by 45 Grave

Single by 45 Grave

from the album Sleep in Safety
- A-side: "School's Out"
- B-side: "Partytime (The Story of Sabine)"
- Released: 1984
- Genre: Punk rock Deathrock
- Length: 3:06
- Songwriters: D. Bolles, D. Cancer

45 Grave singles chronology
"Black Cross" (1981)	"Partytime" (1984)

"Partytime" is a song by 45 Grave, released as the B-side to the "School's Out" single in 1984. The song was taken from their debut album, Sleep in Safety. However, the single version, dubbed "Partytime (The Story of Sabine)", is shorter in length and notably heavier, with more smoothly flowing lyrics and a shorter introduction. This single version was included in the 1993 reissue of Sleep in Safety.

"Partytime" is probably 45 Grave's most well-known song, having been used as the theme song to the 1985 film The Return of the Living Dead and featured in the film's soundtrack. This "Zombie Version" was shorter and heavier than both previous versions of the song, and eschewed the story of the previous versions. Another version, featured on compilations Autopsy, Debasement Tapes and A Devil's Possessions, has a different vocal melody and is introduced with laughter and different lyrics.

The A-side, "School's Out," a cover of the Alice Cooper song of the same name, was featured as a bonus track on the re-released version of Sleep in Safety. This version differs little from Cooper's original, but makes use of keyboards.

== Lyrics and interpretation ==
The song is about a 5-year-old girl who is brutally raped, abused and killed by her mother and friends, and the events that followed. As Dinah Cancer explained: "It's based on a story that I read in a true crime mag. The insanity and cruelty went on. So that 'Partytime' is about child abuse but it is written as a tribute to the little girl, Sabine. The song is about what her family did to her and how she didn't deserve it".

== In popular culture ==
"Partytime" featured in Part 5 Episode 6 of The Chilling Adventures of Sabrina (2021). A rendition of it was performed by fictitious 1980s punk-metal band the Satanic Panic.

"Partytime" was notably used in the 1985 film The Return of the Living Dead, and was later used during the Call of Duty: Black Ops "Call of the Dead" trailer.

The song is also heard in the 1984 American sex comedy movie Hardbodies.

The song is heard in season 10 episode 22 "Here's Negan" of The Walking Dead

== Track listing ==
=== Side A ===
1. "School's Out" – 3:33

=== Side B ===
1. "Partytime (The Story of Sabine)" – 3:06
