= Live at Raji's =

Live album by The Dream Syndicate
- Released: 1989
- Recorded: 31 January 1988
- Genre: Alternative rock
- Label: Enigma Records; Demon Records (2004 re-release)
- Producer: Elliot Mazer

The Dream Syndicate chronology
Ghost Stories (1988)	Live at Raji's (1989)

Professional ratings
Review scores
Source	Rating
Select	3/5 medals

Live at Raji's is a live album by Los Angeles band The Dream Syndicate.

== Background ==
Containing songs from throughout the band's career, it is the last album released before the band broke up, and came out as a double album on the heels of their last studio album, Ghost Stories. The album was incorrectly reported to have been recorded after Ghost Stories; in fact, the recordings were made (straight to digital 2-track) on 31 January 1988, before Ghost Stories was recorded. The show took place at Raji's, a Los Angeles club, "in front of a delirious hometown audience".

The album was produced by Elliot Mazer, and was re-released in an expanded edition, with the original running order, in 2004. This re-release was reviewed in No Depression, the reviewer praising "Cutler's jagged, eight-legged leads" and compared the album to Neil Young's Live Rust and Warren Zevon's Stand in the Fire; "Raji's is the Syndicate's Television-meets-the-Velvet-Underground sound pushed as far as it would go. It was also the end of an era."

== Track listing ==
=== Original 1989 edition ===
1. "Still Holding on to You" (Steve Wynn) - 4:15
2. "Forest for the Trees" (Steve Wynn) - 4:25
3. "Until Lately" (Steve Wynn) - 7:09
4. "That's What You Always Say" (Steve Wynn) - 4:47
5. "Burn" (Steve Wynn) - 5:52
6. "Merrittville" (Steve Wynn) - 7:46
7. "The Days of Wine and Roses" (Steve Wynn) - 8:22
8. "The Medicine Show" (Steve Wynn) - 8:51
9. ""Halloween" (Karl Precoda) - 6:55
10. "Boston" (Steve Wynn) - 7:35
11. "John Coltrane Stereo Blues" (Karl Precoda, David Provost, Kendra Smith, Steve Wynn) - 12:11

=== 2004 edition ===
==== Disc 1 ====
1. "See That My Grave Is Kept Clean" (Blind Lemon Jefferson) - 4:53
2. "Still Holding on to You" (Steve Wynn) - 4:15
3. "Forest for the Trees" (Steve Wynn) - 4:25
4. "Until Lately" (Steve Wynn) - 7:09
5. "That's What You Always Say" (Steve Wynn) - 4:47
6. "When You Smile" (Steve Wynn) - 3:44
7. "Burn" (Steve Wynn) - 5:52
8. "All Along the Watchtower" (Bob Dylan) - 2:39
9. "Tell Me When It's Over" (Steve Wynn) - 3:52

==== Disc 2 ====
1. "Merrittville" (Steve Wynn) - 7:46
2. "The Days of Wine and Roses" (Steve Wynn) - 8:22
3. "The Medicine Show" (Steve Wynn) - 8:51
4. "Halloween" (Karl Precoda) - 6:55
5. "Boston" (Steve Wynn) - 7:35
6. "John Coltrane Stereo Blues" (Karl Precoda, David Provost, Kendra Smith, Steve Wynn) - 12:11

== Personnel ==
- Steve Wynn - vocals, guitar
- Paul B. Cutler - lead guitar
- Mark Walton - bass
- Dennis Duck - drums
- Peter Case - harmonica and noise ("John Coltrane Stereo Blues")

=== Production ===
- Elliot Mazer - production
- Steve McDonald - recording engineer
- Carlo Nuccio - house engineer
- Debbie Ashby - house assistant
- Pat Thomas - reissue production
- Jeff Lipton - reissue mastering
