= Consumer (disambiguation) =

A consumer is person or group that uses products.

Consumer or Consumers may also refer to:

- Consumer (food chain), an organism that lives off other organisms
- Consumers Distributing, a retail store chain
- The Consumers, a punk rock band active from 1977 to 1978
