= Melting in the Dark =

Studio album by Steve Wynn
- Released: 1996
- Studio: Fort Apache
- Genre: Rock, alternative rock
- Label: Zero Hour
- Producer: Steve Wynn

Steve Wynn chronology
Fluorescent (1994)	Melting in the Dark (1996)	Sweetness and Light (1997)

Melting in the Dark is an album by the American musician Steve Wynn, released in 1996. It was recorded with a band consisting of all the members of Come. Wynn supported the album by touring with a backing band that included members of Gutterball, Zuzu's Petals, and Love Tractor.

== History ==
Shortly before making the record, bassist Sean O'Brien and drummer Arthur Johnson quit Come, making this album's recording sessions the last time the original lineup of Come recorded together. Come was more familiar with Wynn's Dream Syndicate work, which in turn influenced the writing and sound of Melting in the Dark. The musicians rehearsed for a day before recording for four days. "Shelley's Blues, Pt. 2" alludes to Mike Nesmith's "Some of Shelly's Blues".

== Critical reception ==
Professional ratings
Review scores
Source	Rating
AllMusic	4/5 stars
Calgary Herald	4/5 stars
Chicago Tribune	4/4 stars
Los Angeles Times	3/4 stars
Orlando Sentinel	4/5 stars

Trouser Press wrote: "Although something of a return to the Dream Syndicate’s savage guitar-frenzy, the album is flightier, with dry, laconic vocals, jauntily aggressive tempos and a joyous garage-crud vibe that suggests it was a lot of fun to make." The Chicago Tribune called the album "spare, free-swinging rock studded with sharp hooks." The Orlando Sentinel deemed it "tense but not humorless rock."

Rolling Stone noted that "Come's clamor seems out of place next to Wynn's uninspired retrorock drawl." The Calgary Herald concluded that "Wynn remains an unheralded anti-hero, a rocker who's never been a pretender and shoulda been a contender." The Los Angeles Times determined that "it's at the midway point that Wynn's seething tales of bad love catch fire."

== Track listing ==
1. "Why"
2. "Shelley's Blues, Pt. 2"
3. "What We Call Love"
4. "Drizzle"
5. "Angels"
6. "Epilogue"
7. "Silence Is Your Only Friend"
8. "Stare It Down"
9. "Smooth"
10. "For All I Care"
11. "Way You Punish Me"
12. "Down"
13. "Melting in the Dark"

== Personnel ==
- Steve Wynn – vocals
- Thalia Zedek – guitar, backing vocals
- Chris Brokaw – guitar
- Sean O'Brien – bass
- Arthur Johnson – drums
