= Zero Hour Records =

New York City-based indie rock record label

- Founded: 1990
- Founder: Ray McKenzie
- Status: Inactive
- Distributor: Rising Tide Entertainment
- Genre: Indie rock
- Country of origin: U.S.
- Location: New York City, New York

Zero Hour Records was an indie rock record label based in New York City. It was established in 1990 by Ray McKenzie, a former phone clerk for the Chicago Mercantile Exchange. The label's first release was McKenzie's own 12" single "The Ozone Hole." In 1995, Rising Tide Entertainment, a joint venture between Doug Morris and MCA Music Entertainment, announced it would be distributing and marketing Zero Hour Records's albums. In 1997, the label opened the $300,000 mastering studio Ground Zero in SoHo, Manhattan. According to Billboard, this studio was intended to "cater to the full range of independent labels in New York", not just Zero Hour.

== Artists ==
Artists who released one or more albums on Zero Hour included:

- 22 Brides
- The Black Watch
- Boyracer
- The Cucumbers
- Grover (featuring Angie Carlson of Let's Active)
- John Wesley Harding
- Dirt Merchants
- Space Needle
- Steve Wynn, who became the first established artist the label worked with when it released his album Melting in the Dark in 1996
- Swervedriver
- Varnaline
- Kittywinder
- The Multiple Cat
