= Something to Remember Me By (disambiguation) =

Something to Remember Me By is a 1997 album by Australian musician Ben Lee. It may also refer to:

- Something to Remember Me By (film), a 2005 Spanish drama film
- Something to Remember Me By: Three Tales, a 1991 book by Saul Bellow
- "Something to Remember Me By", a song by Alice Cooper from the 2011 album Welcome 2 My Nightmare
- "Something to Remember Me By", a song by The Horrors from the 2017 album V
- "Something to Remember Me By", a song by Jim Walker from the soundtrack of the 1987 film Three O'Clock High
- "Something to Remember Me By", a song by Steve Wynn from the album Kerosene Man

== See also ==
- Something to Remember
- Something to Remember You By (disambiguation)
- I'll Give You Something to Remember Me By
