= Out of the Grey (The Dream Syndicate album) =

Studio album by the Dream Syndicate
- Released: 23 May 1986
- Genre: Alternative rock
- Length: 66:29 (1997 reissue)
- Label: Big Time/Chrysalis
- Producer: Paul B. Cutler

The Dream Syndicate chronology
Medicine Show (1984)	Out of the Grey (1986)	Ghost Stories (1988)

Out of the Grey is the third studio album by the Dream Syndicate, a Los Angeles-based alternative rock band, released in 1986.

== Background ==
Out of the Grey was released in 1986 as the first studio album after the band was dropped from A&M Records due to disappointing sales after the release of the 1984 album This Is Not the New Dream Syndicate Album... Live! The band pondered its future and even retired temporarily, while lead singer and songwriter Steve Wynn made a record with Dan Stuart (as Danny & Dusty). The duo's album, Lost Weekend (1985), was produced by Paul B. Cutler, who also produced the Dream Syndicate's eponymous first EP (1982). Jamming with Cutler, a guitar player, rekindled the desire in Wynn to bring the Dream Syndicate together again. The band reformed after some personnel changes, most notably the replacement of lead guitarist Karl Precoda by Cutler. The band's sound changed also, to a "considerably more aggressive, but simultaneously country-inflected outlook." The "more mainstream" sound, however, did not lead to commercial success.

The response to the album from fans and critics was positive, and after its release the band toured Europe before going on its first American tour in two years. Right after the release of the record, when the band seemed to be "back on track", the label, Big Time Records, folded, to the band's detriment; it went back into inactivity and Wynn played acoustic solo dates for a while.

== Release ==
The album was followed by an EP, 50 in a 25 Zone, which contained additional tracks including Slim Harpo's "Shake Your Hips". Two singles were released from the album: Alice Cooper's "Ballad of Dwight Fry" in mid-1986, and Eric Clapton and Bonnie Bramlett's "Let It Rain" in 1987. The song "Boston" is an homage to Van Morrison; Wynn explained that the song refers to the time Morrison spent in Boston between the breakup of Them and the start of his solo career.

Originally released on vinyl, the album was released on CD with a few bonus tracks, and in 1997 on Normal Records with 5 more tracks than the original album had.

== Reception ==
According to Mikal Gilmore, Out of the Grey is a "bracing work of redemption" after the band's breakup; he considers it their finest album. According to Don Waller, writing for the Los Angeles Times, "the brain-cloudy 'Boston' and the violent '50 in a 25 Zone' are stark and dark and mark this still-developing outfit as a force to be reckoned with long after all the local New York Dolls imitators have settled down into comfortable lives as light-truck salesmen". A reviewer for The Michigan Daily commented on the "relatively polished sound" and singled out "Boston", "50 in a 25 Zone", and "Now I Ride Alone" for praise.

== Track listing ==
All songs by Steve Wynn except otherwise indicated.

1. "Out of the Grey"
2. "Forest for the Trees"
3. "50 in a 25 Zone" (Steve Wynn, Dennis Duck, Mark Walton, Paul B. Cutler)
4. "Boston"
5. "Blood Money" (not included on original vinyl release)
6. "Slide Away"
7. "Dying Embers" (Steve Wynn, Mark Walton, Scott Walton)
8. "Now I Ride Alone"
9. "Drinking Problem" (not included on original vinyl release)
10. "Dancing Blind"
11. "You Can't Forget"
12. "Let it Rain" (not included on original vinyl release) (Eric Clapton, Bonnie Bramlett)

=== Extra tracks on the 1997 re-release ===
1. "Cinnamon Girl" (Neil Young)
2. "Ballad of Dwight Fry" (Michael Bruce, Alice Cooper)
3. "Shake Your Hips" (Slim Harpo)
4. "I Won't Forget"
5. "The Lonely Bull" (Sol Lake)

== Personnel ==
- Steve Wynn – vocals, guitar
- Paul B. Cutler – lead guitar, backing vocals
- Mark Walton – bass
- Dennis Duck – drums
- Johnette Napolitano – vocals on "Let It Rain"
