= Here Come the Miracles =

Studio album by Steve Wynn
- Released: April 24, 2001
- Genre: Psychedelic rock
- Length: 81:59
- Label: Blue Rose
- Producer: Craig Schumacher

Steve Wynn chronology
Suitcase Sessions (2000)	Here Come the Miracles (2001)	Static Transmission (2003)

Here Come the Miracles is a double album by Steve Wynn. It was released in 2001 on Blue Rose Records. It is the first album in Wynn's "desert trilogy".

== Production ==
The album was recorded in Tucson, Arizona, at Wavelab Studios. Wynn's friends Linda Pitmon (drums), Chris Brokaw (guitar), and Chris Cacavas (keyboards) played on the album.

== Critical reception ==
Professional ratings
Review scores
Source	Rating
AllMusic	4/5 stars
Robert Christgau	(dud)
The Encyclopedia of Popular Music	3/5 stars

No Depression wrote that "Wynn’s nineteen-song cycle of a Southern California suspended between the millennium and the apocalypse infuses his literary aspirations with rock ‘n’ roll smarts, as if he's fronting Raymond Chandler's supercharged garage band." The Los Angeles Times called the album "a freewheeling yet self-assured balance of Wynn’s own voice and the influences long associated with him--the darkness of the Velvet Underground, the spaciousness of Neil Young and the oblique introspection of Bob Dylan." The Washington Post called the album the best of Wynn's career. The Cleveland Scene called it "an amazing, visionary double CD, a voyage through the psychic topography of contemporary Los Angeles that taps into and expresses deep fears as well as hopes for redemption."

== Track listing ==
Songs written by Steve Wynn, except where noted.

Disc 1

1. "Here Come the Miracles" (Wynn, Linda Pitmon)
2. "Shades of Blue"
3. "Sustain"
4. "Blackout"
5. "Butterscotch"
6. "Southern California Line"
7. "Morningside Heights"
8. "Let's Leave It Like That"
9. "Crawling Misanthropic Blues"
10. "Drought"
11. "Death Valley Rain" (Wynn, Pitmon)

Disc 2

1. "Strange New World"
2. "Sunset to the Sea"
3. "Good and Bad"
4. "Topanga Canyon Freaks" (Wynn, Pitmon)
5. "Watch Your Step"
6. "Charity"
7. "Smash Myself to Bits"
8. "There Will Come a Day"
