= Something to Remember You By =

Something to Remember You By may refer to:

- "Something to Remember You By" (1930 song), written by Arthur Schwartz and Howard Dietz
- "Something to Remember You By" (Prairie Oyster song), by Canadian country music group Prairie Oyster
- Something to Remember You By, 2013 novel by Gene Wilder

== See also ==
- Something to Remember
- Something to Remember Me By (disambiguation)
