= Kerosene Man =

Studio album by Steve Wynn
- Released: 1990
- Label: Rhino
- Producer: Joe Chiccarelli

Steve Wynn chronology
Kerosene Man (1990)	Dazzling Display (1992)

Kerosene Man is an album by the American musician Steve Wynn, released in 1990. Wynn supported the album with a North American tour.

The title track was released as a single. The album sold more than 70,000 copies in its first year of release.

== Production ==
Recorded in early 1990 after the resolution of legal issues related to the breakup of the Dream Syndicate, the album was produced by Joe Chiccarelli. Wynn had 40 songs to choose from, selecting 11 that were in a more pop style. "Conspiracy of the Heart" is a duet with Johnette Napolitano. "Here on Earth as Well" was written in the early 1980s. Steve Berlin played saxophone on some of the songs; Fernando Saunders played bass. Wynn used strings on some tracks. Edward Colver contributed some of the photography.

== Critical reception ==
Professional ratings
Review scores
Source	Rating
Chicago Sun-Times	3.5/4 stars
Robert Christgau	(dud)
The Encyclopedia of Popular Music	4/5 stars
MusicHound Rock: The Essential Album Guide	2/5 stars
Orlando Sentinel	5/5 stars
The Rolling Stone Album Guide	3.5/5 stars
Select	3/5

The Orlando Sentinel wrote that "some of Wynn's influences become pretty obvious, but he puts his own spin on them with his distinctive voice that couches a snarl in crooner-smooth phrasing"; the paper listed the album among the 10 best of 1990. The New York Times noted that the songs "are more tuneful and often funnier or more compassionate than typical Dream Syndicate fare."

The Dallas Morning News determined that "guitar noise still predominates ... occasionally, Mr. Wynn lets things get all languid and acoustic." The Plain Dealer opined that "it seems that throughout the album when the writing is there the music fails, and when the music is working the writing breaks down." Spin stated that, "unpredictable and obsessive, Wynn's characters carry an unsettling edge of preoccupation."

== Track listing ==
No.	Title	Length
1.	"Tears Won't Help"
2.	"Carolyn"
3.	"The Blue Drifter"
4.	"Younger"
5.	"Under the Weather"
6.	"Here on Earth as Well"
7.	"Something to Remember Me By"
8.	"Killing Time"
9.	"Conspiracy of the Heart"
10.	"Kerosene Man"
11.	"Anthem"
