= Ultraviolet Battle Hymns and True Confessions =

Studio album by The Dream Syndicate
- Released: June 10, 2022
- Recorded: July 2021
- Studio: Montrose Recording, Richmond, Virginia, US
- Length: 45:13
- Language: English
- Label: Fire
- Producer: John Agnello; The Dream Syndicate

The Dream Syndicate chronology
| The Universe Inside (2020) | Ultraviolet Battle Hymns and True Confessions (2022) | Live Through the Past, Darkly (2024) |

When we made this record it was July of 2021, deep in the thick of the pandemic and things were just starting to get a little opened up. As a band, we hadn’t been together, let alone played together in a year and a half. So, I think we just wanted to do everything at once. It’s what happens when you have been cooped up and suddenly your outside again or you’re with other people. It’s like a dog chasing its own tail. We just wanted to play everything and I don’t think we had any kind of idea what this record was going to be like.

—Band leader Steve Wynn on recording Ultraviolet Battle Hymns and True Confessions during the COVID-19 pandemic.

Ultraviolet Battle Hymns and True Confessions is a 2022 studio album by American rock band The Dream Syndicate. It has received positive reviews from critics for expanding the band's sound.

== Reception ==
According to the review aggregator Metacritic, Ultraviolet Battle Hymns and True Confessions received "universal acclaim" based on a weighted average score of 90 out of 100 from 4 critic scores. Editors at AllMusic rated this album 4 out of 5 stars, with critic Mark Deming writing that this album is "every bit as imaginative and uncompromising as what they conjured when they were noisy heroes of the paisley underground" in the 1980s and that the band drew on progressive rock influences for "mood and atmosphere". At Paste, Eric R. Danton rated this album a 7.4 out of 10, calling this a "return to form" after the experimental rock of 2020's The Universe Inside, while still retaining stylistic variation with "something here for any Dream Syndicate fan". Writing for Spill Magazine, Ljubinko Zivkovic scored this release an 8 out of 10, summing up that "the band has gained an extra edge, coming up with a batch of their most memorable songs in recent times". Uncut's Sharon O'Connell gave Ultraviolet Battle Hymns and True Confessions an 8 out of 10, writing that chosen to "evolve rather than preserve their psychedelic/country pop sound by introducing notes of R&B, funkand, jazz, andleaning into early Floyd".

== Track listing ==
All songs written by Steve Wynn, except where noted

1. "Where I’ll Stand" – 5:18
2. "Damian" – 4:21
3. "Beyond Control" (Chris Cacavas and Wynn) – 5:56
4. "The Chronicles of You" (Emil Nikolaisen and Wynn) – 2:52
5. "Hard to Say Goodbye" – 5:08
6. "Every Time You Come Around" (Nikolaisen and Wynn) – 3:46
7. "Trying to Get Over (Dennis Duck and Wynn) – 3:36
8. "Lesson Number One" – 4:20
9. "My Lazy Mind" – 5:06
10. "Straight Lines" – 4:51

== Personnel ==
The Dream Syndicate

- Steve Wynn – rhythm guitar, lead vocals, production, photography
- Dennis Duck – drums, backing vocals, production
- Mark Walton – bass guitar, backing vocals, production
- Jason Victor – lead guitar, backing vocals, production
- Chris Cacavas – keyboards, production

Additional personnel

- John Agnello – recording; mixing at The Rabbit Hole, Raleigh, North Carolina, US; production
- Greg Calbi – audio mastering at Sterling Sound Edgewater, New Jersey, US
- Steve Fallone – audio mastering at Sterling Sound Edgewater, New Jersey, US
- Alex Hornsby – artwork
- Stephen McCarthy – backing vocals
- Adrian Olsen – recording
- Linda Pitmon – backing vocals
- Alexandra Spalding – backing vocals
- Marcus Tenney's – saxophone, trumpet

== See also ==
- 2022 in American music
- List of 2022 albums
