= Crossing Dragon Bridge =

Studio album by Steve Wynn
- Released: April 21, 2008
- Studio: Elias Arts, New York City, New York, US; Sono Studios, Prague, Czechia; Studio Attic, Ljubljana, Slovenia; Studio Metro, Ljubljana, Slovenia; Studio Zuma, Ljubljana, Slovenia; SwanTone, Los Angeles, California, US; The White Lodge, Ludwigsberg, Baden-Württemberg, Germany
- Length: 49:22
- Language: English
- Label: Rock Ridge Music
- Producer: Chris Eckman; Steve Wynn

Steve Wynn chronology
Live in Bremen (2008)	Crossing Dragon Bridge (2008)	Live in Brussels (2009)

Crossing Dragon Bridge is a 2008 studio album by American rock singer-songwriter Steve Wynn, inspired by Slovenia. The album has received positive reviews from critics.

== Reception ==
Editors at AllMusic rated this album 4.5 out of 5 stars, with critic Thom Jurek writing that Wynn's trip to Slovenia led him to "come up with an astonishing collection of very diverse tunes that were different than anything he'd ever written or recorded before" resulting in "the most sophisticated thing he's ever recorded" that is "a songwriter's album but one that is full of surprise, delight, and a sense of poetry that is wiry, tough, and tender" and "Wynn's masterpiece". Allison Stewart of No Depression called this album "almost certainly [Wynn's] best in fifteen years, if not ever", characterizing it as a "spartan folk album with overlays of choirs, string sections and various effects, it’s echoey and hallucinatory and displaced-feeling, both kin to and totally unlike anything Wynn has ever done". In The Oklahoman, Gene Triplett stated that Crossing Dragon Bridge is "one of the most intimate collections yet" by Wynn. Thomas Bond of Phoenix New Times called this release a "tasteful mix of Americana and Eastern European sounds, woven tightly together by Wynn's always compelling narratives" and stated that long-time listeners to Wynn's music are rewarded by his growth as a songwriter. Editors at PopMatters, this was chosen as the best singer-songwriter album of 2008 and Michael Keefe called it "an unusually acoustic-leaning and sophisticated sounding release for" Wynn and a dedicated review by Jennifer Kelly saw her rating this release an 8 out of 10, praising the "subdued, backwards-looking tone, with Wynn trading the garage rock of his last three albums for a palette of strings, acoustic guitar, choral vocals, and drums" with moods varying from "weathered optimism" to "rockers [that] are downright fun, the kind of sly, shivery psychedelic grooves that Wynn has been perfecting for decades". Sender of Tiny Mix Tapes gave this release a 3.5 out of 5 for its "darkly-shaded Americana" that is "is confident and prodigious as a piece of songwriting" but lacks some emotion and has murky production.

== Track listing ==
All songs written by Steve Wynn, except where noted.

1. "Slovenian Rhapsody I" – 1:40
2. "Manhattan Fault Line" – 5:13
3. "Love Me Anyway" (Chris Eckman and Wynn) – 3:25
4. "She Came" (Tomas Pengov) – 3:37
5. "When We Talk About Forever" – 3:52
6. "Annie & Me" – 4:51
7. "Wait Until You Get to Know Me" – 2:49
8. "Punching Holes in the Sky" – 3:57
9. "Bring the Magic" (Chris Cacavas and Wynn) – 4:09
10. "God Doesn’t Like It" – 4:17
11. "Believe in Yourself" – 3:46
12. "I Don’t Deserve This" (Polar and Wynn) – 5:34
13. "Slovenian Rhapsody II" – 2:11

== Personnel ==
"Slovenian Rhapsody I"

- Steve Wynn – acoustic guitar, lead vocals
- Vlado Kreslin – whistling

"Manhattan Fault Line"

- Steve Wynn – acoustic guitar, electric guitar, fuzz bass, stylophone, lead vocals
- Tim Adams – backing vocals
- Apollon Chamber Orchestra – orchestra
  - Libor Kaňka – violin
  - Jiří Kohoutek – violin
  - Radek Křižanovský – violin
  - Jaromir Stepan – violin
- Chris Eckman – drum programming, string arrangement
- Linda Pitmon – percussion, backing vocals

"Love Me Anyway"

- Steve Wynn – electric guitar, organ, lead vocals
- Tim Adams – backing vocals
- Chris Eckman – electric guitar solo, bass programming, drum programming
- Linda Pitmon – backing vocals

"She Came"

- Steve Wynn – acoustic guitar, lead vocals
- Carnice Vocal Group – choir
- Chris Eckman – acoustic guitar, electric piano, string arrangement
- Ziga Golob – double bass

"When We Talk About Forever"

- Steve Wynn – acoustic guitar, lead vocals
- Apollon Chamber Orchestra – strings
- Chris Eckman – string arrangement
- Ziga Golog – double bass
- Linda Pitmon – drums, percussion, backing vocals

"Annie & Me"

- Steve Wynn – bass guitar, acoustic guitar, handclaps, lead vocals
- Chris Eckman – Mellotron, backing vocals, drum programming
- Linda Pitmon – percussion, handclaps, backing vocals
- Kirk Swan – lead guitar

"Wait Until You Get to Know Me"

- Steve Wynn – acoustic guitar, electric guitar, lead vocals
- Tim Adams – backing vocals
- Blaz Celarec – drums
- Chris Eckman – vibraphone, sound effects treatments
- Ziga Golog – double bass
- Linda Pitmon – percussion

"Punching Holes in the Sky"

- Steve Wynn – acoustic guitar, lead vocals
- Apollon Chamber Orchestra – strings
- Chris Eckman – string arrangement

"Bring the Magic"

- Steve Wynn – bass guitar, acoustic guitar, lead vocals, backing vocals
- Apollon Chamber Orchestra – strings
- Chris Cacavas – Casio keyboard

"God Doesn't Like It"

- Steve Wynn – bass guitar, acoustic guitar, harmonica, lead vocals
- Tim Adams – backing vocals
- Chris Eckman – drum programming
- Linda Pitmon – percussion, backing vocals

"Believe in Yourself"

- Steve Wynn – acoustic guitar, lead vocals
- Chris Eckman – Mellotron, Persephone synthesizer, Moog bass
- Linda Pitmon – backing vocals

"I Don't Deserve This"

- Steve Wynn – acoustic guitar, electric guitar, bass guitar, keyboards, lead vocals
- Chris Cacavas – sound effects treatments
- Carnice Vocal Group – choir
- Chris Eckman – Mellotron, banjo, drum programming, sound effects treatments
- Linda Pitmon – backing vocals

"Slovenian Rhapsody II"

- Steve Wynn – acoustic guitar, lead vocals
- Anda Eckman – backing vocals
- Chris Eckman – harmonium, zither, banjo, Mellotron, backing vocals
- Ziga Golob – double bass
- Vlado Kreslin – vocal duet

Technical personnel

- Steve Wynn – production, photography, liner notes
- Peter Braatz – photography
- Greg Calbi – audio mastering at Sterling Sound, Edgewater, New Jersey, United States and Pauler Acoustics, Northeim, Germany
- Blaž Celarec – recording at Studio Attic
- Daniel Dzula – recording at Elias Arts, engineering
- Chris Eckman – recording, production
- Johnny Hott – photography
- Blaz Hribar – choir recording
- Rainer Lolk – recording at The White Lodge
- Tucker Martine – mixing at Flora Recording & Playback, Portland, Oregon, United States
- Jürgen Peschel – design
- Štěpán Pražák – orchestra conducting on "Manhattan Fault Line"
- Kirk Swan – recording at SwanTone, audio engineering
- Michal Vaniš – strings recording

== See also ==
- 2008 in rock music
- List of 2008 albums
