= Lisa Pifer =

American musician

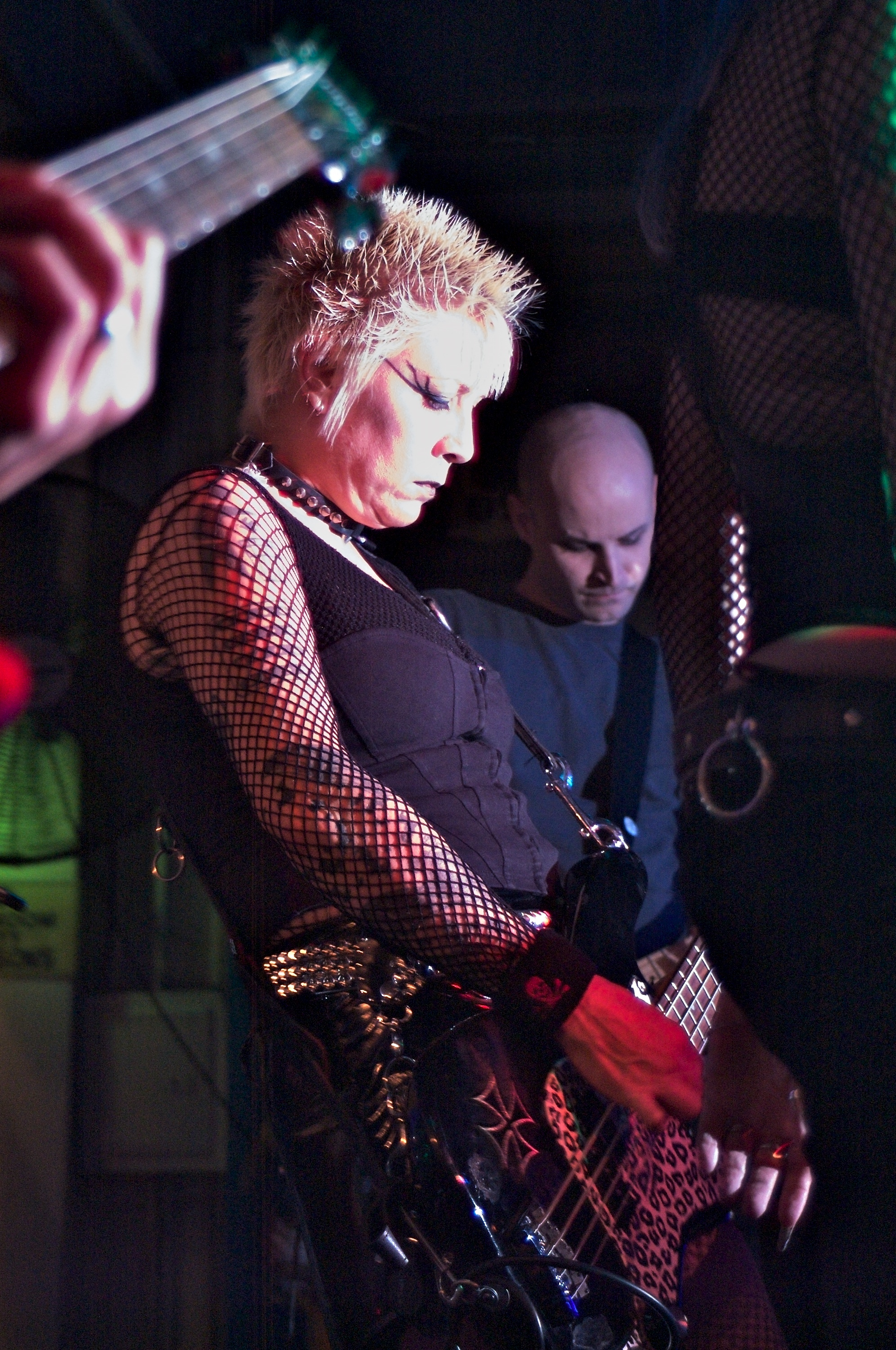
Lisafer playing with 45 Grave in 2007.

Lisa Pifer (born 1967), also known as Lisafer, is an American bass player and songwriter from Los Angeles. She has played in many punk bands, including 45 Grave, D.I., Nina Hagen, Snap-her, U.X.A., and Lisafer. She is of German-Dutch descent.

== Biography ==
Pifer grew up around musicians, most notably the Electric Prunes as her mother's close friend Pamela was married to James Lowe the Prunes' singer. The Prunes were her first look into the music world and Lisa took piano lessons and wrote songs as a child due to their influence.

It was in the 1990s that she joined Snap-Her & recorded her first punk songs. This all-girl line-up was featured on the cover of Flipside Fanzine. Many said it was due to their short skirts and garter belts. Soon after, they were signed to the New Red Archives label out of San Francisco and run by UK Subs guitarist Nicky Garratt, who released the first full-length Snap-Her album "It Smells, It Burns, It Stings".

From 2004–2009, Lisa played with Dinah Cancer & the Grave Robbers which has morphed into the return of 45 Grave with Rikk Agnew on guitar. In July 2012, Lisa joined forces with Texacala Jones in Hey!

In November 2013 she teamed up with Arthur Hays (the Next, Mystery Dates, Hickoids) & J.r. Delgado to front their newest project, Screech of Death, and played bass in The Next with Ty Gavin (S.A. Creeper, Screwballs). As of 2018, Bill "Robert Conn" De Gidio of the Pagans played guitar for Screech of Death. Lisa continues to record and play.
