= These Times (The Dream Syndicate album) =

Studio album by the Dream Syndicate
- Released: 2019
- Studios: Montrose Recording, Richmond, Virginia; Russell Street Recording, Brooklyn, New York
- Genre: Alternative rock
- Label: ANTI-
- Producers: John Agnello, the Dream Syndicate

The Dream Syndicate chronology
| How Did I Find Myself Here? (2017) | These Times (2019) | The Universe Inside (2020) |

These Times is the sixth studio album by American alternative rock band the Dream Syndicate.

== Track listing ==
| No. | Title | Length |
|---|---|---|
| 1. | "The Way In" | 2:41 |
| 2. | "Put Some Miles On" | 4:00 |
| 3. | "Black Light" | 4:41 |
| 4. | "Bullet Holes" | 4:03 |
| 5. | "Still Here Now" | 4:09 |
| 6. | "Speedway" | 3:16 |
| 7. | "Recovery Mode" | 3:53 |
| 8. | "The Whole World's Watching" | 5:50 |
| 9. | "Space Age" | 3:08 |
| 10. | "Treading Water Underneath the Stars" | 4:15 |

== Personnel ==
- Steve Wynn - lead vocals, guitar
- Jason Victor - guitar, backing vocals
- Mark Walton - bass guitar
- Dennis Duck - drums
- Chris Cacavas - keyboards
- Linda Pitmon, Stephen McCarthy - backing vocals
