= The Universe Inside =

Studio album by the Dream Syndicate
- Released: April 10, 2020
- Studios: Montrose, Richmond, Virginia
- Length: 58:23
- Label: Anti-
- Producers: Adrian Olsen, John Agnello, the Dream Syndicate

The Dream Syndicate chronology
These Times (2019)	The Universe Inside (2020)	Ultraviolet Battle Hymns and True Confessions (2022)

Professional ratings
Review scores
Source	Rating
AllMusic	4/5 stars
American Songwriter	4/5 stars
Beats Per Minute	69%

The Universe Inside is the seventh studio album by American alternative rock band the Dream Syndicate. It was released on April 10, 2020, under Anti-.

The first single from the album, "The Regulator", was released on February 26, 2020.

== Track listing ==
All tracks lyrics composed by Steve Wynn; all music composed by Chris Cacavas, Dennis Duck, Jason Victor, Mark Walton, Stephen McCarthy and Steve Wynn

The Universe Inside track listing
No.	Title	Length
1.	"The Regulator"	20:27
2.	"The Longing"	7:36
3.	"Apropos of Nothing"	9:32
4.	"Dusting Off the Rust"	9:55
5.	"The Slowest Rendition"	10:53

== Personnel ==
The Dream Syndicate

- Steve Wynn – lead vocals, guitar
- Jason Victor – guitar, backing vocals
- Chris Cacavas – keyboards
- Mark Walton – bass guitar
- Dennis Duck – drums

=== "Special guests" ===
- Stephen McCarthy – electric sitar, guitar, six-string bass, pedal steel, backing vocals
- Marcus Tenney – saxophone, trumpet
- Johnny Hott – percussion
