= The Days of Wine and Roses =

The Days of Wine & Roses
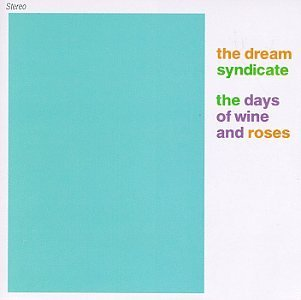

Studio album by the Dream Syndicate
- Released: October 1982
- Recorded: September 1982
- Genres: Post-punk, jangle pop, Paisley Underground
- Length: 42:33
- Labels: Ruby/Slash (original release); Rhino (reissue); Rough Trade
- Producer: Chris D.

The Dream Syndicate chronology
The Dream Syndicate (EP) (1982)	The Days of Wine & Roses (1982)	Medicine Show (1984)

Professional ratings
Review scores
Source	Rating
AllMusic	5/5 stars
The Encyclopedia of Popular Music	4/5 stars
Pitchfork	8.5/10
Q	4/5 stars
Spin Alternative Record Guide	8/10
Uncut	5/5 stars
The Village Voice	B+

The Days of Wine and Roses is the debut album by the American alternative rock band the Dream Syndicate. It was released in October 1982 through Ruby Records, a division of Slash Records. Produced by Chris D. (of the Flesh Eaters/Divine Horsemen), it was recorded in Los Angeles in September 1982. It was released for the first time on CD in 1993. 2001 and 2015 reissues on CD featured different bonus tracks.

The phrase "days of wine and roses" is originally from the poem "Vitae Summa Brevis" by the English writer Ernest Dowson (1867–1900):

They are not long, the days of wine and roses:

Out of a misty dream

Our path emerges for a while, then closes

Within a dream.

The album is ranked number 99 in Blender's 100 Greatest Indie-Rock Albums Ever.

== Track listing ==
This is the track listing of the original release. Later re-releases have included bonus tracks from the earlier Down There EP, rehearsals, alternate takes, and the 1981 single recorded by 15 Minutes (a Steve Wynn collaboration with members of the Davis, California, band Alternate Learning).

All tracks written by Steve Wynn except as noted.

Side one

1. "Tell Me When It's Over" – 3:27
2. "Definitely Clean" – 3:25
3. "That's What You Always Say" – 3:08
4. "Then She Remembers" – 4:03
5. "Halloween" (Karl Precoda) – 6:29

Side two

1. "When You Smile" – 4:10
2. "Until Lately" – 6:50
3. "Too Little, Too Late" – 3:17
4. "The Days of Wine and Roses" – 7:22

Bonus Tracks (2001 Rhino Records reissue)

1. "Sure Thing" (Down There EP version)
2. "That's What You Always Say" (Down There EP version)
3. "When You Smile" (Down There EP version)
4. "Some Kinda Itch" (Down There EP version)
5. "Too Little, Too Late" (Rehearsal version)
6. "Definitely Clean" (Rehearsal version)
7. "That's What You Always Say" (15 Minutes)
8. "Last Chance For You" (15 Minutes)

Bonus Tracks (2015 Omnivore CD reissue)

1. "Is It Rolling, Bob?" (rehearsal recording)
2. "A Reason" (rehearsal recording)
3. "Still Holding on to You" (rehearsal recording)
4. "Armed with an Empty Gun" (rehearsal recording)
5. "Like Mary" (rehearsal recording)
6. "Outside the Dream Syndicate" (rehearsal recording)

Over the last years there have been several other expanded reissues and companion records such as a 4-CD expanded version, the live set "The Day Before Wine And Roses" and a disc of demos and rehearsals "Sketches for the Days Of Wine And Roses".

== Personnel ==
- Steve Wynn – guitar, vocals
- Karl Precoda – guitar
- Kendra Smith – bass, vocal ("Too Little, Too Late")
- Dennis Duck – drums
