= Ghost Stories (The Dream Syndicate album) =

Studio album by The Dream Syndicate
- Released: 1988
- Recorded: Eldorado Recording Studios
- Genre: Alternative rock
- Label: Enigma
- Producer: Elliot Mazer

The Dream Syndicate chronology
Out of the Grey (1986)	Ghost Stories (1988)	Live at Raji's (1989)

Ghost Stories is the fourth studio album by the Los Angeles-based alternative rock band The Dream Syndicate. It was released in 1988, just a year before the group disbanded. The album was re-released in 2004, with eight additional tracks recorded live for radio.

== Background ==
The Dream Syndicate were dropped from A&M Records for disappointing sales after Medicine Show (1984), and broke up. They got back together to make Out of the Grey (1986) on Big Time Records, but the record company folded and the band retired again. Lead singer and songwriter Steve Wynn played solo for a bit before the band reformed with the help of a record deal with Enigma Records to make Ghost Stories, released in 1988 and produced by Elliot Mazer of Neil Young fame. Mazer, apparently, thought that conflict was a positive creative force and made Wynn work while sick, and even "intentionally angered" him.

== Reception ==
Professional ratings
Review scores
Source	Rating
Select	5/5 medals

The album's songs are "dominated by themes of reminiscence and mortality". Reactions to the album were mixed. Gene Gregorits, writing from the perspective of Wynn's later solo career, called the album "pneumatically morose" and "depressing". Denise Sullivan, writing for AllMusic, gave the album three stars out of five and called it a "very straight-ahead rock album". In 2004, however, when an expanded edition of the album was released on CD, Seattle's No Depression offered a glowing review of the "dense, desperate clang".

== Aftermath ==
In January 1988, before the album was released, The Dream Syndicate recorded a live show in a club in Los Angeles; these recordings were produced by Mazer and they were released in 1989 as Live at Raji's. Other recordings made between 1985 and 1988 (that is, between Out of the Grey and Ghost Stories) were released in 1996 as The Lost Tapes.

The band split in 1989, and did not perform again until 2012 (with Jason Victor instead of Paul B. Cutler). Wynn noted in an interview that The Dream Syndicate might tour in 2013 and might record again; he added that he would like the opportunity to play songs from Out of the Grey and Ghost Stories, which had not happened since it "just never seemed right with the records I was promoting [and] the bands I was playing with in recent years".

== Track listing ==
All songs by Steve Wynn except where noted.

1. "The Side I'll Never Show"
2. "My Old Haunts"
3. "Loving the Sinner, Hating the Sin"
4. "Whatever You Please"
5. "Weathered and Torn"
6. "See That My Grave Is Kept Clean" (Blind Lemon Jefferson)
7. "I Have Faith" (Steve Wynn, Johnette Napolitano)
8. "Someplace Better Than This"
9. "Black"
10. "When the Curtain Falls"

== Personnel ==
=== Musicians ===
- Steve Wynn – vocals, guitar
- Paul B. Cutler – guitar, backing vocals
- Mark Walton – bass
- Dennis Duck – drums
- Chris Cacavas – piano, organ, accordion, backing vocals
- N. Velvet – backing vocals
- Rob Stennett – guitar
- Robert Lloyd – guitar on "Someplace Better Than This"
- Johnette Napolitano – backing vocals on "I Have Faith"

=== Production ===
- Elliot Mazer – production and recording
- Recorded at Eldorado, Hollywood
- Mixed at Fantasy Studios, Berkeley
