= Steve Wynn (musician) =

American musician (born 1960)

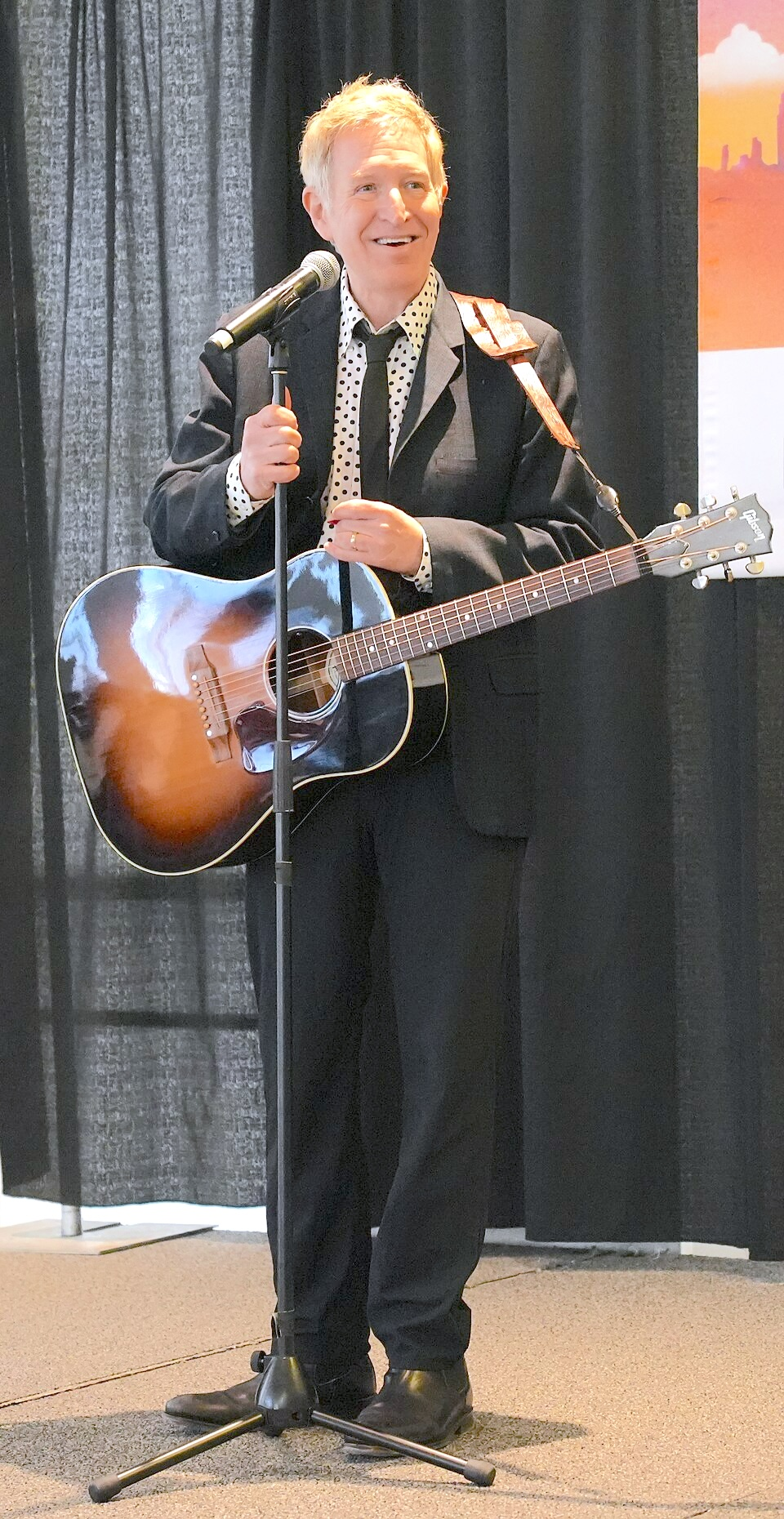
- Wynn in 2025

Background information
- Born: Steve Wynn; February 21, 1960 (age 66)
- Origin: Los Angeles, California, U.S.
- Genres: Alternative rock, Paisley Underground
- Occupations: Musician, songwriter
- Instruments: Vocals, guitar
- Years active: 1979–present
- Labels: Yep Roc, Anti-, Fire (UK)
- Website: stevewynn.net

Steve Wynn (born February 21, 1960) is an American singer, musician and songwriter. He led the band the Dream Syndicate from 1981 to 1989 in Los Angeles, afterward began a solo career, and then reformed the Dream Syndicate in 2012.

== Career ==
=== Growing up in Los Angeles ===
Wynn was born February 21, 1960, at St. John's Hospital in Santa Monica, California. He played in his first band the Light Bulbs at age 9 and followed with another band Sudden Death Overtime a year later while attending Emerson Junior High School. He later attended University High School (Los Angeles) with classmates Darby Crash and Pat Smear who would later go on to form the Germs. He left Los Angeles to attend the University of California, Davis in 1977.

=== College Years in Davis, California ===
Before forming the Dream Syndicate, Wynn played guitar in the Davis-based band Suspects, whose members included vocalist Kendra Smith (with whom he later founded the Dream Syndicate), and Russ Tolman and Gavin Blair (who would form True West). In 1979, Suspects released a single, "Talking Loud" b/w "It's Up to You", and the band remained active through 1981.

After Suspects disbanded, Wynn formed the trio 15 Minutes with two members of Alternate Learning, bass player Carolyn O'Rourke and drummer Eric Landers. With 15 Minutes, Wynn wrote and produced the 1981 single "That's What You Always Say," b/w "Last Chance For You," which he engineered with Alternate Learning's frontman, Scott Miller. The A-side, "That's What You Always Say," was later performed by the Dream Syndicate.

=== The Dream Syndicate (1981–1989) (2012–present) ===
The Dream Syndicate's eponymous EP was released on Wynn's own label, Down There Records. They were signed a few months later to Slash Records where they made The Days of Wine and Roses, a record often cited as one of the cornerstones of both the indie rock and Americana music scenes that followed. In the spring of 1983, they toured the US with U2 for three weeks and then signed with A&M Records. They recorded their second album Medicine Show with Sandy Pearlman and then toured the US for eight weeks with R.E.M. before embarking on their first European tour. Lineup changes followed along with the albums Out of the Grey and Ghost Stories and extensive touring before the band broke up in 1988.

Though they were popular with critics and had an influence on other musicians, the Dream Syndicate were not commercially successful. The band did establish the fan base on which Wynn built his solo career. The Dream Syndicate reformed in 2012 for a series of gigs in Europe and USA. They continued touring sporadically for the next few years and eventually went into the studio in 2017 to record their first album on new material since reforming. The album, How Did I Find Myself Here?, was released on September 8, 2017, on the Anti- label. In 2019 Dream Syndicate released their second album of original material since reforming, These Times. A more improvisational album, The Universe Inside, followed in 2020.

=== Solo career and side projects ===
Wynn broke up the Dream Syndicate in 1989 to redefine (or "undefine") himself, and has since released a number of solo albums exploring various musical styles. His first solo album, Kerosene Man (on which Dream Syndicate bassist Mark Walton played also) included a duet with Johnette Napolitano of Concrete Blonde, backing work by bassist Fernando Saunders, drummer D. J. Bonebrake from the L.A. punk band X, Howe Gelb of Giant Sand and saxophonist Steve Berlin from Los Lobos. Peter Buck, from R.E.M., played on its follow-up, Dazzling Display, and co-wrote the title song. After 1994's Fluorescent, he left Los Angeles for New York. Backing on Melting in the Dark (1996) was provided by the Boston band Come.

In 1997, Wynn recorded Sweetness and Light in Hoboken, New Jersey with Rich Gilbert, Armistead Wellford and Linda Pitmon. The record also marked the first collaboration with producer/engineer John Agnello.

Here Come the Miracles (2001) won the American Association of Independent Music award for Best Rock Alternative album in 2002. The record was the first of three albums, later known as the Desert Trilogy, that Wynn made in Tucson at Wavelab Studios with producer/engineer and studio owner Craig Schumacher. He toured behind these albums in the following years with his band the Miracle 3, consisting of Jason Victor, Dave DeCastro and Linda Pitmon, often augmented live and in the studio by Chris Cacavas (Green on Red, The Dream Syndicate) on keyboards. Dutch native and resident Erik Van Loo substituted for DeCastro on several tours and on the 2006 Live Tick album, recorded in Geislingen, Germany.

Wynn's song "Amphetamine" from Static Transmission was re-recorded by the cast of the movie Bandslam and performed in its entirety in the film.

In 1985, Wynn wrote a collection of songs with Dan Stuart of Green on Red, and recorded and released them as Danny & Dusty, The Lost Weekend. The two reunited in 2007 for a second album, Cast Iron Soul, followed by two tours of Europe.

In the 1990s, he was a part of the indie supergroup Gutterball along with Stephen McCarthy of The Long Ryders, Bob Rupe of The Silos and Cracker, and Bryan Harvey and Johnny Hott of House of Freaks. The band recorded and released three albums and toured Europe extensively between 1993 and 1995.

The double CD From a Man of Mysteries: A Steve Wynn Tribute was released by the German label Blue Rose in 2004 and features Wynn's songs performed by the likes of Concrete Blonde, the Silos, Chuck Prophet, The Minus 5, Russ Tolman of True West and others.

In 2007, Wynn formed The Baseball Project with Scott McCaughey, Peter Buck and Linda Pitmon. The band's debut album Volume 1: Frozen Ropes and Dying Quails came out the following April with their first live performance coming on the Late Show with David Letterman. The band has gone on to make four albums about the national pastime, later adding R.E.M.'s Mike Mills to the lineup.

The album Crossing Dragon Bridge, recorded in Ljubljana, Slovenia and produced by Chris Eckman of The Walkabouts, also came out in 2008 and was called "Wynn's masterpiece" by Thom Jurek of AllMusic.

Wynn was hired by Norwegian film and TV director Øystein Karlsen to write the score and provide the soundtrack for the fourth and final season of the hit series Dag and then hired him again for the first season of Exit, which was the highest streamed show in Norwegian history.

In 2020, Real Gone Music released Decade, an 11-CD box set containing all of the official albums Wynn released during his first 10 years of living in New York City, along with 57 previously unreleased tracks of home demos and rarities.

In September 2024, Jawbone Press (UK) released Steve's first book--I Wouldn't Say It If It Wasn't True--A Memoir of Life, Music and The Dream Syndicate. The book covers Steve's childhood in Los Angeles through the first run of The Dream Syndicate and the band's breakup in 1988. Americana UK said the book "scores highly on the engaging and page-turning criteria" and called it "an illuminating read." Steve followed the release with a solo tour of stories, songs and readings from the book that will continue into the summer of 2025. Fire Records (UK) released Make It Right, Steve's first new solo album since 2011 simultaneously with the release of the book.

== Discography ==
=== The Dream Syndicate ===
- The Dream Syndicate EP (1982)
- The Days of Wine and Roses (1982)
- Medicine Show (album) (1984)
- This Is Not the New Dream Syndicate Album......Live! (1984)
- Out of the Grey (1986)
- Ghost Stories (1988)
- Live at Raji's (1989)
- Tell Me When It's Over – The Best of Dream Syndicate 1982–1988 (1992)
- 3 1/2: The Lost Tapes 1985–1988 (1993)
- The Day Before Wine and Roses (1995)
- How Did I Find Myself Here? (2017)
- These Times (2019)
- The Universe Inside (2020)
- Ultraviolet Battle Hymns and True Confessions (2022)

=== Solo ===
- Kerosene Man (1990)
- Dazzling Display (1992)
- Fluorescent (1994)
- Melting in the Dark (1995)
- Sweetness and Light (1997)
- My Midnight (1999)
- Momento (2000) with Australian Blonde (Spain)
- Here Come the Miracles (2001)
- Live in Bremen (2008)
- Crossing Dragon Bridge (2008)
- Live in Brussels (with the Dragon Bridge Orchestra) (2009)
- Solo! Electric vol. 1 (2015)
- Solo! Acoustic vol. 1 (2020)
- Decade (box set) (2020)
- Make It Right (2024)

=== Steve Wynn & the Miracle 3 ===
- Static Transmission (2003)
- ...tick...tick...tick (2005 Europe, 2006 USA)
- Live Tick (2006)
- Northern Aggression (2010)

=== Danny & Dusty ===
- The Lost Weekend (1985)
- Cast Iron Soul (2007)
- Here's to You Max Morlock (2007)

=== Gutterball ===
- Gutterball (1993)
- Weasel (1995)
- Turnyor Hedinkov (1995)

=== Smack Dab ===
- Smack Dab (2007)

=== The Baseball Project ===
- Volume 1: Frozen Ropes and Dying Quails (2008)
- Broadside Ballads = One song per month for free download in ESPN.com's The Life
- Volume 2: High and Inside (2011)
- 3rd (2014)
- Live in SPACE (2020)
- Grand Salami Time! (2023)

=== Compilations ===
- Advertisements for Myself (1998) – limited edition compilation
- The Emusic Singles Collection (2001) – 12 internet singles released each month in 2000.
- Riding Shotgun (2004) – limited edition compilation
- What I Did After My Band Broke Up / Visitation Rights (2005)
- Up There – Home Recordings 2000–2008 (2012) – Limited edition (1,000 copies) compilation of home demos.

=== Other ===
- Take Your Flunky and Dangle (1994) – Outtakes 1990–1994
- The Suitcase Sessions (1998) – Sessions from Melting in the Dark Era
- Pick of the Litter (1999) – Outtakes 1996–1999
- Wynn Plays Dylan (2009) – Limited edition LP documenting a live performance of Bob Dylan songs.

== Singles ==
- "Carolyn" (1990)
- "Tears Won't Help" (1990)
- "Conspiracy Of The Heart" (1990)
- Kerosene Man EP (1991)
- "Drag" (1992)
- "Tuesday" (1992) – promo
- "Carelessly" (1994)
- Shelley's Blues pt.2 EP (1996) – includes "James River Incident"
- "Why" (1996) – promo
- "The Way You Punish Me" (1996) – promo
- How's My Little Girl EP (1997)
- "Nothing But The Shell" (1999)
- "There Will Come A Day" (2001)
- "Sustain" (2001)
- California Style EP (2003)
- "Cindy It Was Always You" (2005)
- "Bruises" (2006)

=== Singles charts ===
Year	Title	Chart positions				Album
Year	Title	US Hot 100	US Modern Rock	US Mainstream Rock	UK	Album
1990	"Tears Won't Help"	–	10	–	–	Kerosene Man
1992	"Drag"	–	30	–	–	Drag
