= The Dream Syndicate =

American alternative rock band

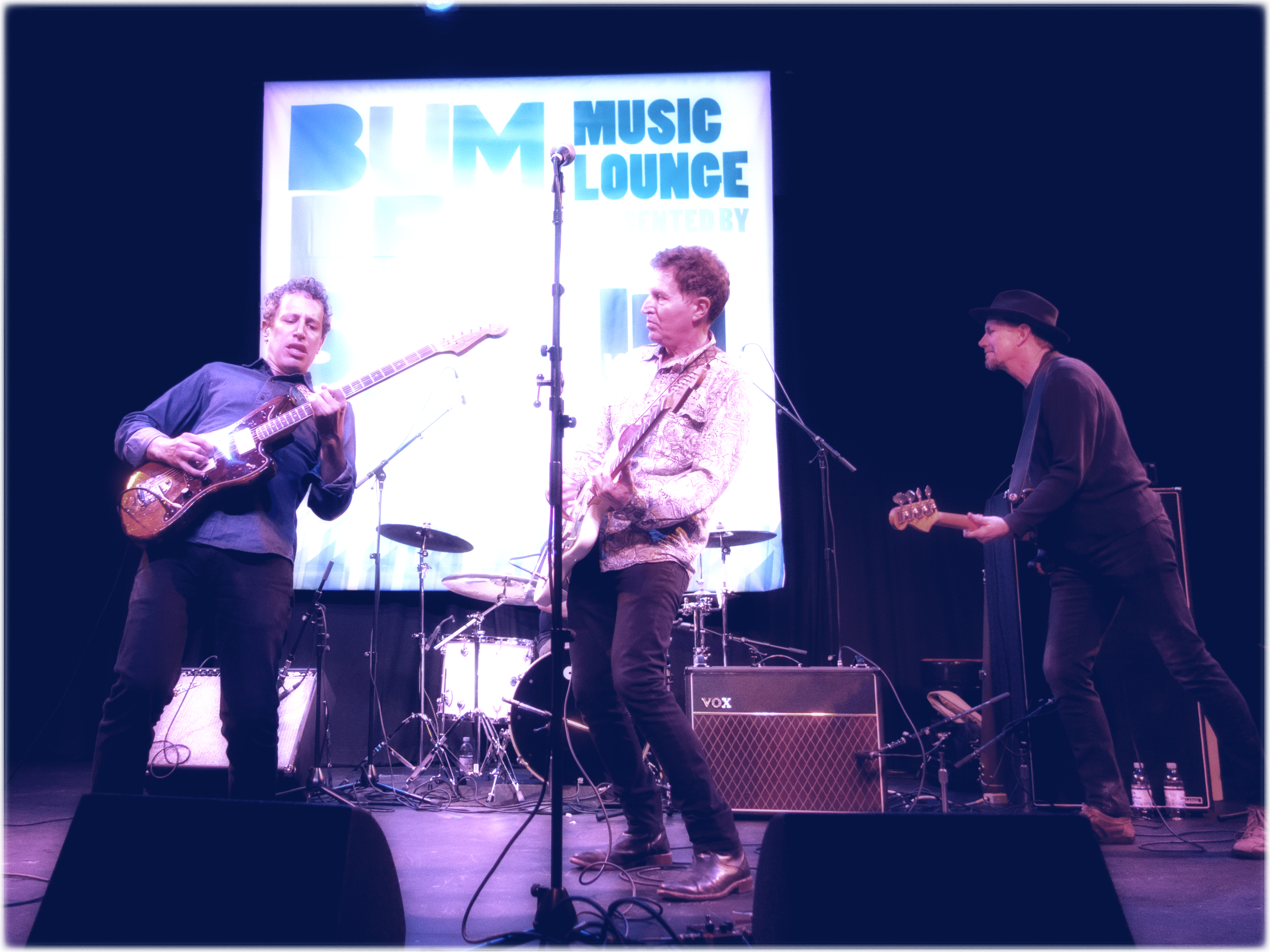
- The Dream Syndicate on August 31, 2014

Background information
- Origin: Los Angeles, California, US
- Genres: Alternative rock; neo-psychedelia; Paisley Underground; jangle pop; post-punk
- Years active: 1981–1989; 2012–present
- Labels: Ruby/Slash; Rough Trade; A&M; Chrysalis; Enigma; Big Time; Anti-; Fire
- Members: Steve Wynn; Dennis Duck; Mark Walton; Jason Victor
- Past members: Karl Precoda; Kendra Smith; David Provost; Paul B. Cutler

The Dream Syndicate is an American alternative rock band from Los Angeles, California, originally active from 1981 to 1989, and reunited since 2012. The band is associated with the Paisley Underground music movement; of the bands in that movement, according to the Los Angeles Times, the Dream Syndicate "rocked with the highest degree of unbridled passion and conviction." Though never commercially successful, the band met with considerable acclaim, especially for its songwriting and guitar playing. Bandleader Steve Wynn reformed the band in 2012, and four studio albums have been released since 2017.

== History ==
=== Formation and early years (1981–1983) ===
While attending the University of California, Davis, Steve Wynn and Kendra Smith played together (with future True West members Russ Tolman and Gavin Blair) in a band called the Suspects, regarded as the first new wave-influenced band in the Davis, California, music scene. Wynn also recorded a 1981 single with a trio that he called 15 Minutes, which included members of Alternate Learning.

After Wynn moved back to Los Angeles, while rehearsing in a band called Goat Deity (with future Wednesday Week sisters Kelly and Kristi Callan), Wynn met Karl Precoda, who had answered an ad for a bass player, and the two formed a new group, with Precoda switching to guitar. Smith joined on bass and brought in drummer Dennis Duck (Mehaffey), who had played in the locally successful Pasadena-based band Human Hands.

Duck suggested the name "the Dream Syndicate" in reference to La Monte Young's early 1960s New York experimental ensemble (better known as the Theatre of Eternal Music), whose members included John Cale and Tony Conrad.

On February 23, 1982, the Dream Syndicate performed its first show at Club Lingerie in Hollywood. A four-song EP was recorded at the home of Tom Mehren in Pasadena, with Paul B. Cutler engineering and producing, and released on Wynn's Down There label. The band quickly achieved local attention for its often aggressively long, feedback-soaked improvisations. Influences on the band, which was soon deemed "a seminal force in the city's '80s underground rock evolution", were the Velvet Underground, Neil Young and Television.

The band signed to Slash Records, whose subsidiary Ruby Records released its debut and by far best-known album, The Days of Wine and Roses, in 1982. Days of Wine and Roses "sent shockwaves through the American underground in the early 1980s," but MTV favored a different kind of music. Rough Trade Records released the album's lead track, "Tell Me When It's Over", in early 1983 as the A-side of a UK EP which also included a live cover of Neil Young's "Mr. Soul".

Subsequently, Smith left the band and joined David Roback (formerly of Rain Parade) to form Opal. She was replaced in the Dream Syndicate by David Provost.

=== Post-Kendra Smith years (1984–1989) ===
Medicine Show was recorded in 1984 in San Francisco with producer Sandy Pearlman and released that year by A&M Records. The band opened tours for R.E.M. and U2 and released the five-song live EP, This Is Not The New Dream Syndicate Album... Live!, the last record to feature Precoda on guitar (he left soon afterward to pursue a career in screenwriting) and the first appearance of bassist Mark Walton. The EP's commercial failure contributed to the group's temporary breakup. The band was dropped by A&M after the label rejected its demo for "Slide Away", later released on the semi-official It's Too Late to Stop Now.

In 1985, during the band's temporary retirement, Wynn and Dan Stuart of Green on Red wrote 10 songs together that were recorded with Duck, among others, and released by A&M as the album The Lost Weekend under the name Danny & Dusty.

After a brief hiatus (and, as one reviewer said, having taken "a trip through the major-label meat grinder"), Wynn, Duck and Walton joined with Paul B. Cutler (who had produced the group's first EP and played guitar in the proto-goth band 45 Grave) to form the next version of the Dream Syndicate. They recorded two more studio albums, Out of the Grey (1986, Chrysalis Records), produced by Cutler, and Ghost Stories (1988, Enigma Records), produced by Elliot Mazer. A live album, Live at Raji's, was recorded in 1988 (also by Mazer) before Ghost Stories, but released afterward. 1992 also featured a free release in cooperation with the band by the label Opdtapes. A free tape called "Live i Bergen" contained recordings from the band's concert in Bergen, Norway on 15 October 1988 (Opdtapes 002).

After breaking up in 1989, the band's posthumous releases included 3½ (The Lost Tapes: 1985–1988), a collection of unreleased studio sessions, and The Day Before Wine and Roses, a live KPFK radio performance recorded just before the release of the band's first album. Wynn continued as a solo artist, and Walton went on to play with the Continental Drifters.

=== Reunion (2012–present) ===
Wynn reformed the Dream Syndicate for a festival performance on September 21, 2012, at Festival BAM in Barcelona, Spain. The reformed band included Wynn, Walton, Duck and Jason Victor, Wynn's longtime lead guitarist in the Miracle 3.

On December 5–6, 2013, the Dream Syndicate played two shows with three other reunited Paisley Underground bands — the Bangles, the Three O'Clock and Rain Parade — at the Fillmore in San Francisco on the first night, then at a benefit concert at the Fonda Theatre in Los Angeles the next night. On September 26–27, 2014, the Dream Syndicate played at The EARL in East Atlanta; they were the band's first shows in the South since 1988, and included Savage Republic as the opening act. The September 26 show featured a complete performance of The Days of Wine and Roses, while the following show featured their second album, The Medicine Show. As of February 2017, the group had played more than 50 shows since reuniting.

In February 2017, Wynn announced that a forthcoming fifth studio album had been recorded at Montrose Studios in Richmond, Virginia, and mixed at Water Music in Hoboken, New Jersey. The personnel included himself, Walton, Duck and Victor, joined on keyboards by Chris Cacavas. Wynn noted that the album's final track, titled "Kendra's Dream", included vocals from Smith, the band's original bass player, who also wrote the song's lyrics. The album, How Did I Find Myself Here?, was released on September 8, 2017, on the Anti- label.

In November 2018, three new recordings by the Dream Syndicate were released as part of a compilation album called 3 × 4, which also included The Bangles, The Three O'Clock, and Rain Parade, with each of the four bands covering songs by the other bands. Following the initial Record Store Day First release as a double album on "psychedelic swirl" purple vinyl, Yep Roc Records released the album on LP, CD, and digital in February 2019.

On May 10, 2019, These Times, the second album from the re-formed band, was released on Anti-. Produced by John Agnello and the Dream Syndicate, the album was again recorded at Montrose Studios in Richmond, Virginia.

On February 26, 2019, the Dream Syndicate announced that a new studio album, The Universe Inside, was to be released on April 10, 2020, on Anti-. The band shared the first "single", "The Regulator", and its video, a 20-minute "psychedelic journey through New York City, equal parts panoramic, psychedelic, somnambulistic and political".

On February 9, 2024, the Dream Syndicate released How Did We Find Ourselves Here?. A double LP package entitled Live Through the Past Darkly included a DVD of the recent documentary How Did We Find Ourselves Here with commentary from Chris Robinson of Black Crowes, Stephen McCarthy of Long Ryders, David Fricke of Rolling Stone and more. It chronicles the band's journey from their beginnings, through conflicts with former friends, battles with major record labels, and disbandment, to their reunion in 2012. Exclusive to this DVD is a previously unavailable one-hour 1983 Dream Syndicate live concert, filmed at the Roxy in Los Angeles.

== Discography ==
=== Studio albums ===
- The Days of Wine and Roses (1982, Ruby Records/Slash Records) – #7 UK Independent Charts
- Medicine Show (1984, A&M Records) – #171 Billboard Top 200
- Out of the Grey (1986, Chrysalis Records/Big Time Records)
- Ghost Stories (1988, Enigma Records)
- How Did I Find Myself Here? (2017, Anti-) – #32 Billboard Independent Albums
- These Times (2019, Anti-) – #34 Billboard Independent Albums
- The Universe Inside (2020, Anti-)
- Ultraviolet Battle Hymns and True Confessions (2022, Fire Records)

=== EPs ===
- The Dream Syndicate (1982, Down There Records) – #25 UK Independent Charts
- Tell Me When It's Over (1983, Rough Trade Records) – #11 UK Independent Charts
- 50 in a 25 Zone (1987, Big Time Records)
- How We Found Ourselves...Everywhere! (2018, Anti-)

=== Live albums ===
- This Is Not the New Dream Syndicate Album... Live! (1984, A&M Records)
- Live at Raji's (1989, Enigma Records)
- The Day Before Wine and Roses (1994, Normal)
- Live Through the Past, Darkly (2024, Label 51 Recordings) w/DVD documentary companion

=== Compilation albums ===
- It's Too Late to Stop Now... Isn't It? (1988, self-released)
- It's Too Late to Stop Now (1989, Another Cowboy Recordings)
- Tell Me When It's Over: The Best of the Dream Syndicate 1982–1988 (1992, Rhino Records)
- 3½ (The Lost Tapes: 1985–1988) (1993, Normal)
- 3 × 4 (2018, Yep Roc) – #27 Billboard Independent Albums

=== DVDs ===
- Weathered and Torn (1992, Atavistic Video)
- How Did We Find Ourselves Here? (2024, Label 51 Recordings)
