= Medicine Show (album) =

Studio album by the Dream Syndicate
- Released: 1984
- Studio: Time Enough and World Enough (San Francisco)
- Genre: Alternative rock
- Length: 45:08
- Label: A&M
- Producer: Sandy Pearlman

The Dream Syndicate chronology
The Days of Wine and Roses (1982)	Medicine Show (1984)	Out of the Grey (1986)

Professional ratings
Review scores
Source	Rating
AllMusic	3.5/5 stars
Mojo	4/5 stars
Spin Alternative Record Guide	5/10
Uncut	4/5 stars
The Village Voice	B−

Medicine Show is the second studio album by the Dream Syndicate. It was released in 1984.

The Dream Syndicate left Slash Records, a small label that released the band's first album, The Days of Wine and Roses (1982), and signed with the A&M label. Medicine Show was produced by Sandy Pearlman; Pearlman had previously worked with Blue Öyster Cult and the Clash.

== Track listing ==
All songs written by Steve Wynn except where noted.

1. "Still Holding on to You" – 3:39
2. "Daddy's Girl" – 3:02
3. "Burn" – 5:34
4. "Armed with an Empty Gun" – 3:56
5. "Bullet with My Name on It" (Karl Precoda) – 6:20
6. "The Medicine Show" – 6:29
7. "John Coltrane Stereo Blues" – 8:48
8. "Merrittville" – 7:20

== Personnel ==
- Steve Wynn – guitar, vocals
- Karl Precoda – lead, rhythm guitars
- Dennis Duck – drums
- Dave Provost – bass

Additional musicians:

- Tom Zvoncheck – piano, Hammond B3 organ
- Sid Griffin – background vocals
- Stephen McCarthy – background vocals
- Paul Mandl – background vocals
- Gavin Blair – background vocals
