= 45 Grave =

American rock band

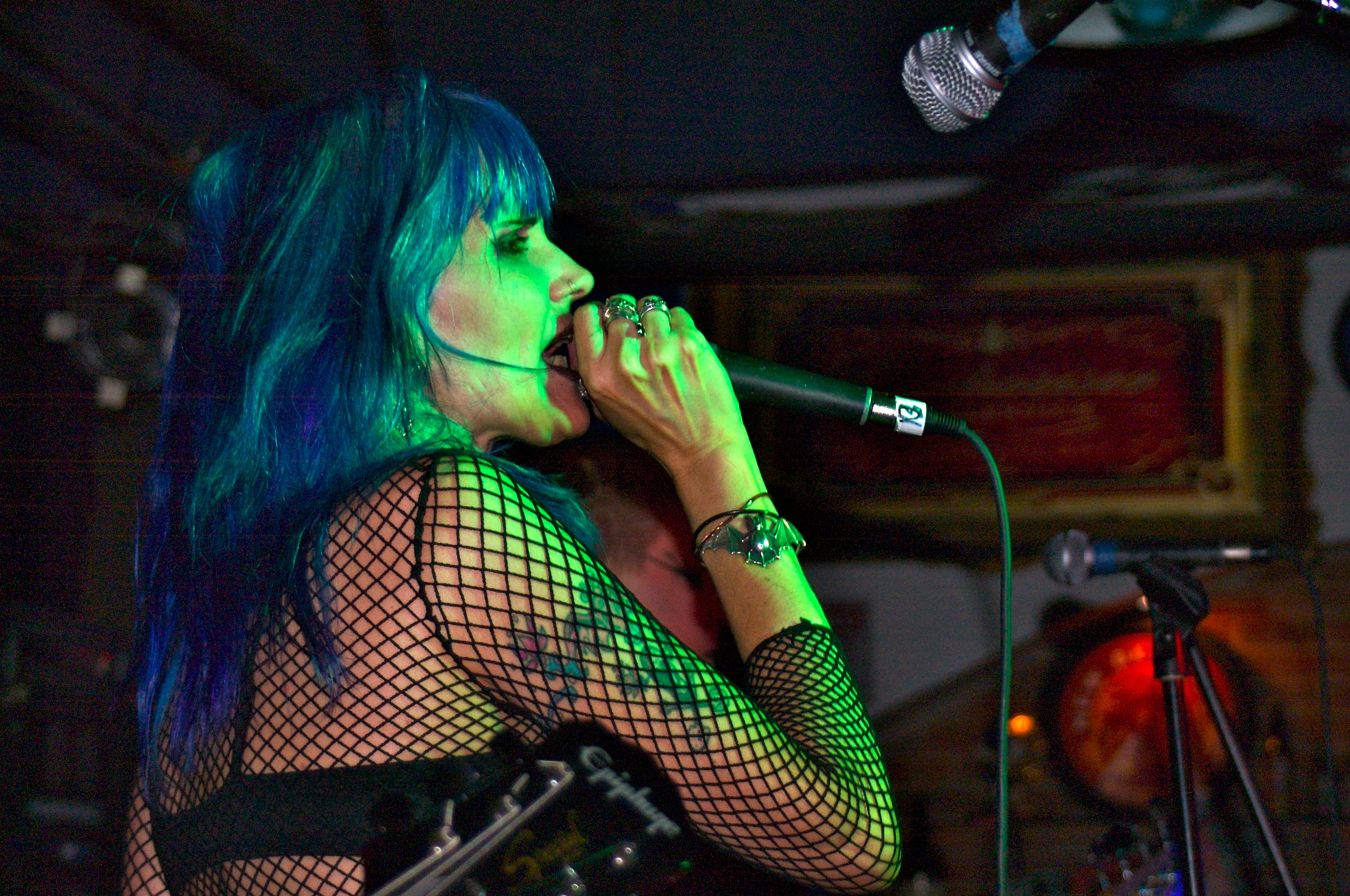
- Dinah Cancer in 2007 with the reformed 45 Grave at Blue Cafe, Long Beach, CA

Background information
- Origin: Los Angeles, California, U.S.
- Genres: Death rock; horror punk
- Years active: 1979–1985; 1988–1990; 2005–present
- Labels: Goldar; Enigma; Restless; Cleopatra; Frontier
- Members: Dinah Cancer; Tom Coyne; Daniel Munoz; Dylan Thomas
- Past members: Paul B. Cutler; Rob Graves; Don Bolles; Paul Roessler; Pat Smear; Mikey Borens; Lisa Pifer; Jamie Pina; Rikk Agnew; Mike "Thrashhead" Sullivan; L. Ron Jeremy; Kenton Holmes; Brandden Blackwell; Stevyn Grey; Frank Agnew; Mark Bolton

45 Grave is an American rock band from Los Angeles formed in 1979. The original group broke up in 1985, but vocalist Dinah Cancer subsequently revived the band.

== History ==
The band was founded during the punk rock movement by Paul B. Cutler in Los Angeles, California, alongside another band with almost the same lineup called Vox Pop, which produced two singles. 45 Grave's original lineup consisted of Cancer (formerly of Castration Squad) on vocals, Cutler (formerly of the Consumers) on guitar, Rob Graves (also known as Rob Ritter, formerly of the Exterminators, the Bags and the Gun Club) on bass, and Don Bolles (of the Exterminators, the Germs and Nervous Gender) on drums. The name, according to Bolles, derived from a mysterious button Cutler found at a thrift store and gave to Bolles for Christmas that said "WE DIG 45 GRAVE". Bolles stated that this needed to be the name of the band, and everyone agreed.

In 1980, 45 Grave recorded their first released song, "Riboflavin", included on the Los Angeles Free Music Society compilation album Darker Skratcher. The song was a cover version of the novelty song "Riboflavin-Flavored, Non-Carbonated, Polyunsaturated Blood" originally performed by Don Hinson & the Rigamorticians on their 1964 album release Monster Dance Party. The 45 Grave recording (as with the original, produced by Gary S. Paxton of Skip & Flip) achieved cult status and became a signature song of the band's live sets.

Early on, the band began by playing the Consumers songs that Cutler had written, with lyrics changed to fit Cancer's singing style, before concentrating on composing new material like "Black Cross" (issued as a single in 1981, featuring Pat Smear of the Germs on guitar on the B-side "Wax") and a fast-paced punk song called "Partytime" (which was later slowed down and reworked on their 1983 debut album and sole studio release, Sleep in Safety). Another signature 45 Grave track, "Evil", was featured on MTV, and band members appeared as extras in Ridley Scott's Blade Runner.

Despite never achieving major success, 45 Grave were recognized as being one of the first American gothic bands, predating the formation of Christian Death. The Grammy Museum in Los Angeles listed 45 Grave and Christian Death as "early proponents of American Gothic Rock".

=== Return of the Living Dead ===
In 1985, a new, heavier version of "Partytime" was featured on the soundtrack to the film The Return of the Living Dead along with tracks by bands such as T.S.O.L. and the Cramps.

The band reformed in 1988 for a brief tour, which was recorded and released as Only the Good Die Young. However, when Graves died in 1990 from an accidental drug overdose, the band broke up once again.

=== Reformation ===
In 2004, 45 Grave reformed to commemorate their 25th anniversary, with Cancer as the sole remaining member from previous incarnations. The lineup included bassist Lisa Pifer (of Snap-Her), guitarist Jamie Pina, drummer Mike "Thrashhead" Sullivan, and former Adolescents and Christian Death guitarist Rikk Agnew. Cancer posted on her MySpace blog, "I'm building this to keep the spirit of 45 Grave alive, introduce its magic to new fans, and as a personal commemorative of my best memories being the driving force and front person of 45 Grave. This is a part of my life that indeed changed me forever".

By 2006, Agnew and Pina had been replaced by guitarists L. Ron Jeremy and Kenton Holmes, who remained with the band until 2010. Stevyn Grey replaced Sullivan on drums in 2007, and was in turn replaced by Tom Coyne in 2008. Brandden Blackwell replaced Pifer on bass in 2009.

In 2018 Blackwell moved to Las Vegas and was eventually replaced on bass by multi-instrumentalist and music historian Daniel Munoz in 2022.

Night of the Demons, a 2009 remake of the classic 1987 cult horror film, featured 45 Grave's title track. In 2010, Rikk's brother Frank Agnew (T.S.O.L., Social Distortion, the Adolescents) joined the band on guitar, replacing Jeremy. Mark Bolton joined on second guitar in 2011.

Pick Your Poison, 45 Grave's first new album in 27 years, was released in 2012 on Frontier Records. The album contained a mix of new songs, unrecorded old songs and a remake of "Night of the Demons", for which a video was produced.

Former Dickies guitarist Dylan Thomas joined in 2014, replacing Bolton.

In May 2022, 45 Grave performed over two days at the Cruel World festival at the Rose Bowl in Pasadena, California. Also on the bill were Bauhaus, Devo, Blondie and Morrissey.

== Musical style ==
45 Grave's musical style was rooted in punk rock with a darker edge/horror movie aesthetic, representative of the deathrock and horror punk genres. Compared to most punk bands of the era, 45 Grave songs included more stop-start mid-song tempo changes, instrumentals and aggressive musicianship accentuated by Cutler's virtuoso guitar playing. Keyboards added to the spooky atmosphere of many songs and harkened back to proto-punk garage bands of the early 1960s. The band's output also had elements of surf rock, manifested in the instrumental "Surf Bat" from Sleep in Safety. The band's appearance drew from horror films to create a camp gothic aesthetic. However, the band's lyrical themes often adopted a tongue-in-cheek manner instead.

== Members ==
Current members

- Dinah Cancer – vocals (1979–1990, 2004–present)
- Tom Coyne – drums (2008–present)
- Dylan Thomas – guitars (2014–present)
- Daniel Munoz – bass (2022–present)

Touring musicians

- Del Hopkins – drums, keyboards (1980–1986)
- Bruce Duff – bass (1983–1985)

Former members

- Paul B. Cutler – guitars, backing vocals, keyboards (1979–1990)
- Rob Graves (aka Rob Ritter) – bass, backing vocals (1979–1990; died 1990)
- Don Bolles – drums, backing vocals (1979–1990)
- Paul Roessler – keyboards, backing vocals (1980–1990)
- Pat Smear – guitars (1981)
- Mikey Borens – guitars (1983–1984)
- Lisa Pifer – bass (2004–2009)
- Jamie Pina – guitars (2004–2006)
- Rikk Agnew – guitars (2004–2005)
- Mike "Thrashhead" Sullivan – drums (2004–2007)
- L. Ron Jeremy – guitars (2006–2010)
- Kenton Holmes – guitars (2006–2010)
- Stevyn Grey – drums (2007–2008)
- Frank Agnew – guitars (2010–2013)
- Mark Bolton – guitars (2011–2014)
- Brandden Blackwell - Bass (2010-2021)

== Discography ==
=== Studio albums ===
- Sleep in Safety (1983, Enigma; 1993, Restless) - US CMJ #66
- Pick Your Poison (2012, Frontier)

=== EPs ===
- Phantoms (1983, Enigma)
- What Is 45 Grave? A Tale of a Strange Phenomena (1984, Enigma)

=== Singles ===
- "Black Cross" b/w "Wax" (1981, Goldar)
- "School's Out" b/w "Partytime ("The Story of Sabine)" (1984, Enigma)

=== Live albums ===
- Only the Good Die Young (1989, Restless)

=== Compilation albums ===
- Autopsy (1987, Restless)
- Debasement Tapes (1993, Cleopatra)
- A Devil's Possessions – Demos & Live 1980–1983 (2008, Cleopatra)

=== Compilation appearances ===
- "Riboflavin Flavored, Non-Carbonated, Poly-Unsaturated Blood" on Darker Skratcher (1980, Los Angeles Free Music Society)
- "Bobby" on Light Bulb Magazine Number Four – "The Emergency Cassette" (1981, Los Angeles Free Music Society)
- "Evil", "Concerned Citizen" and "45 Grave" on Hell Comes to Your House (1981, Bemisbrain)
- "Partytime (Zombie Version)" on The Return of the Living Dead (Original Motion Picture Soundtrack) (1985, Enigma)
- "Insurance from God" on Enigma Variations (1985, Enigma)

== See also ==
- Deathrock
- Christian Death
