= The Return of the Living Dead =

1985 film by Dan O'Bannon

- Theatrical release poster
- Directed by: Dan O'Bannon
- Screenplay by: Dan O'Bannon
- Story by: Rudy Ricci; John Russo; Russell Streiner
- Produced by: Tom Fox
- Starring: Clu Gulager; James Karen; Don Calfa; Thom Mathews; Beverly Randolph
- Cinematography: Jules Brenner
- Edited by: Robert Gordon
- Music by: Matt Clifford
- Production companies: Hemdale Film Corporation; Fox Films, Ltd.; Cinema '84
- Distributed by: Orion Pictures
- Release date: August 16, 1985
- Running time: 91 minutes
- Country: United States
- Language: English
- Budget: $3–4 million
- Box office: $14.2 million

The Return of the Living Dead is a 1985 American satirical comedy horror film written and directed by Dan O'Bannon (in his directorial debut) from a story by Rudy Ricci, John Russo, and Russell Streiner, and starring Clu Gulager, James Karen, Thom Mathews, Don Calfa, and Beverly Randolph. The film tells the story of how a warehouse owner, accompanied by his two employees, mortician friend and a group of teenage punks, deal with the accidental release of a horde of unkillable, brain-hungry zombies onto an unsuspecting town.

The film, described as a "mordant punk comedy," is credited for introducing the concept of zombies specifically eating brains (as opposed to any form of human flesh) to the zombie genre. Additionally, the film's soundtrack was noteworthy, as it featured several Los Angeles-based deathrock and punk rock bands of the era.

The Return of the Living Dead released in the United States on August 16, 1985, by Orion Pictures. The film received mostly positive reviews and performed moderately well at the box office. It spawned four sequels, with a fifth one in development, though its current status is unknown. The original film has been regarded as a cult classic to zombie fans.

== Plot ==
On July 3, 1984, at the Uneeda Medical Supply Warehouse in Louisville, Kentucky, foreman Frank Johnson tries to impress new employee Freddy Hanscom by showing him military drums of a toxic gas called Trioxin. The drums wound up in the basement of the building due to a delivery error years before. While hitting the side of a drum to prove it is secure, Frank accidentally unleashes the toxic gas, which seemingly melts the cadaver inside and reanimates another cadaver stored in a meat locker. The gas also reanimates other preserved specimens throughout the warehouse. Joined by their boss Burt Wilson, the three try, to no avail, to kill the reanimated corpse by puncturing the brain, then dismembering the body. They discover that every part of the zombie's body can survive independently. Burt has the zombie incinerated at a nearby mortuary crematorium by his friend Ernie Kaltenbrunner.

Meanwhile, Freddy's girlfriend Tina and his friends Spider, Trash, Chuck, Casey, Scuz and Suicide arrive at the cemetery across from the warehouse to wait for Freddy to finish work. While Trash starts stripping and dancing on a gravestone, the smoke from the cremated corpse carries Trioxin into the atmosphere. A thunderstorm returns the chemical to earth as toxic rain, reanimating the corpses in the nearby cemetery.

While searching for Freddy, Tina enters the warehouse basement, encountering the horribly disfigured cadaver from the barrel, later nicknamed "Tarman". The rest of the group arrives shortly after and saves her, but not before Tarman kills Suicide. The zombies emerge from their graves and attack and scatter the group, while also swarming and killing Trash. Chuck and Casey return to the warehouse while Spider, Tina and Scuz make their way to the mortuary through the cemetery, fighting off the re-emerging zombies as they go. Trash, her body submerged in the chemical-laden mud, rises from her grave transformed into a zombie and begins to hunt and feed.

At the mortuary, the three discover Frank and Freddy growing ill from their exposure to the gas and call for paramedics, who determine that the men are technically dead despite remaining conscious. When Burt and Ernie learn that the dead are rising from their graves, they barricade the mortuary. Scuz is killed while helping defend the barricade, and the zombies overwhelm and devour the paramedics and police officers who arrive on the scene. The group manages to capture the upper half of one of the zombies and restrain her on the mortuary table. She explains that the reanimated corpses can feel themselves rotting, and eating the brains of the living helps relieve the pain of being dead.

With Frank and Freddy showing signs of becoming zombies themselves, Burt has them locked in the chapel, accompanied by Tina when she refuses to abandon Freddy. Freddy soon attempts to eat Tina, prompting Burt, Ernie and Spider to rescue her by reopening the chapel and blinding Freddy with a strong acid. Frank manages to escape during the chaos and, still having control over his mind, commits suicide by climbing into the cremator.

Burt and Spider flee the mortuary in a police car but are forced back by the overwhelming number of zombies, now led by Trash. They eventually regroup with Chuck and Casey at the warehouse after escaping Tarman. Burt attempts to contact the police, only to learn they have been massacred after being overrun. He then decides to call the number on the military drums, which reaches military officer Colonel Horace Glover. Notified that the zombies have taken over the area, Glover orders the town destroyed by nuclear artillery on the morning of July 4, apparently killing Burt and the remaining survivors.

In the wake of the nuclear strike on Louisville, Colonel Glover tells his commanding officer that everything went as planned and that the results could not be more positive. Only a small area was destroyed, he says, and casualties are limited. Unbeknownst to him, however, fires from the nuclear explosion release Trioxin into the atmosphere just as the crematorium had, now over a much wider area. As he speaks, toxic rain begins falling once more, and zombies are heard screaming in their graves, indicating that the invasion is about to begin again.

== Cast ==
- Clu Gulager as Burt Wilson
- James Karen as Frank Johnson
- Don Calfa as Ernie Kaltenbrunner
- Thom Mathews as Freddy Hanscom
- Beverly Randolph as Tina
- Miguel A. Núñez Jr. as Spider
- John Philbin as Chuck
- Jewel Shepard as Casey
- Brian Peck as Scuz
- Linnea Quigley as Trash
- Mark Venturini as Suicide
- Jonathan Terry as Colonel Horace Glover
- Cathleen Cordell as Ethel Glover, Colonel's Wife
- Allan Trautman as Tarman Zombie
- John Durbin as The Zombie Who Calls for More Paramedics

== Production ==
=== Concept ===
The Return of the Living Dead has its roots in a novel by John Russo, simply titled Return of the Living Dead, which served as a follow-up to Night of the Living Dead (1968) which Russo co-scribed with George A. Romero. When Russo and Romero parted ways after Night of the Living Dead, Russo retained the rights to any titles featuring Living Dead while Romero was free to create his own series of sequels, beginning with Dawn of the Dead (1978). Russo and producer Tom Fox planned to bring Return of the Living Dead to the screen in 3D and directed by Tobe Hooper.

"I spent 37 years of my life not even being alive. Now I'm fulfilled."

— Dan O'Bannon, on marking his directorial-debut.

When Hemdale Film Corporation experienced difficulty raising funds for the movie and delayed the start of production, Hooper backed out to make Lifeforce (1985). Lifeforce co-screenwriter Dan O'Bannon was then brought in to give the early script a polish and was offered the director's seat, becoming his "first big film". He accepted on the condition he could rewrite the film radically so as to differentiate it from Romero's films. The film was the first production design credit for William Stout. The appearance of the zombies in the film was inspired by the mummies of Guanajuato, Mexico and the Bog People of Wales, as well as artwork from EC Comics.

The story's featured "2-4-5 Trioxin" chemical developed by the "Darrow Chemical Company" for the military was a play on the real-life Dow Chemical Company and its involvement in the 1960s with the manufacture of Agent Orange, scientifically known by the name "2,4,5-T Dioxin" and used in the US Military's Operation Ranch Hand and on Canada's CFB Gagetown Canadian Forces Base in rural New Brunswick during the Vietnam War as a powerful defoliant. Return of the Living Dead makes up a lighter purpose for the chemical's usage, with character Frank suggesting that it was being sprayed on cannabis crops in the 1960s.

=== Filming ===
Although the movie is set in Louisville, Kentucky, it was filmed in Burbank, Sylmar, and Downtown Los Angeles in California. The "Tarman" zombie is performed by actor and puppeteer Allan Trautman.

== Release ==
The Return of the Living Dead was initially set to open in Los Angeles and New York in September 1984 before gradually expanding through October, but following positive test screenings, Orion Pictures became confident enough to give it a wide release on August 16, 1985.

== Reception ==
The Return of the Living Dead was a moderate critical and a box office success, grossing approximately $14,237,000 domestically on an estimated budget of about $4 million.

The film holds a 71% approval rating on the review aggregate website Rotten Tomatoes based on 117 reviews. Its consensus reads: "The Return of the Living Dead is a gleefully grotesque horror-comedy, though its broad performances and cheap thrills sometimes detract from its sharper moments." Metacritic, which uses a weighted average, assigned the film a score of 66 out of 100, based on 12 critics, indicating "generally favorable" reviews. The film received four nominations at the 13th Saturn Awards in 1986: Best Horror Film, Best Actor for James Karen, Best Director for Dan O'Bannon, and Best Make-up for William Munns.

Roger Ebert gave the film three out of four stars, writing that the film is "kind of a sensation-machine, made out of the usual ingredients, and the real question is whether it's done with style. It is." Stephen Holden of The New York Times called the film a "mordant punk comedy," and stated that it "is by no means the ultimate horror movie it aspires to be."

Colin Greenland reviewed The Return of the Living Dead for White Dwarf, and stated that "The movie sprawls shapelessly but comfortably, with plenty of gruesome jokes."

Rotten Tomatoes lists the film on its 100 Best Zombie Movies, Ranked by Tomatometer.

== Soundtrack ==
1. "Surfin' Dead" by The Cramps
2. "Partytime (Zombie Version)" by 45 Grave
3. "Nothin' for You" by T.S.O.L.
4. "Eyes Without a Face" by The Flesh Eaters
5. "Burn the Flames" by Roky Erickson
6. "Dead Beat Dance" by The Damned
7. "Take a Walk" by Tall Boys
8. "Love Under Will" by Jet Black Berries
9. "Tonight (We'll Make Love Until We Die)" by SSQ
10. "Trash's Theme" by SSQ
11. "Young, Fast Iranians" by The F.U.’s: 1991 Hemdale version and subsequent DVD and Blu-ray Releases, though not on official soundtrack album.
12. "Partytime (Single Version)" by 45 Grave: Version actually used in the film, though not on official soundtrack album.
13. "Panzer Rollen in Afrika vor" by Norbert Schultze: Song playing on Ernie's walkman, though not on official soundtrack album.

== Home video ==
The film was distributed on home video during the 1980s and 1990s. In the United Kingdom, the British Board of Film Classification recorded video submissions from Vestron Video International in December 1985 and Tartan Video in August 1992. Tartan Video subsequently released the film on DVD in the United Kingdom on 19 March 2001.

In the United States, Metro-Goldwyn-Mayer released a special-edition DVD on 27 August 2002. It included widescreen and full-screen presentations, an audio commentary by writer-director Dan O'Bannon and production designer William Stout, a making-of documentary, trailers and television advertisements. MGM released a Collector's Edition in 2007 with additional commentaries and retrospective featurettes. The film made its American Blu-ray debut in 2010 as a Blu-ray and DVD combination release.

Several home-video editions altered the film's original soundtrack, including replacing licensed songs and modifying the voices of certain zombies. In 2012, Second Sight Films released a British Blu-ray edition featuring the original theatrical mono soundtrack as an alternative audio option. This restored material absent from previous American DVD and Blu-ray releases, including "Dead Beat Dance" by The Damned and the original voice of the Tar Man zombie. The release also included the documentary More Brains! A Return to the Living Dead and additional retrospective features.

In 2016, Shout! Factory's Scream Factory label released a Collector's Edition Blu-ray featuring a new 2K scan of the film's interpositive and additional retrospective material. The edition restored much of the original theatrical audio, although "Dead Beat Dance" remained unavailable because of music licensing restrictions.

Scream Factory released the film on Ultra HD Blu-ray on 18 October 2022, featuring a new 4K scan of the original camera negative, presented in Dolby Vision and HDR10, alongside previously released bonus features. On 13 October 2025, Arrow Video released a 4K Ultra HD edition in the United Kingdom, featuring a 4K restoration from the original negative, archival interviews, audio commentaries and a documentary about the film's production. As with the American releases, "Dead Beat Dance" was replaced because of music licensing restrictions.

== Legacy ==
Return of the Living Dead invented the theme of zombies craving brains. In a critical scene in the movie, a captured zombie explains that the zombies seek brains to relieve the pain of living death. It is a popular misconception that George Romero invented this specific trait as part of his Night of the Living Dead series, though he has emphasized that it was not his idea.

- The British punk/thrash quartet, Send More Paramedics, took their name from the film. They appeared on stage as zombies, apart from their drummer who wore a black luchador mask, and nearly all of their lyrics centered on zombie films.
- Jason Heveran of punk bands Mister Monster and Blitzkid took his stage surname “J~Sin Trioxin” from the film.
- The film has been spoofed in several episodes of the animated sitcom South Park, most notably "Pink Eye" that has recreations of key scenes and a similar central plot. The film's zombie cries of "Brains...more brains" were parodied in the episode "Night of the Living Homeless" where the town is overrun by homeless people who repeatedly ask for "change".
- In the fifth episode of The Simpsons' fourth season ("Treehouse of Horror III"), Bart & Lisa unwittingly unleash a horde of zombies upon Springfield. They break down the door searching for brains, but looking into Homer's ear, they rudely reject him after tapping his head & listening to the hollow echo inside. Zombie Principal Skinner summons Martin Prince to his office & reminds him to bring that "big, juicy chess club brain" of his.
- In the 10th episode of The Simpsons' 11th season ("Little Big Mom"), Bart and Homer believe they have leprosy and begin to act like zombies. When trying to ask Ned Flanders for help, they reach through the mail slot on his front door, saying, in a zombie-like voice, "Brains. Brains." Then Homer cheerfully says, "Use your brains to help us." Then, using the zombie-like voice again, he says, "Your delicious brains."
- In 2011, More Brains! A Return of the Living Dead Documentary was released on DVD.
- At the 91st Academy Awards, during the In Memoriam portion, a clip of the film was shown honoring James Karen.
