= Paul B. Cutler =

- Genres: Punk rock, horror punk, deathrock, gothic rock, Paisley Underground
- Occupations: Producer, guitarist, graphic designer
- Instruments: Guitar, bass

Paul B. Cutler is an American producer and guitarist, best known for his work with the Dream Syndicate and 45 Grave.

== Career ==
Cutler's first band, the Consumers, were the first punk rock band from Phoenix, Arizona. In 1979, he founded the punk and gothic band 45 Grave, who played off and on until 1990 and released several records. 45 Grave had formed alongside another Cutler band with almost the same lineup called Vox Pop, which released two singles.

In 1981, he played bass with the LAFMS-affiliated art group Bpeople, also producing and engineering their eponymous 1981 single, and producing and remixing their 1986 compilation album Petrified Conditions 1979-1981. In 1982, Cutler played on the Life Out on the Lawn 12" EP by Gleaming Spires; that same year, he engineered and produced the debut EP by Los Angeles-based Paisley Underground band the Dream Syndicate. Cutler became a member as lead guitarist for two Dream Syndicate albums, Out of the Grey (1986) and Ghost Stories (1988), before their 1989 demise.

Cutler produced the 1985 record Wonder Wonderful Wonderland by Plasticland, though purportedly his advice was "generally ignored".

From the late 1990s into the mid-2000s, Cutler collaborated with French percussionist Jean-Pierre Bedoyan on the avant-garde musical project International Metal Supply.

Cutler is no longer actively playing music, but has remained involved in the music industry. For at least two decades he worked as a graphic designer and art director for Goldenvoice, a music production company now owned by AEG. He is cited as being responsible for producing the "look and feel" of the Coachella Festival posters and themes.
