= Dinah Cancer =

American singer (born 1960)

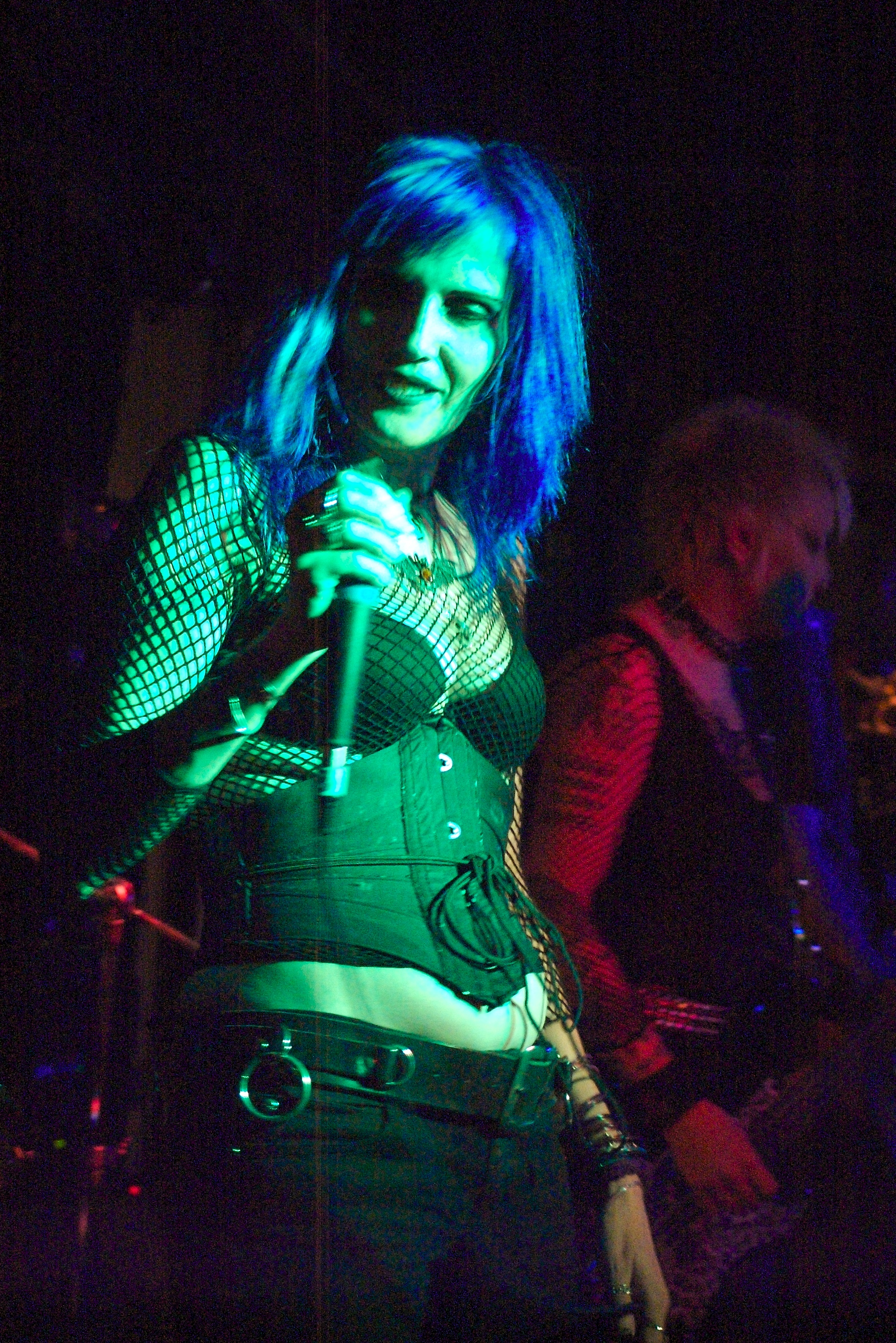
- Cancer in 2007

Background information
- Born: Mary Ann Sims; August 28, 1960 (age 65)
- Genres: Punk rock, horror punk, deathrock, gothic rock
- Occupation: Singer
- Years active: 1979–present

Mary Ann Sims (born August 28, 1960), known professionally as Dinah Cancer, is an American singer. She is the lead vocalist of 45 Grave, which helped found the deathrock music genre.

== Biography ==
Cancer remarried briefly and had two daughters before separating from her second husband. She returned to using her birth name, Mary Sims, becoming a preschool teacher and running the Ragnarok occult bookstore. In 1997, she formed the band Penis Flytrap, who released the mini album Tales of Terror (1998, Bloody Daggre Records) and the album Dismemberment (2001, Black Plague Records). Cancer and drummer Hal Satan left Penis Flytrap to form Dinah Cancer and the Grave Robbers.

In 2004, 45 Grave reformed for their 25th anniversary, with Cancer as the only original member. Cancer said via her MySpace page: "I'm building this to keep the spirit of 45 Grave alive, introduce its magic to new fans, and as a personal commemorative of my best memories being the driving force and front person of 45 Grave". The reformed 45 Grave (featuring Rikk Agnew and later Frank Agnew) performed the title track to the 2009 horror film Night of the Demons, and released their second studio album, Pick Your Poison, in 2012 on Frontier Records.
