= Justin Raisen =

American record producer and songwriter

Justin Louis Raisen is an American record producer, songwriter, multi-instrumentalist, and mixing engineer.

== Career ==
Raisen co-produced Sky Ferreira's debut album Night Time, My Time with Ariel Rechtshaid in 2013. That year, he co-wrote "Nuclear Seasons" on Charli XCX's album True Romance. He co-wrote and produced the title track on Charli XCX's album Sucker in 2014.

In 2016, Raisen co-produced Angel Olsen's album My Woman. He also produced Kim Gordon's debut solo single "Murdered Out" that year.

Raisen co-produced Lawrence Rothman's album The Book of Law in 2017. He co-produced Yves Tumor's album Safe in the Hands of Love in 2018. In 2019, Raisen produced Kim Gordon's debut solo album No Home Record.

Raisen co-founded the record label KRO Records with Lawrence Rothman and Yves Rothman in 2019. Raisen co-produced Yves Tumor's album Heaven to a Tortured Mind in 2020.

Raisen produced Kim Gordon's album The Collective in 2024. The album received two Grammy Award nominations for Best Alternative Music Album and Best Alternative Music Performance ("BYE BYE") at the 67th Annual Grammy Awards. Raisen produced Gordon's follow-up album Play Me in 2026. He co-produced Violet Grohl's debut album Be Sweet to Me in 2026; Grohl is the daughter of Foo Fighters frontman Dave Grohl.

In 2026, Raisen contributed to the soundtrack for Wuthering Heights, collaborating with Charli XCX and Finn Keane on multiple songs including "Chains of Love."

In 2019, Raisen and his brother Jeremiah stated that Lizzo's single "Truth Hurts" used elements from their song "Healthy" without credit, leading to litigation between the two sides. The dispute was resolved with a confidential settlement in March 2022, each side bearing its own legal costs.

== Selected discography ==
- 2011 — Theophilus London — Timez Are Weird These Days — co-writer, "Why Even Try"
- 2013 — Sky Ferreira — Night Time, My Time — co-producer (with Ariel Rechtshaid)
- 2013 — Charli XCX — True Romance — co-writer, "Nuclear Seasons"
- 2014 — Charli XCX — Sucker — co-writer, producer, "Sucker"
- 2015 — HEALTH — "Life" (Death Magic) — co-producer, co-writer
- 2016 — Angel Olsen — My Woman — co-producer
- 2016 — Santigold — "Who I Thought You Were" (99¢) — co-producer
- 2017 — Lawrence Rothman — The Book of Law — co-producer
- 2018 — Yves Tumor — Safe in the Hands of Love — co-producer, engineer
- 2019 — Kim Gordon — No Home Record — producer
- 2019 — Joji — "Sanctuary" — producer, writer (RIAA Gold)
- 2020 — Yves Tumor — Heaven to a Tortured Mind — co-producer
- 2022 — Yeah Yeah Yeahs — Cool It Down — co-producer, engineer
- 2022 — Charli XCX — Crash — producer, writer, "Baby"
- 2022 — Spoon — Lucifer on the Sofa — contributing production, "Feels Alright"
- 2022 — Grace Ives — Janky Star — co-producer
- 2023 — Lil Yachty — Let's Start Here — co-producer, engineer
- 2023 — Drake — "Away From Home" (For All the Dogs) — writer, producer
- 2023 — Nicki Minaj — "Blessings" (Pink Friday 2) — co-producer, co-writer
- 2023 — John Cale — MERCY — mixing engineer (tracks 7, 10, 12)
- 2024 — Kim Gordon — The Collective — producer
- 2024 — The Voidz — Like All Before You — co-producer
- 2024 — Kid Cudi — "BLUE SKY" (Insano) — producer, writer
- 2024 — Kid Cudi — "SUPERBOY" (Insano (NITRO MEGA)) — writer
- 2024 — Magdalena Bay — "Love Is Everywhere" (Imaginal Disk) — additional producer
- 2024 — Noga Erez — The Vandalist — co-producer, co-writer
- 2025 — Ariel Pink — With You Every Night — co-producer
- 2025 — Cruz Beckham — "Optics" / "Lick the Toad" — co-producer
- 2026 — Charli XCX / Finn Keane — Wuthering Heights soundtrack — co-producer, co-writer
- 2026 — Kim Gordon — Play Me — producer
- 2026 — Violet Grohl — Be Sweet to Me — co-producer
- 2026 — Modest Mouse — "Rotten Fruit" (An Eraser and a Maze) — additional production, featured artist

== Awards and honours ==
Year	Award	Category	Work	Result
2025	Grammy Award	Best Alternative Music Album	The Collective	Nominated
2025	Grammy Award	Best Alternative Music Performance	"BYE BYE"	Nominated
