= Mark Ibold =

American bass guitarist (born 1962)

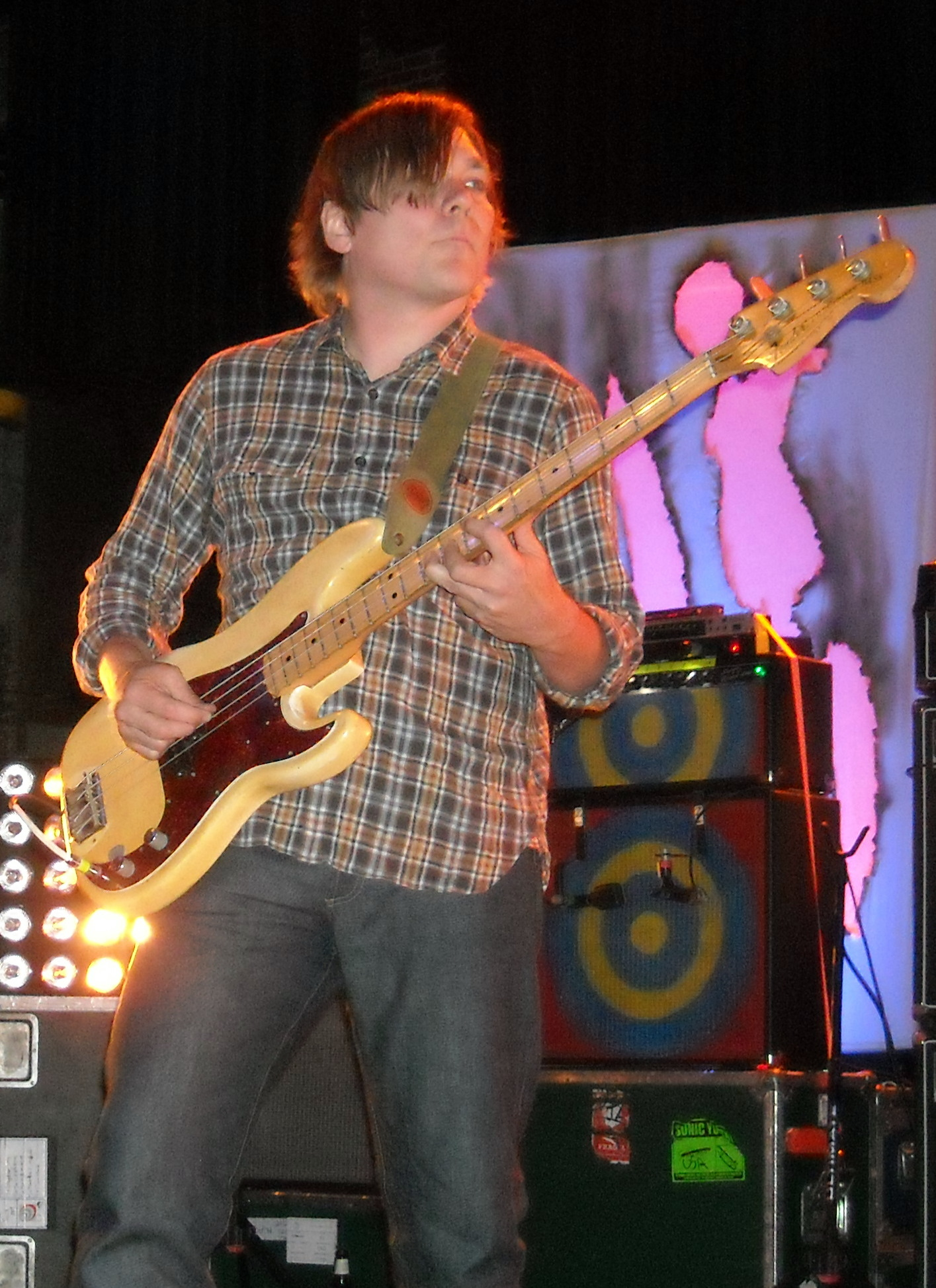
- Ibold performing with Sonic Youth in 2009

Background information
- Born: Mark Alan Ibold; October 17, 1962 (age 63)
- Occupations: Musician, bartender
- Instruments: Bass guitar, guitar

Mark Alan Ibold (born October 17, 1962) is an American musician. He is best known as the bass guitarist of the indie rock band Pavement, with whom he recorded four studio albums. Following Pavement's initial break-up in 1999, Ibold joined the alternative rock band Sonic Youth from 2006 until their end in 2011.

== Career ==
Based in New York, Ibold's other musical projects have included Dustdevils, of which he was a member in the late 1980s and early 1990s, and Free Kitten, which included Sonic Youth's Kim Gordon, Pussy Galore's Julie Cafritz and Boredoms' Yoshimi P-We.

In 2006, Ibold joined Sonic Youth on their Rather Ripped tour, and as of their 2009 album The Eternal, was a full participating member of the band until they split up in 2011.

== Other activities ==
Ibold was a bartender at "Great Jones Cafe" in New York City until its closure.

He was listed in the closing credits as "Wardrobe Assistant" on Comedy Central's Strangers with Candy, and made several cameo appearances on the show. In 2006, he was published as the "male hand model" in Strangers with Candy star Amy Sedaris' book I Like You: Hospitality Under the Influence.

In the late 2010s his food columns could be read in David Chang's now defunct Lucky Peach magazine. He is a known foodie in the world of indie rock music. Ibold even spent a year traveling the world, trying new foods with Sonic Youth.

At the time of Pavement's 2022 reunion, Ibold was working as a bartender in New York City: "My mind races sometimes when people come up to me at work. What are they thinking? 'Oh God, this guy’s been in two bands that mean the world to me, but he's serving drinks behind a bar?' Maybe we help put things into perspective – that there are few artists left not named Jagger or McCartney who have no financial worries. But still: I'd drop my shifts for Pavement any day of the week."

== Discography ==
with Pavement

- Watery, Domestic (EP) (1992)
- Crooked Rain, Crooked Rain (1994)
- Wowee Zowee (1995)
- Brighten the Corners (1997)
- Terror Twilight (1999)

with Sonic Youth

- The Eternal (2009)

with Free Kitten

- Unboxed (1994)
- Nice Ass (1995)
- Sentimental Education (1997)
