= Be Sweet to Me =

Studio album by Violet Grohl
- Released: May 29, 2026
- Recorded: August 2024 – May 2025
- Studios: Justin Raisen (Los Angeles); Quail (Joshua Tree)
- Genre: Alternative rock
- Length: 31:57
- Labels: Auroura; Republic
- Producers: Justin Raisen; Anthony Paul Lopez; Joe Kennedy; Brad Lauchert

Singles from Be Sweet to Me
- 1. "Thum" / "Applefish" Released: December 7, 2025; 2. "595" Released: March 11, 2026; 3. "Cool Buzz" Released: April 28, 2026

Be Sweet to Me is the debut studio album by the American singer-songwriter Violet Grohl, released on May 29, 2026, through Auroura and Republic Records. Co-produced primarily by Justin Raisen and Anthony Paul Lopez, the album was recorded from August 2024 to May 2025 mainly at Raisen's Los Angeles home studio with a Wrecking Crew-like group of studio musicians. Be Sweet to Me is primarily an alternative rock album, with a sound indebted to the 1990s. Grohl cited the Breeders, PJ Harvey, Pixies, Soundgarden, and Cocteau Twins as her primary musical influences for the album.

The album was preceded by three singles: "Thum", "595", and "Cool Buzz". The singles and album track "Bug in the Cake" were supported by music videos. Grohl promoted the album through various interviews and is set to tour the United States and Canada in 2026. Music critics generally described the album as a strong debut and one that reflects Grohl's 1990s alternative rock influences and lineage.

== Background ==
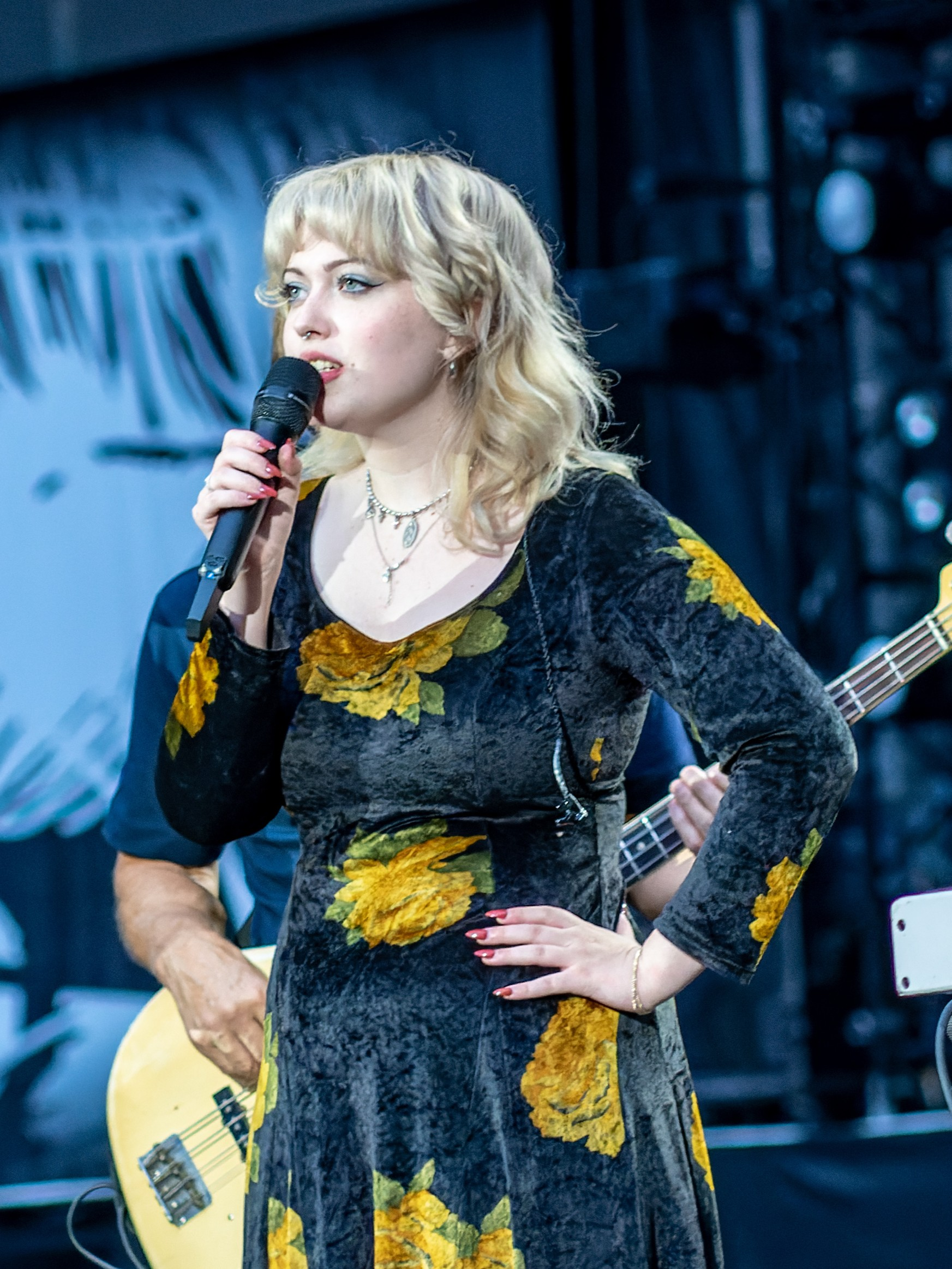
Grohl in 2022

As the eldest daughter of Foo Fighters frontman Dave Grohl, Violet Grohl said in an interview that she does not care about her status as a nepo baby:

"Obviously, doors are open for me because of my last name," she eye-rolls. "It's not something I'm ever going to hide behind [...] I don't care – I really don't. I've heard that since I was 13 years old. So call me a nepo baby all you want. It's 'whatever' to me. I just hope that eventually people will give me a shot."

Before recording her debut album, Grohl released a cover of X's "Nausea" with her father in 2021. She also contributed backing vocals to Foo Fighters' songs "Making a Fire" (2021) and "Show Me How" (2023), and performed live with the band at the Taylor Hawkins tribute concert in 2022 and the Glastonbury Festival in 2023. (Note: Attributed to multiple references:) While always wanting a career in music, Grohl specifically mentioned that her time recording "Show Me How" gave her the insight and confidence to pursue a solo career.

== Recording ==
Grohl recorded Be Sweet to Me from August 2024 to May 2025 primarily at producer Justin Raisen's Los Angeles home studio with a Wrecking Crew-like group of studio musicians. Grohl contacted Raisen, whose previous collaborators included Kim Gordon, Charli XCX, and Lil Yachty, through her father after a Gordon show in Copenhagen. The two formed an immediate mutual connection: "He was pulling these references – things that are really near and dear to me, or that maybe the average listener might not know – and I just thought: 'Okay, this is who I should be working with'." Raisen co-produced the album with Anthony Paul Lopez, with additional production from Joe Kennedy on "Last Day I Loved You" and Brad Lauchert on "Pool of My Dreams".

Grohl explained that the musicians were close friends and frequent collaborators of Raisen's: "They're the coolest, most talented, genuine music lovers, and seriously talented musicians ... I'd never been in that kind of recording environment before. Everyone would throw out ideas, or I would share a reference, and whatever it was about the song, [we'd ask] how we can build and make it a completely new, different thing." Grohl did not play any instruments on the album, saying that she felt shy and outclassed by the skilled musicians around her. All of the album's songs originated from jam sessions. On the songwriting process, Grohl said the songs were built around "inspiration playlists" that she brought to the studio: "[W]e would hang and listen for a little while, and then start writing." Before her debut, Grohl's songwriting process was more solitary than collaborative. Nevertheless, she expressed appreciation for the collaborative recording process, finding others' input helped give her motivation and insight into making better music.

The first song recorded was "Thum", followed by "Plastic Couch". A few weeks were spent recording the album's intense tracks, including "Cool Buzz" and "Often Others", before Grohl decided she wanted songs with a heavier emotional weight, resulting in "Mobile Star", "Pool of My Dreams", and "Applefish", which were sonically inspired by the spacious atmospheres of Cocteau Twins and This Mortal Coil.

== Composition ==
Featuring 11 tracks, Be Sweet to Me is primarily an alternative rock album, with elements of grunge, heavy metal, shoegaze, punk, folk, and jazz. Its sound was compared directly to the music of the 1990s, particularly the alt-rock sound her father was a part of. Mojo magazine's Stephen Thomas Erlewine "marr[ies] the etheral swoon of dream-pop with the crunch of grunge, creating a fusion that evokes the off-kilter spirit of the '90s." Grohl cited the Breeders, Hole, PJ Harvey, Pixies, Soundgarden, and Cocteau Twins as her primary musical influences for the album. She described this period of music as "powerful", with themes and visuals that are "authentic and raw". Comparisons were also made to her father Dave Grohl's former band Nirvana, Veruca Salt, and Queens of the Stone Age. The Music's Mary Varvaris described the production as "unshakably heavy, with fuzzed-out, gritty guitars and hard-hitting drums swirling around Grohl's tender voice."

Lyrically, Be Sweet to Me is filled with film imagery and Lynchian surrealism, relying on symbolism to tell coming of age stories. In interviews, Grohl discussed her love of David Lynch, finding "relatability" in his work; Lynch's influence can be heard on "595", whilst "Often Others" references Twin Peaks. Grohl explained that because she often used visual and symbolic imagery in her music, her songs combined her love of cinema and music. Daisy Carter of DIY wrote that the lyrics "revel in relative ambiguity; rather than spoon-feeding the listener, they zoom in on diverse details [...] using them as microcosmic explorations of grief, desire, and identity." "Cool Buzz" was inspired by Grohl's experiences with misogyny and enriched by stories shared by friends. There are also themes of romance and mourning.

The album's title came from an in-joke between Grohl and her best friend during playful banter. She further said that the phrase could "be seen as a pretext for the album. Just ... be sweet." The album's cover photograph and accompanying promotional images were taken by the photographer Bella Newman.

== Release and promotion ==
The album was preceded by the singles "Thum" b/w "Applefish", released on December 7, 2025, followed by "595" on March 11, 2026, and "Cool Buzz" on April 28. Music videos were released for the singles. For "Thum" and "595", Grohl worked with the director Nikki Milan Houston, who developed the videos' visuals based on ideas from Grohl; Houston also directed the video for "Cool Buzz". The video for "Bug in the Cake" features the pornographic film actress Nina Hartley as Grohl's grandmother. The album was released on May 29, through Republic Records and Grohl's own imprint, Auroura Records.

To promote the album, Grohl conducted interviews with numerous publications across America, Europe, and Asia. These included Consequence, Dork, DIY, The Forty-Five, Kerrang!, Nylon, The Music Australia, RockUrLife, and Rock Sound. On her extensive promotion, Grohl said: "If you want to put yourself out there, you have to put yourself out there." She made her solo television debut on The Tonight Show Starring Jimmy Fallon on June 3, 2026, performing "Bug in the Cake". To support Be Sweet to Me, Grohl is set to embark on headlining tour dates across the United States and Canada through fall 2026, while also supporting the Breeders on other select shows.

== Critical reception ==
Professional ratings
Aggregate scores
Source	Rating
Metacritic	76/100
Review scores
Source	Rating
AllMusic	3.5/5 stars
Clash	8/10
Classic Pop	4/5 stars
Classic Rock	3.5/5 stars
Exclaim!	8/10
The Guardian	3/5 stars
Kerrang!	4/5
The Line of Best Fit	8/10
Mojo	4/5 stars
Musikexpress	3.5/6 stars
Paste	C−

According to the review aggregator Metacritic, Be Sweet to Me received "generally favorable reviews" based on a weighted average score of 76 out of 100 from ten critic scores. Critics generally described the album as a strong debut and one that reflects Grohl's 1990s alternative rock influences and lineage. (Note: Attributed to multiple references:) AllMusic's Neil Z. Young argued that Be Sweet to Me could "serve as an entry point for younger generations to discover the music of those older inspirations". Writing for Clash magazine, Paulina Subia praised Grohl's musical range and vocal performances, ultimately saying: "With this album, Grohl takes command of her sound with an evident thrill for how music can be imbued with a spectrum of emotion; and, in turn, Be Sweet to Me becomes unforgettable." Erlewine similarly praised Grohl's vocals, saying she successfully adapted to different musical styles.

Many critics believed Grohl successfully broke away from her father's shadow and established herself as a creative talent. (Note: Attributed to multiple references:) Writing for Exclaim!, David James Young wrote that Grohl distinguished herself from her family's legacy, at the same time demonstrated technical proficiency and proved she is an artist worthy of attention. The Line of Best Fit's Marie Hascoët was eager to hear where Grohl would go next. She commended the album's music and lyrics as vibrant and imaginative and believed Grohl had a promising future ahead of her.

In a more mixed assessment, The Guardian's Katie Hawthorne wrote that the nostalgic music was "too reverent [and] too predictable", concluding, "Grohl's a genuine talent, but her hungry threats need sharper fangs." More negatively, Grace Robins-Somerville of Paste magazine found that Grohl's 1990s-influenced sound failed to set her apart from her Gen Z alt-rock peers, ultimately writing: "It's natural for a young artist to wear their influences like armor on the way to figuring out how to make certain sounds their own, but on Violet Grohl's debut album, these influences are wearing her." In the Dutch music magazine Oor, Reinier Van Der Zouw hoped that Grohl would take more creative risks and not copy others for her next record, but believed the album was enjoyable and proved she has potential.

== Track listing ==
Be Sweet to Me track listing
No.	Title	Writer(s)	Producer(s)	Length
1.	"Thum"	Violet Grohl; Joe Kennedy; Anthony Paul Lopez; Justin Raisen	Lopez; Raisen	2:11
2.	"595"	Grohl; Kennedy; Brad Lauchert; Raisen; Julio Tavárez; Joseph Zizzo	Lopez; Raisen	2:29
3.	"Bug in the Cake"	Grohl; Ainjel Emme; Lopez; Kennedy; Raisen	Lopez; Raisen	2:48
4.	"Last Day I Loved You"	Grohl; Kennedy; Raisen	Kennedy; Lopez; Raisen	2:39
5.	"Big Memory"	Grohl; Emme; Kennedy; Lopez; Raisen; Tavárez	Lopez; Raisen	2:47
6.	"Mobile Star"	Grohl; Kennedy; Raisen; Tavárez	Raisen; Lopez^{[a]}	3:23
7.	"Often Others"	Grohl; Raisen; Tavárez; Zizzo	Lopez; Raisen	2:30
8.	"Applefish"	Grohl; Emme; Lauchert; Lopez; Kennedy; Raisen	Lopez; Raisen	2:40
9.	"Cool Buzz"	Grohl; Lauchert; Kennedy; Raisen; Tavárez; Zizzo	Lopez; Raisen	2:32
10.	"Pool of My Dreams"	Grohl; Raisen; Tavárez	Lauchert; Raisen; Lopez^{[a]}	3:17
11.	"Plastic Couch"	Grohl; Emme; Lopez; Kennedy; Raisen; Tavárez	Lopez; Raisen	4:41
Total length:				31:57

Notes

- ^{^[a]} signifies an additional producer
- "Thum" is stylized in all caps

== Personnel ==
Credits are adapted from liner notes and Tidal.

=== Musicians ===
- Violet Grohl – vocals (all tracks), background vocals (track 8)
- Justin Raisen – background vocals (1, 9); bass guitar, additional drums (1); guitar (2–5, 7–9); foley (6), noise guitar (7, 11); reverse percussion, effects, blip box, synthesizer (6); additional vocals, vocal effects (9); drum machine, electronic percussion (10); feedback (11)
- Anthony Paul Lopez – drums (1–6, 8–11), guitar (2–5, 8–10), additional guitar (1), percussion (1, 4, 5, 9, 11); synthesizer (6, 10); foley (6, 11); background vocals (6)
- Joe Kennedy – guitar (1–6, 8, 9, 11), bass synthesizer (2, 6), bass guitar (4); Mellotron, toy piano (6)
- Julio Tavárez – bass guitar (2, 5–7, 9, 11), guitar (2, 5, 7, 9, 10), beatboxing (6); bass synthesizer, drums, synthesizer (10)
- Ainjel Emme – guitar (3–5, 7, 8, 11), bass guitar (3, 5, 8), background vocals (5, 8, 11)
- Persia Numan – background vocals (3)
- Joseph P. Zizzo – drums (7)
- Brad Lauchert – guitar, keyboards (10)
- Shane Hawkins – additional drums (11)

=== Technical ===
- Justin Raisen – production
- Anthony Paul Lopez – production, engineering, mixing
- Joe Kennedy – production (4)
- Ainjel Emme – vocal production (all tracks), additional engineering (8)
- Brad Lauchert – production (10), engineering (all tracks)
- Mike Bozzi – mastering

=== Artwork ===
- Samuel Burgess-Johnson – art direction and design
- Bella Newman – photography

== Charts ==
Chart performance for Be Sweet to Me
Chart (2026)	Peak position
Australian Albums (ARIA)	90
Belgian Albums (Ultratop Flanders)	39
Belgian Albums (Ultratop Wallonia)	137
French Physical Albums (SNEP)	82
French Rock & Metal Albums (SNEP)	19
Scottish Albums (Official Charts)	18
UK Albums Sales (OCC)	16
US Top Album Sales (Billboard)	37
