= Bill Nace =

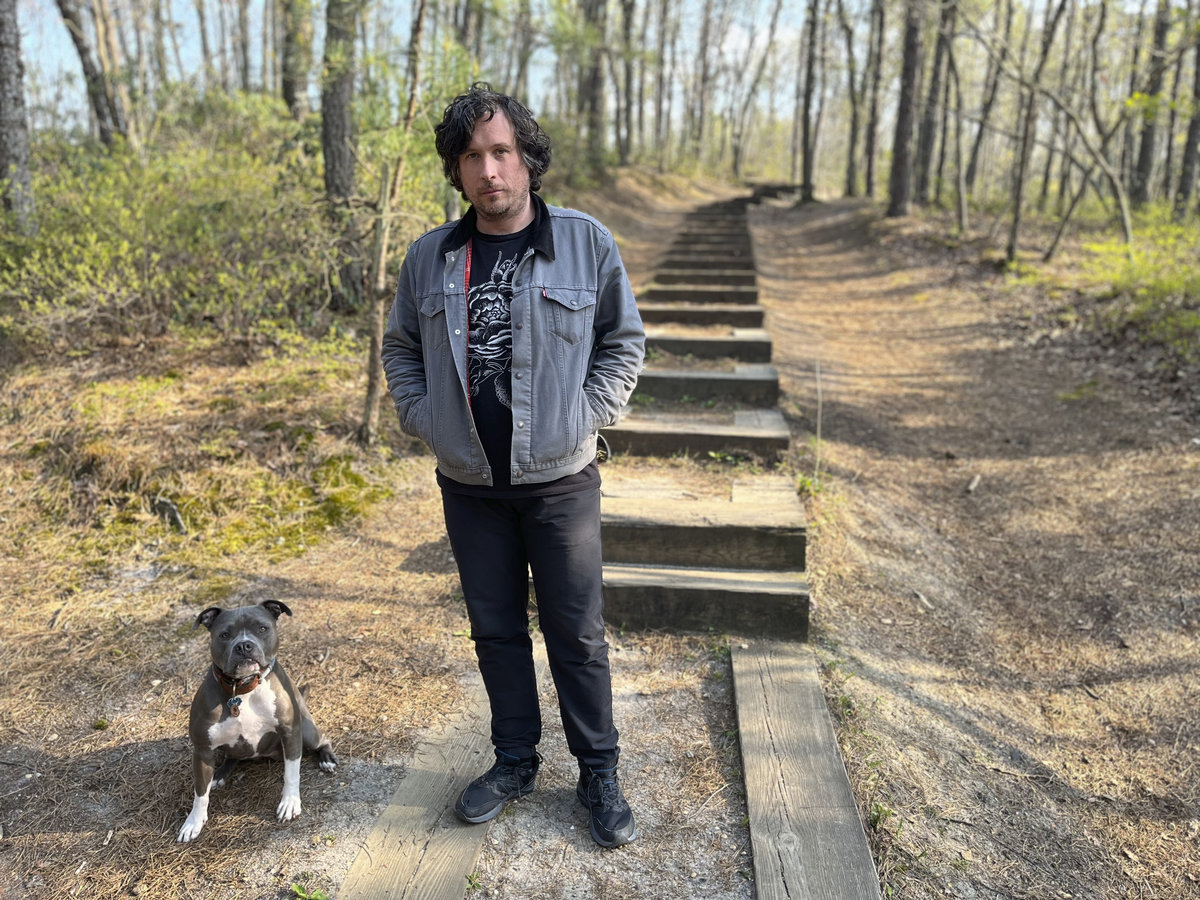

Background information
- Genres: Avant-garde jazz, free jazz, experimental
- Occupations: Musician; record label owner
- Instruments: Guitar, Taishōgoto
- Labels: Open Mouth; 8mm; Ecstatic Peace!; Matador; Feeding Tube; Ultra Eczema
- Member of: Body/Head
- Website: billnace.bandcamp.com

Bill Nace is an American experimental guitarist and visual artist, from New Jersey. Nace has collaborated with Joe McPhee, Steve Gunn, Thurston Moore, Yoko Ono, Okkyung Lee, and Kim Gordon. With Gordon, Nace is part of the experimental electric guitar duo Body/Head.

Nace is known for an unorthodox approach to the electric guitar, often using preparations, extended techniques, and unconventional objects to generate sound. The Chicago Reader described his playing as producing "unguitarlike sounds," favoring dense sustained tones and noise textures over conventional melody or rhythm. Pitchfork, reviewing his 2020 solo album Both, described the record as capturing "long plumes of feedback and static, with Nace coaxing the guitar into making sounds more akin to a broken synthesizer." The Aquarium Drunkard noted that his work spans both solo improvisation and extended collaborative sessions, and that his approach has remained consistent across decades of output on a wide range of independent labels.

He currently runs a label called Open Mouth Records, out of Philadelphia. He is also a prolific visual artist; drawing, designing various shirts, album covers, and flyers.

== Discography ==
- Too Dead for Dreaming (8mm, 2010)
- Both (Drag City, 2020)
- Through a Room (Drag City, 2022)

With Body/Head

- Coming Apart (Matador, 2013)
- Live Hassle (Feeding Tube, 2016)
- No Waves (Matador, 2016)
- The Switch (Matador, 2018)
- Body/Dilloway/Head (with Aaron Dilloway; Three Lobed Recordings, 2021)

With X.O.4

- All Alien Part One (Open Mouth, 2004)
- X.O.4 (Audiobot 2005)
- Cataracts (Ecstatic Peace!, 2007)
- Lost Signals (Ultra Eczema, 2007)
- Exile (Open Mouth, 2010)

With Paul Flaherty

- Untitled (Ecstatic Peace!, 2008)
- An Airless Field (Ecstatic Peace!, 2010)
- No, the Sun (Open Mouth, 2011)
- Broken Staircase (Wet Paint Music 2011)

With Evan Parker

- Branches (Otoruko / Open Mouth, 2025)

With David Watson

- On Bats (Amish Records, 2026)

=== As sideman ===
- Susan Alcorn, Live at Rotunda (Open Mouth, 2019)
- Chris Corsano, Mystic Beings (Open Mouth, 2018)
- Myriam Gendron, Ma délire: Song of love, lost & found (2021)
- Myriam Gendron, Mayday (2024)
- Kim Gordon, Sound for Andy Warhol's KISS (Andy Warhol Museum 2019)
- Okkyung Lee, Live at Stone (Open Mouth, 2015)
- Samara Lubelski, Samara Lubelski & Bill Nace (Open Mouth, 2018)
- Samara Lubelski, Live in Belchertown (Open Mouth, 2019)
- Joe McPhee, Last Notes (Open Mouth, 2013)
- Wally Shoup, One End to the Other (Open Mouth, 2015)
