= Inherit =

Inherit or Inherited may refer to:

- Inheritance, passing on of property after someone's death
- Heredity, passing of genetic traits to offspring
- Inheritance (object-oriented programming), way to compartmentalize and re-use computer code
- Inherit (album), 2008 work by the group Free Kitten
- Inherit (film), 2026 Thai film
- Inherited (script), name for dependent script characters, like diacritics (ISO code Zinh)
- InHerit, online portal of the Heritage Council of Western Australia
- Inherited (film) Iranian film of 2026
