= Play Me (disambiguation) =

"Play Me" is a song by Neil Diamond, covered by various artists

Play Me may also refer to:

- Play Me (Harry Belafonte album), 1973
- Play Me, an album by Korean band Eve
- Play Me (Kim Gordon album), 2026
- "Play Me", a song by Korn featuring rapper Nas from Take a Look in the Mirror
