= Grohl (surname) =

Grohl is a surname of German origin. Notable people with the surname include:

- Dave Grohl (born January 14, 1969), American rock musician and songwriter
- Violet Grohl (born April 15, 2006), American musician and singer
