= Unboxed =

Unboxed may refer to:

- Being outside or removed from a box
- Unboxed (Free Kitten album)
- Unboxed: Creativity in the UK, 2022 innovation expo popularly known as the "Festival of Brexit"
- Unboxed (Sammy Hagar album)
