= The Book of Law =

The Book of Law may refer to:

- The Book of Law (film), a 2009 Iranian film
- The Book of Law (album), a 2017 album by Lawrence Rothman.
