= No Waves =

Live album by Body/Head
- Released: November 11, 2016
- Recorded: March 24, 2014, Bijou Theater, Nashville, Tennessee
- Genre: Experimental rock
- Length: 39:58
- Label: Matador
- Producer: Body/Head

Body/Head chronology
Coming Apart (2013)	No Waves (2016)	The Switch (2018)

No Waves is a live album by the American experimental rock duo Body/Head and was released on Matador Records on November 11, 2016. Recorded during a performance at the Big Ears Festival in Knoxville, Tennessee, the album features improvised versions of material taken from the duo's first studio album Coming Apart and the single "The Show Is Over". It continues the project's trend of rejecting traditional musical structures and utilizing various methods of distorting their sound.

== Background ==
In 2013, Body/Head received high-praise for the free structure and improvisation found on their debut album Coming Apart, which drew comparisons to early releases by bassist Kim Gordon's former band, Sonic Youth. At the time the material on No Waves was recorded, the duo was performing live at the Bijou Theater for the 2014 Big Ears Festival in Knoxville, Tennessee to promote the release of Coming Apart. Since the project formed in 2012, Body/Head has only arranged a limited touring schedule, making the album a rare glimpse into the act's live prowess.

Guitarist Bill Nace explained in an interview for Rolling Stone magazine that the album's good sound-quality resulted from "microphones on the amps, not post-production whitewashing". He added "this particular raw mix had a certain character that held together as a whole". The three tracks on No Waves have all previously appeared on past Body/Head releases, albeit in different structural forms: "The Show Is Over" is the A-side of a single distributed in 2014, and "Abstract Actress" is a medley of the two Coming Apart songs. Music critic Andy Cush notes that, rather than attempting to replicate their studio work, the duo "treat the songs as rough outlines for further improvision, to be colored in as the musicians please".

The duo is following the release of No Waves with a brief four-date tour in the US.

== Track listing ==
1. "Sugar Water" - 7:48
2. "The Show Is Over" - 8:31
3. "Abstract/Actress" - 23:39
