= Nice Ass =

Studio album by Free Kitten
- Released: January 16, 1995
- Studios: Mott Street (New York City); Snacktime (Hoboken, New Jersey)
- Genres: Punk rock; noise rock; riot grrrl; alternative rock
- Length: 32:38
- Labels: Kill Rock Stars; Wiiija

Free Kitten chronology
Unboxed (1994)	Nice Ass (1995)	Punks Suing Punks (1996)

Singles from Nice Ass
- 1. "Harvest Spoon" Released: January 9, 1995

Nice Ass is the debut studio album by American rock band Free Kitten, released on January 16, 1995, through Wiiija Records in Europe and Kill Rock Stars in North America. The band's first full-length release with bassit Mark Ibold and drummer Yoshimi P-We, it is a punk rock, noise rock, and riot grrrl album featuring a distorted, lo-fi sound and lyrics referencing and making fun of contemporary rock music and pop culture. Free Kitten promoted Nice Ass with the release of one single, "Harvest Spoon", and a headlining tour of the United Kingdom in January 1995. The album received mixed reviews from contemporary music critics, whom offered divided opinions on its musicianship and lyrics, whilst retrospective reviews have commented favorably on its feminist themes and attitude.

== Background and release ==
Free Kitten was formed in 1992 by Kim Gordon of Sonic Youth and Julia Cafritz of Pussy Galore as a two-piece guitar band inspired primarily by Royal Trux. After releasing a few singles, Boredoms drummer Yoshimi P-We joined the band in 1993, with Pavement bassist Mark Ibold joining in 1994. With the exception of "Harvest Spoon", which was recorded at Snacktime Studios with Fred, the songs on Nice Ass were recorded on Mott Street and mixed at Stellar Music in New York City by Kenny Lienhardt. Gordon and Cafritz would improvise songs in the studio with Yoshimi, leaving Ibold to make up his own parts, before overdubbing vocals and mixing their songs. Nice Ass was released in Europe through Wiiija Records on January 16, 1995, and in North America by Kill Rock Stars on January 23, 1995. The album was supported by one single, "Harvest Spoon", which was released as the launch title of a Wiiija' 99p singles club on January 9, 1995, and a short headlining tour of the United Kingdom that month.

== Composition ==
Nice Ass is a punk rock, noise rock, and riot grrrl album featuring a distorted, lo-fi sound and songs centered around two-or-three guitar riffs, simple "pounding" rhythms and vocals patterns that Johnathan Dixon of The Boston Phoenix likened to "sing-songy chants of playground jump-rope games." Cafritz and Gordon employ more singing than on Free Kitten's previous releases; three songs feature rapping, with "Call Back (Episode XXI)" and "Scratch tha DJ" incorporating beat poetry-style vocals from Gordon. Colin Larkin of The Encyclopedia of Popular Music described the album as having placed the "experimental nature" of Free Kitten's output within a "more disciplined, rock-based structure"; Sascha Kösch of Spex said that the band's songs, "minimal as they are, are becoming more and more like songs". Its lyrics reference and make fun of contemporary rock music and pop culture, addressing sexism, performing and touring, college radio, music critics, and braggadocious male rappers. In an interview with Melody Maker, Cafritz said: "The jokes [on the album] are right there for you to fucking understand. [...] I like to amuse myself. There has to be something there that makes the pen move across the paper. I'm not going to censor myself – even if that laugh is occasionally at the expense of someone else."

The opening track "Harvest Spoon" was reportedly inspired by Sonic Youth's and Gordon's experiences with sexism backstage whilst supporting Neil Young & Crazy Horse on the band's Ragged Glory Tour in 1991, with its title being a "derisive nod" to Young's Harvest album. Gordon additionally alludes to Liz Phair in its lyrics, remarking that she is "outside of guysville". "Rock of Ages" sees Cafritz and Gordon sing about the "pathetic" state of rock and name drop various alternative artists including Beck and Trent Reznor, along with their ages and "sins". On "Proper Band", they chant monotonously about clichés of the music industry. "Blindfold Test" features a "da-da" refrain that Sarra Manning of Melody Maker compared with the Beach Boys and the Ronettes. "Revlon Liberation Orchestra" sees Gordon and Cafritz rap over a drum machine and vocal loop repeating the lyric "oppression killin' me soft and sexy"; according to journalist Maria Raha, the song's "hypnotic" repetition of cosmetic advertising slogans "reduces [them] to the ridiculous, and then the meaningless, liberating the listener from the stranglehold of advertising's exploitation." "Scratch tha DJ" recalls Ciccone Youth's The Whitey Album and features a "surreal rap-rant" from Gordon about Free Kitten "saving the world from Stone Temple rockwank", according to Stephen Dalton of NME. The album's final track, "Alan Licked Has Ruined Music for an Entire Generation", is a "noisy loop" parodying the works of musician and composer Alan Licht.

== Critical reception ==
Professional ratings
Review scores
Source	Rating
AllMusic	2.5/5 stars
Christgau's Consumer Guide	(neither)
The Encyclopedia of Popular Music	3/5 stars
The Guardian	2/4 stars
NME	5/10
Ox-Fanzine	3/6 stars
Select	1/5 stars
Spin	7/10
Uncut	8/10

Nice Ass received mixed reviews from contemporary music critics. Robert Wilonsky of Dallas Observer called the album a "sloppy pastiche of punk and funk [that] operates on the sort of wit that rhymes 'split ends' with 'Michael Jackson and his little friends.' " Darren Cahr of Punk Planet called the album "fucking hilarious, completely lo-fi, and very much in the Pussy Galore tradition of intentionally bad musicianship put great effect [sic]." See's Steven Sandor likewise compared Free Kitten and Pussy Galore and noted the band's newfound "musical consistency", stating that they were "no longer trying to preach as much as [wanting] to be the punk rock band Sonic Youth refused to be, ever since recording Goo [(1990)]." Sascha Kösch of Spex praised the catchiness of the album's songs and overall "fun" nature, describing them as being "practically more pop than [German DJ] WestBam". Less favorably, Thomas Kerpen of Ox-Fanzine felt that whilst the album was "less boring" than Thurston Moore's debut solo album Psychic Hearts (1995), it was "too demanding in the long run".

Deborah Sprague of Trouser Press felt the addition of Yoshimi and Ibold to Free Kitten's lineup helped Nice Ass stay coherent; she highlighted "What's Fair" and "Revlon Liberation Orchestra" for providing "some worthwhile gray matter calisthenics", but felt it was mostly "steeped in the sort of self-glorifying silliness that killed arena rock the first time around". Caspar Smith of Select said that Free Kitten did not "add up to the sum of its parts" and that its members should have "[stuck] to the day jobs", whilst Tom Ridge of The Wire dismissed them as a "hobby band that should have stayed confined to the garage". Manning of Melody Maker panned the album as an "unfocused, amateurish mess" and criticized its perceived disregard for the legacies of Cafritz and Gordon, whom she derided as "singularly untalented has-beens". Conversely, Dixon of The Boston Phoenix felt Free Kitten managed to "approximate inspired amateurism" and its "potent immediacy" without embodying it; he criticized the lyrics for their references to pop culture but felt they were "pretty easy to ignore [...] in light of the deliriously out-of-whack and gleefully crude surface grain" of Gordon and Cafritz' vocals. In a live review for Melody Maker, Everett True defended Free Kitten against "jobsworthy" music critics and praised Nice Ass as "an unfettered delight" despite being "awkward and frantically noisy". Cafritz and Gordon were insulted by critics who accused Free Kitten of being purposefully incompetent; the latter believed most critics did not understand or felt "threatened" by the band, likening negative responses they received to those Sonic Youth received when the band first toured the United Kingdom. Cafritz was reported to have begun Free Kitten's shows with a rant against Manning and journalist David Stubbs.

Retrospectively, Chris Grimshaw of AllMusic described Nice Ass as a "pop cultural artefact" dated by both its sound and lyrical in-jokes. In Goodbye 20th Century (2008), Sonic Youth biographer David Browne called Nice Ass a "bristling, mocking lot", writing: "as with their first show, Free Kitten wanted to be as abrasive and offending as possible, and mostly succeeded." In 2011, Laia Garcia of Rookie called the album "a perfect record" whose songs she viewed as "strident and fuzzy and deliberately sloppy in a way that is both emblematic of the '90s and a total feminist statement in its 'we don't have to make it pretty for you to listen' sorta way". In a 2015 retrospective on Free Kitten's career, Jezebel's Julianne Escobedo Shepherd praised the album for being "poppier" than Sonic Youth and Bikini Kill whilst comparing it with Salt-N-Pepa's Blacks' Magic (1990) in being "explicitly feminist with a sense of knowing, a sense of irony, but also a sense of letting us in on the joke". In 2021, Kerry Cardoza of Bandcamp Daily listed Nice Ass as one of Kill Rock Stars' eight essential albums, stating that it "does a righteous job of taking Phair's venom [on Exile in Guyville] and running with it". Spin ranked "Revlon Liberation Orchestra" at number nine on its list of the 20 best riot grrrl songs in 2022. April Long of Uncut listed Nice Ass as one of Gordon's five best non-Sonic Youth releases in 2024, calling it a "freewheeling feminist mashup" she felt was "as much fun to listen to as it must have been to make". Also that year, Rob Sheffield of Rolling Stone said the album was "pretty lousy [...], but it sure was fun".

== Track listing ==
All tracks are written by Free Kitten, except where noted.

No.	Title	Writer(s)	Length
1.	"Harvest Spoon"		2:42
2.	"Rock of Ages"	DVF; Free Kitten	1:58
3.	"Proper Band"		1:45
4.	"What's Fair"		2:53
5.	"Kissing Well"		3:22
6.	"Call Back (Episode XXI)"		3:00
7.	"Blindfold Test"		2:29
8.	"Greener Pastures"		2:37
9.	"Revlon Liberation Orchestra"		2:46
10.	"The Boasta"		1:31
11.	"Scratch tha DJ"	TM; Free Kitten	1:59
12.	"Secret Sex Friend"		0:41
13.	"Royal Flush"		3:39
14.	"Feelin"		0:58
15.	"Alan Licked Has Ruined Music for an Entire Generation"		0:07
Total length:			32:38

== Personnel ==
Personnel per liner notes.

- Kim Gordon – vocals, guitar, drums (10)
- Julie Cafritz – vocals, guitar
- Mark Ibold – bass
- Yoshimi P-We – drums, vocals, trumpet, harmonica, guitar (10)
- MD – beats (9)
- Fred – engineering, mixing (1)
- Kenny Liendhart – engineering, mixing (2–15)
