= Glitterbust =

American experimental guitar band

- Years active: 2015–present
- Labels: Burger
- Members: Kim Gordon; Alex Knost

Glitterbust are an American experimental electric guitar duo composed of Kim Gordon and Alex Knost. Their self-titled debut album was released on Burger Records on March 4, 2016. The band named themselves after a song by Royal Trux off of their Twin Infinitives LP.

== Discography ==
- Glitterbust (March 4, 2016).
