= Sentimental Education (Free Kitten album) =

Studio album by Free Kitten
- Released: September 23, 1997
- Recorded: 1997
- Genre: Indie rock, noise rock
- Length: 58:44
- Label: Kill Rock Stars
- Producer: Kim Gordon, Marie Pierre, and Wharton Tiers

Free Kitten chronology
Punks Suing Punks (1996)	Sentimental Education (1997)	Inherit (2008)

Professional ratings
Review scores
Source	Rating
AllMusic	3/5 stars
Christgau's Consumer Guide	(3-star Honorable Mention)
The Guardian	4/5 stars
Pitchfork	8.0/10
The Times	8/10

Sentimental Education is the second studio album by the band Free Kitten, released in 1997 on Kill Rock Stars. The album features a collaboration with DJ Spooky and a cover of Serge Gainsbourg's "Teenie Weenie Boppie". The album is named after the novel by French novelist Gustave Flaubert.

== Track listing ==
1. "Teenie Weenie Boppie" (Serge Gainsbourg) – 3:02
2. "Top 40" – 2:49
3. "Never Gonna Sleep" – 6:17
4. "Strawberry Milk" – 2:33
5. "Played Yrself" – 2:59
6. "DJ Spooky's Spatialized Chinatown Mix" – 6:24
7. "Bouwerie Boy" – 2:18
8. "Records Sleep" – 1:36
9. "Picabo Who?" – 0:35
10. "Sentimental Education" – 12:21
11. "One Forty Five" – 2:19
12. "Eat Cake" – 1:05
13. "GAA" – 6:57
14. "Daddy Long Legs" – 5:38
15. "Noise Doll" – 1:51

== Personnel ==
- Kim Gordon – Vocals, Guitar
- Julie Cafritz – Vocals, Guitar
- Yoshimi P-We – Drums, Vocals, Trumpet
- Mark Ibold – Bass
- DJ Spooky – DJ
