= Coming Apart (album) =

Studio album by Body/Head
- Released: September 10, 2013
- Recorded: December 2012 at Sonelab in Easthampton, Massachusetts
- Genre: Experimental rock, noise rock
- Length: 68:03
- Label: Matador

Body/Head chronology
Body/Head (2013)	Coming Apart (2013)	No Waves (2016)

Coming Apart is the debut studio album by the American alternative rock band Body/Head, a guitar duo composed of Kim Gordon and Bill Nace. It was released on September 10, 2013, on Matador Records. Recorded in Easthampton, Massachusetts in late 2012, Coming Apart features experimental noise rock arrangements alongside largely feminist-themed lyrics. The album features loose re-workings of the traditional folk song "Black Is the Colour (Of My True Love's Hair)", and "Ain't Got No, I Got Life" by Nina Simone.

Upon its release, Coming Apart received favorable reviews from music critics. Gordon's vocals and the album's minimal production were praised by critics, and Nace's guitar techniques and the album's free structure drew comparisons to earlier releases by Sonic Youth—of whom Gordon was a co-founder and a former member. Body/Head embarked on a U.S. tour in support of its release and were due to tour Europe in late 2013.

== Composition ==
Coming Apart features 10 tracks, all of which feature original music composed by Kim Gordon and Bill Nace. Gordon wrote lyrics for seven of the album's songs and Nace contributed lyrics to one song, "Murderess." "Ain't" is based on the 1969 Nina Simone song "Ain't Got No, I Got Life" and feature lyrics written by James Rado and Gerome Ragni performed over Body/Head's own music. The album's penultimate track, "Black", is based on Patty Waters' rendition of the traditional American folk song "Black Is the Colour (Of My True Love's Hair)".

Describing Coming Apart's sound, The New York Times' Ben Ratliff said "the music rests on root chords, drones, feedback and repeated patterns from two guitars." Gordon listed jazz music, and in particular John Coltrane, as influences on the songs' compositions, noting that the opening track "Abstract" includes a similar structure to the music on Coltrane's album Meditations (1965). Ratliff stated that much of Body/Head's music is "directly traceable to early Sonic Youth", of whom Gordon was a co-founder, vocalist, guitarist and bassist. Nace listed Sonic Youth's fourth studio album, Sister (1987), as an influence on his guitar techniques, which have been compared to Japanese noise musician Merzbow. The composition of the album's sound has been described as being "free of verse/chorus structures" and compared to Sonic Youth's earlier releases. After the album was recorded—much of it live, with minimal overdubs and no added percussion—at Sonelab in Easthampton, Massachusetts in December 2012, the album's engineer Justin Pizzoferrato mixed Gordon's guitar to the left channel and Nace's guitar to the right channel of the final stereo mix.

Much of Coming Apart's lyrics were largely improvised. Critics have made connections between the album's lyrical themes on songs such as "Last Mistress" and Gordon's divorce from former bandmate and husband Thurston Moore in late 2011. Gordon "bleeds cathartically all over the record" with her lyrics leaving her "as emotionally naked as she could possibly be." Spin highlighted the feminist themes on Coming Apart, explaining that much of the album "is about women's roles—their duty, their identity. Gordon sings of the murderess, the mistress, the actress, the 'good little housewife' … The songs are threaded with desperation and desire, detailing their service of and proximity to male power—both the possession and loss of it." Gordon's vocals, which drew comparisons to Patti Smith, were produced with considerable amounts of echo and reverb "to use it as another instrument in itself."

== Release ==
Coming Apart was released on September 10, 2013 in the United States and Canada on Matador Records. It was released worldwide on September 16 and made available on CD, double LP and as a digital download. The album's title is a reference to the 1969 film of the same name, directed by Milton Moses Ginsberg. Prior to Coming Apart's official release, the album's fourth track "Actress" was made available for stream.

Body/Head performed a number of shows in the United States in support of Coming Apart's release, including dates in Brooklyn, New York; Los Angeles and San Diego, California; Chicago, Illinois and Detroit, Michigan in September and October 2013. The band is due to commence a three-week European tour, beginning at Amplifest in Porto, Portugal on October 20 and concluding at Cafe Oto in London, United Kingdom on November 10. During Body/Head's original live performances in 2012, the band's "approach was largely instrumental" and featured Gordon and Nace performing alongside slow-motion film projections against a backdrop. The band's 2013 tour featured Gordon's vocals "creeping more into the mix", with material from Coming Apart being performed alongside "lots of built-in improvisational space."

== Reception ==
Professional ratings
Aggregate scores
Source	Rating
Metacritic	75/100
Review scores
Source	Rating
Allmusic	4/5 stars
Consequence of Sound	3.5/5 stars
DIY	8/10
FILTER	74%
Magnet	90/100
NME	7/10
Pitchfork Media	7.7/10
PopMatters	8/10
Rolling Stone	3/5 stars
Spin	8/10

Upon its release, Coming Apart received mainly positive reviews from critics. At Metacritic, which assigns a normalized rating out of 100 to reviews from mainstream critics, the album received an average score of 75, based on 19 reviews, indicating "generally favorable reviews". Allmusic reviewer Heather Phares rated the Coming Apart four out of five stars, praised Kim Gordon's experimental songwriting techniques and vocal abilities, summarizing that "free-flowing, feminine and feminist, these songs comprise some of the most honest music of Gordon's career. On Coming Apart, she comes into herself." Writing for Consequence of Sound, Ryan Bray described the album as "a sparse exercise in cranky tension, one crafted almost strictly out of angry, feedback-laden soundscapes." He rated the album three-and-a-half out of five stars, selecting "Abstract" and "Last Mistress" as its essential songs. In her review for DIY, El Hunt referred to Coming Apart as "experimentalism at its most boundary pushing" and rated it eight out of ten. Reflecting on the album, Hunt noted that "Body/Head strip sound back to sparse skeletal structures, before building it back up into gargantuan, all-enveloping walls of sound" and said "this isn't just 'noise-rock' … Coming Apart is truly nihilistic No-Wave."

FILTER writer Alejandro Rubio described Coming Apart as having an "overall cathartic tone that runs throughout the record", drawing comparisons to "visceral Lead Belly sensibility through an avant-garde John Cage approach and "the dark Eastern dissonance" of Nico's The Marble Index (1969). Magnet rated the album 90 out of 100, summarizing that "vocally, Gordon is reborn, baptized in fire." In NME's seven out of ten review, reviewer Huw Nesbitt noted that Coming Apart did not demonstrate "anything remotely new for [Gordon] as a musician or for drone music as a whole. But it is done with a pleasing malevolence."

Writing for Pitchfork Media, Marc Masters described how "Gordon and Nace burrow deep into their narrow sound, mining it for more variety and emotion than it should rightfully hold. The effect is subtle—at first the music feels aimless … but give Coming Apart a few listens, and distinctive shapes emerge. Eventually, the duo’s dedication to a specific point of view becomes intoxicating." Kevin Korber of PopMatters awarded the album an eight out of ten rating, praising the idea that "for a project born out of improvisation, Coming Apart is a surprisingly cohesive piece. Gordon and Nace's familiarity and experience with this music shine through each song as they hold together the chaos they unleash." Rolling Stone's Joe Gross said that on the album, "Gordon shows off her signature, muscular vocal quaver, amid plenty of thunderous Sonic Youth-style feedback and guitar creep" and described the "twin-guitar jams" as "opaque", rating the album three out of five stars. In Spin's review of Coming Apart, Jessica Hopper rated it eight out of ten and highlighted the album's feminist themes, noting that "Nace fits seamlessly into this feminine cosmos" and summarizing that "at no other time in her career has Gordon been so forceful, so in her own power."

== Track listing ==
All music is composed by Kim Gordon and Bill Nace.

No.	Title	Lyrics	Length
1.	"Abstract"	Gordon	6:07
2.	"Murderess"	Nace	1:06
3.	"Last Mistress"	Gordon	6:39
4.	"Actress"	Gordon	5:01
5.	"Untitled"	Gordon	1:49
6.	"Everything Left"	Gordon	5:37
7.	"Can't Help You"	Gordon	5:11
8.	"Ain't" (based on Nina Simone's "Ain't Got No, I Got Life")	James Rado, Gerome Ragni	6:01
9.	"Black" (based on "Black Is the Colour (Of My True Love's Hair)")	Traditional	13:19
10.	"Frontal"	Gordon	17:13
Total length:			68:03

== Personnel ==
All personnel credits adapted from Coming Apart's liner notes.

Body/Head

- Kim Gordon – vocals, guitar
- Bill Nace – guitar

Technical personnel

- Justin Pizzoferrato – recording, mixing
- John Golden – mastering

Design personnel

- blank blank – artwork, design
- Matt de Jong – design
- Sean Kaufman – design assistant
- Dave Markey – photography
- Vice Cooler – photography
