= Through a Room =

Studio album by Bill Nace
- Released: November 11, 2022
- Genre: Experimental
- Length: 42:00
- Label: Drag City
- Producer: Cooper Crain

Bill Nace chronology
Both (2020)	Through a Room (2022)

Singles from Through a Room
- 1. "Boil First" Released: 8 August 2022

Professional ratings
Aggregate scores
Source	Rating
Metacritic	75/100
Review scores
Source	Rating
Pitchfork	7.6/10

Through a Room is the third studio album by American experimental guitarist Bill Nace. It was released on November 11, 2022, by Drag City.

== Background ==
Through a Room was recorded in Philadelphia in the summer of 2021, with producer and engineer Cooper Crain.

== Singles ==
On August 8, 2022, the first single "Boil First" was released. The official music video for the single, released the same day, was directed by American film director Laurie Collyer.

== Critical reception ==
Through a Room was met with generally favorable reviews from critics. At Metacritic, which assigns a weighted average rating out of 100 to reviews from mainstream publications, this release received an average score of 75, based on 4 reviews.

== Track listing ==
Through a Room track listing
No.	Title	Length
1.	"Intro"	3:46
2.	"Les Echos (Piece for Tuba)"	7:42
3.	"Boil First"	3:05
4.	"E:E"	5:53
5.	"When Orange"	2:00
6.	"Crooked Teeth"	7:06
7.	"The Giant"	2:23
8.	"Ann"	8:03
9.	"Outro"	2:11
