= No Home Record =

Studio album by Kim Gordon
- Released: October 11, 2019
- Studios: Paulie Sphere Studios, Los Angeles, California
- Genres: Industrial; electro-rock; art punk
- Length: 39:20
- Label: Matador
- Producers: Kim Gordon, Justin Raisen, Shawn Everett

Kim Gordon solo chronology
No Home Record (2019)	The Collective (2024)

Singles from No Home Record
- 1. "Murdered Out" Released: September 12, 2016; 2. "Sketch Artist" Released: August 20, 2019; 3. "Air BnB" Released: September 11, 2019; 4. "Hungry Baby" Released: October 7, 2019

No Home Record is the debut solo album by Kim Gordon. The album was produced by Justin Raisen after the two met in an Airbnb, and is named after Chantal Akerman's 2015 documentary No Home Movie. The album has received positive reviews.

== Background ==
No Home Record is Kim Gordon's first solo album in her 38-year music career. According to Gordon, she decided to start working on the album after meeting producer Justin Raisen in an Airbnb rental a few years prior to the album's recording. Raisen asked her to sing on a project that he had been working on, which became the basis for the song "Murdered Out". The two decided to continue working on a solo album. It was released on October 11, 2019.

== Music and production ==
The music from the album has been called a "feast of disorienting beats" by NPR writer Lars Gotrich, and includes instruments such as oboe and guitar. Chantal Akerman's 2015 documentary film called No Home Movie inspired Gordon to name her album the same and give it sense and context.

== Critical reception ==
Professional ratings
Aggregate scores
Source	Rating
AnyDecentMusic?	7.8/10
Metacritic	80/100
Review scores
Source	Rating
AllMusic	4/5 stars
And It Don't Stop	A
Financial Times	4/5 stars
The Guardian	5/5 stars
The Independent	4/5 stars
NME	3/5 stars
Pitchfork	8.4/10
Q	4/5 stars
Rolling Stone	3.5/5 stars
Uncut	8/10

No Home Record was met with generally positive reviews. At Metacritic, which assigns a weighted average rating out of 100 to reviews from professional publications, the album received an average score of 80, based on 26 reviews.

The album received perfect scores from Laura Snapes of The Guardian, who said that it "brilliantly weds noise textures to pop dynamics", and Joe Creely of The Skinny, who called it a "superb genre-spanning solo debut" and "a real joy of an album". Danijela Bočev of The Quietus said "The album dazzles with the thrilling cocktail of styles Gordon's been through, as if changing channels on the coolest radio on earth." Pitchfork's Philip Sherburne called her solo debut "thrilling" and said it was "shot through with the beautiful, unsparing noise that has always defined her art." Reviewing for The Observer, Kitty Empire found it to be "quiet a feat" for Gordon to "connect 70s No Wave with the mischievous end of contemporary digital production" on "punishing, three-dimensional soundscapes" like "AirBnB". In his "Consumer Guide" column, Robert Christgau also highlighted the musical accomplishment of the album and recommended it be heard on quality speakers: "The guitars credited throughout meld with the electronics that dominate in a rough but also eloquently textured construct that complements the fragility and directness of Gordon’s sometimes pained, sometimes whispery vocals."

Some reviewers were more critical. El Hunt of NME called the album "uneasy and scratchy", and a "restless listen". In an otherwise positive review for Rolling Stone, David Browne said that "Gordon's ever elliptical" lyrics lack the candor and personal insight of her 2015 memoir Girl in a Band.

== Track listing ==
All tracks are written by Kim Gordon and Justin Raisen; except where noted.

No Home Record track listing
No.	Title	Writer(s)	Length
1.	"Sketch Artist"		2:51
2.	"Air BnB"		4:10
3.	"Paprika Pony"	Gordon, Raisen, Jeremiah Raisen	4:08
4.	"Murdered Out"		3:34
5.	"Don't Play It"	Gordon, Jake Messina Meginsky	4:47
6.	"Cookie Butter"	Gordon, Shawn Everett	6:26
7.	"Hungry Baby"		3:41
8.	"Earthquake"	Gordon	4:18
9.	"Get Yr Life Back"		5:25
Total length:			39:20

== Personnel ==
- Kim Gordon – vocals, guitar, drum machine; bass on “Hungry Baby"
- Justin Raisen – programming, synthesizer, guitar, bass; organ on "Hungry Baby"

with:

- Anthony Paul Lopez – drums on "Air BnB"
- Jeremiah Raisen – programming, keyboards on "Paprika Pony"
- Stella Mozgawa – drums on "Murdered Out"
- Jake Messina Meginsky – drums, bass, tape loops on "Don't Play It"
- Shawn Everett – drum machine on "Cookie Butter"
- Bosh Bruiser Rothman – drums on "Hungry Baby" and "Earthquake"

Technical

- Anthony Paul Lopez, Jake Messina Meginsky, Justin Raisen, Shawn Everett – engineer
- Mike Zimmerman – art direction
- Josephine Pryde – front cover photography

== Charts ==
Chart performance for No Home Record
Chart (2019)	Peak position
Belgian Albums (Ultratop Flanders)	40
Belgian Albums (Ultratop Wallonia)	116
French Albums (SNEP)	175
Portuguese Albums (AFP)	24
Scottish Albums (Official Charts)	29
UK Albums (Official Charts)	79
US Top Album Sales (Billboard)	74
US Independent Albums (Billboard)	21
