= Body/Head =

American experimental duo

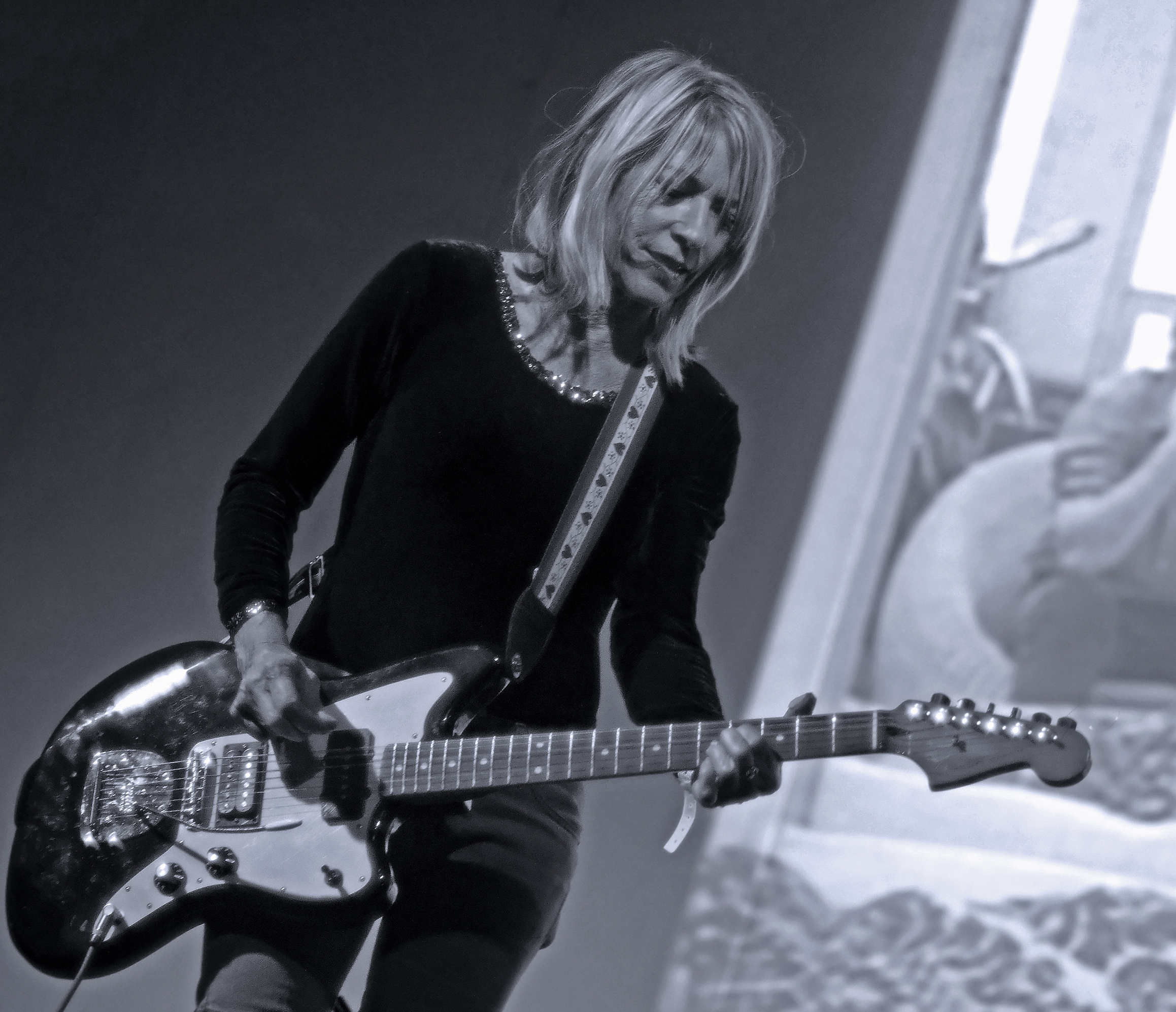
- Body/Head, Kim Gordon, Supersonic festival 2012

Background information
- Origin: Northampton, Massachusetts, United States
- Genres: Alternative rock; experimental rock; noise rock
- Years active: 2012–present
- Labels: Matador
- Members: Kim Gordon; Bill Nace
- Website: bodyheadmusic.com

Body/Head are an American experimental electric guitar duo composed of Kim Gordon and Bill Nace.

== History ==
Kim Gordon and Bill Nace began working together in 2011 in Northampton, Massachusetts. Body/Head took its name from a book about the films of Catherine Breillat. Their debut studio album, Coming Apart, was released on Matador Records on September 10, 2013.

The duo released a collaborative live album with Gate, Glare Luring Yo (2012), through Feeding Tube Records.

Body/Head then released a live album, No Waves (2016), through Matador Records.

Body/Head's second studio album, The Switch (2018), was released through Matador Records.

The duo also released a collaborative studio album with Aaron Dilloway, Body/Dilloway/Head (2021), through Three Lobed Recordings.

== Discography ==
=== Studio albums ===
- Coming Apart (Matador, September 10, 2013)
- The Switch (Matador, July 13, 2018)
- Body/Dilloway/Head (with Aaron Dilloway, as Body/Dilloway/Head; Three Lobed Recordings, 2021)

=== Live albums ===
- Glare Luring Yo (with Gate, as Body/Gate/Head; Feeding Tube Records, 2012)
- No Waves (Matador, November 11, 2016)

=== EPs ===
- Body/Head (Open Mouth, January 8, 2013)
- The Show Is Over (Matador, November 4, 2014)
