= Unboxed (Free Kitten album) =

Compilation album by Free Kitten
- Released: 1994
- Recorded: 1992, 1993
- Genre: Indie rock
- Length: 40:04
- Label: Wiiija
- Producer: Jim Waters, Don Fleming, and Wharton Tiers

Free Kitten chronology
Call Now (1992)	Unboxed (1994)	Nice Ass (1995)

Unboxed is a compilation album of early singles and the EP Call Now by the band Free Kitten, released in 1994.

== Track listing ==
1. "Skinny Butt"
2. "Platinumb"
3. "Smack"
4. "Falling Backward"
5. "Oneness"
6. "Dick"
7. "Yoshimi vs. Mascis"
8. "Oh Bondage Up Yours!" (Poly Styrene)
9. "1,2,3"
10. "Party with Me Punker" (Mike Watt)
11. "John Stark's Blues"
12. "Guilty Pleasures"
13. "Sex Boy" (Darby Crash)
14. "Cleopatra"
15. "Loose Lips"
16. "Oh Baby"

== Personnel ==
- Kim Gordon - Vocals, Guitar
- Julie Cafritz - Vocals, Guitar
- Yoshimi P-We - Drums, Trumpet
- Mark Ibold - Bass
- Wharton Tiers - Drums on "Loose Lips"
