= Inherit (album) =

Studio album by Free Kitten
- Released: May 20, 2008
- Recorded: Bisquiteen, Amherst, MA, Summer 2007; Addition recording, Bank Row Recording
- Genre: Indie rock
- Length: 49:25
- Label: Ecstatic Peace!
- Producers: Free Kitten, Justin Pizzoferrato

Free Kitten chronology
Sentimental Education (1997)	Inherit (2008)

Professional ratings
Review scores
Source	Rating
The A.V. Club	B− link
Allmusic	link
Aversion	link
Crawdaddy!	favorable link
Pitchfork Media	5.7/10 link
PopMatters	6/10 link
The Skinny	link
Tiny Mix Tapes	link

Inherit is the third studio album by the American band Free Kitten, released on May 20, 2008. It was their first album in over ten years, the last being 1997's Sentimental Education. Dinosaur Jr.'s J Mascis appears on two songs on this album, "Surf's Up", and "Bananas".

== Track listing ==
1. "Erected Girl" – 6:45
2. "Surf's Up" – 3:39
3. "Seasick" – 3:24
4. "Free Kitten on the Mountain" – 7:51
5. "Roughshod" – 1:28
6. "Help Me" – 1:45
7. "The Poet" – 3:41
8. "Billboard" – 2:37
9. "Bananas" – 2:49
10. "Monster Eye" – 11:32
11. "Sway" – 3:51

== Personnel ==
- Free Kitten
  - Kim Gordon – vocals, guitar
  - Julie Cafritz – vocals, guitar
  - Yoshimi P-We – drums, guitar on "Sway"
- J Mascis – additional guitar on "Surf's Up", drums on "Bananas"
- Justin Pizzoferrato – producer, mixer, recorder
- John Golden – mastering at Golden Mastering
