= The Collective (Kim Gordon album) =

Studio album by Kim Gordon
- Released: March 8, 2024
- Genre: Hip-hop; trap; noise; dub; industrial
- Length: 40:34
- Label: Matador
- Producer: Justin Raisen; Sadpony

Kim Gordon solo chronology
No Home Record (2019)	The Collective (2024)	Play Me (2026)

Singles from The Collective
- 1. "Bye Bye" Released: January 16, 2024

The Collective is the second solo studio album by the American musician Kim Gordon, released on March 8, 2024, by Matador Records. It received acclaim from critics. It also received two nominations at the 67th Annual Grammy Awards: Best Alternative Music Album and Best Alternative Music Performance (for "Bye Bye").

== Background and recording ==
The album was inspired in part by Jennifer Egan's 2022 novel The Candy House. Producer Justin Raisen sent Gordon several instrumental tracks, over which Gordon sang vocals and added distortion effects. Gordon also said that she wanted the album to be "more beat-oriented" than her last album, 2019's No Home Record.

== Critical reception ==
Professional ratings
Aggregate scores
Source	Rating
AnyDecentMusic?	7.8/10
Metacritic	84/100
Review scores
Source	Rating
AllMusic	4/5 stars
DIY	4/5 stars
Exclaim!	8/10
The Line of Best Fit	8/10
Mojo	4/5 stars
NME	4/5 stars
Pitchfork	8.5/10
Record Collector	4/5 stars
The Skinny	4/5 stars
Uncut	8/10

The Collective received a score of 84 out of 100 on review aggregator Metacritic based on 18 critics' reviews, indicating "universal acclaim". The Wire felt that "hard edged synths and massive, crunchy beats lend righteous swagger to Gordon's bleary guitar squalls and jetlagged sprechstimme", while Mojo opined that "'The Candy House''s garbled distress flare or the My Bloody Neubauten of 'I Don't Miss My Mind' confirm she is still picking up signals nobody else can". Uncut stated that "there's little identifiable guitar until track five, by which time anxiety and menace have taken hold thanks to the lumbering mien of 'Bye Bye' and 'I'm a Man''s monstrous grind. 'Shelf Warmer' lets in some air but it too is fabulously foul". Record Collector's Jeremy Allen wrote that on The Collective, "the needle flickers high into the red with layer upon layer of digital distortion and some of the filthiest beats known to man".

Stereogum named it album of the week, with the website's Chris DeVille writing that the album's "glory" is "the Sonic Youth co-founder's ability to comfortably step into that kind of decayed SoundCloud rap environment while also infusing it with the experimental rock swagger that has been her own signature for over four decades. The screeching, booming, slow-crawling production feels alien to Gordon's catalog, but she makes it entirely her own". Jack Faulds of The Skinny observed that the album "leans further into the heavy dub and trap stylings introduced on 2019's No Home Record" and "manages to hit that sweet spot, creating an album that is adventurous, charmingly deadpan and visceral at every turn".

Reviewing the album for Pitchfork, Shaad D'Souza described it as "a maelstrom of mundane thoughts and funny asides and flashes of pure rage whipped into a heavy, unnerving fog. It sounds how TikTok brain feels". Charlotte Marston of DIY found it to be "a more cut-and-paste type affair" with "Kim continuing to funnel uncomfortable truths through skulking trip-hop sounds and dank industrial rhythms". The Line of Best Fit's Callum Foulds stated that "There is no one out there doing it like Kim Gordon, and her return to music with The Collective proves that she is still the coolest person in music".

Oliver Crook of Exclaim! wrote that The Collective "isn't easy to listen to. Its jarring, angular beats—courtesy of producer Justin Raisen—are challenging, the chugging electronics, freewheeling guitar and snarled spoken word at odds with melody". NME's Jordan Bassett opined that Gordon "balances her less than commercial sensibilities with crunchily on-trend production and relatable lyrics about rotten capitalism and fragile masculinity". Kory Grow of Rolling Stone called it Gordon's "own unique spin on noisy hip-hop", also stating that "the songs come off as avant-garde, trap, old-school hip-hop, noisy, or musique concrète depending on where you drop the needle".

=== Year-end lists ===
Select year-end rankings for The Collective
Publication/critic	Accolade	Rank	Ref.
BBC Radio 6 Music	26 Albums of the Year 2024	-	
Bleep	Top 10 Albums of 2024	6	
Exclaim!	50 Best Albums of 2024	35	
MOJO	The Best Albums Of 2024	10	
Rough Trade UK	Albums of the Year 2024	37	
Uncut	80 Best Albums of 2024	30	

== Track listing ==
All lyrics are written by Kim Gordon; all music is composed by Gordon and Justin Raisen, with additional composers noted.

The Collective track listing
No.	Title	Music	Length
1.	"Bye Bye"	Jeremiah Raisen	4:14
2.	"The Candy House"		2:21
3.	"I Don't Miss My Mind"		3:25
4.	"I'm a Man"	Anthony Paul Lopez	4:31
5.	"Trophies"	Lopez	2:36
6.	"It's Dark Inside"	Lopez	3:35
7.	"Psychedelic Orgasm"	Lopez	3:40
8.	"Tree House"		4:06
9.	"Shelf Warmer"		4:11
10.	"The Believers"	Je. Raisen; Lopez	4:55
11.	"Dream Dollar"	Joe Kennedy	3:00
Total length:			40:34

Deluxe edition bonus tracks
No.	Title	Length
12.	"Bangin' on the Freeway"	3:35
13.	"ECRP"	3:56
Total length:		48:05

== Personnel ==
- Kim Gordon – vocals, guitars
- Justin Raisen – production, mixing, engineering, programming, instrumentation
- Anthony Paul Lopez – mixing, engineering (all tracks); programming (tracks 4–9), instrumentation (5–7)
- Mike Bozzi – mastering
- Brad Lauchert – engineering
- Ainjel Emme – programming (1, 3, 10)
- Sadpony – production, programming (1, 10); instrumentation (10)
- Sarah Register – instrumentation (8, 9)
- Joe Kennedy – programming, instrumentation (11)

== Charts ==
Chart performance for The Collective
Chart (2024–2025)	Peak position
Australian Vinyl Albums (ARIA)	15
Belgian Albums (Ultratop Flanders)	55
Croatian International Albums (HDU)	4
Portuguese Albums (AFP)	46
Scottish Albums (OCC)	12
Swiss Albums (Schweizer Hitparade)	52
UK Album Downloads (OCC)	11
UK Independent Albums (OCC)	6
US Top Album Sales (Billboard)	40
