= Play Me (Kim Gordon album) =

Studio album by Kim Gordon
- Released: March 13, 2026
- Genres: Trap; industrial; trip hop
- Length: 29:55
- Label: Matador
- Producer: Justin Raisen

Kim Gordon chronology
The Collective (2024)	Play Me (2026)

Singles from Play Me
- 1. "Not Today" Released: January 14, 2026; 2. "Dirty Tech" Released: February 11, 2026; 3. "Play Me" Released: March 10, 2026

Play Me (stylized in all caps) is the third solo studio album by the American musician Kim Gordon, released on March 13, 2026, via Matador Records. Like her previous album The Collective (2024), it was produced by Justin Raisen.

== Background and recording ==
Play Me is Gordon's third album in collaboration with producer Justin Raisen. It was recorded in Raisen's home studio.

== Composition ==
Musically, Play Me is an album that relies primarily on Gordon's trap vocals, Raisen's industrial textures, and trip hop beats. Lyrically, Gordon focuses on aspects of modern life, such as U.S. politics and the rise of AI.

On "Busy Bee", Dave Grohl makes an appearance, playing drums on top of sped-up dialogue between Gordon and Free Kitten bandmate Julia Cafritz. The dialogue was taken from an episode of MTV Beach House that the pair guest-hosted in the 1990s.

== Promotion and singles ==
On June 13, 2025, Gordon released "ByeBye25!", a reworking of the single "Bye Bye" from her 2024 album The Collective, with updated lyrics based on words flagged by the second Trump administration. It was accompanied with a black-and-white music video showing Gordon walking through a construction site. Proceeds from the single and associated T-shirt went to Noise for Now, a non-profit organization based on reproductive rights. Although it appears as a track on Play Me, it had been released as a standalone single.

Play Me was announced on January 14, 2026, with its release date, track listing, label, and official lead single "Not Today". Kate and Laura Mulleavy, known as the founders of Rodarte, directed the music video in which Gordon stars in a custom tulle dress that the Mulleavys designed for her. The track features Gordon singing, something she had not done in years on her records. On February 11, Gordon released the second single "Dirty Tech", a trap song with lyrics inspired by the rise of AI. Moni Haworth directed its music video, starring Gordon in an abandoned office space. Then on March 10, the title track was released with a music video directed by Barnaby Clay, and Gordon announced dates for an upcoming tour in North America and Europe spanning April to July 2026.

On June 17, 2026, in the midst of her summer U.S. tour, Gordon appeared on The Tonight Show Starring Jimmy Fallon and played the title track. Being a former resident of New York City, she wore a jersey of New York Knicks player Jalen Brunson, the new NBA MVP whose team had recently won their first championship in five decades. The appearance alluded to a 1994 performance on the Late Show with David Letterman, where, while performing "Bull in the Heather" with Sonic Youth, wore a jersey of Knicks player John Starks.

== Critical reception ==
Professional ratings
Aggregate scores
Source	Rating
AnyDecentMusic?	7.5/10
Metacritic	80/100
Review scores
Source	Rating
Clash	8/10
Classic Rock	8/10
DIY	4/5 stars
Exclaim!	8/10
Hot Press	5/10
The Line of Best Fit	7/10
Paste	A−
Pitchfork	7.0/10
The Skinny	4/5 stars
Uncut	9/10

According to the review aggregator Metacritic, Play Me received "generally favorable reviews" based on a weighted average score of 80 out of 100 from twenty-two critic scores. The review aggregator AnyDecentMusic? gave the album a weighted average score of 7.5 out of 10 from twenty-four critic scores.

Victoria Segal of Mojo magazine gave Play Me four stars out of five and said Gordon "still sound[s] like an artist whose nerve endings are uninsulated, whose desire to create remains explosive". In another four-star review for the NME, Andrew Trendell described the record as "a left turn" in relation to her previous solo records, adding it "has no place being this jarring yet pleasurable from any 'rock' artist, let alone at 72". In Classic Rock magazine, Emma Johnston said that the album's "unpredictability" and "sense of anxiety" was "entirely fitting with the era we're in", and in Beats Per Minute, John Amen gave the album an 83% and opined that in a time of "chaos and unpredictability", Gordon chose to "embrace it ... [with] unflagging allure". Paste's Grant Sharples lauded Gordon's ability to use humor to both critique and mock the people in power, delivered in such a way that "never comes across as Resistance-core pedantry".

Writing for The Line of Best Fit, Devin Birse thought the album was "at its most interesting" when it was not as easily categorized into a specific genre, highlighting "Not Today" in particular. In a four-star review, JR Moores of Record Collector compared Gordon's observational lyricism to the late Mark E. Smith and described her approach as having "a first-draft feel" that succeeds in allowing room for interpretation. Joe Muggs of The Arts Desk similarly commented that its songs felt like "first drafts or even an improv session", but they gave Play Me two stars out of five, saying it "[felt] like an unfinished experiment". Muggs also said that while Gordon leans further into elements that made The Collective a good record, they criticized her vocal performance as "trapped between deadpan and declamatory".

== Track listing ==
All lyrics are written by Kim Gordon; all music is composed by Gordon and Justin Raisen, with additional composers noted below.

Play Me track listing
No.	Title	Music	Length
1.	"Play Me"		2:28
2.	"Girl with a Look"		2:33
3.	"No Hands"		2:00
4.	"Black Out"		1:38
5.	"Dirty Tech"	Jeremiah Raisen	2:20
6.	"Not Today"		3:35
7.	"Busy Bee"	Dave Grohl	3:01
8.	"Square Jaw"		2:19
9.	"Subcon"		2:55
10.	"Post Empire"		2:26
11.	"Nail Biter"	Anthony Paul Lopez	2:13
12.	"ByeBye25!"	Je. Raisen	2:27
Total length:			29:55

== Personnel ==
Credits are adapted from the vinyl liner notes, except where noted.

=== Musicians ===
- Kim Gordon – vocals (all tracks), guitar (2–8, 10–12), noise (3), harmonies (5), dialogue from MTV Beach House (7)
- Justin Raisen – Akai MPC sampler (except 6), bass guitar (1, 2, 6, 7), drum programming (1, 3–5, 7–10, 12), synthesizer (2, 6, 7, 9, 10, 12), drums (2, 6), drum box, rhythm guitar (2), Roland 808 (3, 4, 8, 10), Roland 909 (3), Bass Station synthesizer (5), guitar (6, 7, 12), background vocals (6, 9), drum machine (6), bass synthesizer, foley (9), sub bass (10), fuzzbox (11), Nord (12)
- Ainjel Emme – background vocals (2)
- Sadpony (Note: Sadpony is an alias of Jeremiah Raisen.) – drum programming (5, 12), DX7 synthesizer (5)
- Julia Cafritz – dialogue from MTV Beach House (7)
- Dave Grohl – drums (7)
- Anthony Paul Lopez – drum programming, foley, Roland 808, synthesizer (11)

=== Technical and design ===
- Justin Raisen – production, mixing (all tracks)
- Sadpony – production (5, 12)
- Anthony Paul Lopez – production (11), mixing (all tracks)
- Brad Lauchert – engineering (all tracks)
- Mike Bozzi – mastering at Bernie Grundman Mastering (all tracks)
- Coco Gordon Moore – body painting
- Brian Roettinger – art direction, typography
- Annabel Mehran – photography

== Charts ==
=== Weekly charts ===
Weekly chart performance
Chart (2026)	Peak position
Belgian Albums (Ultratop Flanders)	15
Belgian Albums (Ultratop Wallonia)	38
Croatian International Albums (HDU)	6
Dutch Vinyl Albums (Dutch Charts)	33
French Albums (SNEP)	186
Japanese Rock Albums (Oricon)	16
Japanese Western Albums (Oricon)	19
Scottish Albums (OCC)	11
Swiss Albums (Schweizer Hitparade)	71
UK Albums Sales (OCC)	12
UK Independent Albums (OCC)	7
US Top Album Sales (Billboard)	42

=== Monthly charts ===
Monthly chart performance
Chart (2026)	Position
Croatian International Vinyl Albums (HDU)	7
