= Girl in a Band =

2015 autobiography by Kim Gordon

Girl in a Band: A Memoir
- Author: Kim Gordon
- Language: English
- Genre: Autobiography
- Publisher: Dey Street Books
- Publication date: February 24, 2015
- Publication place: United States
- Pages: 288

Girl in a Band: A Memoir is a 2015 autobiography written by former Sonic Youth bass guitarist, vocalist and songwriter Kim Gordon.

== Publication ==
The 288-page memoir was published on February 24, 2015, by Dey Street Books, an imprint of HarperCollins. The title draws on lyrics from the song "Sacred Trickster" on Sonic Youth's last album, The Eternal (2009): "What's it like to be a girl in a band?/ I don't quite understand." The lyric also appears in a piece in Gordon's 2013 art show—a survey of her work since 1980—at New York's White Columns gallery.

== Content ==
Girl in a Band describes Gordon's life from her childhood—first in Rochester, New York, then Los Angeles—through the founding and trajectory of Sonic Youth, her marriage of nearly three decades to bandmate Thurston Moore, and the ultimate dissolution of both their marriage and the band.

== Reception ==
The memoir received strongly favorable reviews. In The New York Times, Questlove praised the book's "careful introspection, detail and real feeling," noting that even when the many celebrities in Gordon's life appear in the narrative, "it never feels forced or showy. She's clear on how the people around served her as artistic inspirations, sparking her ideas and giving her the confidence to express herself." In NME, Leonie Cooper noted, "Gossip about the breakdown of both her marriage and Sonic Youth will draw many to Gordon's book. But she overrides it wonderfully, handling both with resigned simplicity and finding catharsis through the art she cherishes and a performance with an all-female line-up at Nirvana's 2014 induction into the Rock and Roll Hall of Fame. So much more than a rock biog, Girl in a Band is a unique record of the past 50 years of alternative culture."

The Guardian's positive review of the book concluded that "this memoir is a kind of setting ablaze of a life's work that for Gordon is now inextricable from heartbreak", but observed that, in Gordon's treatment of the breakdown of her marriage, "What could simply be described as a story of two people who fell in love and then fell out of love with all of the usual emotional squalor is... depicted in terms of the midlife crisis, a narrative frame that reads as unnecessarily punitive to all concerned."
