= Free Kitten =

American alternative rock band

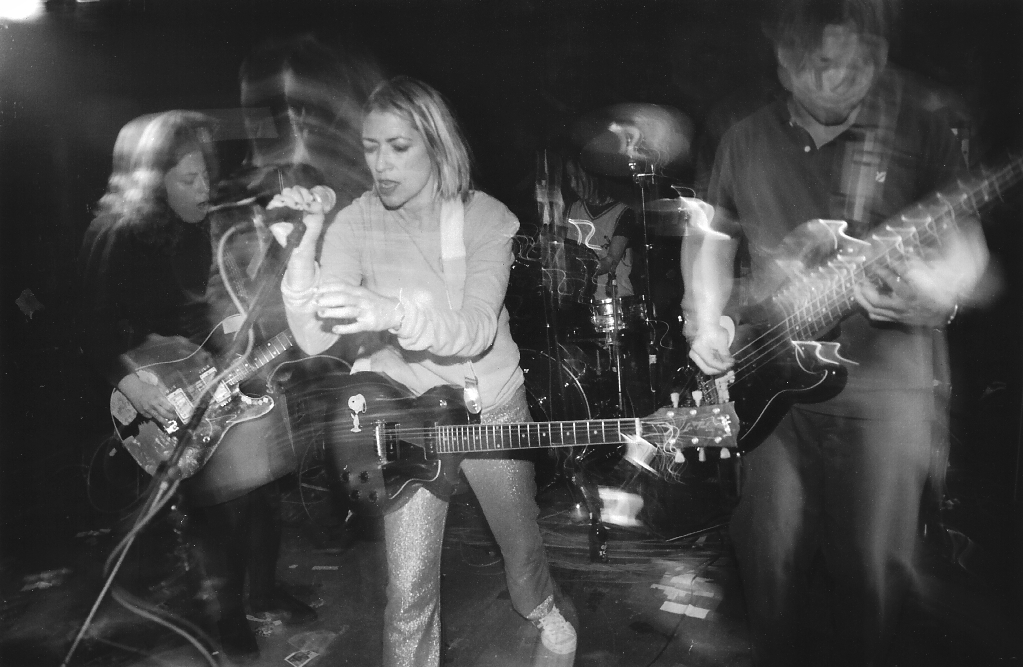
- Free Kitten (1993)

Background information
- Also known as: Kitten
- Origin: New York City, U.S.
- Genres: Alternative rock, indie rock
- Years active: 1992–1997, 2007–present
- Labels: Wiiija, Kill Rock Stars, Ecstatic Peace!
- Members: Kim Gordon; Julie Cafritz; Yoshimi P-We
- Past members: DJ Spooky; Mark Ibold

Free Kitten is an American alternative rock band formed by Sonic Youth's Kim Gordon and Pussy Galore's Julia Cafritz. Originally performing as Kitten, they changed their name after receiving threats of legal action by a heavy metal singer performing under the same name. Boredoms member Yoshimi P-We took up drums, and Pavement's Mark Ibold joined later on as bassist. They have released a handful of albums and singles, mainly on label Kill Rock Stars, including a remix 12-inch featuring DJ Spooky. They toured on 1993's Lollapalooza. A studio album, 2008's Inherit, on Thurston Moore's Ecstatic Peace! label, is the group's most recently available.

== Discography ==
=== Studio albums ===
Title	Release date	Label
Nice Ass	1995	Kill Rock Stars
Sentimental Education	1997	Kill Rock Stars
Inherit	2008	Ecstatic Peace!

=== Compilation albums ===
Title	Release date	Label
Unboxed	1994	Wiiija

=== EPs ===
Title	Release date	Label
Straight Up (as Kitten)	1992	Pearl Necklace
Call Now	1992	Ecstatic Peace!
Punks Suing Punks	1996	Kill Rock Stars

=== Singles ===
Year	Title	Label
1992	"Yoshimi Vs. Mascis" split	Time Bomb
1993	"Oh Bondage Up Yours!"	Sympathy for the Record Industry
1993	"Lick!"	In The Red
1993	"Special Groupie"	SOS
1994	"Sex Boy"	Radiation
1994	"Harvest Spoon"	Wiiija
1997	"Chinatown Express"	Kill Rock Stars
2008	"Seasick"	Ecstatic Peace!
