= The Book of Law (album) =

Studio album by Lawrence Rothman
- Released: October 13, 2017
- Length: 47:21
- Label: Downtown/Interscope
- Producer: Justin Raisen

Lawrence Rothman chronology
The Book of Law (2017)	I Know I've Been Wrong, But Can We Talk (2018)

Professional ratings
Aggregate scores
Source	Rating
Metacritic	72/100
Review scores
Source	Rating
AllMusic	3/5 stars

The Book of Law is the debut studio album by American singer-songwriter Lawrence Rothman. It was released on October 13, 2017 through Downtown Records.

The album was produced by Rothman and Justin Raisen, and features contributions from Angel Olsen, Kim Gordon, Marissa Nadler, Charli XCX, Kristin Kontrol, and Duff McKagan, among others.

== Track listing ==
No.	Title	Length
1.	"Descend"	2:28
2.	"Wolves Still Cry"	4:18
3.	"Shout"	3:50
4.	"Stand By"	3:24
5.	"Jordan"	4:54
6.	"Geek"	5:11
7.	"Your Kiss Tastes Like Dope"	3:44
8.	"Ascend"	3:44
9.	"Die Daily"	5:33
10.	"Walking My Tears Across Manhattan"	3:51
11.	"California Paranoia"	3:45
12.	"Ain’t Afraid of Dying"	2:39
