= Violet Grohl =

American musician (born 2006)

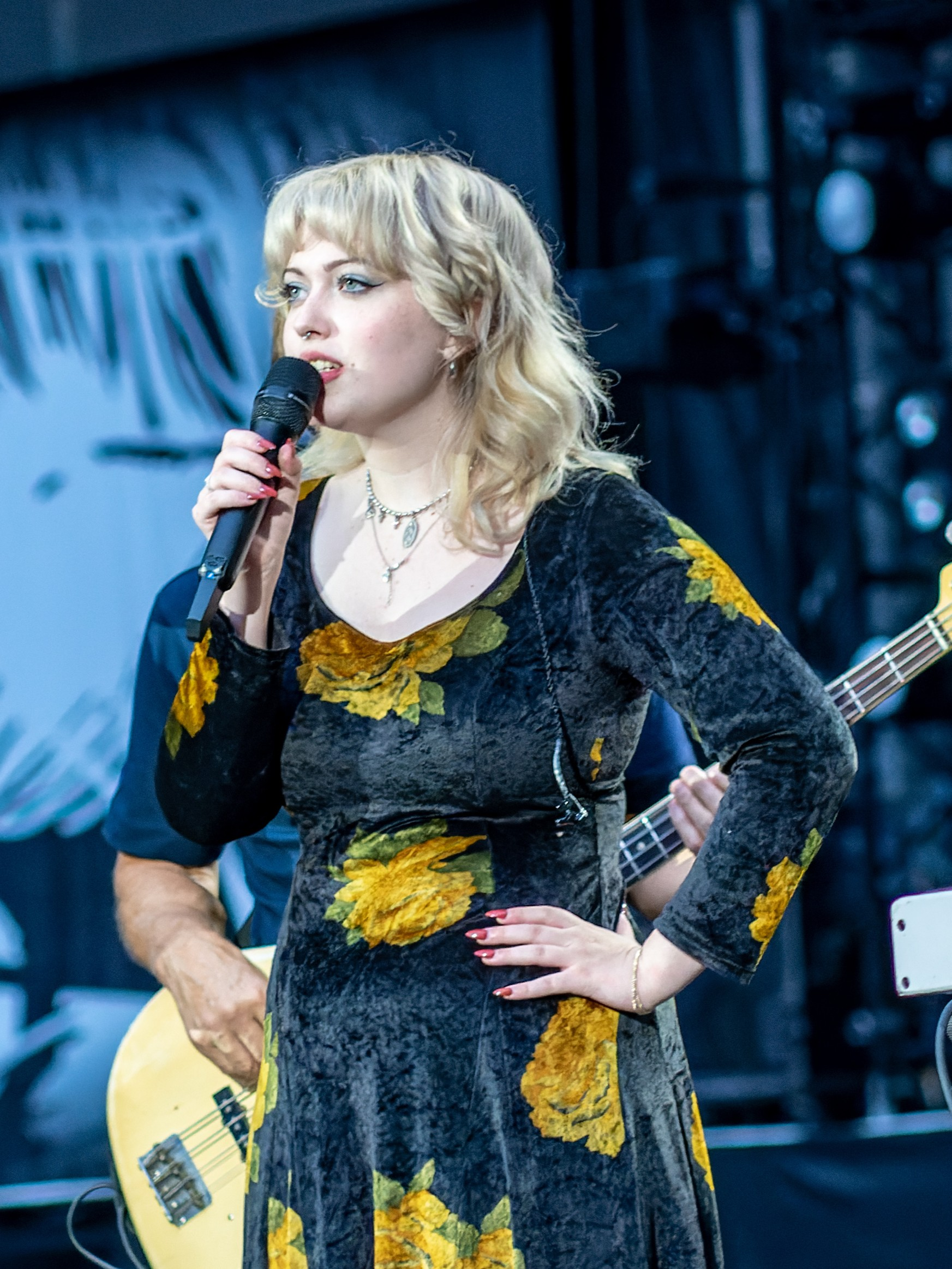
- Grohl in 2022
- Born: April 15, 2006 (age 20); Los Angeles, California, U.S.
- Occupations: Singer; songwriter
- Years active: 2018–present
- Father: Dave Grohl
- Musical career
- Genres: Alternative; grunge; indie rock
- Instruments: Vocals; guitar
- Labels: Auroura; Republic

Violet Maye Grohl (born April 15, 2006) is an American singer and songwriter. She is the eldest daughter of Foo Fighters frontman and former Nirvana drummer Dave Grohl. Her debut album, Be Sweet to Me, was released through Auroura and Republic Records on May 29, 2026.

== Early life ==
Violet Grohl was born in Los Angeles, California, on April 15, 2006, to Foo Fighters frontman and former Nirvana drummer Dave Grohl and director Jordyn Blum. She spent her childhood in Los Angeles, alongside younger sisters Harper and Ophelia. Grohl had a musical education, becoming proficient in musical production software Pro Tools at 14 years old. In 2024, she gained a half-sister when her father had an extramarital affair.

== Career ==
Grohl's first professional appearance as a musician occurred in 2018 when she was 12 years old. At a benefit concert held at the Fox Oakland Theatre to support the UCSF Benioff Children's Hospital, she and her father performed a rendition of Adele's "When We Were Young". Discussing the performance, NME noted, "Grohl prove[d] that she's very much on the way to becoming a star in her own right, showing off some seriously impressive pipes."

At a 2020 charity event supporting The Art of Elysium, Grohl performed Nirvana's song "Heart-Shaped Box" alongside the remaining members of the band, Dave Grohl, bassist Krist Novoselic, and touring guitarist Pat Smear, at the Hollywood Palladium. She also performed vocals in sets with Beck and St. Vincent.

In 2021, Grohl and her father released a cover of X's "Nausea". Later in the year, she was featured on her father's 2021 project The Hanukkah Sessions, where she covered Amy Winehouse's "Take the Box". She also contributed backing vocals to Foo Fighters's single "Making a Fire".

In 2022, Grohl participated in tribute shows to late Foo Fighters drummer and close friend of her family's, Taylor Hawkins, that took place in Wembley, England and Inglewood, California. She opened the concert in Inglewood singing a cover of "Hallelujah". At Wembley she sang Jeff Buckley's "Last Goodbye" and "Grace", as well as the Zutons's "Valerie".

In 2023, Grohl was featured on the Foo Fighters's single "Show Me How", harmonizing with her father, and appeared alongside the band at the 2023 Glastonbury Festival, where the band performed under the pseudonym the ChurnUps.

On January 30, 2025, the surviving members of Nirvana (Dave Grohl, Novoselic and Smear) reunited for the first time in five years to perform a surprise four song set at the Fire Aid benefit concert in Los Angeles. Violet Grohl joined the band on lead vocals for the final song, "All Apologies".

On March 11, 2026, Grohl announced her debut studio album Be Sweet to Me, which was released on May 29. Grohl also released the single "595" from the album, which was selected as Hype-Index's "Hottest Record".

== Influences ==
During her childhood, Grohl was influenced by the 1990s grunge wave that her parents had a role in. Grohl used the Breeders album Last Splash (1993) as a reference point when working on her debut album Be Sweet to Me with producer Justin Raisen. Grohl has cited PJ Harvey as a musical influence, particularly her performance on the Pyramid Stage at Glastonbury 2024.

== Discography ==
=== Studio albums ===
Title	Album details	Peak chart positions							
Title	Album details	US Sales	AUS	BEL (FL)	BEL (WA)	FRA Phys.	FRA Rock	SCO	UK Sales
Be Sweet to Me	Released: May 29, 2026; Label: Auroura, Republic; Format: CD, LP, digital download	37	90	39	137	82	19	18	16

=== Singles ===
List of singles, with selected chart positions, showing year released and album name
Song	Year	Peak chart positions				Album
Song	Year	US AAA	US Alt.	CAN Alt.	UK Sales	Album
"Thum"	2025	38	31	7	—	Be Sweet to Me
"Applefish"	2025	—	—	—	—	Be Sweet to Me
"What’s Heaven Without You"	2026	—	—	—	78	Non-album single
"595"	2026	—	—	—	—	Be Sweet to Me
"Cool Buzz"	2026	—	—	—	—	Be Sweet to Me
"Bug In the Cake"	2026	—	25	24	—	Be Sweet to Me
"—" denotes a recording that did not chart or was not released in that territory.

Other appearances and releases

- "Making a Fire" (2020)
- "Nausea" (2021)
- "Take the Box" (2021)
- "At Seventeen" (2022)
- "Show Me How" (2023)
- "Metal Birds" (2026)
