= The Switch (Body/Head album) =

Studio album by Body/Head
- Released: July 13, 2018
- Length: 38:44
- Label: Matador

Body/Head chronology
No Waves (2016)	The Switch (2018)

Singles from The Switch
- 1. "You Don't Need" Released: June 5, 2018

Professional ratings
Aggregate scores
Source	Rating
Metacritic	75/100
Review scores
Source	Rating
AllMusic	4/5 stars
Consequence of Sound	B+
Exclaim!	8/10
Flood Magazine	6/10
The Guardian	3/5 stars
PopMatters	7/10

The Switch is the second studio album by the American experimental rock duo Body/Head. It was released on July 13, 2018, under Matador Records.

== Critical reception ==
The Switch was met with "generally favorable" reviews from critics. At Metacritic, which assigns a weighted average rating out of 100 to reviews from mainstream publications, this release received an average score of 75, based on 17 reviews. Aggregator Album of the Year gave the release a 71 out of 100 based on a critical consensus of 17 reviews.

=== Accolades ===
Publication	Accolade	Rank	Ref.
The Wire	Top 50 Albums of 2018	9	

== Track listing ==
No.	Title	Length
1.	"Last Time"	7:53
2.	"You Don't Need"	5:26
3.	"In the Dark Room"	4:38
4.	"Change My Brain"	10:41
5.	"Reverse Hard"	10:06
