= Kim Gordon =

American musician and artist (born 1953)

- Gordon in 2026
- Born: Kimberly Althea Gordon; April 28, 1953 (age 73); Rochester, New York, U.S.
- Education: Santa Monica College; Otis College of Art and Design (BFA)
- Occupations: Singer; musician; songwriter
- Years active: 1981–present
- Spouse: Thurston Moore (m. 1984; div. 2013)
- Children: 1
- Musical career
- Genres: Alternative rock; experimental rock; punk rock
- Instruments: Vocals; guitar; bass
- Years active: 1981–present
- Labels: SST; Geffen; Matador
- Member of: Free Kitten; Body/Head; Glitterbust
- Formerly of: Sonic Youth
- Website: kimaltheagordon.com

Kim Althea Gordon (born April 28, 1953) is an American musician, singer and songwriter most notable as the bassist, guitarist, and vocalist of alternative rock band Sonic Youth. Born in Rochester, New York, she was raised in Los Angeles, where her father was a professor at the University of California, Los Angeles. After graduating from Los Angeles's Otis College of Art and Design, she moved to New York City to begin an art career. There, she formed Sonic Youth with Thurston Moore in 1981. She and Moore married in 1984, and the band released a total of six albums on independent labels before the end of the 1980s. It then released nine studio albums on the label DGC Records, beginning with Goo in 1990. Gordon was also a founding member of the musical project Free Kitten, which she formed with Julia Cafritz in 1993.

Sonic Youth released its 15th and final studio album, The Eternal (2009), on Matador Records before disbanding in 2011 after Gordon and Moore separated. After the dissolution of Sonic Youth and her divorce from Moore, Gordon formed the experimental duo Body/Head with Bill Nace, which released its debut album, Coming Apart, in 2013. She subsequently formed Glitterbust with Alex Knost, releasing a self-titled debut album in 2016. Body/Head released its second studio album, The Switch, in 2018. Gordon released her first solo album, No Home Record, in 2019. Her sophomore solo effort, The Collective, followed in 2024. Released to widespread critical acclaim, it has earned Gordon her first two Grammy nominations.

In addition to her work as a musician, Gordon has had ventures in record producing, fashion, and acting, and has worked consistently as a visual artist throughout her musical career. She debuted as a producer on Hole's debut album Pretty on the Inside (1991), and founded the Los Angeles–based clothing line X-Girl in 1993. Beginning in the mid-2000s, Gordon began acting, making minor appearances in such films as Last Days (2005) and I'm Not There (2007) and guest-starring on several television series. In 2015, she published a memoir, Girl in a Band, by HarperCollins imprint Dey Street Books.

== Life and career ==
=== 1953–1978: Early life ===
Kim Althea Gordon was born April 28, 1953, in Rochester, New York, the second child of Althea (d. 2002) and Calvin Wayne Gordon (1915–1998). At the time of her birth, Gordon's father, a native of Kansas, was a professor in the sociology department at the University of Rochester. Her mother, a descendant of American pioneers of the West Coast, learned to sew during her upbringing in the Great Depression, and worked as a seamstress throughout Gordon's childhood. She was described by Gordon as "reserved and usually anxious" and "an unfulfilled artist." Gordon had one older brother, Keller (1949–2023), whom she described as "brilliant, manipulative, sadistic, arrogant, almost unbearably articulate," and "the person who more than anyone else in the world shaped who I was, and who I turned out to be."

At the age of five, Gordon and her family relocated to Los Angeles, California, when her father was offered a professorship in the sociology department at the University of California, Los Angeles (UCLA), where he later became the Dean of Faculty. As a child, Gordon attended University Elementary School, a progressive elementary school affiliated with UCLA, which she described as "learn[ing] by doing. So we were always making African spears and going down to the river and making mud huts, or skinning a cowhide and drying it and throwing it off the cliff at Dana Point." In her memoir, Gordon recounts spending summers with her family in Klamath, California, near the Oregon border. The family also lived in British Hong Kong for one year during her childhood.

Gordon attended University High School in Los Angeles, and dated classmate Danny Elfman while a student there. After graduating high school, she attended Santa Monica College for two years before transferring to York University in Toronto, Ontario, Canada. Gordon soon grew homesick and chose to drop out of York at the end of the school year and return to Los Angeles. "I was less and less happy as the bleak Toronto winter moved in," she recalled. "Without the benefit of California sunshine, my hair grew darker and darker, and I had no idea how to dress for the cold." She decided to enroll at the Otis College of Art and Design, which she said "changed my life." Gordon lived in Culver City and Venice, Los Angeles, and worked at an Indian restaurant to pay her tuition. She also briefly worked for art dealer Larry Gagosian as a side-job. She graduated with a Bachelor of Fine Arts degree in 1977.

While she was a student at Otis, Gordon's older brother Keller suffered a psychotic episode on the day of his graduation from the University of California, Berkeley, where he had earned a master's degree in classics. He was subsequently diagnosed with paranoid schizophrenia, and for a time lived in halfway houses before becoming a ward of the state of California. The song "Schizophrenia," which appeared on Sonic Youth's fourth studio album, Sister (1987), was partly inspired by her brother.

=== 1979–1994: Sonic Youth and X-Girl ===
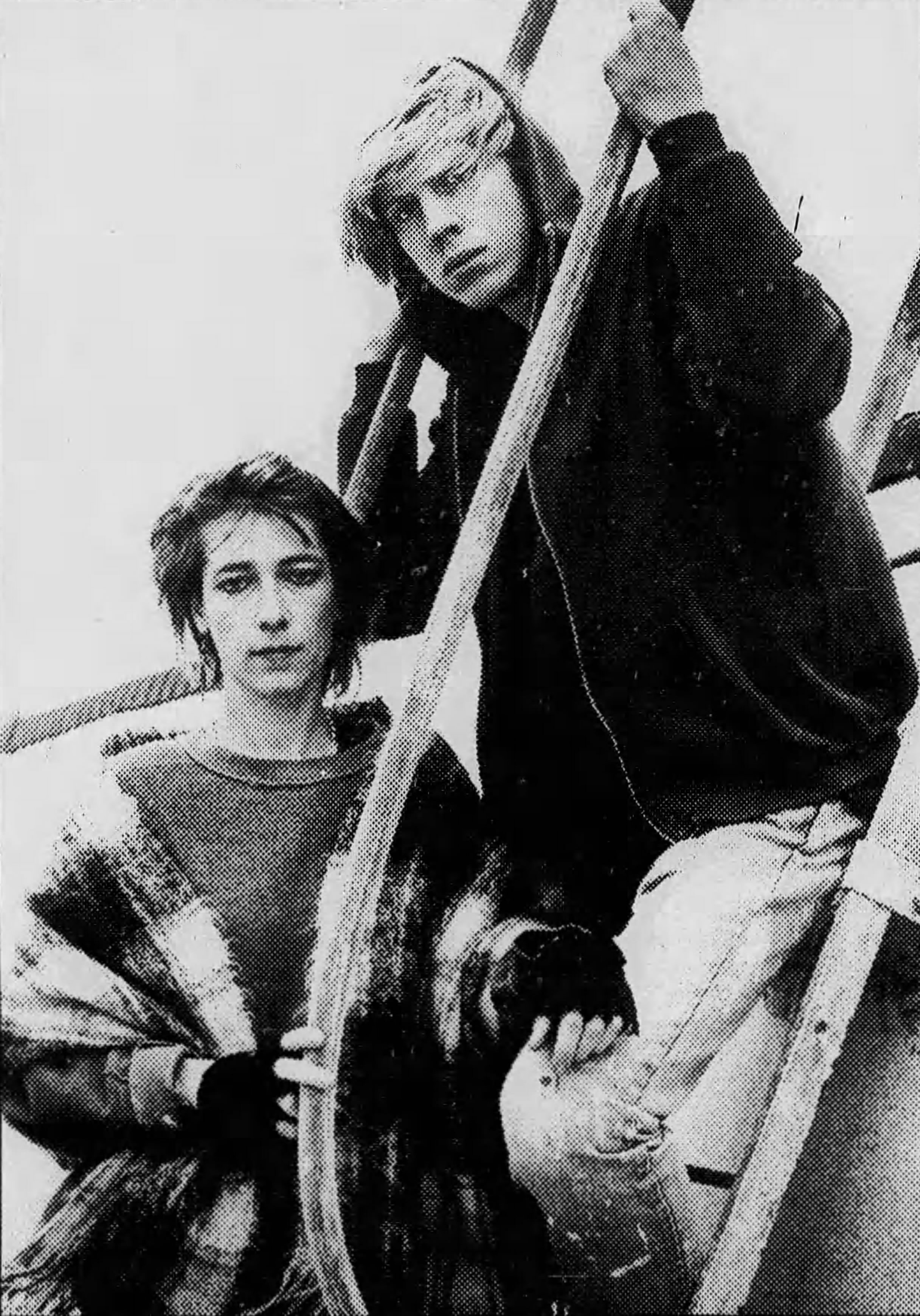
Gordon with Thurston Moore in 1985

After graduating from the Otis Art Institute, Gordon moved to New York City in 1980, hoping to pursue a career in art. There, she took art-related jobs to earn an income, such as working as a writer for Artforum, and launched a "D.I.Y. project called Design Office, doing low-fi artistic interventions" in friends' apartments. In 1981, she curated an exhibition at White Columns Gallery that involved contributions from Mike Kelley and Tony Oursler, among others. Around 1981, Gordon became interested in "no-wave" bands, recalling: "When I came to New York, I'd go and see bands downtown playing no-wave music. It was expressionistic and it was also nihilistic. Punk rock was tongue-in-cheek, saying, 'Yeah, we're destroying rock.' No-wave music is more like, 'NO, we're really destroying rock.' It was very dissonant. I just felt like, Wow, this is really free. I could do that."

In 1981, Gordon joined the short-lived band CKM, with Christine Hahn and Stanton Miranda, and met her future Sonic Youth bandmates Lee Ranaldo and Thurston Moore through Miranda. At the time, Gordon, then 27 years old, had never played an instrument. Gordon began dating Moore and, together with Ranaldo, the couple then formed Sonic Youth in 1981. The band released their first unnamed EP (considered by the band to be their first album) in 1982 and their first two albums, Confusion is Sex (1983) and Bad Moon Rising (1985) on Neutral and Homestead Records, respectively, before signing with SST to release EVOL (1986) and Sister (1987). Gordon and Moore married in 1984, three years after beginning Sonic Youth. In October 1988, the band released Daydream Nation through Enigma Records.

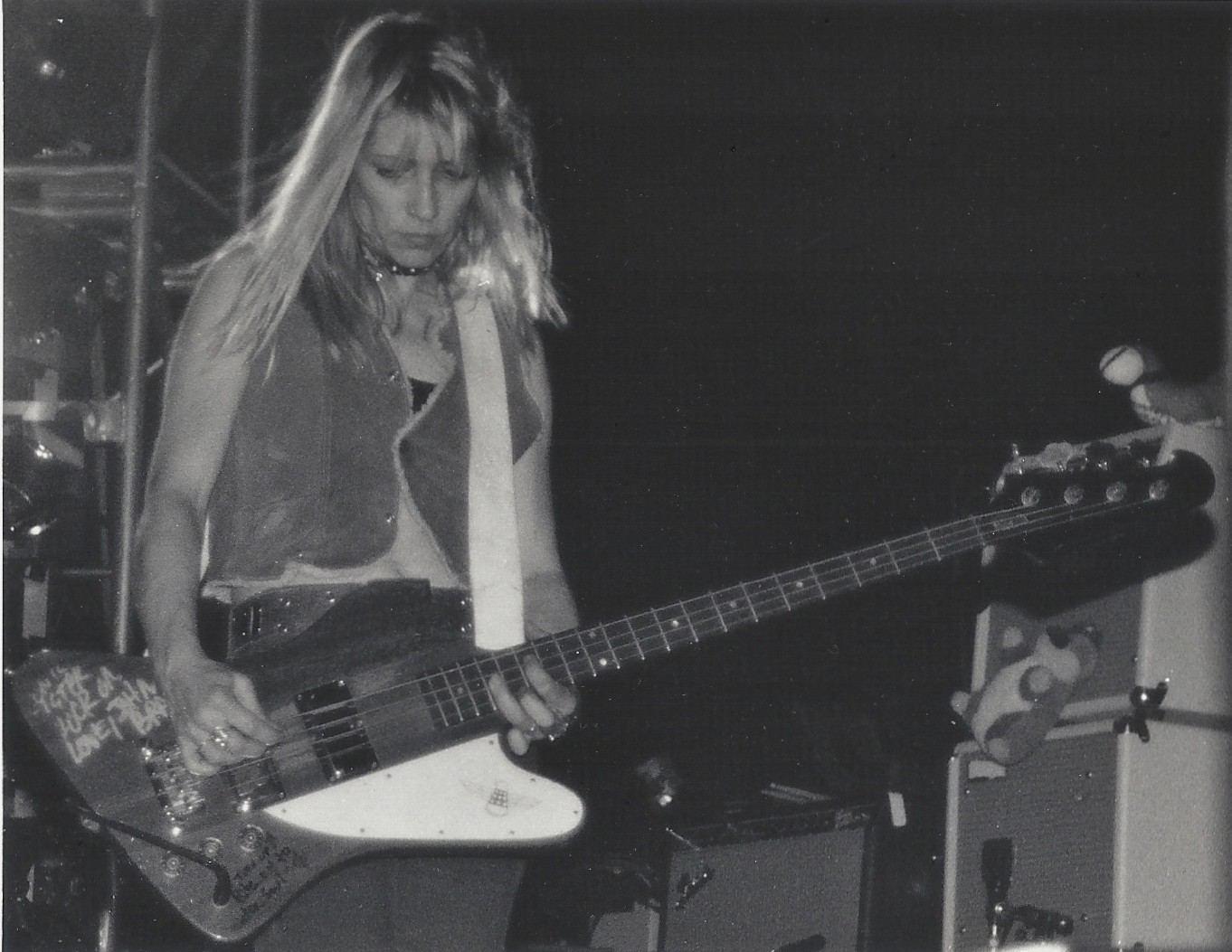
Gordon performing with Sonic Youth in Leeds, 1992

In 1989, Sonic Youth signed onto DGC Records, a subsidiary of Geffen, and released Goo (1990), which became the group's first commercial hit. Also in 1989, Gordon, Sadie May, and Lydia Lunch formed Harry Crews, and released the album Naked in Garden Hills. To promote Goo, Gordon toured with Sonic Youth extensively between 1990 and 1991, and a documentary titled 1991: The Year Punk Broke documented the band's tour with Nirvana, Babes in Toyland, Dinosaur Jr., Gumball and Mudhoney. In early 1991, Courtney Love, who had been influenced by Sonic Youth and the no-wave scene, sent Gordon a letter asking her to produce her band Hole's debut record, Pretty on the Inside. Gordon, along with assistance from Don Fleming, produced the album in March 1991, which received critical acclaim and later achieved cult status. Gordon commented on the recording sessions that Love "was either charming and nice or screaming at her band" but that she was "a really good singer and entertainer and front person." In 1992, Gordon released a single, "Electric Pen," with Mirror/Dash, a short-lived project she formed with Moore.

Beginning in 1993, Gordon co-owned, with Daisy von Furth, a women's streetwear clothing company in Los Angeles, called X-Girl. The company was a spin-off of X-Large, a men's streetwear company co-founded by Michael Diamond of the Beastie Boys. The first X-Girl store was opened in Los Angeles in 1994. Actress Chloë Sevigny served as a model for several pieces in the clothing line. Also in 1993, Gordon formed the musical project Free Kitten with Julia Cafritz. On July 1, 1994, Gordon gave birth to her only child, daughter Coco Hayley Moore, with Thurston Moore.

=== 1995–2008: Music, art, and acting ===
Free Kitten released their debut studio album, Nice Ass, in 1995, followed by Sentimental Education (1997), both on the independent label Kill Rock Stars. In 1993, Gordon co-directed The Breeders' "Cannonball" music video with Spike Jonze, and was also involved in an exhibition entitled Baby Generation at Parco gallery in Tokyo. Gordon's exhibition Kim's Bedroom was shown at MU in the Netherlands, and included drawing and paintings alongside live music and special guests.

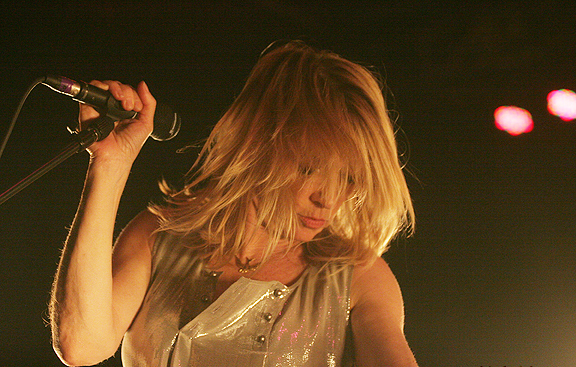
Gordon performing with Sonic Youth in Seattle, 2009

As a part of Sonic Youth, Gordon released several albums in the mid–late 1990s, including Experimental Jet Set, Trash and No Star (1994), Washing Machine (1995), and A Thousand Leaves (1998), all on DGC Records. They subsequently released NYC Ghosts & Flowers in 2000, and Murray Street in 2002. In 1999, after selling her share of X-Girl, Gordon relocated with Moore from New York City to Northampton, Massachusetts, to raise their daughter. Around 2002, Gordon became involved with The Supreme Indifference, a musical collaboration that involved Gordon, Jim O'Rourke and Alan Licht. The band appeared on the 2002 compilation Fields and Streams, though their contribution was deemed "annoying" and the project "self-indulgent" by critic Adrian Begrand of PopMatters.

In 2003, Gordon was featured in the Gothenburg Biennale and exhibited Club In The Shadow, an installation art collaboration with artist Jutta Koether, at Kenny Schachter's Contemporary Gallery in New York City. In 2005, she submitted another collaboration with Koether for the Her Noise exhibition in London, United Kingdom, entitled "Reverse Karaoke." In the same year, an artist's book Kim Gordon Chronicles Vol. 1 was published and featured photos of Gordon throughout her life. The following year, Kim Gordon Chronicles Vol. 2 was released and featured her drawings, collages, and paintings.

Beginning in 2005, Gordon began appearing in minor or supporting parts in films, first as a record executive in Gus Van Sant's Last Days. She then had a small role portraying a textile exporter in the 2007 French thriller film Boarding Gate, and in Todd Haynes's I'm Not There (2007), inspired by the life of Bob Dylan. The same year, she played a street troubadour in the season six finale of the television series Gilmore Girls, along with husband Moore and their daughter Coco, performing the song "What a Waste" from the album Rather Ripped.

In September 2008, Gordon launched a limited-edition fashion line called Mirror/Dash (also the name of a musical side project that was created with Moore), inspired by Françoise Hardy and based on the idea that "there's a need for clothes for cool moms."

=== 2009–2011: Dissolution of Sonic Youth; personal struggles ===
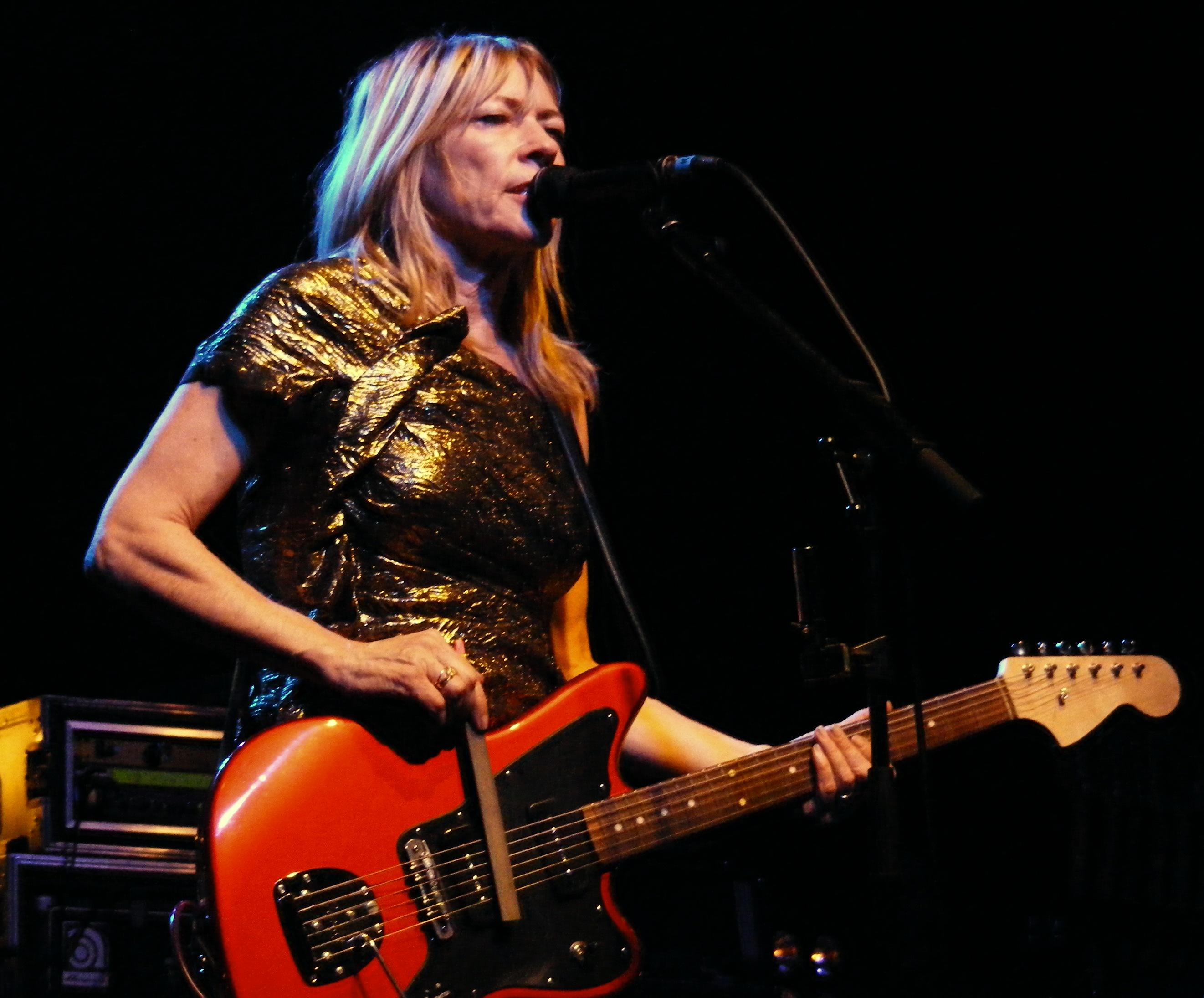
Gordon performing in 2010 with Sonic Youth

Sonic Youth released their final studio album, The Eternal, in 2009. Rolling Stone journalist Will Hermes wrote of the album: "It's amusing to think that the fiercely freaky Sonic Youth were a major-label act for nearly 20 years. The Eternal marks their literal return to indie rock – and that's no big whoop, since they've always done pretty much what they want anyway. The irony is that The Eternal might be their most concise record ever. It's also a rock & roll ass-kicker." The same year, Gordon, along with the rest of Sonic Youth, made an appearance in the television series Gossip Girl and performed an acoustic version of the song "Starpower".

In 2011, Gordon and Moore separated after 27 years of marriage. The next month, bandmate Ranaldo said Sonic Youth had disbanded, after having been together 30 years. (Note: Sonic Youth was founded by Gordon and Moore in 1981, and the group formally disbanded in 2011.) After their divorce was finalized in April 2013, Gordon revealed that she had confronted Moore about a text message from another woman which was then followed by counseling sessions, and the separation occurred because Moore continued his extra-marital relationship. Gordon said her ex-husband was "like a lost soul."

She also said she had been diagnosed with DCIS breast cancer during her divorce, which was successfully treated with surgery.

=== Since 2012: Body/Head and other projects ===
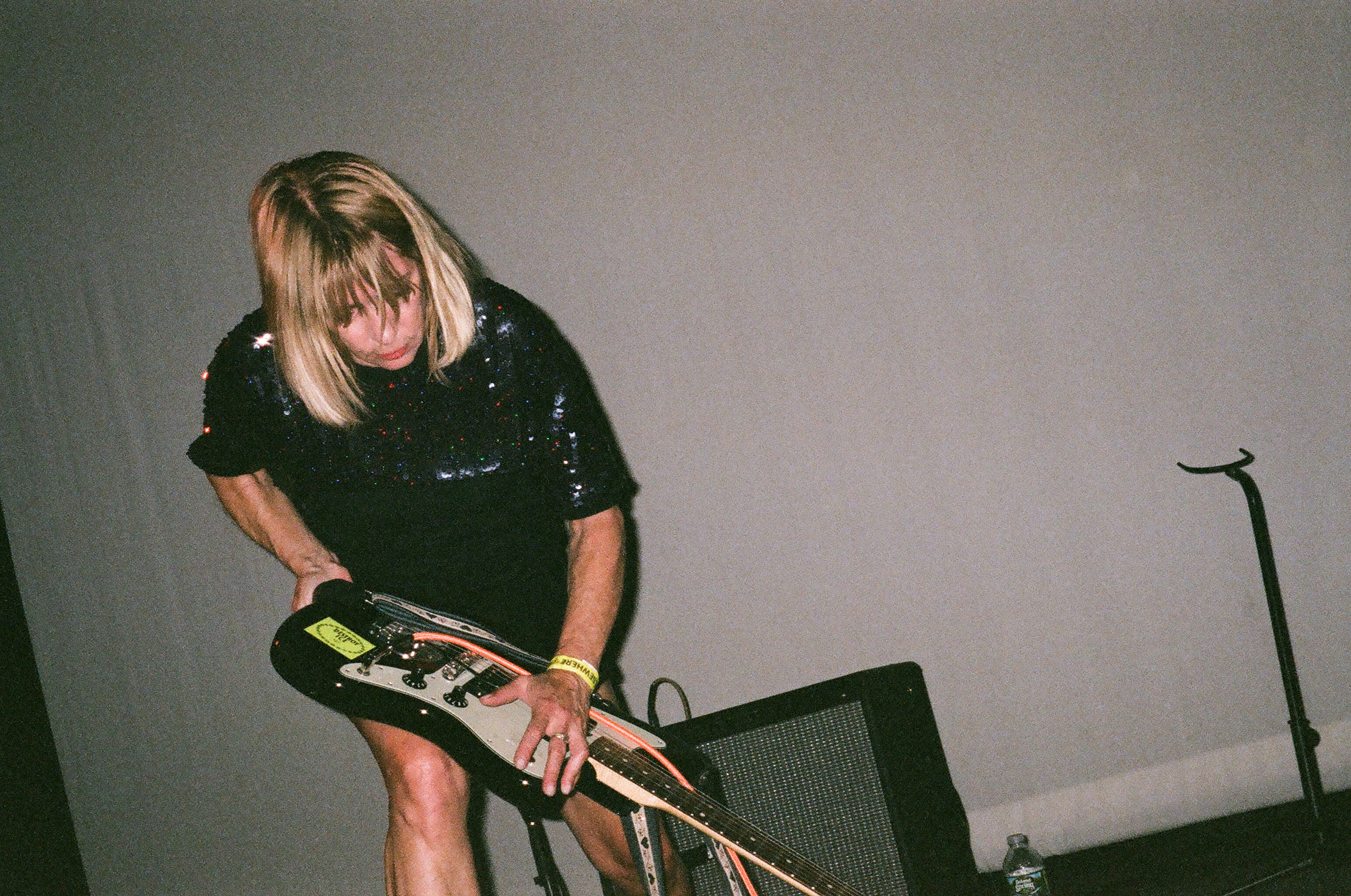
Gordon performing with Body/Head, 2018

Following the announcement of Sonic Youth's hiatus, Gordon commenced touring with Ikue Mori, Tokyo-born drummer of late-1970s band DNA—Gordon had performed with Mori previously at events such as the NoFunFest in 2004. The duo completed a European tour in mid-2012 and Gordon explained during a corresponding interview: "You sorta want to get lost and you hope that the audience gets lost with you ... You can feel if they're listening, you can feel if there's some connection." Together with Bill Nace, Gordon and Mori were selected for the June 2013 All Tomorrow's Parties event that was curated by the band Deerhunter. Around 2012, Gordon formed a noise guitar project with Nace, entitled Body/Head, and a single called "The Eyes, The Mouth" was released in 2012 on Belgian label Ultra Eczema. The band's debut album Coming Apart was released on September 10, 2013, on the Matador Records label and the band completed a U.S. tour during the fall of 2013.

I almost feel like I'm making up for lost time. I feel like I owe it to myself. Because my whole life I wanted to be a visual artist. I really got sidetracked into music.

— Gordon on her artistic aspirations being precluded by her career as a musician, 2018

Gordon also immersed herself in producing art, having felt that music had "sidetracked" her career as a visual artist. She held several art exhibitions in 2013, including "The Show Is Over," at Gagosian Gallery in London, and the survey "Design Office with Kim Gordon–Since 1980," at White Columns, New York, the latter a revival of a project she had begun in 1980. In 2014, she presented newly created Wreath Paintings throughout Rudolf Schindler's iconic Fitzpatrick-Leland House under the byname of Design Office. In January 2014, she appeared in the season three premiere of the series Girls as Mindy, a recovering drug addict in a rehab support group. She then appeared as herself in a March 2014 episode of Portlandia.

Gordon published a memoir, Girl in a Band, on February 24, 2015, by HarperCollins imprint Dey Street Books. The memoir explores her childhood, life in art and Sonic Youth, and marriage to and divorce from Thurston Moore. Its title, Girl in a Band, stems from a lyric in "Sacred Trickster" from Sonic Youth's final album, The Eternal (2009). The lyric goes, "What's it like to be a girl in a band?/ I don't quite understand." The same year, Gordon appeared in The Nightmare (2015), a German horror film in which she portrayed a schoolteacher, which was released at the Locarno International Film Festival. She also contributed to its soundtrack. In November that year, Gordon relocated from the Massachusetts home she had shared with Moore and their daughter to her hometown of Los Angeles, purchasing a home in the Franklin Hills neighborhood.

Also in 2015, Gordon formed the experimental musical group Glitterbust with guitarist Alex Knost, releasing a self-titled debut album in March 2016. Gordon then appeared in Tony Oursler's film Imponderable, which screened at the Museum of Modern Art in June 2016. On September 12, 2016, Gordon released her first solo single, "Murdered Out", followed on August 20, 2019, by a second solo single, "Sketch Artist". A third track, "Air BnB", was released on September 11. All tracks appear on her first solo record on Matador Records, No Home Record, which was released on October 13, 2019.

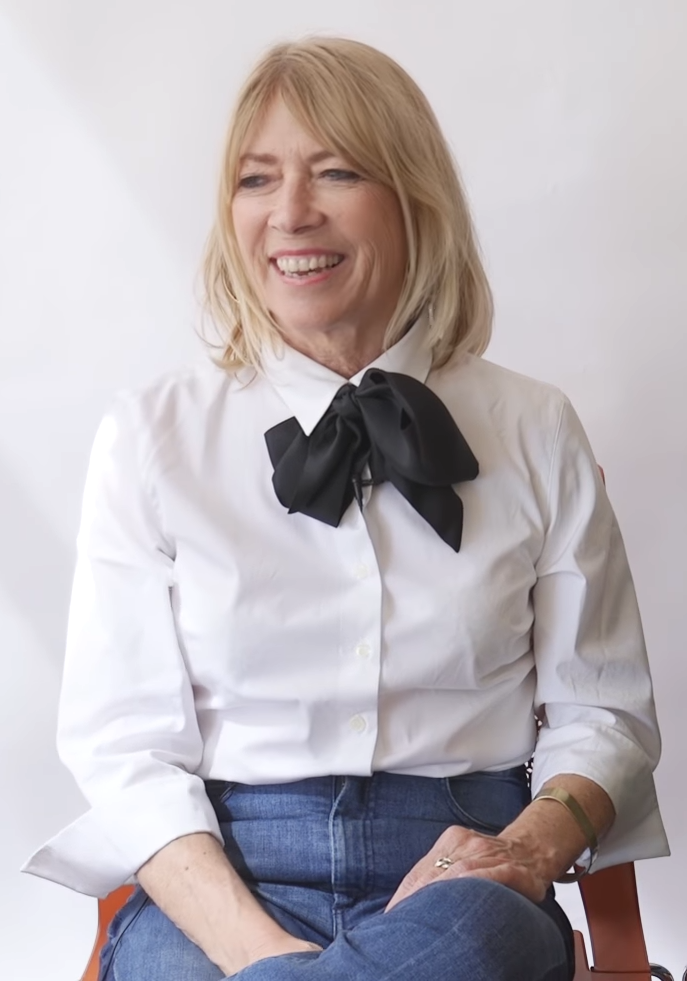
Gordon in 2018

In 2017, Gordon had a small role on the HBO series Animals, followed by a supporting role in Gus Van Sant's comedy-drama film Don't Worry, He Won't Get Far on Foot. Her album No Home Record was rated number 8 of Paste Magazine's "20 Best Punk Albums of 2019".

Kim Gordon: Lo-Fi Glamour, Gordon's first North American museum solo-exhibition, opened at The Andy Warhol Museum in 2019. The exhibition features a commissioned score for Andy Warhol’s 1963–64 silent film Kiss in conversation with text paintings, figure drawings and erotic sculpture.

In 2020, Rolling Stone ranked Gordon the 39th greatest bassist of all time.

In December 2021, Gordon recorded a 7" single on Sub Pop Records with J Mascis titled "Abstract Blues" backed with "Slow Boy".

"Bye Bye" was released as a single in January 2024. The track is from Gordon's album The Collective, which was released in March 2024. The song is accompanied by an official video starring her daughter Coco Gordon Moore. In June 2025, Gordon released a remix to "Bye Bye" featuring lyrics critical of the Trump administration.

== Artistry ==
Gordon possesses a contralto vocal range. A 2016 review from Pitchfork noted her voice as "one of the great instruments in post-punk history, though she doesn't always get credit for the variety of her technique." Despite her prolific career in music, Gordon told journalist Evan Smith in a 2015 interview that she never considered herself a musician, explaining that she had been "drawn into the world" of the music scenes happening in the 1980s, and that she "felt like an outsider" once part of it. Gordon's instrumental work as a guitarist has been described as "free-form" and experimental.

== Influences ==
Several female musicians influenced Gordon. She stated in 2015:

Initially, I was really inspired by The Slits and The Raincoats, and Siouxsie Sioux, Patti Smith. Then, there was The Runaways, Janis Joplin, Tina Turner – who is the ultimate performer – and Billie Holiday.

== Public image ==
Gordon is a popular culture icon, epitomizing an "ineffable, magnetic coolness" and "a certain brand of aloof, downtown cool." Some journalists have noted her as a public figure who has "never given much away" about herself. Adam Horovitz of the Beastie Boys commented on Gordon's persona, stating: "Wherever Kim ends up, she is the coolest person in the room. But I know her, and I know she'd rather be at home grilling hot dogs."

Gordon has also been cited as "a modest polymath" given her varied career pursuits in art, music, fashion, and acting. While observations were made by the media of Gordon being "dauntingly impressive and self-assured" during her tenure with Sonic Youth, she commented in a retrospective interview that she was "pretty insecure about my image and where I fitted in." Describing her image, she said: "I knew I couldn't achieve some kind of cool, stylised image, that just wasn't me... It was a reaction to corporate style. So it was kind of just being yourself, you know walking on stage wearing a t-shirt."

Upon the release of her 2015 memoir, Gordon received some criticism for comments made about other musicians, among them Lana Del Rey: "Naturally, [she]'s just a persona. If she really truly believes it's beautiful when young musicians go out on a hot flame of drugs and depression, why doesn't she just off herself?" Gordon also reflected on working with Courtney Love in 1991, writing: "No one ever questions the disorder behind her tarantula LA glamour – sociopathy, narcissism – because it's good rock and roll, good entertainment! I have a low tolerance for manipulative, egomaniacal behavior, and usually have to remind myself that the person might be mentally ill." Gordon clarified her comments on Del Rey in a subsequent interview, stating: "Initially it was about just seeing something in the paper... something about how rock stars should just like kill themselves with drugs, and Frances Bean [Cobain] had really reacted to that and I felt really actually weirdly protective of Frances. So I was basically just trying to point out that it was a persona and I just offhandedly said what I said... I guess I could have articulated the whole thing a lot better."

== Honors and awards ==
On May 21, 2015, Gordon was honored at The Kitchen's Spring Gala.

On May 5, 2018, she received an Honorary Doctorate from the Emily Carr University of Art and Design.

Gordon received two nominations at the 67th Annual GRAMMY Awards, her album The Collective was nominated for Best Alternative Music Album and her song "BYE BYE" was nominated for Best Alternative Music Performance.

== Legacy ==
Gordon and her contributions in Sonic Youth are considered by critics and music scholars to have been key influences in the development of grunge music and riot grrrl, both musical movements which began in the early 1990s. Among those who have cited her as an influence are filmmaker Sofia Coppola, musician Kathleen Hanna, and Irish singer Róisín Murphy. Hanna explained in 2013:

She was a forerunner, musically. Just knowing a woman was in a band trading lead vocals, playing bass, and being a visual artist at the same time made me feel less alone. As a radical feminist singer, I wasn't particularly well liked. I was in a punk underground scene dominated by hardcore dudes who yelled mean shit at me every night, and journalists routinely called my voice shrill, unlistenable. Kim made me feel accepted in a way I hadn't before. Fucking Kim Gordon thought I was on the right track, haters be damned. It made the bullshit easier to take, knowing she was in my corner.

American indie rock singer-songwriter Lindsey Jordan (known professionally as Snail Mail) has cited Gordon as an important influence.

== Discography ==
=== Solo ===
- SYR5 (with DJ Olive and Ikue Mori) (2000)
- Yokokimthurston (with Yoko Ono and Thurston Moore) (2012)
- No Home Record (2019)
- At Issue (2022) (with Loren Connors)
- The Collective (2024)
- Play Me (2026)

=== Free Kitten ===
- Unboxed (1994)
- Nice Ass (1995)
- Sentimental Education (1997)
- Inherit (2008)

=== Body/Head ===
- Body/Head 12" (2013)
- Coming Apart (2013)
- No Waves (2016)
- The Switch (2018)

=== Glitterbust ===
- Glitterbust (2016)

== Filmography ==
Year	Title	Role	Notes	Ref.
1989	The Whole World is Watching: Weatherman '69	Bernadine Dohrn		
1992	1991: The Year Punk Broke	Herself	Documentary film	
2005	Last Days	Record Executive		
2006	Gilmore Girls	Cool Mom Troubadour	Episode: "Partings"	
2007	Boarding Gate	Kay		
2007	I'm Not There	Carla Hendricks		
2009	Gossip Girl	Herself	Episode: "Rufus Getting Married"	
2013	Une Danse Des Bouffons	Maria Martins	Short film	
2014	Girls	Mindy	Episode: "Females Only"	
2014	Portlandia	Herself	Episode: "Pull-Out King"	
2015	The Nightmare	English poetry teacher	German title: "Der Nachtmar"	
2016	Imponderable	Madame Vesta		
2016	The Realest Real	Herself	Short film	
2017	Animals	Tulip	Episode: "Rats"	
2018	Don't Worry, He Won't Get Far on Foot	Corky		
2025	The Chronology of Water			

== Publications ==
- Gordon, Kim (2014). Is It My Body? – Selected Texts. Berlin, Germany: Sternberg Press. ISBN 978-3-95679-038-6.
- Gordon, Kim (2015). Girl in a Band: A Memoir. New York: Dey Street Books. ISBN 978-0-062-29590-3.
- Gordon, Kim (2020). No Icon. New York: Rizzoli. ISBN 978-0-8478-6581-9.
- Gordon, Kim; Gleeson, Sinéad, eds. (2022). This Woman's Work: Essays on Music. Hachette Books. ISBN 9780306829000.

== See also ==
- Sonic Youth discography
- Experimental music
- Alternative rock

== Notes and references ==
=== Sources ===
- Blush, Steve (2016). New York Rock: From the Rise of The Velvet Underground to the Fall of CBGB. New York: Macmillan. ISBN 978-1-250-08361-6.
- Bogdanov, Vladimir; Woodstra, Chris; Erlewine, Stephen Thomas (2002). All Music Guide to Rock: The Definitive Guide to Rock, Pop, and Soul. Hal Leonard Corporation. ISBN 978-0-879-30653-3.
- Browne, David (2009). Goodbye 20th Century: A Biography of Sonic Youth. Cambridge, Massachusetts: Da Capo Press. ISBN 978-0-306-81515-7.
- Christgau, Robert (2000). Christgau's Consumer Guide: Albums of the '90s. New York: Macmillan. ISBN 978-0-312-24560-3.
- Foege, Alex (1994). Confusion Is Next: The Sonic Youth Story. New York: Macmillan. ISBN 978-0-312-11369-8.
- Gaar, Gillian G. (2002). She's a Rebel:The History of Women in Rock & Roll. New York: Seal Press. ISBN 978-1-58005-078-4.
- George-Warren, Holly; Romanowski, Patricia, eds. (2005). "Sonic Youth". The Rolling Stone Encyclopedia of Rock & Roll. New York City: Fireside. ISBN 978-0-7432-9201-6.
- Gordon, Kim (2015). Girl in a Band: A Memoir. Dey Street Books. ISBN 978-0-062-29590-3.
- Jones, Amelia; Heathfield, Adrian (2012). Perform, Repeat, Record: Live Art in History. Chicago: University of Chicago Press: Intellect Books. ISBN 978-1-841-50489-6.
- Mayshark, Jesse Fox (2007). Post-Pop Cinema: The Search for Meaning in New American Film. Westport, Connecticut: Greenwood Publishing Group. ISBN 978-0-275-99080-0.
- Molon, Dominic (2007). Sympathy for the Devil: Art and Rock and Roll Since 1967. New Haven, Connecticut: Yale University Press. ISBN 978-0-300-13426-1.
- Robins, Wayne (2008). A Brief History of Rock, Off the Record. New York: Routeledge. ISBN 978-0-415-97472-1.
- Strong, Catherine (2016). Grunge: Music and Memory. Abingdon, Oxfordshire: Routledge. ISBN 978-1-317-12436-8.
- Weglarz, Kristine; Pedelty, Mark (2016). Political Rock. Abington, Oxfordshire: Routledge, Taylor & Francis Group. ISBN 978-1-138-24563-1.
- Yarm, Mark (2011). Everybody Loves Our Town: An Oral History of Grunge. New York: Three Rivers Press. ISBN 978-0-307-46444-6.
