= Sonic Youth discography =

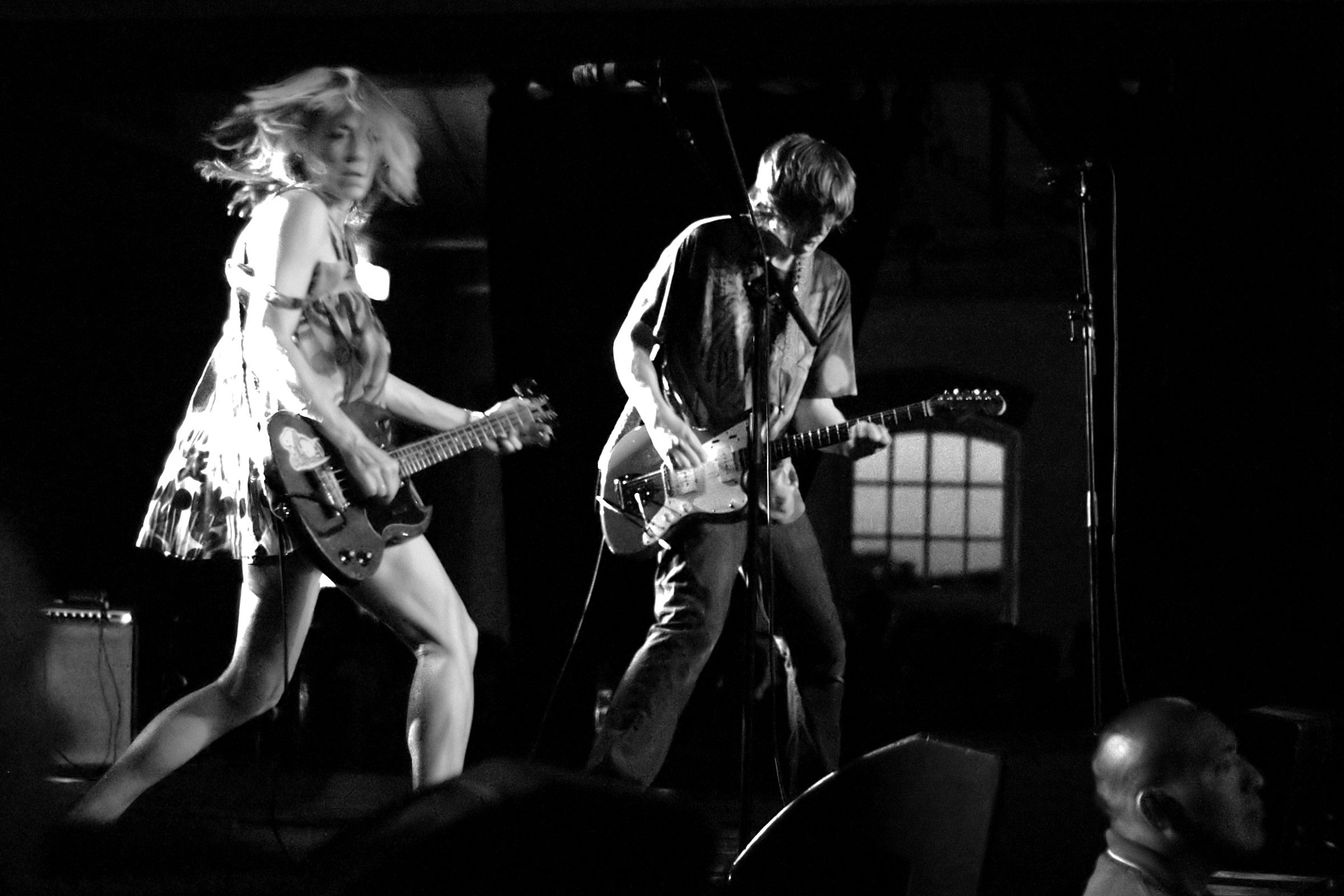
- Studio albums: 15
- Extended plays: 8
- Compilation albums: 4
- Singles: 21
- Video albums: 6
- Music videos: 46
- Sonic Youth Recordings (SYR): 10
- Bootlegs: 8
- Soundtrack and compilation appearances: 17

The discography of American rock band Sonic Youth comprises 15 studio albums, seven extended plays, three compilation albums, seven video releases, 21 singles, 46 music videos, ten releases in the Sonic Youth Recordings series, eight official bootlegs, and contributions to 16 soundtracks and other compilations.

In 1981, Sonic Youth signed with Neutral Records, and released its eponymous debut EP Sonic Youth the next year. The band's first full-length album was Confusion is Sex, released in 1983. Kill Yr Idols was released the same year under the German label Zensor Records. Bad Moon Rising was released two years later on Blast First, a label created specifically for Sonic Youth releases. In 1986, Sonic Youth signed to SST Records and released Evol later the same year. The album gained the band increasing critical acclaim and exposure, and the group released Sister and the double LP Daydream Nation in 1987 and 1988, respectively, the latter on Enigma Records.

In 1990, the band signed to major label DGC Records, and released Goo the same year. The band's 1991 tour with the then little-known band Nirvana was documented in the film 1991: The Year Punk Broke. In 1992, Sonic Youth released Dirty. Two years later, the group released Experimental Jet Set, Trash and No Star, and Washing Machine the following year.

Forced to start from scratch after its instruments and equipment were stolen, the band released NYC Ghosts & Flowers in 2000. Sonic Youth released Murray Street in the summer of 2002, followed in 2004 by Sonic Nurse. Rather Ripped and The Destroyed Room: B-sides and Rarities were released in 2006, the latter featuring tracks previously available only on vinyl, limited-release compilations, B-sides to international singles, and other previously unreleased material. The Eternal was released three years later in 2009.

== Studio albums ==
Year	Album details	Peak chart positions											Sales	Certifications
Year	Album details	US	AUS	BEL	FRA	GER	JPN	NLD	NOR	NZ	SWE	UK	Sales	Certifications
1983	Confusion Is Sex: Released: February 11, 1983; Label: Neutral	—	—	—	—	—	—	—	—	—	—	—	US: 41,100	
1985	Bad Moon Rising: Released: March 29, 1985; Label: Homestead	—	—	—	—	—	—	—	—	—	—	—	US: 33,000	
1986	Evol: Released: May 2, 1986; Label: SST	—	—	—	—	—	—	—	—	—	—	—	US: 48,400	
1987	Sister: Released: June 29, 1987; Label: SST	—	151	—	—	—	—	—	—	—	—	—	US: 72,000	
1988	Daydream Nation: Released: October 18, 1988; Label: Enigma	—	144	91	—	—	—	—	—	—	—	99	US: 162,000	
1989	The Whitey Album (as Ciccone Youth): Released: January 18, 1989; Label: Enigma	—	—	—	—	—	—	—	—	—	—	63		
1990	Goo: Released: June 26, 1990; Label: DGC	96	106	—	—	—	—	71	—	22	—	32	US: 169,000	BPI: Silver
1992	Dirty: Released: July 21, 1992; Label: DGC	83	22	—	—	59	53	57	—	5	26	6	US: 329,000; WW: 500,000	
1994	Experimental Jet Set, Trash and No Star: Released: May 10, 1994; Label: DGC	34	25	—	—	87	62	65	—	16	27	10	US: 246,000	
1995	Washing Machine: Released: September 26, 1995; Label: DGC	58	34	38	—	—	94	91	41	—	—	39	US: 159,000	
1998	A Thousand Leaves: Released: May 12, 1998; Label: DGC	85	66	28	32	84	43	—	37	—	43	38	US: 66,000	
2000	NYC Ghosts & Flowers: Released: May 16, 2000; Label: Geffen	172	—	—	61	—	—	—	37	—	—	113	US: 46,000	
2002	Murray Street: Released: June 25, 2002; Label: DGC	126	78	28	48	63	45	—	16	—	—	77	US: 63,000	
2004	Sonic Nurse: Released: June 7, 2004; Label: DGC	64	54	23	40	89	47	98	21	—	—	—	US: 65,000	
2006	Rather Ripped: Released: June 13, 2006; Label: Geffen	71	40	20	25	79	41	—	13	—	46	64		
2009	The Eternal: Released: June 9, 2009; Label: Matador	18	52	9	19	29	29	90	17	38	28	42		
"—" denotes releases that did not chart.

== Live albums ==
Year	Album details	Notes
1984	Sonic Death: Early Sonic 1981–1983: Released: 1984; Label: Ecstatic Peace!	Originally released on cassette only.
1986	Walls Have Ears: Released: 1986; Label: Not	Semi-official bootleg recording.; Double album featuring tracks from three live sets from 1985: one with Bob Bert and two with Steve Shelley.; Limited to 2,000 machine-numbered copies.; Not was a short-lived Blast First imprint.; Officially released on February 9, 2024, through Goofin'.
1991	Hold That Tiger: Released: 1991; Label: Goofin'	Recorded in 1987.
1992	Live at the Continental Club: Released: 1992; Label: Sonic Death	Recorded in 1986.; Fan club release.
2004	Hidros 3: Released: 2004; Label: Smalltown Supersound	Collaboration between Mats Gustafsson and Sonic Youth, also featuring Lindha Kallerdahl, Loren Mazzacane Connors, David Stackenäs and Lotta Melin.; Recorded in 2000.
2009	Battery Park, NYC July 4th 2008: Released: June 9, 2009; Label: Matador	Vinyl-only release (as a separate album).; CD version only released in Japan as a bonus disc to The Eternal.; Became more widely available to stream in June 2019
2012	Smart Bar Chicago 1985: Released: November 13, 2012; Label: Goofin'	
2018	Chicago, IL • Cabaret Metro • August 17, 2002: Released: 2018; Label: Nugs.net	Digital-only release from Nugs.net
2018	ABC Glasgow August 2007 Daydream Nation: Released: 2018; Label: Nugs.net	Digital-only release from Nugs.net
2018	Chicago, IL • Cabaret Metro • November 5, 1988: Released: 2018; Label: Nugs.net	Digital-only release from Nugs.net
2018	New York, NY • CBGB • December 13, 1988: Released: 2018; Label: Nugs.net	Digital-only release from Nugs.net
2018	Berlin, Germany • Columbiahalle • October 21, 2009: Released: 2018; Label: Nugs.net	Also released as a 2x CD-R release in 2019.
2018	Brooklyn, NY • Williamsburg Waterfront • August 12, 2011: Released: 2018; Label: Nugs.net	Digital-only release from Nugs.net
2019	Los Angeles, CA • Veterans Wadsworth Theatre • May 28, 1998: Released: 2019; Label: Nugs.net	Digital-only release from Nugs.net
2019	Asheville, NC • Orange Peel • August 20, 2004: Released: 2019; Label: Nugs.net	Digital-only release from Nugs.net
2019	Trenton, NJ • City Gardens • May 22, 1987: Released: 2019; Label: Nugs.net	Digital-only release from Nugs.net
2019	San Francisco, CA • The Warfield • March 5, 1993: Released: 2019; Label: Nugs.net	Digital-only release from Nugs.net
2019	Irvine, CA • Crawford Hall • November 3, 1990: Released: 2019; Label: Nugs.net	Digital-only release from Nugs.net
2019	Paris, France • Olympia • June 7, 2001: Released: 2019; Label: Nugs.net	Digital-only release from Nugs.net
2019	Live in Moscow April 12–13, 1989: Released: 2019; Label: Feelee Records, Squeaky Squawk	Released in late 2019 on an LP by Feelee Records and digitally on Sonic Youth's Bandcamp page; Released on February 7, 2020, on major streaming and d/l platforms; Formats: LP (300 copies), download, streaming
2020	Live in Yugoslavia 1985/1987: Released: 2020; Label: Self-released	Digital-only release from Sonic Youth's Bandcamp page
2020	Live at Brixton Academy 1992: Released: 2020; Label: Self-released	Digital-only release from Sonic Youth's Bandcamp page
2020	Live at All Tomorrows Parties 2000: Released: 2020; Label: Self-released	Digital-only release from Sonic Youth's Bandcamp page
2020	Live in Denver 1986: Released: 2020; Label: Self-released	Digital-only release from Sonic Youth's Bandcamp page
2020	World Trade Center Benefit 2001: Released: 2020; Label: Self-released	Recorded at the Bowery Ballroom NYC on October 7, 2001; Digital-only release from Sonic Youth's Bandcamp page
2021	Live in Austin 1995: Released: 2021; Label: Self-released	Recorded at the Austin Music Hall, on November 15, 1995; Digital-only release from Sonic Youth's Bandcamp page
2021	Live in Dallas 2006: Released: 2021; Label: Self-released	Recorded at the Gypsy Tea Room, in Dallas on June 24, 2006; Digital-only release from Sonic Youth's Bandcamp page
2022	Live in Kyiv, Ukraine 1989: Released: April 14, 2022; Label: Self-released	Recorded at DK KPI, in Kyiv, Ukraine on April 14, 1989; Digital-only release from Sonic Youth's Bandcamp page
2023	Live in Brooklyn 2011: Released: August 18, 2023; Label: Silver Current Records and Goofin'	Remixed and remastered release of Brooklyn, NY • Williamsburg Waterfront • August 12, 2011
2026	Diamond Seas: Released: April 18, 2026; Label: Geffen	32 live performances of "The Diamond Sea" from 1995 and 1996, plunderphonicaly orchestrated by John Oswald

== Extended plays ==
Year	EP details	Notes
1982	Sonic Youth: Released: March 1982; Label: Neutral	Considered by the band to be their first studio album.
1983	Kill Yr Idols: Released: October 1983; Label: Zensor	Released on CD with Confusion Is Sex by Geffen in 1995.
1987	Master-Dik: Released: November 1987; Label: Blast First	The band's official site lists the record as having possibly been released on January 22, 1988.; Peaked at #106 in UK
1993	Whores Moaning: Released: February 1993; Label: Geffen	Released for Australian/New Zealand tour.; Peaked at #44 in Australia and #33 in New Zealand
1994	TV Shit: Released: February 1994; Label: Ecstatic Peace! (E #38)	With Yamatsuka Eye.
1998	Silver Session for Jason Knuth: Released: July 14, 1998; Label: Sonic Knuth	Dedicated to Sonic Youth fan and radio DJ Jason Knuth.
2001	In the Fishtank 9: Released: July 2001; Label: Konkurrent	With Instant Composers Pool and The Ex.
2002	Kali Yug Express: Released: 2002; Label: Geffen	
2009	Sensational Fix: Released: January 2009; Label: Matador	

== Compilations ==
Year	Compilation details	Notes
1995	Screaming Fields of Sonic Love: Released: April 25, 1995; Label: DGC	Compilation of songs from 1982 to 1989. The original promo version was released in 1994.
2006	The Destroyed Room: B-Sides and Rarities: Released: December 12, 2006; Label: Geffen	Compilation of various B-sides and other rare material.
2008	Hits Are for Squares: Released: June 10, 2008; Label: Starbucks	Compilation of songs chosen by various celebrities, plus an original song.
2016	Spinhead Sessions 1986: Released: June 17, 2016; Label: Goofin'	Rehearsal recordings made in preparation for the Made in USA soundtrack album.
2020	Rarities 1: Released: August 7, 2020; Label: Self-released	Digital-only release from Sonic Youth's Bandcamp page.
2020	Rarities 2: Released: September 4, 2020; Label: Self-released	Digital-only release from Sonic Youth's Bandcamp page.
2020	Rarities 3: Released: October 2, 2020; Label: Self-released	Digital-only release from Sonic Youth's Bandcamp page.
2022	In/Out/In: Released: March 18, 2022; Label: Three Lobed Recordings	Five songs recorded between 2000 and 2010.

== Sonic Youth Recordings (SYR) series ==
Sonic Youth have released a number of mostly experimental and instrumental releases under their own label Sonic Youth Recordings. The SYR series has established a tradition where each album is released in a different language. SYR1 has song titles and album sleeve artwork all in French, SYR2 is in Dutch, SYR3 is in Esperanto, SYR4 is in English, SYR5 is in Japanese, SYR6 is in Lithuanian, SYR7 is in Arpitan, SYR8 is in Danish, SYR9 is in French, and AUG5 is in English.

Year	Album details	Notes
1997	SYR1: Anagrama: Released: June 10, 1997	
1997	SYR2: Slaapkamers met slagroom: Released: September 2, 1997	
1998	SYR3: Invito al ĉielo: Released: February 24, 1998	Sonic Youth's first collaboration with Jim O'Rourke.
1999	SYR4: Goodbye 20th Century: Released: November 16, 1999	Double-album featuring covers of avant-garde compositions. Collaboration between Sonic Youth and William Winant, Jim O'Rourke, Takehisa Kosugi, Christian Wolff, Coco Hayley Gordon Moore, Christian Marclay, and Wharton Tiers.
2000	SYR5: ミュージカル パ一スペクティブ: Released: August 29, 2000	Collaboration between Kim Gordon, DJ Olive, and Ikue Mori.
2005	SYR6: Koncertas Stan Brakhage prisiminimui: Released: December 6, 2005	Live recording of an Anthology Film Archives benefit show, played to silent films of Stan Brakhage. Featuring Tim Barnes. It is a CD-only release.
2008	SYR7: J'Accuse Ted Hughes: Released: April 22, 2008	It is a vinyl-only release.
2008	SYR8: Andre Sider Af Sonic Youth: Released: July 28, 2008	It is a CD-only release. Live recording of the 2005 Roskilde Festival in Denmark. Featuring Jim O'Rourke, Mats Gustafsson, and Merzbow.
2011	SYR9: Simon Werner a disparu: Released: February 15, 2011	Soundtrack to the film Simon Werner a disparu.
2020	AUG5: Perspectives Musicales – Live at Cat's Cradle 2000: Released: 2020	Digital-only release from Sonic Youth's Bandcamp page. Live recording At Cat's Cradle 2000.

== Official bootlegs ==
Year	Title	Notes
1988	Stick Me Donna Majick Momma	Bootleg 7-inch single. The title track being a studio recording from 1985 and an early version of "Expressway to Yr. Skull", while track two was recorded live on October 30, 1983, in Berlin, Germany.
1990	4 Tunna Brix	Four covers of songs by The Fall (one being a cover of a cover of a Kinks song), recorded at the BBC for the John Peel show.
1991	Goo Demos	Fan club release.; Collection of demos for the Goo album.
1994	Live in Bremen	Picture disc.; Possibly released in 1995.
1995	Live Venlo, Holland December 27, 1983	Live show from 1983, released through the band's fan club.; Actual recording date is November 27, 1983.
1995	Blastic Scene	This bootleg had a semi-official release; recorded July 14, 1993, at Campo Pequeno in Lisbon

== Singles ==
Year	Single	Peak chart positions					Album
Year	Single	US Alt.	AUS	IRL	NZ	UK	Album
1984	"Death Valley '69"	—	—	—	—	—	Bad Moon Rising
1985	"Flower/Halloween"	—	—	—	—	—	Bad Moon Rising
1986	"Flower / Satan Is Boring"	—	—	—	—	—	Bad Moon Rising
1986	"Starpower"	—	—	—	—	—	Evol
1986	"Into the Groove(y)" (as Ciccone Youth)	—	—	—	—	165	The Whitey Album
1988	"Teen Age Riot"	20	—	—	—	—	Daydream Nation
1988	"Silver Rocket"	—	—	—	—	—	Daydream Nation
1989	"Candle"	—	—	—	—	—	Daydream Nation
1989	"Providence"	—	—	—	—	—	Daydream Nation
1989	"Touch Me I'm Sick/Halloween"	—	—	—	—	111	split with Mudhoney
1990	"Kool Thing"	7	—	24	—	81	Goo
1990	"Disappearer"	—	—	—	—	—	Goo
1991	"Dirty Boots"	—	—	—	—	—	Goo
1992	"100%"	4	67	—	30	28	Dirty
1992	"Youth Against Fascism"	—	— (Note: "Youth Against Fascism" did not enter the Australia Singles Chart, but peaked at number four on the Australia Alternative Singles Chart.)	—	39	52	Dirty
1993	"Sugar Kane"	—	— (Note: "Sugar Kane" did not enter the Australia Singles Chart, but peaked at number eight on the Australia Alternative Singles Chart.)	—	—	26	Dirty
1993	"Drunken Butterfly"	—	—	—	—	—	Dirty
1994	"Bull in the Heather"	13	90	—	—	24	Experimental Jet Set, Trash and No Star
1994	"Superstar"	26	— (Note: "Superstar" did not enter the Australia Singles Chart, but peaked at number 20 on the Australia Hit Seekers Singles chart.)	—	—	45	If I Were a Carpenter
1995	"The Diamond Sea"	—	— (Note: "The Diamond Sea" did not enter the Australia Singles Chart, but peaked at number four on the Australia Alternative Singles Chart.)	—	—	—	Washing Machine
1996	"Little Trouble Girl"	—	—	—	—	81	Washing Machine
1998	"Sunday"	—	—	—	—	72	A Thousand Leaves
2000	"Nevermind (What Was It Anyway)"	—	—	—	—	—	NYC Ghosts & Flowers
2003	"Kim Gordon & The Arthur Doyle Hand Cream"	—	—	—	—	—	split with Erase Errata
2006	"Helen Lundeberg/Eyeliner"	—	—	—	—	—	Rather Ripped
2006	"Incinerate"	—	—	—	—	—	Rather Ripped
2006	"Beautiful Plateau"	—	—	—	—	—	The Destroyed Room
2019	"Bull in the Heather" (live)	—	—	—	—	—	Battery Park, NYC: July 4th 2008
2026	"... Scream"						Scream
"—" denotes releases that did not chart.

== Music videos ==
Year	Title	Director
1985	"Death Valley '69"	Richard Kern
1986	"Shadow of a Doubt"	Kevin Kerslake
1987	"Beauty Lies in the Eye"	Kevin Kerslake
1988	"Teen Age Riot"	Sonic Youth
1988	"Silver Rocket"	Charles Atlas
1988	"Providence"	Peter Fowler; Sonic Youth
1988	"Candle"	Kevin Kerslake
1988	"Addicted to Love" (as Ciccone Youth)	Kim Gordon
1988	"Macbeth" (as Ciccone Youth)	Dave Markey
1990	"Kool Thing"	Tamra Davis
1990	"Disappearer"	Todd Haynes
1991	"Dirty Boots"	Tamra Davis
1991	"Tunic (Song for Karen)"	Tony Oursler
1991	"Mary-Christ"	Steve Shelley
1991	"Mote"	Ray Agony
1991	"My Friend Goo"	Dave Markey; Joe Cole; Kim Gordon; Thurston Moore
1991	"Mildred Pierce"	Dave Markey
1991	"Cinderella's Big Score"	Dave Markey
1991	"Scooter + Jinx"	Richard Kern
1991	"Titanium Expose"	Phil Morrison
1992	"100%"	Tamra Davis; Spike Jonze
1992	"Youth Against Fascism"	Nick Egan
1993	"Sugar Kane"	Nick Egan
1993	"Drunken Butterfly"	Stephen Hellweg
1993	"Swimsuit Issue"	Morty
1994	"Bull in the Heather"	Tamra Davis; Kim Gordon
1994	"Superstar"	Dave Markey
1995	"Little Trouble Girl"	Mark Romanek
1995	"The Diamond Sea"	Spike Jonze; Lance Bangs; Dave Markey; Steve Paine; Angus Wall
1998	"Sunday"	Harmony Korine
1998	"Hoarfrost"	Lee Ranaldo
1999	"Piano Piece No. 13 (Carpenter's Piece)"	Sonic Youth
2000	"Nevermind (What was it Anyway)"	Kim Gordon; Jim O'Rourke; Chris Habib
2002	"The Empty Page"	Thurston Moore; Chris Habib
2002	"Disconnection Notice"	Tom Surgal
2004	"Peace Attack"	Chris Habib
2004	"I Love You Golden Blue"	Dave Markey
2006	"Incinerate"	Claire Denis
2006	"Do You Believe In Rapture?"	Braden King
2006	"Jams Run Free"	Claire Denis
2006	"Reena"	Braden King
2009	"Sacred Trickster"	Tom Surgal
2009	"What We Know"	Chris Habib

== Soundtracks, tributes and other compilation appearances ==
Year	Title	Track(s)
1981	Noise Fest	Untitled live track
1986	Sub Pop 100	"Kill Yr Idols"
1988	Fast 'n' Bulbous – A Tribute to Captain Beefheart	"Electricity" (by Captain Beefheart)
1988	Sgt. Pepper Knew My Father	"Within You Without You" (by The Beatles)
1988	The Melting Plot	"I Am Right" (by Saccharine Trust)
1989	The Bridge: A Tribute to Neil Young	"Computer Age" (by Neil Young)
1990	Pump Up the Volume (Music From the Original Motion Picture Soundtrack)	"Titanium Exposé"
1992	Fortune Cookie Prize: A Tribute to Beat Happening	"Black Candy" (by Beat Happening)
1993	Judgment Night: Music from the Motion Picture	"I Love You Mary Jane" with Cypress Hill
1994	If I Were a Carpenter	"Superstar" (by The Carpenters)
1994	DGC Rarities Volume 1	"Compilation Blues"
1995	My So-Called Life (Music from the Television Series)	"Genetic"
1995	Made in USA	Original Score.
1997	SubUrbia: Original Motion Picture Soundtrack	Three original songs and one from a Thurston Moore solo album.
1997	Nowhere: Music from the Gregg Araki Movie	"Hendrix Necro"
1999	Pola X soundtrack	"Blink"
2002	Demonlover soundtrack	Eight original songs.
2003	You Can Never Go Fast Enough	"Loop Cat"
2006	From the Kitchen Archives No. 3 – Amplified: New Music Meets; Rock 1981–1986	"World Looks Red" and "Shaking Hell"
2006	The Harry Smith Project: The Anthology of American Folk Music Revisited	"Dry Bones" with Roswell Rudd
2007	Like a Hurricane: A Tribute to Neil Young	"Computer Age" (by Neil Young) same recording as before
2007	I'm Not There soundtrack	"I'm Not There"
2008	Music from the Motion Picture Juno	"Superstar"
2011	Not The Spaces You Know, But Between Them	"In & Out" and "Out & In"

== Video releases ==
Year	Video details	Notes
1985	Live at Stache's: Released: 1985; Label: Altavistic (ATV #2)	Concert video filmed on August 1, 1985, in Columbus, Ohio.
1991	Goo: Released: 1991; Label: DGC (DGC #V-39508)	Compilation of music videos for every song on Goo.; Featured on Corporate Ghost: The Videos: 1990–2002.
1992	Gila Monster Jamboree: Released: 1992; Label: Sonic Death (SD #13005)	Concert video filmed on January 5, 1985, in the Mojave Desert.
1993	1991: The Year Punk Broke: Released: 1993; Label: DGC (DGC #V-39518)	Documentary featuring various alternative rock bands, mostly Sonic Youth.
1995	Screaming Fields of Sonic Love: Released: 1995; Label: DGC (DGC #V-39550)	Collects all of the band's pre-DGC music videos and a couple of live performances.
2004	Corporate Ghost: The Videos: 1990–2002: Released: June 8, 2004; Label: Geffen (GEF #75409)	Compilation DVD of the band's Geffen-era videos, from 1990 to 2002.; Certified gold in Canada.
