= Corporate Ghost: The Videos: 1990–2002 =

2004 DVD of Sonic Youth music videos

Video by Sonic Youth
- Released: 2004
- Recorded: 1990–2002
- Label: DGC

Corporate Ghost is a Sonic Youth DVD released by DGC in 2004. It is a collection of their music videos from 1990 to 2002.

DVD was certified by Music Canada Gold in October 2004 for 5,000 sold copies.

== The videos ==
Dirty Boots

- From the album Goo
- Directed by Tamra Davis

Tunic (Song for Karen)

- From the album Goo
- Directed by Tony Oursler

Mary-Christ

- From the album Goo
- Directed by Steve Shelley

Kool Thing

- From the album Goo
- Directed by Tamra Davis
- Guest appearance by Chuck D

Mote

- From the album Goo
- Directed by Ray Agony

My Friend Goo

- From the album Goo
- Directed by Dave Markey, Joe Cole, Kim Gordon and Thurston Moore
- Guest appearances by Joe Cole and Mike Watt

Disappearer

- From the album Goo
- Directed by Todd Haynes

Mildred Pierce

- From the album Goo
- Directed by Dave Markey
- Guest appearances by Sophia Coppola and Sally STP

Cinderella's Big Score

- From the album Goo
- Directed by Dave Markey
- Guest appearances by Bill Bartell and Chris Cohen

Scooter & Jinx

- From the album Goo
- Directed by Richard Kern
- Guest appearances by Karen Disney and Linda Serbu

Titanium Exposé

- From the album Goo
- Directed by Phil Morrison

100%

- From the album Dirty
- Directed by Tamra Davis and Spike Jonze
- Guest appearances by Jason Lee and Guy Mariano

Sugar Kane

- From the album Dirty
- Directed by Nick Egan
- Guest appearance by Chloë Sevigny

Youth Against Fascism

- From the album Dirty
- Directed by Nick Egan

Bull in the Heather

- From the album Experimental Jet Set, Trash and No Star
- Directed by Tamra Davis and Kim Gordon
- Guest appearance by Kathleen Hanna

Superstar

- From the album If I Were a Carpenter
- Directed by Dave Markey

Little Trouble Girl

- From the album Washing Machine
- Directed by Mark Romanek
- Guest appearance by Kim Deal

The Diamond Sea

- From the album Washing Machine
- Directed by Spike Jonze, Lance Bangs, Dave Markey, Steve Paine and Angus Wall

Sunday

- From the album A Thousand Leaves
- Directed by Harmony Korine
- Guest appearances by Macaulay Culkin and Rachel Miner

Hoarfrost

- From the album A Thousand Leaves
- Directed by Lee Ranaldo
- Guest appearance by Leah Singer

Nevermind (What Was It Anyway)

- From the album NYC Ghosts & Flowers
- Directed by frogme
- Guest appearances by Pierre Bailly and Sleater-Kinney

The Empty Page

- From the album Murray Street
- Directed by Thurston Moore and Chris Habib

Disconnection Notice

- From the album Murray Street
- Directed by Tom Surgal
- Guest appearances by Eszter Balint, Markus Miller, Linas Phillips and Clay Weiner

== Bonus videos ==
Drunken Butterfly

- From the album Dirty
- Directed by Stephen Hellweg (MTV 120 Minutes/Sonic Youth homemade video contest winner)

Swimsuit Issue

- From the album Dirty
- Directed by Morty (MTV 120 Minutes/Sonic Youth homemade video contest runner-up)

Disappearer (Director's Cut)

- From the album Goo
- Directed by Todd Haynes

Thurston Moore - Ono Soul

- From the album Psychic Hearts
- Directed by Dave Markey

== Bonus material ==
Interviews

- Lance Bangs
- Tamra Davis
- Kathleen Hannah
- Todd Haynes
- Richard Kern
- Jason Lee
- Dave Markey
- Mike Watt

Video commentaries

- Tamra Davis
- Todd Haynes
- Richard Kern
- Dave Markey
- Phil Morrison
- Mark Romanek
- Sonic Youth
- Tom Surgal
- Mike Watt

Other

- Spike Jonze photo memory montage
- "My Sonic Room": a fan film document by Patty Orsini from 1990.
- Sonic Youth "Corporate Ghost" sticker
