= Hold That Tiger =

Hold That Tiger may refer to:

- "Tiger Rag", a jazz standard
- Hold That Tiger (The Muddy Basin Ramblers album)
- Hold That Tiger (Sonic Youth album)
- Hold That Tiger (horse)
