= Smart Bar Chicago 1985 =

Live album by Sonic Youth
- Released: November 13, 2012
- Recorded: August 11, 1985
- Venues: Smart Bar, Chicago, United States
- Genres: Experimental rock; alternative rock; noise rock
- Length: 67:02
- Label: Goofin'
- Producers: Aaron Mullan; Steve Shelley

Sonic Youth live album chronology
Battery Park, NYC July 4th 2008 (2009)	Smart Bar Chicago 1985 (2012)

Smart Bar Chicago 1985 is a live album by American alternative rock band Sonic Youth, released on November 13, 2012, on Goofin' Records. It features a live 4-track recording of the band's performance at the Smart Bar in Chicago, Illinois, on August 11, 1985, during the tour in support of Sonic Youth's second studio album, Bad Moon Rising (1985).

== Release ==
Smart Bar Chicago 1985 was released on November 13, 2012, on Goofin' Records. It was announced for release on September 10 on the band's official web site and "Intro"/"Brave Men Run" was made available for streaming on YouTube on October 15. The album was issued on CD, double LP and as a digital download from online retailers. Upon its release, it charted in Belgium, peaking at No. 182 on Wallonia's Ultratop chart.

== Reception ==
Professional ratings
Review scores
Source	Rating
AllMusic	4.5/5 stars
Drowned in Sound	7/10
Louder Sound	4/5 stars
Record Collector	4/5 stars
Rolling Stone	3.5/5 stars
Spectrum Culture	3.5/5

Upon its release, Smart Bar Chicago 1985 received positive acclaim from critics. AllMusic reviewer Fred Thomas wrote, "The band sounds locked into a collective meditation for much of the set, stringing together the long and discordant segments of songs into a mostly uninterrupted hour and change of sound." Thomas later added, "Without besting the album versions, almost every song here offers a more vivid, more extreme counterpoint to its better-known studio side" and summarized the album as "unpolished, tormented, hungry, and constantly threatening to crumble into godless noise." Writing for Drowned in Sound, Noel Gardner said, "On 'Brave Men Run (In My Family)', [Steve] Shelley elevates it with a near-classic rock fluidity to his playing [...] 'I Love Her All the Time' feels like a Moore vehicle, much like on record, but has great gobs of anti-rock no wave atmos; 'Ghost Bitch' is considerably more abrasive here, [Kim] Gordon sounding less like a coffee house poet than an untamed punk vocalist—Penelope Houston, say." Gardner rated the album 7 out of 10 and summarized: "Smart Bar – Chicago 1985 is not going to change perceptions of either Sonic Youth or live albums: it's a decent recording strictly for fans." Describing the album as "a taste of glories to come", Rolling Stone writer Rob Sheffield awarded the album 3.5 out of 5 stars and noted "Expressway to Yr Skull" and "Secret Girl" as highlights, adding, "The peak is the early ballad 'I Love Her All the Time'—noisy, emotionally alive, jittery with excitement for the future." In his review in Smart Bar Chicago 1985's liner notes, Aaron Mullan referred to the album as "brilliant" and the show itself as "a killer show." He added, "The material is also so visceral and improvisatory that it greatly benefits from the additional perspective offered by a live recording."

== Track listing ==
All music is composed by Sonic Youth.

No.	Title	Lyrics	Studio version	Length
1.	"Hallowe'en"	Kim Gordon	Bad Moon Rising, 1985	5:42
2.	"Death Valley '69"	Lydia Lunch, Thurston Moore	Bad Moon Rising	7:20
3.	"Intro"/"Brave Men Run (In My Family)"	Gordon	Bad Moon Rising	4:51
4.	"I Love Her All the Time"	Moore	Bad Moon Rising	5:20
5.	"Ghost Bitch"	Gordon	Bad Moon Rising	5:55
6.	"I'm Insane"	Moore	Bad Moon Rising	5:20
7.	"Kat 'n' Hat"	(Instrumental)	previously unreleased	3:36
8.	"Brother James"	Gordon	Kill Yr Idols, 1983	2:50
9.	"Kill Yr Idols"	Moore	Kill Yr Idols	2:32
10.	"Secret Girl"	Gordon	EVOL, 1986	3:13
11.	"Flower"	Gordon	Bad Moon Rising	2:36
12.	"The Burning Spear"	Moore	Sonic Youth, 1982	5:01
13.	"Expressway to Yr Skull"	Moore	EVOL	9:04
14.	"Making the Nature Scene"	Gordon	Confusion Is Sex	3:42
Total length:				67:02

== Personnel ==
All personnel credits adapted from Smart Bar Chicago 1985's liner notes.

Sonic Youth

- Thurston Moore – vocals, guitar
- Kim Gordon – vocals, bass
- Lee Ranaldo – guitar, layout, photography
- Steve Shelley – drums, mixing

Technical personnel

- Rich Menning – recording
- Aaron Mullan – mixing, liner notes
- John Golden – mastering

Design personnel

- Cody Ranaldo – artwork
- Steve Koress – photography
- Pat Blashil – photography
- Gerard Cosloy – liner notes

== Chart positions ==
Chart (2012)	Peak position
Belgian Albums Chart (Wallonia)	182
