= Kool Thing =

Single by Sonic Youth

from the album Goo
- B-side: "That's All I Know (Right Now)"; "Dirty Boots"
- Released: June 1990
- Recorded: March–April 1990
- Studio: Sorcerer Sound Recording Studios and Greene Street Recording, New York City
- Genre: Alternative rock; grunge
- Length: 4:06
- Label: DGC
- Songwriters: Kim Gordon; Thurston Moore; Lee Ranaldo; Steve Shelley
- Producers: Nick Sansano; Ron Saint Germain

Sonic Youth singles chronology
"Touch Me I'm Sick" (1988)	"Kool Thing" (1990)	"Dirty Boots" (1991)

Alternate cover
- UK cassette and US 12" cover

Music video
- "Kool Thing" on YouTube

"Kool Thing" is a song by American rock band Sonic Youth, released in June 1990 in the United States (as a promotional single) and September 1990 in Europe, as the first single from their sixth studio album Goo. The song was inspired by an interview bassist/singer Kim Gordon conducted with LL Cool J for Spin. Although he is never mentioned by name, the song's lyrics contain several references to LL Cool J. Gordon's lyrics make reference to several of the rapper's works, including the single "I Can't Live Without My Radio" and the album Walking with a Panther. She also repeats the line "I don't think so", which appears in LL Cool J's "Going Back to Cali". Chuck D also contributed spoken vocals to the song.

== Critical reception ==
David Fricke of Rolling Stone referred to the song as "sexually charged," praising Thurston Moore and Steve Shelley's guitar and drum work, respectively. Also from Rolling Stone, Matthew Perpetua designated the song as a "feminist anthem." Jason Ankeny of AllMusic believed the song "teeters on the brink of a cultural breakthrough but falls just shy of the mark." Robert Christgau praised Kim Gordon's performance on the song, citing "Kool Thing" as a standout track from Goo.

== Music video ==
The music video for "Kool Thing", released on June 4, 1990, was the band's first for a major label. The video was directed by Tamra Davis. The video focused on Gordon's fascination with 1960s radicalism (particularly Patty Hearst and the Black Panthers), and featured the band wearing glam style clothing. The video was stylized after LL Cool J's "Going Back to Cali" video, down to the black-and-white camera and go-go dancers. Gordon initially wanted to wear a beret and carry an Uzi, as a self-described "poseur-leftist girl lusting after Black Panthers concept". However, Geffen vetoed the plan. Chuck D appeared in the video.

Spin designated the video as one of the greatest music videos of 1990.

== Live performances ==
On July 29, 1992, Sonic Youth performed "Kool Thing" on Hangin' with MTV in New York City.

== Legacy ==
Brian Molko of Placebo said that "Kool Thing" was the first song he ever heard by Sonic Youth, adding that if it were not for them, his own band would never have existed.

"Kool Thing" has also been frequently featured in TV shows, films and video games, including Guitar Hero III: Legends of Rock, Simple Men, Gilmore Girls, True Crime: New York City, Once Upon a Time and Mr. Robot, in addition to appearing as downloadable content for Rock Band.

== Track listings and formats ==
- 7" vinyl and cassette single
1. "Kool Thing" (LP version) – 4:04
2. "That's All I Know (Right Now)" – 2:30
- 12" vinyl
1. "Kool Thing" (LP version) – 4:04
2. "That's All I Know (Right Now)" – 2:30
3. "Kool Thing" (8 track demo version) – 4:13
- CD single
1. "Kool Thing" (LP version) – 4:07
2. "That's All I Know (Right Now)" – 2:18
3. "Dirty Boots" (Rock & Roll Heaven version) – 5:26
4. "Kool Thing" (8 track demo version) – 4:13

== Credits and personnel ==
Credits and personnel are adapted from the Goo album liner notes.

Sonic Youth

- Thurston Moore – guitar, production
- Lee Ranaldo – guitar, vocals, production
- Kim Gordon – vocals, bass guitar, production
- Steve Shelley – drums, percussion, production

Guest musicians

- Chuck D – additional vocals

Technical

- Nick Sansano – production, recording, additional percussion
- Ron Saint Germain – production, engineering, mixing
- Nick Sansano – additional engineering
- Dan Wood – assistant engineering
- John Herman – assistant engineering
- Judy Kirschner – assistant engineering
- Howie Weinberg – mastering

== Charts ==
Chart (1990)	Peak position
Ireland (IRMA)	24
UK Singles (Official Charts)	81
US Alternative Airplay (Billboard)	7
