= Hold That Tiger (Sonic Youth album) =

Live album by Sonic Youth
- Released: 1991
- Recorded: October 14, 1987
- Studio: Chicago, United States
- Genre: Alternative rock; noise rock
- Length: 58:38
- Label: Goofin'

Sonic Youth live album chronology
Walls Have Ears (1986)	Hold That Tiger (1991)	Live at the Continental Club (1992)

Professional ratings
Review scores
Source	Rating
AllMusic	3/5 stars

Hold That Tiger is a live album by American indie rock band Sonic Youth, recorded at the Cabaret Metro in Chicago on October 14, 1987. The bulk of the set comprises several songs from the band's then-current album Sister along with material from their two previous albums EVOL and Bad Moon Rising, followed by an encore set of cover songs by The Ramones. originally released by Sonic Youth's "bootleg" label Goofin' Records, first on vinyl LP in 1991 and then on CD in 1998, the tape of the live recording was sped up to fit on the vinyl release and kept at that speed for the CD as well. The tape's original speed was restored with official digital releases Sonic Youth's Bandcamp pages and on subsequent streaming platforms.

The material present on Hold That Tiger was recorded by Aadam Jacobs of the Aadam Jacobs Collection.

== Reception ==
Writing a retrospective review for AllMusic, Brian Flota said, "Sonic Youth is on safe ground here, not indulging themselves in the guitar freakouts that they frequently showcase during their live sets".

== Track listing ==
All tracks written by Sonic Youth except for the encore.

1. "Intro" - 00:43
2. "Schizophrenia" - 04:31
3. "Tom Violence" - 02:44
4. "White Cross" - 02:58
5. "Kotton Krown" - 04:05
6. "Stereo Sanctity" - 03:28
7. "Brother James" - 03:22
8. "Pipeline/Kill Time" - 04:04
9. "Catholic Block" - 03:55
10. "Tuff Gnarl" - 03:27
11. "Death Valley '69" - 4:50
12. "Beauty Lies in the Eye" - 02:40
13. "Expressway to Yr. Skull" - 04:33
14. "Pacific Coast Highway" - 05:00

Encore - Ramones Covers

15. "Loudmouth" - 02:02
16. "I Don't Want to Walk Around with You" - 01:34
17. "Today Your Love, Tomorrow the World" - 02:01
18. "Beat on the Brat" - 02:41
