= Washing Machine (album) =

Studio album by Sonic Youth
- Released: September 26, 1995
- Recorded: January – May 1995
- Studios: Easley Studios (Memphis, Tennessee); Mott and Greene Street Studios (New York City)
- Genre: Noise rock
- Length: 68:17
- Label: DGC
- Producers: Sonic Youth, John Siket

Sonic Youth chronology
Screaming Fields of Sonic Love (1995)	Washing Machine (1995)	SYR1: Anagrama (1997)

Sonic Youth studio album chronology
Experimental Jet Set, Trash and No Star (1994)	Washing Machine (1995)	A Thousand Leaves (1998)

Singles from Washing Machine
- 1. "The Diamond Sea" Released: October 30, 1995; 2. "Little Trouble Girl" Released: April 15, 1996

Washing Machine is the ninth studio album by the American experimental rock band Sonic Youth, released on September 26, 1995, by DGC Records. It was recorded at Easley Studios in Memphis, Tennessee, and produced by the band and John Siket, who also engineered the band's previous two albums. The album features more open-ended pieces than its predecessors and contains some of the band's longest songs, including the 20-minute ballad "The Diamond Sea", which is the lengthiest track to feature on any of Sonic Youth's studio albums.

Released shortly after the band concluded their stint headlining the 1995 Lollapalooza music festival, Washing Machine reached No. 58 on the US Billboard 200 chart and No. 39 on the UK Albums Chart. Two songs from the album, "The Diamond Sea" and "Little Trouble Girl", were released as singles. The album received generally positive reviews from music critics, who praised the band for exploring new challenges as well as the guitar playing of band members Thurston Moore and Lee Ranaldo. It was ranked No. 18 in The Village Voice's 1995 Pazz & Jop critics' poll of the best albums of the year.

== Background and recording ==
Washing Machine is the follow-up to Sonic Youth's 1994 album Experimental Jet Set, Trash and No Star. After Experimental Jet Set, the band decided to take a hiatus from performing live and concentrated on numerous side projects. Band member Kim Gordon played with Julia Cafritz of Pussy Galore in Free Kitten, drummer Steve Shelley performed with Jad Fair of Half Japanese in Mosquito, guitarist Lee Ranaldo played with free jazz drummer William Hooker, and singer and guitarist Thurston Moore released his first solo album, Psychic Hearts. Moore and Gordon also had their first child, Coco. According to Moore, their daughter had provided a different perspective for the band: "I'm more focused and level-headed. There's a sublime awareness factor of your spiritual place in the world. I feel more at ease with myself ... Babies are little Buddhas. They're completely great".

Washing Machine was recorded at Easley McCain Recording in Memphis, where some indie rock bands like Pavement, Guided by Voices, and Grifters had previously recorded albums. Moore remarked that the atmosphere in Memphis helped them disconnect from the people who were constantly following the band. He also felt that Washing Machine was conceived and recorded like some of the band's first albums, stating that it "hearkens back to records like Sister where we'd write a bunch of songs, go into the studio for a month, put them down, then go on the road and play them for a year. By the end of the year they'd mutate into something much more excited". Gordon credited Memphis for its relaxed atmosphere, and cited the album as one of her favorites and her favorite recording experience.

The song "The Diamond Sea" is notable for its 19:35 duration. Moore explained the length of some of the album's songs: "We all have different aesthetics as to how songs should work. I generally push for a lot of abandon while some people in the group are more interested in truncating things. If I was the leader as much as people say I am, every song would be 20 minutes long". The unlisted ninth track (officially titled "Becuz Coda") was originally part of the opening track "Becuz", but the record label felt they needed to cut the seven-and-a-half-minute track to make the album's opening more accessible. The album was produced by Sonic Youth and John Siket, who also engineered the band's previous two albums. Mixing took place at Greene Street Studios in New York City in June 1995.

== Music and lyrics ==
Unlike Experimental Jet Set, which was described as difficult and claustrophobic, Washing Machine is considerably more open-ended and contains some of the band's longest songs. Excluding Sonic Youth Recordings releases, the final track, "The Diamond Sea", is the lengthiest track on any Sonic Youth album. The song was edited down to 5:15 for release as a single, which included an alternate 25-minute version as an additional track. Washing Machine is the band's first album on which Gordon almost exclusively played guitar instead of bass, resulting in a three-guitar and drums lineup. Trouser Press remarked that the album contains musical references to the Shangri-Las and the Byrds and described its style as "[veering] between trance-guitar experiments and more concise statements." Entertainment Weekly described it thus: "These songs unfold over even-tempered rhythms and guitars that linger rather than attack. A splatter of distortion may enter, but the effect is mostly languid and wonderfully hypnotic".

Although Gordon's lyrics on Experimental Jet Set addressed gender roles and stereotypes, her contributions to Washing Machine were considered more feminine and girl-oriented. Tom Moon of Rolling Stone noted: "The title track is an odd, earnest love song; 'Panty Lies' is a playground taunt blown to absurd extremes; and '[Little] Trouble Girl', the Spector sendup, is a dramatic, earnest coming-of-age story". The latter was described by David Browne of Entertainment Weekly as "a teen-pregnancy lullaby" and features vocals by Gordon and Kim Deal (of Pixies and the Breeders) along with other musicians. Gordon felt that Deal had an ideal voice for the melodic part and explained that the song was about "wanting to be seen for who you really are, being able to express those parts of yourself that aren't 'good girl' but that are just as real and true". Ranaldo contributed two songs, "Saucer-Like" and "Skip Tracer". The latter was co-written with his wife Leah Singer, inspired by a performance that the couple attended by riot grrrl duo Mecca Normal. The song also alludes to the band's special relationship with a major label.

The track "Junkie's Promise", sung by Moore, was described as a "heroin vignette". Although it was originally interpreted as a tribute to Kurt Cobain of Nirvana, Moore explained that the song is only about the emotional relationship between friends, with one of them being a drug addict. According to him, "Any individual involved with drug addiction will lie to his friends for the self-serving need. It's the cruelest truth of the situation. Kurt may fit this profile and he was surely in my mind as I wrote but the song is not a specific dedication to him". Other songs such as "Becuz" and "No Queen Blues" were built upon "numb grooves with slivers of melody, power, and gorgeously crafted noise". "The Diamond Sea" was described as a "Neil Young-esque ballad billowing into an epic noise excursion". Retrospectively, Pitchfork described it as "the most Sonic Youth song you can imagine".

== Artwork and release ==
The album cover consists of a cropped Polaroid photograph of two unidentified fans taken at a Sonic Youth show in Amherst, Massachusetts, in April 1995, during a short tour undertaken while the album was still in production. The fans are depicted wearing T-shirts that were sold as merchandise during that tour; early in 1995, the band considered changing their name to Washing Machine. Visible on the shirt on the left are signatures by Thalia Zedek and Chris Brokaw of the tour's opening band Come. The photo was taken by Gordon, who believed it could be used as the album cover. The band liked the shot, but the record label did not want to use it without permission from the fans. Because the band did not have any way to contact them, their faces had to be cropped out.

Washing Machine was released on vinyl, CD and cassette formats on September 26, 1995, by DGC, shortly after the group concluded their stint headlining the 1995 Lollapalooza music festival. During the festival, the band previewed some tracks from the album in addition to playing several songs from Daydream Nation, Dirty, and Experimental Jet Set. In Germany, the record was also released with a bonus disc containing four live songs that were recorded in Paris on September 12, 1995. Upon release, Washing Machine reached No. 58 on the US Billboard 200 chart and No. 39 on the UK Albums Chart. The album also charted in several other countries, including Australia, New Zealand, The Netherlands and Belgium. Two singles and music videos for "The Diamond Sea" and "Little Trouble Girl" were released in 1995 and 1996 respectively. As of 2005, the album had sold 159,000 copies in the US according to Nielsen SoundScan.

== Critical reception ==
Professional ratings
Review scores
Source	Rating
AllMusic	4/5 stars
Chicago Tribune	3.5/4 stars
Entertainment Weekly	A−
The Guardian	4/5 stars
Los Angeles Times	3/4 stars
NME	8/10
Pitchfork	8.5/10
Rolling Stone	4/5 stars
Spin	6/10
The Village Voice	A−

Washing Machine received generally positive reviews from music critics. Stephen Thomas Erlewine of AllMusic opined that the album was "easily [the band's] most adventurous, challenging and best record since Daydream Nation ... Not only are the songs more immediate than most of the material on their earlier records, the sound here is warm and open, making Washing Machine their most mature and welcoming record to date ... Washing Machine encompasses everything that made Sonic Youth innovators, and shows that they can continue to grow, finding new paths inside their signature sound". Similarly, Peter Margasak of CMJ New Music Monthly described the album as a "powerful consolidation of the band's accomplishments, but a distillation that looks forwards". He also highlighted the song "The Diamond Sea" as the album's centerpiece, stating that it was one of Moore's "most ambitious excursions into pure sonic colors, textures, and tension".

Writing for Rolling Stone, Tom Moon called Washing Machine "a sardonic, wise-ass, indulgent and totally captivating album", declaring that it was "anti-hook" and "disavows (and sometimes mocks) the conventional post-Nirvana wisdom". He highlighted Ranaldo and Moore's guitar interplay on every track, commenting that "they've developed an attack that is astonishingly intricate and jazzlike in its extreme flexibility". Prominent music critic Robert Christgau also praised the album and compared some songs favorably to the Grateful Dead and the Fleetwoods. Los Angeles Times writer Lorraine Ali stated that the album "finds Sonic Youth taking no radical new steps but instead holding onto its original groundbreaking formula and watching the big pop world come to it". In contrast, Entertainment Weekly's Browne felt that the band explored new challenges and wrote that Washing Machine was their "most audacious step yet".

In a mixed review, Spin editor Erik Davis criticized the album for its aimless structure, stating that each of the band's members "wanders off in a different direction", but highly praised "The Diamond Sea", calling it "a gorgeous tapestry buried in Washing Machine's uneven load". He added that the band "drifts into a beautiful ambient sea glittering with overtones. Then a metallic storm brews on the horizon, before a string of four riveting notes unleashes a festival of Hendrix necromancy ... It's easy to make guitar noise harsh and grating—but Sonic Youth can make it glow. It's easy to use noise as an orgasmic peak—but Sonic Youth can make it plateau, restraining their distortion only to intensify its monstrous serenity". He also said that the song showed that Sonic Youth "may get better the farther out they go", while NME magazine remarked that it was probably the band's best song. Washing Machine was ranked No. 18 in The Village Voice's 1995 Pazz & Jop critics' poll. Similarly, NME editors placed the album at No. 31 on their albums of the year list.

== Track listing ==
All tracks are written by Sonic Youth unless otherwise noted.

No.	Title	Vocals	Length
1.	"Becuz"	Gordon	4:43
2.	"Junkie's Promise"	Moore	4:02
3.	"Saucer-Like"	Ranaldo	4:25
4.	"Washing Machine"	Gordon	9:33
5.	"Unwind"	Moore	6:02
6.	"Little Trouble Girl"	Gordon, Kim Deal	4:29
7.	"No Queen Blues"	Moore	4:35
8.	"Panty Lies"	Gordon	4:15
9.	"Becuz Coda" (untitled on the packaging)		2:49
10.	"Skip Tracer" (additional lyrics by Leah Singer)	Ranaldo	3:48
11.	"The Diamond Sea"	Moore	19:35
Total length:			68:17

== Personnel ==
Credits are adapted from the album's liner notes.

Sonic Youth

- Thurston Moore – vocals, guitars; production
- Kim Gordon – vocals, guitars, bass guitar; production
- Lee Ranaldo – vocals, guitars; production
- Steve Shelley – drums; production

Additional musicians

- Kim Deal – additional vocals on "Little Trouble Girl"
- Lorette Velvette – additional vocals on "Little Trouble Girl"
- Melissa Dunn – additional vocals on "Little Trouble Girl"

Technical personnel

- John Siket – production, recording, mixing
- Davis McCain – engineering assistance
- Doug Easley – engineering assistance
- Phil Painson – engineering assistance
- Greg Calbi – mastering
- Mike Mills – art direction
- Lance Acord – photography

== Charts ==
Album

Chart (1995)	Peak
Australian Albums Chart	34
Belgian Albums Chart	38
Canada Top Albums/CDs (RPM)	48
Dutch Albums Chart	91
New Zealand Albums Chart	41
UK Albums Chart	39
US Billboard 200	58

Singles

Song	Chart (1996)	Peak
"Little Trouble Girl"	UK Singles Chart	81
