= Experimental Jet Set, Trash and No Star =

Studio album by Sonic Youth
- Released: May 10, 1994
- Recorded: Late 1993
- Studios: Sear Sound, New York City
- Genre: Noise rock
- Length: 50:10
- Label: DGC
- Producers: Butch Vig, Sonic Youth

Sonic Youth chronology
TV Shit (1993)	Experimental Jet Set, Trash and No Star (1994)	Made in USA (1995)

Sonic Youth studio album chronology
Dirty (1992)	Experimental Jet Set, Trash and No Star (1994)	Washing Machine (1995)

Singles from Experimental Jet Set, Trash and No Star
- 1. "Bull in the Heather" Released: April 19, 1994

Experimental Jet Set, Trash and No Star is the eighth studio album by American experimental rock band Sonic Youth, released on May 10, 1994, by DGC Records. It was produced by Butch Vig and recorded at Sear Sound studio in New York City, the same studio where the band's 1987 album Sister was recorded. Unlike its predecessor Dirty, Experimental Jet Set features a more low-key approach and references the band's earlier work on the independent record label SST Records. The album contains quieter and more relaxed songs that deal with personal and political topics.

Upon release, Experimental Jet Set reached No. 34 on the US Billboard Top 200 chart and No. 10 on the UK Albums Chart. It was the band's highest peak on the US charts until their 2009 album The Eternal reached No. 18. The song "Bull in the Heather" was released as a single and as a music video featuring Kathleen Hanna of Bikini Kill. The album received generally favorable reviews from music critics, who highlighted the band's ability to create both noise and melody. However, some felt that the album's anti-commercial style was difficult to appreciate.

== Background and recording ==
Experimental Jet Set, Trash and No Star is the follow-up to Sonic Youth's 1992 album Dirty, which was released by DGC in the wake of Nirvana's breakthrough into the mainstream. Dirty became one of the band's most commercially successful albums, selling around 500,000 copies worldwide as of May 1994. The album also reached No. 83 on the US Billboard Top 200 chart and No. 6 on the UK Albums Chart. After Dirty, Sonic Youth decided to step away from major-label alternative rock acts, which singer and guitarist Thurston Moore thought the media associated the band with. Touring with indie rock bands like Pavement, Sebadoh, and Royal Trux inspired Sonic Youth to write a quieter and more subtle album.

Like its predecessor, Experimental Jet Set was produced by the band and alternative rock veteran Butch Vig. According to the band, "The idea this time was to cut as much of it live as we could, and not labor over polishing and overdubbing in the usual big-rock manner." Similarly, guitarist Lee Ranaldo explained that the band wanted to achieve a more lo-fi approach: "None of [Experimental Jet set's] music was labored, some of it was done in people's bedrooms, even. [... We wanted] to write the songs and record them simply and basically." Additionally, the band ordered Vig to refrain from his desire to apply a buzz remover to several tracks. The album was engineered by John Siket and recorded at Sear Sound studio in New York City, the same studio where the band's 1987 album Sister was recorded. The band claimed that the album was recorded over the master tapes of Sister to save costs, and it is possible to hear some parts of Sister during quiet sections of the final recording. The album was recorded on a two-inch 16-track analog tape recorder through antiquated equipment.

== Music and lyrics ==
Unlike Dirty, which features a loud and "dense blast of noise", Experimental Jet Set was considered warmer and more relaxed. Singer and bassist Kim Gordon described the sound of the album as "art-core" and Bradley Bambarger of Billboard noted that the album references the band's earlier work on the independent record label SST Records, stating that it features "a sparse, bracingly dichotomous work of 'quiet noise' that, with its wayward tonalities and laconic grooves, speaks to the future while thinking of the past." In fact, the song "Screaming Skull" is about the band's nostalgia for their days on SST Records, which is mentioned frequently throughout the song. It also references fellow bands Hüsker Dü and The Lemonheads. The song was inspired by a conversation Moore had with film director Dave Markey about the SST Superstore, a shop located on Sunset Strip which supplies SST records and skateboard-related products.

Most of the lyrics on Experimental Jet Set deal with political and personal topics. Gordon explained that the song "Bull in the Heather" is about "using passiveness as a form of rebellion—like, I'm not going to participate in your male-dominated culture, so I'm just going to be passive." Similarly, the song "Androgynous Mind" addresses traditional gender roles, while "Self-Obsessed and Sexxee" is an observation on an anonymous riot grrrl. Moore explained that the latter is not about Courtney Love of Hole or Kathleen Hanna of Bikini Kill; it is about "being attracted to somebody who's obviously out of control with self-obsession in the high-profile alternative-rock world." The track "Quest for the Cup" deals with a person who desires more than it is needed. The opening track, "Winner's Blues", alludes to the pressure of fame and has been described as an acoustic and sad lullaby. The song was originally intended to be an outtake designated for the compilation DGC Rarities Vol. 1, but the band ultimately decided to include it in the album at the last minute during the mixing sessions. Another outtake, "Compilation Blues", was instead included on the compilation.

Experimental Jet Set was also the first Sonic Youth album to feature a hidden track on the CD release; just over a minute after the closing track "Sweet Shine" finishes, there is 1:30 of "bonus noise" featuring a looped speech of a Japanese gas attendant. Unlike on previous Sonic Youth albums, Ranaldo did not write or sing any songs because he did not like how his compositions were treated and assembled for Dirty and its predecessor Goo. David Browne, author of Goodbye 20th Century: A Biography of Sonic Youth, remarked that "a sense of ambivalence and impermanence hung over [Experimental Jet Set], even down to the cover", which "for the first time since Sonic Youth in 1982, featured their faces instead of a piece of art."

== Promotion and release ==
To promote the album, the song "Bull in the Heather" was released as a single in April 1994. The single features an outtake, "Razor Blade", which was recorded at the same sessions as "Winner's Blues" and "Compilation Blues", and an alternate version of "Doctor's Orders" as B-sides. The song reached No. 13 on the US Modern Rock Tracks and No. 24 on the UK Singles Chart. The track "Self-Obsessed and Sexxee" was intended to be the second single from the album. A promo CD was issued, but plans for a regular release were eventually canceled. The remaining copies were sold off through the Sonic Death fan club magazine. The CD includes the same B-sides as "Bull in the Heather". A music video featuring Kathleen Hanna was made for "Bull in the Heather" under the direction of Tamra Davis.

Experimental Jet Set, Trash and No Star was released on May 10, 1994, by DGC, which also released the band's previous two albums. The album peaked at No. 34 on the US Billboard Top 200 chart and No. 10 on the UK Albums Chart. It was the band's highest position on the US charts until their 2009 album The Eternal reached No. 18. The album also charted in several other countries, including Australia, New Zealand, The Netherlands and Sweden. The band did not support the album with a tour due to Gordon's advanced pregnancy at the time. As of 2005, the album had sold 246,000 copies in the US according to Nielsen SoundScan.

== Critical reception ==
Professional ratings
Review scores
Source	Rating
AllMusic	3/5 stars
Blender	3/5 stars
Chicago Tribune	3.5/4 stars
Christgau's Consumer Guide	A
Entertainment Weekly	B
Los Angeles Times	3.5/4 stars
Pitchfork	6.8/10
Rolling Stone	4/5 stars
The Rolling Stone Album Guide	3/5 stars
The Village Voice	A−

Experimental Jet Set, Trash and No Star received generally favorable reviews from music critics. Barbara O'Dair of Rolling Stone felt that the album was "quietly confident; more ambitious and weirder than Dirty". However, she remarked that the band "saved their integrity at the expense of quality; with a little more grease, their grit might get across better." Lorraine Ali, writing for the Los Angeles Times, praised Gordon's dynamic singing and the guitar playing for giving the album a sleepy and dreamy mood, concluding that Sonic Youth "transcends the confining roles of pretentious art-rock band or palatable alternative group, and instead offers a penetrating album that's all its own." Billboard also praised the album, saying that it offered both noise and melody that "cohabitate exceedingly well".

In a mixed review, AllMusic reviewer Jason Birchmeier criticized Experimental Jet Set for its stripped-down sound, saying that the album only contains "odd lyrics and unique guitar nuance." Similarly, Evelyn McDonnell of Entertainment Weekly noted that the songs "never quite emerge from the sketch stage" and that newcomers may find it difficult to appreciate. In contrast, Alternative Press highlighted the album's anti-commercial aesthetic, claiming that "It doesn't get much cooler than this". The Advocate criticized the album and the band for not taking risks, concluding: "Sonic Youth is stuck repeating the same experience. And this time around, the songs don't stick." Mike Rubin, writing for Spin, described Experimental Jet Set as a "low-key, mellow affair", but highlighted the guitar playing and the audio feedback on some songs.

In a positive review for The Village Voice, Robert Christgau highlighted the band's ability to create unexpected noises, which he described as "marks of flesh-and-blood creatures thinking and feeling things neither you nor they have ever thought or felt before. If they can't quite put those things into words, that's what unexpected noises are for." Unlike previous Sonic Youth albums, Experimental Jet Set was not ranked in the Top 40 of The Village Voice's Pazz & Jop critics' poll for 1994, but Christgau placed it at No. 3 in his own "Dean's List". In a retrospective review for About.com, 90s rock expert Melissa Bobbitt wrote: "Though it might not be as universally celebrated as 1988's Daydream Nation or Dirty, this record represented the triumphant rise of the Alternative Nation and its progressive nature." In 2014, Guitar World placed Experimental Jet Set, Trash and No Star at No. 44 in their "Superunknown: 50 Iconic Albums That Defined 1994" list.

== Track listing ==
All tracks are written by Sonic Youth unless otherwise noted.

No.	Title	Vocals	Length
1.	"Winner's Blues"	Moore	2:07
2.	"Bull in the Heather"	Gordon	3:04
3.	"Starfield Road"	Moore	2:15
4.	"Skink"	Gordon	4:12
5.	"Screaming Skull" (additional lyrics by Dave Markey)	Moore	2:38
6.	"Self-Obsessed and Sexxee"	Moore	4:30
7.	"Bone"	Gordon	3:57
8.	"Androgynous Mind"	Moore	3:30
9.	"Quest for the Cup"	Gordon	2:30
10.	"Waist"	Moore	2:49
11.	"Doctor's Orders"	Gordon	4:20
12.	"Tokyo Eye"	Moore	3:55
13.	"In the Mind of the Bourgeois Reader"	Moore	2:33
14.	"Sweet Shine" (contains hidden track of "bonus noise" at 6:25)	Gordon	7:50
Total length:			50:10

== Personnel ==
Credits are adapted from the album's liner notes.

Sonic Youth

- Thurston Moore – vocals, guitar
- Kim Gordon – vocals, bass
- Lee Ranaldo – guitar
- Steve Shelley – drums, percussion

Design

- Kevin Reagan – sleeve design
- Catherine Lewis – sleeve photography
- Stefano Giovannini – sleeve photography

Technical

- Butch Vig – recording, mixing, production
- John Siket – engineering
- Howie Weinberg – mastering
- Bil Emmons – technician
- Devin Emke – technician
- Ed Raso – technician
- Fred Kevorkian – technician
- Ollie Cotton – technician
- Walter Sear – technician

== Charts ==
Album

Chart performance for Experimental Jet Set, Trash and No Star
Chart (1994)	Peak position
Australian Albums (ARIA)	25
Canada Top Albums/CDs (RPM)	34
Dutch Albums (Album Top 100)	65
European Albums (Eurotipsheet)	38
German Albums (Offizielle Top 100)	87
New Zealand Albums (RMNZ)	16
Portuguese Albums Chart (Music & Media)	8
Scottish Albums (Official Charts)	56
Swedish Albums (Sverigetopplistan)	27
UK Albums (Official Charts)	10
US Billboard 200	34

Singles

Song	Chart (1994)	Peak
"Bull in the Heather"	UK Singles Chart	24
"Bull in the Heather"	US Modern Rock Tracks	13
