= Made in U.S.A. (1987 film) =

- Theatrical release poster
- Directed by: Ken Friedman
- Written by: Zbigniew Kempinski (story); Nick Wechsler (story)
- Screenplay by: Zbigniew Kempinski
- Produced by: Mark Allan; Charles Roven
- Starring: Adrian Pasdar; Chris Penn; Lori Singer
- Cinematography: Curtis Clark
- Edited by: Curtiss Clayton
- Music by: Sonic Youth
- Production companies: De Laurentiis Entertainment Group; Hemdale Film Corporation
- Distributed by: Tri-Star Pictures
- Release dates: May 15, 1987 (Cannes Film Festival); March 11, 1988 (United States)
- Running time: 82 min.
- Country: United States
- Language: English

Made in U.S.A. is a 1987 American crime drama / black comedy film directed by Ken Friedman from a screenplay by Zbigniew Kempinski.

== Plot ==
The film stars Adrian Pasdar and Chris Penn as two young men who decide to leave behind their working-class lives in the coal-mining country of Pennsylvania and travel to California. Along the way, they pick up a hitchhiker (Lori Singer) and embark on a crime spree. The leitmotiv of the film involves Tuck and Dar ending up in different locations across the United States destroyed by man made environmental disasters. Starting in their dying hometown of Centralia, Pennsylvania and traveling to other towns including the ghost town of Times Beach, Missouri and Church Rock, New Mexico.

== Cast ==
- Adrian Pasdar as Dar
- Chris Penn as Tuck
- Lori Singer as Annie
- Marji Martin as Ma Frazier
- Tiny Wells as Pa Frazier
- Judith Baldwin as Dorie
- Jacqueline Murphy as Cora
- Frank Beddor as Bud
- Dean Paul Martin as Cowboy
- Katherine Kelly Lang as Kelly

== Soundtrack ==
The soundtrack features songs and score by the American band Sonic Youth, who in 1995 released an album (also titled Made in USA) of music they had recorded for the film. In 2016 the band released "Spinhead Sessions" with extended versions of the cues they'd created for the film.

== Versions of the film released by rival creators ==
The release of the film was delayed because of a dispute over artistic control between Friedman and John Daly of Hemdale Films. Friedman first showed his version, without the permission of Hemdale, who held the copyright, at the 1987 Cannes Film Festival. Daly released the studio's version to video in 1989.

== Trademark dispute over the film's title ==
The film was originally entitled USA Today, but the publishers of the USA Today newspaper, Gannett Company sued the film's producers, Hemdale Film Corporation, for the use of the name for one of the company's features. As a condition of the settlement, Hemdale decided to rename the title to Made in U.S.A., according to documents filed in federal court.
