= Screaming Fields of Sonic Love =

Compilation album by Sonic Youth
- Released: April 25, 1995
- Recorded: 1982–1988
- Genre: Alternative rock; noise rock; experimental rock
- Length: 76:19
- Label: DGC
- Producer: Sonic Youth

Sonic Youth compilation album chronology
Screaming Fields of Sonic Love (1995)	The Destroyed Room: B-Sides and Rarities (2006)

Sonic Youth chronology
Made in USA (1995)	Screaming Fields of Sonic Love (1995)	Washing Machine (1995)

Professional ratings
Review scores
Source	Rating
AllMusic	3/5 stars
Robert Christgau	A−
Q	4/5 stars
The Rolling Stone Album Guide	4/5 stars

Screaming Fields of Sonic Love is a compilation album of songs culled from Sonic Youth's various releases from the 1980s. It was released in 1995 on DGC.

== Background ==
The tracks feature samples from each of the group's major '80s albums. However, they run in reverse chronological order, starting with songs from the band's 1988 masterwork Daydream Nation, and ending with a track from their eponymous first album from 1982. The release of this compilation coincided with the release of a music video collection of the same name, featuring all of Sonic Youth's music videos from the 1980s.

== Track listing ==
1. "Teen Age Riot" – 6:58
2. "Eric's Trip" – 3:49
3. "Candle" – 4:59
4. "Into the Groove(y)" – 4:35
5. "G-Force" – 3:40
6. "Beauty Lies in the Eye" – 2:17
7. "Kotton Krown" – 5:08
8. "Shadow of a Doubt" – 3:34
9. "Expressway to Yr. Skull" – 7:08
10. "Starpower" – 4:49
11. "Death Valley '69" – 5:10
12. "Halloween" – 5:09
13. "Flower" – 3:36
14. "Inhuman" – 4:01
15. "Making the Nature Scene" – 3:00
16. "Brother James" – 3:12
17. "I Dreamed I Dream" – 5:19

== VHS ==
1. "Inhuman" (excerpt, live in front of The Zap, Brighton, 8 November 1985) [unlisted]
2. "Death Valley '69" (feat. Lydia Lunch, dir. Richard Kern)
3. "Shadow of a Doubt" (dir. Kevin Kerslake)
4. "Beauty Lies in the Eye" (dir. Kevin Kerslake)
5. Ciccone Youth "Addicted to Love" (dir. Kim Gordon)
6. Ciccone Youth "Macbeth" (dir. Dave Markey)
7. "Teen Age Riot" (dir. Sonic Youth)
8. "Silver Rocket" (dir. Charles Atlas)
9. "Providence" (dir. Peter Fowler & Sonic Youth)
10. "Candle" (dir. Kevin Kerslake)
11. "Silver Rocket" (feat. Don Fleming, live on Night Music, episode 210, 1989) (dir. John Fortenberry)
12. "I Wanna Be Your Dog" (feat. David Sanborn & Indigo Girls, live on Night Music, episode 210, 1989) (dir. John Fortenberry)
13. "Schizophrenia" (live at The Town and Country Club, London, 4 June 1987)
14. "I Wanna Be Your Dog" (feat. Iggy Pop, live at The Town and Country Club, London, 4 June 1987)
15. Thurston Moore's nephew John and his three sisters "My Friend Goo" (Hyper version) (dir. Thurston Moore) [unlisted]
16. Thurston's nephew John and his three sisters "My Friend Goo" (Bored version) (dir. Thurston Moore) [unlisted]
17. "Brother James (live at The Zap, Brighton, 8 November 1985) [unlisted]
