= Live in Brooklyn 2011 =

Live album by Sonic Youth
- Released: August 18, 2023
- Recorded: August 12, 2011
- Venue: A stage on the East River at the Williamsburg Waterfront, Brooklyn, New York City, New York, US
- Genre: Indie rock
- Length: 84:59
- Language: English
- Label: Goofin' and Silver Current Records

Sonic Youth chronology
Live in Kyiv, 1989 (2022)	Live in Brooklyn 2011 (2023)

Live in Brooklyn 2011 is a 2023 live album by American indie rock band Sonic Youth. The album documents the band's final performance in the United States and is a remixed and remastered release of the 2018 album Brooklyn, NY • Williamsburg Waterfront • August 12, 2011.

== Background ==
Drummer Steve Shelley on the performance captured on this album:

This show was a culmination of a run of really special outdoor summertime shows in New York City for us, starting in ’92 with SummerStage in Central Park when we played with Sun Ra. For the Williamsburg Waterfront show I wrote out the set list to present to the band and it was a lot of material we hadn’t played in a while, a lot of deep cuts, so I wasn’t sure if everybody would feel like doing it. After worrying about which songs the band might say yes or no to, I threw those concerns out the window and I just made a list of songs that I thought would be a great set. We practiced the week of the show at our space in Hoboken and put the set together. First we’d try and make sure we had a guitar in the song’s tuning, then we’d try to remember the arrangement and try and put it together, sometimes re-learning bar by bar. In the end I think the whole song list made it through. Even as early as ’86 and ’87 we stopped playing ‘Death Valley 69’ and ‘Brave Men Run’ with any regularity. We’d just get excited about new material coming into the set and songs would get ‘retired’ and wouldn’t get played again for years. So on this particular night in Brooklyn a lot of those retired songs and deep cuts got dusted off and played for this show. It turned out to be a pretty special event with a really special song list.

== Reception ==
According to the review aggregator Metacritic, Live in Brooklyn 2011 received "universal acclaim" based on a weighted average score of 87 out of 100 from seven critic scores. Editors at AllMusic rated this album 4.5 out of 5 stars, with critic Heather Phares writing that the band's "chemistry on Live in Brooklyn 2011 is as electrifying as ever" and "on every song, there's a fire and liberation in Sonic Youth's playing that shows, despite the tension within the band at the time, they could still come together to make thrilling music". Editors at Pitchfork chose this as a Best New Reissue, with critic Stuart Berman rating it an 8.3 out of 10, calling it a "pivotal live album captures a peerless set from a band who knew its days were numbered" and "a holistic 17-track noise opera that enshrines Sonic Youth’s greatest attributes and contradictions".

Carl Wilson included this in a list of 24 runners-up for the best albums of 2023 in Slate.

== Track listing ==
1. "Brave Men Run (In My Family)" – 5:12
2. "Death Valley ’69" – 5:51
3. "Kotton Krown" – 5:07
4. "Kill Yr Idols" – 2:56
5. "Eric’s Trip" – 3:45
6. "Sacred Trickster" – 2:11
7. "Calming the Snake" – 3:51
8. "Starfield Road" – 3:27
9. "I Love Her All the Time" – 7:15
10. "Ghost Bitch" – 4:18
11. "Tom Violence" – 3:11
12. "What We Know" – 4:54
13. "Drunken Butterfly" – 4:23
14. "Flower" – 4:27
15. "Sugar Kane" – 7:42
16. "Psychic Hearts" – 4:31
17. "Inhuman" – 11:59

== Personnel ==
Sonic Youth

- Kim Gordon – guitar, vocals
- Mark Ibold – bass guitar
- Thurston Moore – guitar, vocals
- Lee Ranaldo – guitar, vocals
- Steve Shelley – drums

Additional personnel

- Eric Baecht – photography
- Ethan Miller – layout, design
- Aaron Mullan – recording, mixing
- Carl Saff – mastering

== See also ==
- 2023 in American music
- List of 2023 albums
