= Goo (album) =

Studio album by Sonic Youth
- Released: June 26, 1990
- Recorded: March–April 1990
- Studios: Sorcerer Sound Recording Studios and Greene St. Recording, New York City
- Genres: Alternative rock; noise rock; punk rock; art punk
- Length: 49:23
- Label: DGC
- Producers: Nick Sansano; Ron Saint Germain; Sonic Youth

Sonic Youth chronology
The Whitey Album (1989)	Goo (1990)	Dirty (1992)

Singles from Goo
- 1. "Kool Thing" Released: June 1990; 2. "Disappearer" Released: 1990; 3. "Dirty Boots" Released: April 1991

Goo is the sixth full-length studio album by American alternative rock band Sonic Youth, released on June 26, 1990, by DGC Records. The album was the band's major label debut, originally signing with Geffen Records before they were given to DGC, a smaller subsidiary of the label. Coming off the success of Daydream Nation, Nick Sansano returned to engineer Goo, but veteran producer Ron Saint Germain was chosen by Sonic Youth to finish mixing the album following Sansano's dismissal.

Featuring feminist and pop culture-concerned lyrics, the band sought to expand upon its trademark alternating guitar arrangements and the layered sound of their previous album Daydream Nation, with bassist Kim Gordon's role as a vocalist and songwriter expanding in relation to previous albums.

Goo was a critical and commercial success upon its release, peaking at number 96 on the US Billboard 200, their highest chart position to date. Although it lacked significant radio airplay, its lead single "Kool Thing", a collaborative effort with Public Enemy's Chuck D, reached number seven on the Billboard Modern Rock Tracks chart. Since then, Goo has been viewed as one of alternative rock's most important albums, and is considered musically and artistically significant. In 2020, the album was ranked at number 358 on Rolling Stone's 500 greatest albums of all time list.

== Background ==
In 1989, nearly a year after the release of the band's breakthrough album Daydream Nation, Sonic Youth announced that it had signed a recording contract with Geffen Records, the group's first major label deal. Sonic Youth decided to sever relations with its former label, Enigma Records, as a result of the band's displeasure with Enigma's indecisive marketing and distribution of Daydream Nation, as well as "Teen Age Riot"—‌the album's accompanying single. Another factor that contributed to the group's departure from the label was Enigma's handling of The Whitey Album, an experimental album of sound manipulation and hip-hop influences released under the name Ciccone Youth. Not only did Enigma reject the band's proposal to simultaneously release the album with Daydream Nation, the label's publicity branch also attempted to withdraw its cover art—an enlarged photo of Madonna's face—even though Madonna reportedly gave Sonic Youth her permission to use it.

By mid-1989, Sonic Youth's relationship with its British and American label head Paul Smith, who the band's legal counsel, Richard Grebal, termed "a trusted advisor but never a manager", was growing increasingly strained. Tensions between Smith and the group had begun in 1986 when Smith arranged the release of live recordings by the band on the album Walls Have Ears without their input. Mindful about their work and image, Sonic Youth was irritated by the decision, especially when the album was distributed before EVOL. The situation was compounded further when Smith took a bold negotiating stance with major record labels during the Daydream Nation tour and took long intervals to communicate information to the band. His stance, which had the potential to scare away record executives, represented the final straw for the band. On June 2, 1989, Sonic Youth went to Smith's apartment, ostensibly to discuss another music video for Daydream Nation, to announce an end to their partnership.

Having entertained offers from A&M Records, Atlantic Records, and Mute Records, Sonic Youth signed a five-album deal worth $300,000 with a clause which secured the band's complete control of its creative output. The group, however, was somewhat dissatisfied that the album would not be released by Geffen but rather a new and unestablished subsidiary label, DGC Records.

== Recording ==
In November 1989, Sonic Youth, accompanied by producers Don Fleming and J Mascis, recorded demos of eight songs at the Waterworks, a studio run by Jim Waters in the meat-packing district of New York City. Lee Ranaldo recalled Kim Gordon and Thurston Moore were keen on inviting Fleming and Mascis "both as extended family and as people to have an opinion"; both Ranaldo and Steve Shelley were uncomfortable about their presence "because we'd never made records before where there were other people involved". The original working title for the album was Blowjob?, mostly to test the humor of their new label, but ultimately the band was convinced to drop the name in favor of Goo, a title inspired by one of the album's tracks, "My Friend Goo". Because the results of these sessions were later heavily bootlegged, Moore officially released them on the album Goo Demos in 1991.

At engineer Nick Sansano's recommendation, with a sizable budget finally at their disposal, Sonic Youth booked themselves into Sorcerer Sound in early 1990. Sansano knew well from his work on Daydream Nation that the band, particularly Ranaldo, enjoyed overdubbing sound and guitar effects. At Sorcerer Sound, the studio was equipped with two 24-track consoles, allowing the group as many instrumentals as they desired. Sonic Youth used the studio time to experiment with abstract techniques such as hanging microphones from the Sorcerer Sound's catwalk and isolating Shelley in a drum booth. Early on, however, the band was bogged down by issues: "It took us forever to get final takes", said Ranaldo, "Something would inevitably go wrong for somebody and we'd have to start again. I remember getting fairly frustrated with it".

After the basic tracks were completed, Sonic Youth moved to Greene St. Recording, Sansano's home base, to finalize the songs and begin the process of mixing Goo. Additional layers of guitar lines were included; vocals were manipulated with different distortion devices, particularly on "Mary-Christ". Also in the studio again were Mascis and Fleming to serve as consultants, Mascis for the album's vocal parts and Fleming for the percussion sounds. Fleming felt Gordon's vocals, with her unconventional timbre, were a particular pleasure to record, noting her eagerness to attempt different approaches with her delivery during the sessions. Sansano, however, was unsure of the album's direction: Each member of Sonic Youth brought their philosophy to arranging the music that conflicted with the label owner's expectations for a radio-friendly album.

While recording Goo, Moore played the Nirvana album Bleach for Masterdisk audio engineer Howie Weinberg saying that he would be very happy if the record sounded like Bleach. Weinberg was surprised by the request to emulate a recording as primitive as Bleach (which was recorded on a $600 budget). Moore has said that he "really love[s] that record", describing it as "primal" and the songwriting as "completely melodious" but also "punk".

Although Gary Gersh, one of Geffen's managers, denies that Geffen placed any pressures on Sonic Youth to produce a commercial album, upon listening to the first mixes from the sessions, both Gersh and the band were concerned about Sansano's abilities to finish Goo and insisted on hiring a veteran producer—the group chose jazz musician-turned-producer Ron Saint Germain—to arrange the final mixes. Sansano voluntarily left the project but was so dejected by the group's lack of faith that he refused to speak to them years afterwards. With Germain, the band gave him relatively free rein to sort through the countless overdubs that Sonic Youth had worked on before his entry into the project. He already had an extensive resume, including his work in the jazz community and Bad Brains' highly-influential album I Against I. By the time Goo was complete, its costs rose to $150,000 (US), five times as much as Daydream Nation. The figure was staggering for a cost-conscious band; according to Shelley, Sonic Youth would have been better served releasing the original Goo demos to reduce the final costs.

== Music ==
Goo expanded upon the alt-rock stylings of Daydream Nation with far more deliberate pop culture references. Another development within the band at the time was Gordon's importance as both a lead vocalist and songwriter. Gordon contributed two songs, "Tunic (Song for Karen)" and "Kool Thing", that challenged the expectations of a woman's role in American society. "Tunic (Song for Karen)", an exploration into self-esteem and body image, traces Karen Carpenter's struggle with anorexia nervosa to her mother's comment that she appeared overweight onstage, and the music industry's rejection of her proposed 1980 solo album. Band biographer Stevie Chick described Gordon's lyrics as "coloured by a suffocating almost gothic sadness" and "melancholy perhaps similar to that which underscores the Carpenters own music".

A second Gordon composition, "Kool Thing", was inspired by her 1989 interview with LL Cool J. Although Gordon was a long-time fan of the hip hop artist and credited his album Radio with drawing her to rap, LL Cool J's inattention to punk music and misogynistic viewpoints towards women disenchanted Gordon. In her anthology book Here She Comes Now: Women in Music Who Have Changed Our Lives, Elissa Schnappel wrote that Gordon "transformed the experience into a sharp and witty social critique of gender, race and power that you could dance to." Gordon's tongue-in-cheek response to the meeting, "Kool Thing", poked fun at her own left-wing political beliefs as well as her fascination with the Black Panther Party. Although LL Cool J himself is not mentioned in the song, his works "I Can't Live Without My Radio", "Going Back to Cali" and Walking with a Panther were referenced. Chuck D of Public Enemy, who was at Greene Street to record Fear of a Black Planet, contributed to the call-and-response middle section.

The production's musique concrète-influenced approach reflected Sonic Youth's inclination to record sound collages that feature varying rhythms and overdubbing. "Mildred Pierce" and "Scooter + Jinx" were worked out from methods that involved the band members reconfiguring and recontextualizing different types of sound in the studio. Deriving from the eight-minute demo "Blowjob", the angst-driven "Mildred Pierce" was inspired by the 1945 noir film of the same name. Alec Foerge observed the song as "the band's reaction against what had become a frustratingly overwrought process", featuring nothing more than a three-chord vamp and Moore repeatedly shouting "Mildred Pierce"; still, as Foerge described, it is an example of Sonic Youth's progression from the primitive nature of Confusion Is Sex and Kill Yr Idols. At one point in the recording sessions, Moore's amplifier overheated and exploded, emitting a high screeching sound. The band, nonetheless fascinated by the results, reappropriated the sound for all of "Scooter + Jinx".

== Release ==
Goo was released by DGC Records on June 26, 1990. The album's front cover design was created by Raymond Pettibon, who was responsible for early covers for Black Flag. Instead of his original Joan Crawford sketch, Sonic Youth chose another Pettibon design: an illustration of two sunglasses-wearing British mods, based on a photograph of Maureen Hindley and David Smith, two witnesses in the Moors murders trial. Although Geffen pushed for a mainstream market, the label also was concerned about alienating Sonic Youth's original fan base. This prompted Geffen executive Mark Kates to attempt grassroots promotional tactics. In promoting Goo, Kates arranged for the band to visit college radio stations and music journalists weeks leading up to the album's release.

The controversy surrounding the album's content and the exposure from the single "Kool Thing" helped Goo exceed the expectations of the group's label. By December 1990, Goo had sold over 200,000 copies and ultimately peaked at No. 96 on the Billboard 200—the band's highest charting album to date. Although it was difficult for Geffen to transition Sonic Youth over to pop radio, "Kool Thing" made it onto Buzz Bin's regular rotation schedule, and became their most popular song on alternative radio, reaching No. 7 on the Billboard Modern Rock Tracks. The album contributed to alternative music's commercial breakthrough at the beginning of the 1990s, despite its limited radio airplay.

== Reception ==
Professional ratings
Review scores
Source	Rating
AllMusic	4/5 stars
Blender	5/5 stars
Christgau's Consumer Guide	A−
Entertainment Weekly	B
Los Angeles Times	4/5 stars
NME	9/10
Pitchfork	8.5/10
Record Collector	4/5 stars
Rolling Stone	4/5 stars
Select	4/5

Goo received rave reviews from contemporary critics. In an August 1990 article, Rolling Stone's David Fricke viewed the record as Sonic Youth's most accessible work to date. He believed Goo was a "brilliant, extended essay in refined primitivism that deftly reconciles rock's structural conventions with the band's twin passions for violent tonal elasticity and garage-punk holocaust". Jonathan Gold of the Los Angeles Times hailed Sonic Youth as the "Rolling Stones of noise music" and found the band's distorted guitars, danceable rhythms and catchy choruses fit for radio airplay. Select writer Russell Brown felt that the album "bursts with ... a sense of the unexpected" and praised it as "bitchin' good art". In NME, Steve Lamacq concluded that while it "might not be the hippest album, taking into account public taste for US grunge at the moment", Goo "is still a defiant alternative".

== Legacy ==
Since Goo was first released, it has been viewed as one of the greatest and most important alternative rock records of all time, as well as a culturally significant work. Alec Foerge cited it as "radical—even defiant by 1990 major label standards" while David Browne said the album's success was "an indication that an audience for this music was coalescing, albeit slowly". Daisy Jones of Dazed found the album powerfully relevant to American youth: "It sprung out of 1990, the year in which grunge had spread like an itch amongst a generation increasingly disillusioned with the mock-metal and stadium theatrics of artists like Guns N' Roses and Alice Cooper". Writing for Tidal, Jakob Matzen said that because Goo was Sonic Youth's most approachable album, it is a "crucial piece of the puzzle to understand how and why other alternative artists (like Nirvana) were able to bring the underground to the mainstream and challenge the dominant music industry hegemony".

In 2014, music journalist Andrew Earles wrote that "What makes Goo an undeniable winner is Sonic Youth's increased focus on songcraft", going on to say the album contains some of the best material of the band's career.

In 2020, Paste named Goo the 3rd best album of 1990. Staff writer Jonah Flicker wrote: "Sonic Youth’s Goo came at just the right time—the ’90s had arrived, and “alternative rock” and grunge were hitting it big. [...] Goo also marked the beginning of a long relationship with Geffen Records, bringing truly experimental rock to the mainstream."

== Track listing ==
All tracks are written by Sonic Youth (Thurston Moore, Kim Gordon, Lee Ranaldo, Steve Shelley).

No.	Title	Vocalist	Length
1.	"Dirty Boots"	Moore	5:29
2.	"Tunic (Song for Karen)"	Gordon	6:21
3.	"Mary-Christ"	Moore, Gordon	3:11
4.	"Kool Thing"	Gordon, Chuck D	4:06
5.	"Mote"	Ranaldo	7:37
6.	"My Friend Goo"	Gordon, Moore	2:20
7.	"Disappearer"	Moore	5:08
8.	"Mildred Pierce"	Moore	2:13
9.	"Cinderella's Big Score"	Gordon	5:54
10.	"Scooter + Jinx"	—	1:05
11.	"Titanium Exposé"	Moore, Gordon	6:26

Japanese edition bonus tracks
No.	Title	Vocalist	Length
12.	"White Kross" (live)	—	5:07
13.	"Eric's Trip" (live)	—	3:32
14.	"Cinderella's Big Score" (live)	—	6:35
15.	"The Bedroom" (live)	—	3:40

Deluxe edition disc 1 bonus tracks
No.	Title	Writer(s)	Vocalist	Length
12.	"Lee No. 2" (previously unreleased)		Ranaldo	3:31
13.	"That's All I Know (Right Now)" (Neon Boys cover)	Richard Hell, Tom Verlaine	Moore	2:20
14.	"The Bedroom" (live)		—	3:42
15.	"Dr. Benway's House"		—	1:17
16.	"Tuff Boyz" (previously unreleased)		—	5:39

Deluxe edition disc 2
No.	Title	Writer(s)	Vocalist	Length
1.	"Tunic" (8-track demo)		Gordon, Mascis	6:44
2.	"Number One (Disappearer)" (8-track demo)		Moore	4:57
3.	"Titanium Exposé" (8-track demo)		Moore, Gordon	4:43
4.	"Dirty Boots" (8-track demo)		Moore	6:37
5.	"Corky (Cinderella's Big Score)" (8-track demo)		Moore	7:49
6.	"My Friend Goo" (8-track demo)		Gordon	2:31
7.	"Bookstore (Mote)" (8-track demo)		Ranaldo	4:14
8.	"Animals (Mary-Christ)" (8-track demo)		Moore, Gordon	3:02
9.	"DV2 (Kool Thing)" (8-track demo)		Gordon, Moore	4:17
10.	"Blowjob (Mildred Pierce)" (8-track demo)		Moore	8:52
11.	"Lee No. 2 (instrumental)" (8-track demo)		—	3:30
12.	"I Know There's an Answer" (Beach Boys cover)	Brian Wilson, Mike Love, Terry Sachen	Ranaldo, Moore	3:10
13.	"Can Song" (previously unreleased)		—	3:17
14.	"Isaac" (previously unreleased)		—	2:36
15.	"Goo Interview Flexi" (sound montage (previously unreleased))		—	6:03

== Personnel ==
Credits are adapted from the liner notes of Goo.

Sonic Youth

- Thurston Moore – vocals, guitar, production, bass (track 6)
- Lee Ranaldo – guitar, vocals, production
- Kim Gordon – vocals, bass guitar, production
- Steve Shelley – drums, percussion, production

Guest musicians

- J Mascis – backing vocals (tracks 2, 5 and 6), additional production
- Don Fleming – backing vocals (tracks 1 and 7), additional production, additional percussion
- Chuck D – additional vocals (track 4)

Design

- Kevin Reagan – art direction
- Suzanne Sasic – artwork
- Raymond Pettibon – cover illustration
- Michael Lavine – sleeve photography

Technical

- Nick Sansano – production, recording, additional percussion
- Ron Saint Germain – production, engineering, mixing
- Nick Sansano – additional engineering
- Dan Wood – assistant engineering
- John Herman – assistant engineering
- Judy Kirschner – assistant engineering
- Howie Weinberg – mastering
- Jim Waters – additional recording (track 8)

== Chart positions ==
Weekly chart performance for Goo
Chart (1990)	Peak position
Dutch Albums (Album Top 100)	71
New Zealand Albums (RMNZ)	22
UK Albums (OCC)	32
US Billboard 200	96

=== Singles ===
Year	Single	Peak positions		
Year	Single	US ALT	UK	IRL
1990	"Kool Thing"	7	81	24

== Certifications ==
Region	Certification	Certified units/sales
United Kingdom (BPI)	Silver	60,000^{‡}
^{‡} Sales+streaming figures based on certification alone.
