= Made in USA (Sonic Youth album) =

1995 soundtrack album by Sonic Youth

Soundtrack album by Sonic Youth
- Released: January 24, 1995
- Recorded: September – October 1986
- Genre: Alternative rock; experimental rock
- Length: 42:17
- Label: Rhino
- Producer: Sonic Youth

Sonic Youth chronology
Experimental Jet Set, Trash and No Star (1994)	Made in USA (1995)	Screaming Fields of Sonic Love (1995)

Professional ratings
Review scores
Source	Rating
AllMusic	2/5 stars
Blender	1/5 stars

Made in USA is an album by Sonic Youth, containing music the band scored for the 1987 film of the same name. The band recorded this material in 1986, shortly after the completion of their album EVOL, but the album was not released until 1995. A soundtrack for the film was also released in 1987, but unlike this release, did not contain any of the original score the band created for the film. Rehearsal demos for these sessions were released in 2016, as Spinhead Sessions • 1986,

== Track listing ==
1. "Mackin' for Doober" – 0:51
2. "Full Chrome Logic" – 0:59
3. "Secret Girl" – 2:55
4. "Cork Mountain Incident" – 0:49
5. "Moustache Riders" – 1:07
6. "Tuck N Dar" – 3:40
7. "Moon in the Bathroom" – 2:29
8. "Thought Bubbles" – 2:25
9. "Rim Thrusters" – 1:59
10. "Lincoln's Gout" – 2:08
11. "Coughing Up Tweed" – 1:17
12. "Pre-Poured Wood" – 0:52
13. "Hairpiece Lullaby 1 & 2" – 2:08
14. "Pocketful of Sen-Sen" – 1:15
15. "Smoke Blisters 1 & 2" – 2:33
16. "The Velvet Plug" – 2:31
17. "Giggles" – 0:53
18. "Tulip Fire 2" – 1:56
19. "The Dynamics of Bulbing" – 1:17
20. "Smoke Blisters 3 & 4" – 3:20
21. "O.J.'s Glove or What?" – 1:20
22. "Webb of Mud 1, 2 & 3" – 2:51
23. "Bachelors in Fur!" – 1:00

== Spinhead Sessions - 1986 ==
Spinhead Sessions - 1986

Soundtrack album by Sonic Youth
- Released: 17 Jun 2016
- Recorded: September – October 1986
- Studio: Spinhead Studios, North Hollywood, CA 1986
- Genre: experimental rock
- Length: 40:26
- Label: Goofin' Records – GOO 021
- Producer: Sonic Youth

Professional ratings
Review scores
Source	Rating
Pitchfork	6.4/10
ClashMusic	8/10

Spinhead Sessions - 1986 is an album by Sonic Youth, containing rehearsals of music the band were preparing for the 1987 film Made in U.S.A.. The album was announced in April 2016. The band recorded this material in 1986, at Spinhead Studios, shortly after the completion of their album EVOL.

== Track listing ==
1. "Ambient Guitar & Dreamy Theme" - 16:39
2. "Theme With Noise" - 4:16
3. "High Mesa" - 8:36
4. "Unknown Theme" - 2:41
5. "Wolf" - 1:37
6. "Scalping" - 3:57
7. "Theme 1 Take 4" - 2:32
