= Live at the Continental Club =

Live album by Sonic Youth
- Released: 1992
- Recorded: April 12, 1986
- Venue: Continental Club (Austin, Texas)
- Genre: Noise rock; experimental rock; alternative rock
- Length: 49:46
- Label: Red Line

Sonic Youth live album chronology
Hold That Tiger (1991)	Live at the Continental Club (1992)	Battery Park, NYC July 4th 2008 (2009)

Live at the Continental Club is a live album by alternative rock band Sonic Youth, recorded at Continental Club in Austin, Texas, on April 12, 1986. Many of the songs performed were from their new album (at the time) EVOL.

== Track listing ==
1. "Tom Violence"
2. "Shadow of a Doubt"
3. "Starpower"
4. "Secret Girl"
5. "Death to Our Friends"
6. "Green Light"
7. "Kill Yr. Idols"
8. "Ghost Bitch"
9. "Expressway to Yr. Skull"
10. "World Looks Red"
11. "Confusion (Indeed)"
12. "Exit Stage-Applause"
13. "Outro"
