= TV Shit =

EP by Sonic Youth & Yamatsuka Eye
- Released: February 1994
- Recorded: 1993
- Length: 9:19
- Label: Ecstatic Peace!
- Producer: Sonic Youth

Sonic Youth chronology
Dirty (1992)	TV Shit (1994)	Experimental Jet Set, Trash and No Star (1994)

TV Shit is an EP by American alternative rock band Sonic Youth and Japanese vocalist Yamatsuka Eye. It was released in 1994 by Thurston Moore's record label Ecstatic Peace.

== Content ==
TV Shit is a series of covers, all of the same track: Washington, D.C. hardcore punk band Youth Brigade's song "No Song II". The original version was a one-second song consisting of the spoken word "no".

The album cover's spine and back cover (with the exception of the photo) were from the Karlheinz Stockhausen album Gesang der Jünglinge, which is often credited as being the first electronic album.

== Critical reception ==
Professional ratings
Review scores
Source	Rating
AllMusic	3/5 stars

Brian Flota of AllMusic called the EP "a fun, throwaway exercise" and "a must for all Sonic Youth fans, and it will alienate just about everyone else".

== Track listing ==
No.	Title	Length
1.	"No II (Part 1)"	0:51
2.	"No II (Part 2)"	1:13
3.	"No II (Part 3)"	3:30
4.	"No II (Part 4)"	3:45

== Personnel ==
- Sonic Youth

Additional personnel

- J. Mascis ("No II (Part 1)")
- Mark Arm ("No II (Part 1)")
