= Battery Park, NYC July 4th 2008 =

Live album by Sonic Youth

Live album by Sonic Youth
- Released: June 9, 2009
- Recorded: July 4, 2008
- Venue: Battery Park
- Length: 43:46
- Label: Matador

Sonic Youth live album chronology
Live at the Continental Club (1992)	Battery Park, NYC July 4th 2008 (2009)	Smart Bar Chicago 1985 (2012)

Battery Park, NYC July 4th 2008 is a live album by American noise punk band Sonic Youth, recorded at the River to River Festival in Battery Park, New York, on July 4, 2008. It was released June 9, 2009, coinciding with the release of The Eternal. It has only been released on vinyl and digital services. The album was mixed at Echo Canyon West, a studio often used by the band.

== Reception ==
Professional ratings
Review scores
Source	Rating
AllMusic	4/5 stars
Mojo	4/5 stars
OndaRock	7/10
Perfect Sound Forever	A+
Pitchfork	7.7/10
Robert Christgau	A
Spectrum Culture	3.5/5 stars
Tom Hull	B+

The album has been positively received by critics. In a review for Pitchfork, Susan Elizabeth Shepard says that while the album "isn’t their best or most comprehensive live document", it is further proof of how consistent their genius was and how enduring the qualities that made them such a special live act".

== Track listing ==
No.	Title	Length
1.	"She is Not Alone"	6:10
2.	"The Sprawl"	7:46
3.	"World Looks Red"	2:52
4.	"Jams Run Free"	3:45
5.	"Hey Joni"	4:28
6.	"The Wonder"	4:11
7.	"Hyperstation"	5:50
8.	"Bull in the Heather"	2:56
9.	"100%"	3:07
10.	"Making the Nature Scene"	2:41
Total length:		43:46

== Personnel ==
Adapted from LP liner notes.

- Kim Gordon, Lee Ranaldo, Mark Ibold, Steve Shelley, Thurston Moore – band
- Dan Mapp, Eric Baccht, Jeremy Lemos, Matt Zivich, Nic Close, Robin Easton – "Sonic Crew"
- Aaron Mullan – engineer, live mix
- John Golden – mastering
- Stefano Giovannini – photography
