= Feelee Records =

Russian record label

Feelee
- Founded: 1988; 37 years ago
- Founder: Igor Tonkikh
- Distributor(s): self-distribution (Territory), Mirumir
- Genre: Alternative rock, indie rock
- Country of origin: USSR, Russia
- Official website: feelee.ru

Feelee (Feelee Records, Feelee Promotion, Feelee Management & Record Company, «Фирма грамзаписи ФИЛИ») is one of the first Russian independent music labels, founded by Igor Tonkikh in 1988.

From the very beginning, Igor Tonkikh's company has been promoting the alternative scene in Russia. Feelee released the debut albums of such groups as Tequilajazzz, Zdob și Zdub, Pelageya, Nol and many others. Feelee Records is considered the main distributor of Western independent music in Russia, releasing licensed music releases from foreign labels: 4AD Records, Mute Records, Beggars Banquet, XL Recordings, Ninja Tune, Warp.

In addition to the record label, the Feelee parent company also included Feelee Promotion, an organizer of concerts and tours, and "Territory", which acted as a news agency and a distributor of Feelee Records products.

== History ==
When Igor Tonkikh started his activities in 1986, his private enterprise became one of the first in the USSR after the state monopoly of the only recording company at that time Melodiya was liquidated in the country. According to Igor, since then, many have firmly associated his name with the historic Moscow district of Fili, where he ran the recording and promotion company of the same name, called Feelee Management & Record Company. “Naturally, we called each of our meetings at Feelee nothing less than ‘Council at Fili’ - this expression ran through many cases. For all our self-irony, we understood that we are also making history". Since 1988, Feelee has started organizing concerts of foreign performers. The first of these were the British rock band World Domination Enterprises, which performed on March 8–9, 1988, and the American noise rock band Sonic Youth, which played a concert on April 12, 1989. The next were foreign bands The Shamen, Fred Frith, musicians Henry Keizer, Chris Cutler, Millions of Dead Cops and others.

The company's transition to the recording industry took place in 1991: the foundation of the Feelee Record Company was the renowned "Rock Against Terror" charity festival. The idea of the festival came from the musician Garik Sukachev, who suffered from the illegal actions of the 108th police station on the Arbat, and the Feelee company together with the VID company supported him. All the leading rock performers of the country of that time expressed a desire to perform at this festival: Garik Sukachev himself, the groups Alisa, DDT, Nautilus Pompilius, Chaif, CrossroadZ, Nuance, Mtsyri, Bix, AuktsYon, Kalinov Most. The whole concert was recorded and filmed. When it came time to release this record on gramophone record, this was the reason for Feelee to create their own record label. The first disc from Feelee Record Company was released in 1992, but it was dedicated not to the last rock festival, but to the Voskresenye group. Igor Tonkikh explains this by the fact that the musicians of "Voskresenya" were then reunited in the "golden composition", and the release of their album made it possible to assemble a group at a concert in the Gorbunov Palace of Culture. The second LP by Feelee Records contained a recording of the Rock Against Terror festival. In the same year, Feelee Records began to release music releases on CDs.

In 1994, Feelee Records signed a contract with Tequilajazzz (a band from St. Petersburg), which became one of the leaders of the alternative scene in Russia after a few years and became the unofficial "calling card" of the label. In the same year, Feelee became the main Russian distributor of Western independent music. The first release in this area was the album Into the Labyrinth by Dead Can Dance, released under license from 4AD Records. It was followed by the album of the group Nick Cave and the Bad Seeds - Let Love In (Mute Records). “As Lenya Zakharov from Komsomolskaya Pravda said: how to be known as a record company with good taste? You just have to sign a licensing agreement with a record company with good taste! After that we also became a distributor for Beggars Banquet, XL Recordings, Ninja Tune, Warp... there were a lot of good labels. We chose an independent niche from the very beginning. There was also an economic reason - the sector of all independents is approximately equal to the major; the repertoire is pleasant, there is no need to get dirty, you can earn money without prostitution. Without compromise” (Igor Tonkikh). In the same year, the InterMedia news agency recognized Feelee as the best show business company.

In 1995, the company holds the first extreme music festival "Learn to Swim", financially implementing the broadcast of the same name by Alexander F. Sklyar on Radio Maximum. In 1996 the festival received the status of an international festival and the status of the festival of two capitals (Moscow and St. Petersburg). A total of five festivals have been held, in honor of which five music compilations have been published by Feelee Records.

In 1998 Feelee Records received the "Record" award of the Russian music industry in the Foreign Album nomination - for the release of "Ultra" by Depeche Mode.

Feelee Records' activity declined in 2006 due to a crisis in the recording industry.

After a long hiatus from 2006 to 2012, Feelee Records returned to activity, celebrating the label's 20th anniversary. In honor of the anniversary, several of the label's classic albums were released on gramophone records and distributed via Mirumir. In 2013 Feelee Records released a new album MaximumHappy I from the punk rock band Tarakany!.

On August 3, 2020, within the framework of the Beat Film Festival, Andrey Airapetov's documentary “Feelee. A Story of One Label" was premiered, summarizing the first 30 years of Feelee Records label's existence.
