= Starpower =

Single by Sonic Youth

from the album Evol
- B-side: "Bubblegum", "Expressway to Yr Skull (Edit)"
- Released: July 1986
- Label: SST
- Songwriters: Kim Gordon, Thurston Moore, Lee Ranaldo, Steve Shelley
- Producer: Sonic Youth

Sonic Youth singles chronology
"Flower" (1985)	"Starpower" (1986)	"Teen Age Riot" (1988)

Professional ratings
Review scores
Source	Rating
AllMusic	3.5/5 stars

"Starpower" is a song by American alternative rock band Sonic Youth. It was released in 1986 by record label SST as the first and only single from the band's third studio album, EVOL. It was re-released on colored vinyl in both 1990 and 1991.

== Writing ==
Though Kim Gordon sang the studio version, the lyrics were written by Thurston Moore, and he sings on all concert versions.

== Content ==
Both versions of "Starpower" and "Expressway to Yr Skull" are edits. Mike Watt played bass on "Bubblegum", a Kim Fowley cover which was also the bonus track on the EVOL CD. Only the 7" version featured the first two songs; all other releases had all three. A live version of "Starpower" was referred to by Moore as "Watt Power", referring to bassist Watt.

== Release ==
"Starpower" was released in July 1986 by record label SST. Its first pressing on 7" vinyl" included an EVOL poster and pendant. A 10" was issued on various colors of vinyl, including grey and purple.

The 2009 Gossip Girl episode "Rufus Getting Married" featured a live version of this song, with Gordon on vocals. Gordon also acted in a small speaking role. Before the performance, Moore and guitarist Lee Ranaldo were shown tuning their guitars.

== Track listing ==
1. "Starpower (Edit)" – 2:50
2. "Bubblegum" (Kim Fowley) – 2:45
3. "Expressway to Yr Skull (Edit)" – 4:30
