= Dirty Boots =

1991 single by Sonic Youth

Single by Sonic Youth

from the album Goo
- Released: April 1991
- Studio: Sorcerer Sound Recording Studios and Greene St. Recording, New York City
- Genre: Alternative rock; noise rock
- Length: 5:24 (album version); 4:49 (single version)
- Label: DGC
- Songwriter: Sonic Youth
- Producers: Sonic Youth; Nick Sansano; Ron Saint Germain

Sonic Youth singles chronology
"Disappearer" (1990)	"Dirty Boots" (1991)	"100%" (1992)

Music video
- "Dirty Boots" on YouTube

"Dirty Boots" is a song by the American rock band Sonic Youth from their sixth studio album, Goo (1990). It was released as the third and final single from the album in April, 1991, by DGC Records. The song was written and produced by Sonic Youth, with additional production from Nick Sansano and Ron Saint Germain. The single included five live tracks taken from a concert recorded on November 3, 1990 at University of California, Irvine's Crawford Hall in Irvine, California. The complete show was released in 2019 as "Live In Irvine 1990", with it being part of the Sonic Youth Archive series of digital releases.

== Music video ==
The music video for "Dirty Boots" was directed by Tamra Davis. The video features a boy and girl who meet and fall in love at a Sonic Youth concert. At the climax, both get onstage and kiss passionately while the band continues to play; both are then escorted by bouncers into the audience via stage dive. The video was shot in a now-defunct New York City club called Beowulf. The boy, dressed in a flannel shirt, was played by Matthew Horn. The girl, in a Nirvana T-shirt, was played by Lisa Stansbury of Neptune, New Jersey. The band selected both, after seeing them at a Dinosaur Jr. show at Maxwell's in Hoboken.

== Track listings and formats ==
- 12" vinyl, cassette, and CD single
1. "Dirty Boots" (edit) – 4:49
2. "White Kross" (live) – 5:06
3. "Eric's Trip" (live) – 3:28
4. "Cinderella's Big Score" (live) – 6:34
5. "Dirty Boots" (live) – 6:13
6. "The Bedroom" (live) – 3:37
