= Leah Singer =

American photographer and artist

Fern Leah Singer (born November 5, 1962) is a photographer and multimedia artist. She is the long-time artistic collaborator and wife of Lee Ranaldo of Sonic Youth. Singer performs with multiple modified film projectors that allow her to improvise and manipulate the film projections by adjusting the frame rate. She has likened what she does with film as similar to DJs who scratch with records.

== Biography ==
Singer was born in Winnipeg, Manitoba, and studied journalism and photography at Ryerson Polytechnical Institute (now known as Toronto Metropolitan University) in Toronto. She moved to New York City in the 1980s to study film and became involved with improvisational musicians. She also trained as a painter. Her work combines these different approaches to mediums. Since 1991 she has been doing film and music collaborations with Ranaldo. Her work has been presented in museums, galleries and concert halls worldwide.

She married Lee Ranaldo in 1999. Her two sons are Sage Ranaldo and Frey Ranaldo. Singer has published several books with her husband, including Bookstore, Road Movies and Moroccan Journal: Jajouka excerpt. She went to Jajouka, Morocco, with Lee Ranaldo to follow in the footsteps of luminaries like William S. Burroughs, Brian Jones, Brion Gysin, Paul Bowles and Ornette Coleman.

Drift is documented in a DVD and book publication. The book includes a conversation with Ranaldo and Singer, and texts by experimental filmmaker Jonas Mekas, artists Sam Durant and Tom Leeser, writer and musician Alan Licht, and curators Roland Spekle and Lea Rekow.

Singer has also collaborated with Elliott Sharp and Ikue Mori.

== Published works ==
- Bookstore and Others (paperback) – Lee Ranaldo, Leah Singer, Hozomeen Press (April 1995), ISBN 978-1-885175-06-9
- Drift (paperback) – Lee Ranaldo, Leah Singer, Gigantic ArtSpace (2005), ISBN 978-1-933045-34-4
- Moroccan Journal: Jajouka excerpt (unknown binding) – Lee Ranaldo, Leah Singer, Ring Tarigh for the Literary Renaissance (1997), ASIN: B0006RJF80
- Road Movies (paperback) – Lee Ranaldo, Leah Singer, Soft Skull Press (November 2004), ISBN 978-1-932360-73-8
- Against Refusing - Lee Ranaldo, Cover Art by Leah Singer, Water Row Press, 2010, Hardcover, ISBN 978-0-934953-85-6
