= Bull in the Heather =

1994 single by Sonic Youth

Single by Sonic Youth

from the album Experimental Jet Set, Trash and No Star
- B-side: "Razor Blade"
- Released: April 19, 1994
- Studio: Sear Sound, New York City
- Genre: Noise rock; alternative rock
- Length: 3:04
- Label: Geffen
- Songwriter: Sonic Youth
- Producer: Butch Vig

Sonic Youth singles chronology
| "Drunken Butterfly" (1993) | "Bull in the Heather" (1994) | "Superstar" (1994) |

Music video
- "Bull in the Heather" on YouTube

"Bull in the Heather" is a song by American alternative rock band Sonic Youth from their eighth studio album, Experimental Jet Set, Trash and No Star (1994). It was released to radio as the lead single from the album on April 19, 1994, by Geffen Records. The song was written collectively by Sonic Youth, and production was done by Butch Vig. According to band member Kim Gordon, the song is about "using passiveness as a form of rebellion."

== Background ==
The single featured an outtake, "Razor Blade", and an alternate version of "Doctor's Orders" as B-sides.

Singer and bassist Kim Gordon explained that the song is about "using passiveness as a form of rebellion—like, I'm not going to participate in your male-dominated culture, so I'm just going to be passive". The song's title is a reference to the race horse Bull Inthe Heather [sic], who won the Florida Derby in 1993.

== Critical reception ==
Barbara O'Dair of Rolling Stone referred to the song as "enigmatic," highlighting Gordon's "breathy, talk-singing." Also from Rolling Stone, Matthew Perpetua praised the song's "graceful combinations of pop songwriting and off-kilter experimental noise," making note of the unorthodox guitar techniques employed throughout it.

== Chart performance ==
In the United States, "Bull in the Heather" debuted at number 29 on the Billboard Alternative Airplay chart for the issue dated May 28, 1994. The song reached a peak of number 13 for the issue dated June 18, 1994, spending a total of eight weeks on the chart. The song became Sonic Youth's highest-charting song in the United Kingdom, reaching a peak of number 24 on the UK Singles Chart for the issue dated May 7, 1994. The song spent a total of five weeks on the chart. In Australia, the song reached a peak position of number 90 on the ARIA Charts.

== Music video ==
The music video was directed by Tamra Davis and produced by Kris Krengle. Filmed in Los Angeles, the video features Bikini Kill singer Kathleen Hanna dancing and occasionally interacting with the band members, particularly guitarist Thurston Moore; she accidentally gave Moore a bloody lip during filming. Also featured are a young couple hanging out in a semi-wooded field and stock footage of horses racing.

The scenes of Moore and Lee Ranaldo jumping around on a bed were inspired by a photo of Moore when he was younger. At the time of the video, bassist Kim Gordon was five months pregnant.

The music video was featured in an episode of Beavis and Butt-Head.

== Live performances ==
Sonic Youth performed the song during their set at Battery Park's River to River Festival on July 4, 2008. A recording of this performance was released as a promotional single on June 7, 2019, and was subsequently included on the live album Battery Park, NYC July 4th 2008.

== Legacy ==
In 2007, NME placed "Bull in the Heather" at No. 48 in its list of the 50 "Greatest Indie Anthems Ever". Spin placed the song at No. 37 in its list of "The 100 Best Alternative Rock Songs of 1994".

"Bull in the Heather" directly influenced The Strokes' 2003 single "12:51", and lead singer Julian Casablancas would admit that the phrasing was "totally ripping it off".

== Track listings and formats ==
- 10" vinyl and CD single
1. "Bull in the Heather" (LP version) – 3:04
2. "Razor Blade" – 1:06
3. "Doctor's Orders" (T.-Vox version) – 4:20
- 7" vinyl and cassette single
1. "Bull in the Heather" (LP version) – 3:04
2. "Razor Blade" – 1:06

== Credits and personnel ==
Credits and personnel are adapted from the Experimental Jet Set, Trash and No Star album liner notes.

Sonic Youth

- Thurston Moore – guitar
- Kim Gordon – vocals, bass
- Lee Ranaldo – guitar
- Steve Shelley – drums, percussion

Technical

- Butch Vig – recording, mixing, production
- John Siket – engineering
- Howie Weinberg – mastering
- Bil Emmons – technician
- Devin Emke – technician
- Ed Raso – technician
- Fred Kevorkian – technician
- Ollie Cotton – technician
- Walter Sear – technician

== Charts ==
Chart performance for "Bull in the Heather"
| Chart (1994) | Peak position |
|---|---|
| Australia (ARIA) | 90 |
| Australia Alternative (ARIA) | 2 |
| Australia Hit Seekers (ARIA) | 12 |
| Europe (Eurochart Hot 100) | 82 |
| Finland (Suomen virallinen singlelista) | 19 |
| UK Singles (Official Charts) | 24 |
| US Alternative Airplay (Billboard) | 13 |
| US Alternative Airplay (Radio & Records) | 15 |

== Release history ==
Release dates and formats for "Bull in the Heather"
| Region | Date | Format(s) | Label(s) | Ref. |
|---|---|---|---|---|
| United States | April 19, 1994 | Alternative radio; college radio | DGC | |
| United Kingdom | April 25, 1994 | 10-inch vinyl; CD; cassette | DGC | |
| Australia | May 16, 1994 | CD; cassette | DGC | |
