= Sister (Sonic Youth album) =

1987 studio album by Sonic Youth

- Original uncensored LP cover

Studio album by Sonic Youth
- Released: June 1, 1987
- Recorded: March–April 1987
- Studios: Sear Sound, Manhattan
- Genres: Alternative rock; noise rock; post-punk
- Length: 37:32
- Label: SST
- Producer: Sonic Youth

Sonic Youth chronology
Walls Have Ears (1986)	Sister (1987)	Master-Dik (1987)

Sonic Youth studio album chronology
EVOL (1986)	Sister (1987)	Daydream Nation (1988)

Sister is the fourth studio album by the American alternative rock band Sonic Youth, released on SST Records on June 1, 1987. The album represented a continuation of the band's evolution on their previous album EVOL, moving away from the no wave movement towards alternative rock song structures while maintaining an experimental approach. It was their first album with the lineup from the previous album intact, with Thurston Moore, Kim Gordon, Lee Ranaldo, and Steve Shelley all returning.

The album, written while on tour and recorded in early 1987, is a loose concept album inspired by the life and works of writer Philip K. Dick.

Like Sonic Youth's previous albums, Sister was not commercially successful at the time of its release, but received critical acclaim. Retrospectively, several publications have named it as one of the best albums of the 1980s.

== Background and recording ==
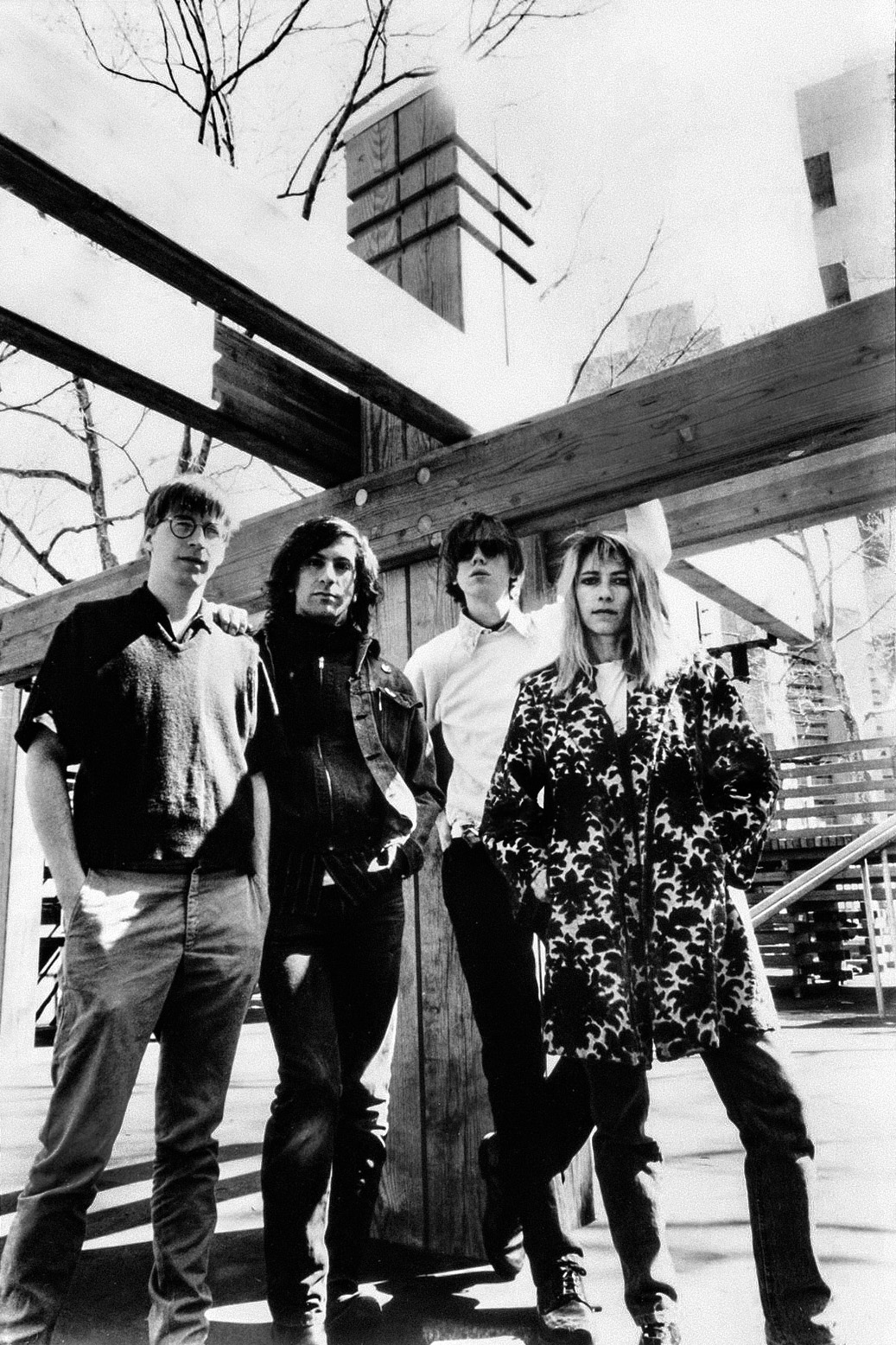
Sonic Youth in a 1987 publicity photo from the press kit for Sister. Left to right: Steve Shelley, Lee Ranaldo, Thurston Moore, and Kim Gordon.

Sonic Youth released their third album, EVOL, in May 1986. While touring in support of the album, the band began writing new material ("White Kross" had been written earlier, circa May 1986). Sister was recorded to 16-track tape in March and April 1987 with house engineer Bill Titus at Walter Sear's Sear Sound studio in Hell's Kitchen, Manhattan, entirely on analog equipment. A Moog modular synthesizer at the studio was used on "Pipeline/Kill Time".

In addition, around this time the band collaborated with Mike Watt of Minutemen, recording and releasing a single and album as "Ciccone Youth".

== Music and lyrics ==
Sister is a loose concept album (like its follow-up Daydream Nation), inspired in part by the life and works of American science fiction writer Philip K. Dick. Working titles for the album included Kitty Magic, Humpy Pumpy, and Sol-Fuc, but it was ultimately named Sister as a reference to Dick's fraternal twin, who died shortly after her birth and whose memory haunted Dick his entire life. "Sister" was also the original title of opening track "Schizophrenia"; Thurston Moore often introduced it as "Sister" in concert.

According to Sputnikmusic's Adam Downer, Sister deviated from the frenetic sound of Sonic Youth's previous music in favor of a refined style of noise pop that would typify the band's subsequent work. The album features aggressive noise rock songs such as "White Kross" and "Catholic Block", although it also featured more traditional alternative rock song structures. Some of the lyrics on "Schizophrenia" were originally written for early song "Come Around" ("Your future is static, It's already had it/But I got a hunch, it's coming back to me"). "Sister" was the original title for "Schizophrenia", and a live recording of the song from June 4, 1987 at The Town and Country Club in London was released on the B-side of a bootleg 7" single under that title. The A-side featured their cover of the Stooges' "I Wanna Be Your Dog" with Iggy Pop. Both tracks from the single were later issued on the VHS portion of the 1995 compilation Screaming Fields of Sonic Love.

The band used acoustic guitars on some songs on the album for "melodic" purposes, including on "(I Got A) Catholic Block" and "Beauty Lies in the Eye", which used three or four guitars. "Pipeline/Kill Time", sung by Ranaldo, was written on April 5, 1987, although several lyrics were not included in the final song. "Tuff Gnarl"'s working titles were "Sea-Sik" and "Smart and Fast"; Watt covered the song on his album Ball-Hog or Tugboat? with Moore, Ranaldo, and Steve Shelley. "Hot Wire My Heart" is a cover of a song by Crime. "Kotton Krown" (or "Cotton Crown") was the band's first duet between Gordon and Moore, although Moore usually sang it alone during live performances. The closing track, "White Kross", was the oldest song on the album and was featured on an NME 7". On the band's 1987 European tour, they extended the song with an improvised coda which was later named "Broken Eye".

== Packaging ==
The artwork of the original front cover contained a photograph of 12-year-old Sandra Bennett, taken by Richard Avedon on August 23, 1980 and used as the cover of his book In the American West, published in 1985. The photo was censored for later releases after a threat of a copyright lawsuit. At first the picture was merely covered up with a black sticker, but on later pressings the photo was totally removed, only showing a black area. Similarly, a photo of the Magic Kingdom at Walt Disney World on the back cover was later obscured by a Universal Product Code. Very early promotional posters and pressings of the album did feature these photos, but later ones did not.

The band is called "The Sonic Youth" rather than "Sonic Youth" on the cover.

== Release and promotion ==
Sister was released in June 1987 by SST (USA) and Blast First (UK) on vinyl, CD and cassette. After its release, the band began their European tour, during which a part of the Master-Dik EP was recorded at a radio session in Geneva. They toured the United States in September and October, replacing their usual encores of "Hot Wire My Heart" and "I Wanna Be Your Dog" with four Ramones covers. A recording of a concert on October 14 in Chicago was released in 1991 as Hold That Tiger.

Videos were shot for "Beauty Lies in the Eye" and "Stereo Sanctity". The black-and-white "Stereo Sanctity" video, featuring clips of whirring factory machinery and brief live shots of the band, can only be seen on a rare 1980s SST video compilation titled Over 35 Videos Never Before Released. The band did not release an official single from the album.

== Critical reception ==
Professional ratings
Review scores
Source	Rating
AllMusic	5/5 stars
Blender	4/5 stars
Chicago Tribune	3.5/4 stars
The Encyclopedia of Popular Music	4/5 stars
Los Angeles Times	3.5/4 stars
Pitchfork	9.8/10
Q	4/5 stars
The Rolling Stone Album Guide	5/5 stars
Spin Alternative Record Guide	9/10
The Village Voice	A

In a contemporary review for The Village Voice, music critic Robert Christgau, who had previously feuded with the band, called Sister an album that was finally worthy of their aesthetic. Christgau said that while Sonic Youth had learned to temper their penchant for "insanity", their guitar sound was still "almost unique in its capacity to evoke rock and roll without implicating them in a history few youngish bands can bear up under these days". In a negative review, Spin magazine said that the band had failed to successfully mix their previous "nonsense" with "real rock tunage".

The album was voted the 12th best album of the year in The Village Voice's annual Pazz & Jop critics poll for 1987. Christgau, the poll's creator, ranked it fifth on his own list. The album ranked No. 4 among "Albums of the Year" for 1987 in the annual NME critics' poll.

== Legacy ==
In a retrospective review, AllMusic editor Stephen Thomas Erlewine called Sister "a masterpiece" and "one of the singular art rock records of the 1980s, surpassed only by Sonic Youth's next album, Daydream Nation". Slant Magazine called it "the last great punk album of the Reagan era, and the first great pop album to emerge from the American underground", while listing it as the 72nd best album of the 1980s. Pitchfork ranked Sister as the 14th best album of the 1980s. NME rated it No. 80 in their list of the greatest albums ever, and No. 37 in their list of the 50 greatest albums of the 1980s. In July 1995, Alternative Press magazine voted Sister the third best album of the decade spanning 1985–1995. Paste magazine's Josh Jackson listed the album at No. 39 on his list of "The 50 Best Post-Punk Albums", saying, "While the following year's Daydream Nation may be their indie-rock masterpiece, the weirder, more muscular Sister exemplifies everything great about post-punk music."

== Track listing ==
All tracks are written by Sonic Youth (Lee Ranaldo, Kim Gordon, Thurston Moore, Steve Shelley), except "Hot Wire My Heart" by Johnny Strike.

No.	Title	Vocals	Length
1.	"Schizophrenia"	Gordon, Moore	4:38
2.	"(I Got A) Catholic Block"	Moore	3:26
3.	"Beauty Lies in the Eye"	Gordon	2:20
4.	"Stereo Sanctity"	Moore	3:50
5.	"Pipeline/Kill Time"	Ranaldo	4:35
6.	"Tuff Gnarl"	Moore	3:15
7.	"Pacific Coast Highway"	Gordon	4:18
8.	"Hot Wire My Heart" (Crime cover)	Moore, Gordon, Ranaldo	3:23
9.	"Kotton Krown (Note: This track was named "Kotton Krown" on the CD/LP label on the original Blast First release and LP label on the original SST release, but was named "Cotton Crown" on the CD label on the original SST release, the subsequent reissues and in the booklets in all releases.)"	Gordon, Moore	5:08
10.	"White Kross (Note: This track was named "White Kross" on the CD/LP label on the original Blast First release and LP label on the original SST release, but was named "White Cross" on the CD label on the original SST release, the subsequent reissues and in the booklets in all releases.)"	Moore	2:59

CD bonus track
No.	Title	Length
11.	"Master-Dik"	5:10

== Personnel ==
Sonic Youth

- Thurston Moore – electric guitar (all except 3), vocals, Moog synthesizer (5), bass guitar (3), production
- Kim Gordon – bass guitar (all except 3), vocals, production
- Lee Ranaldo – electric guitar, acoustic guitar, vocals, production
- Steve Shelley – drums, production

Technical

- Bill Titus – engineering
- Howie Weinberg – mastering
- Walter Sear – Moog programming, engineering
- Lucius Shepard – sleeve illustration

== Release history ==
Region	Date	Distributing Label	Format
US, UK	June, 1987	SST Records, Blast First	Vinyl, CD, Cassette
Brazil	1989	Stileto	Vinyl
US, Europe	1994	DGC, Geffen	CD, Cassette
UK	1996	Mute	vinyl
US	2011	ORG Music	Purple marble vinyl
