= Nick Sansano =

American record producer, engineer, and musician

Nick Sansano (born 1963 in The Bronx, New York City) is an American record producer, engineer, and musician. A graduate of Berklee College of Music, he began his career at Greene St. Recording, where he recorded and mixed for a variety of ground-breaking hip hop artists including Public Enemy, Ice Cube, Rob Base and Run DMC. From there, he went on to co-produce Sonic Youth's Daydream Nation and Goo, two critically acclaimed and historical alternative music recordings that changed the landscape of popular music. He also engineered and mixed selections from Public Enemy's albums It Takes a Nation of Millions to Hold Us Back, Fear of a Black Planet and Muse Sick-n-Hour Mess Age. Additional hip hop credits include Ice Cube's AmeriKKKa's Most Wanted and mixing the rap classic "It Takes Two" by Rob Base and DJ E-Z Rock. He also worked with Jon Spencer Blues Explosion (ACME), Bubblies (No Brain, No Headache...), Stuck In The Sound (Shoegazing Kids), Le Tigre (This Island), Galactic (Late For The Future, Love 'Em Tonight: Live at Tipitina's), Stanton Moore (Flyin' The Koop), and The Grassy Knoll (III).'

In 2004, Sansano began teaching at The Clive Davis Institute of Recorded Music. In addition to being an arts professor, Sansano is the Director of Production and the Chair of the Institute.

== Awards ==
Nick's genre-crossing work has taken him around the world. In France, he found success producing multi-platinum recordings for the groups IAM, Zebda, and Noir Désir, with all three groups winning Victoire de la Musique awards for album of the year, all three in different genres. In total, Nick has been awarded over 15 gold, platinum and/or diamond record awards in the US and Europe.
