= Walls Have Ears =

Live album (bootleg) by Sonic Youth
- Released: 1986
- Recorded: April 28, 1985; October 30, 1985; November 8, 1985
- Genre: Noise rock
- Length: 76:32
- Label: Not

Sonic Youth chronology
| EVOL (1986) | Walls Have Ears (1986) | Sister (1987) |

Walls Have Ears is a Sonic Youth bootleg live recording from 1985. It was released on 2×12″ vinyl in 1986 without the consent of the band.

The album was officially released on February 9, 2024, via Goofin' Records.

== Content ==
Tracks 1–7 were recorded live on October 30, 1985, in London. Track 8 was recorded live on November 8, 1985, at Brighton Beach in Brighton. Tracks 9–17 were recorded live on April 28, 1985, in London.

The April tracks were recorded with members Thurston Moore, Lee Ranaldo, Kim Gordon and Bob Bert. The remainder featured new drummer Steve Shelley replacing Bert.

== Response ==
=== Critics ===
Professional ratings
Aggregate scores
| Source | Rating |
|---|---|
| Metacritic | 86/100 |
Review scores
| Source | Rating |
| AllMusic | 4.5/5 stars |
| Exclaim! | 8/10 |
| Paste | 7.8/10 |
| Pitchfork | 7.8/10 |
| PopMatters | 9/10 |

Walls Have Ears received a score of 86 out of 100 on review aggregator Metacritic based on four critics' reviews, indicating "universal acclaim". Heather Phares of AllMusic commented that "Despite its thorny history, this is an exhilarating portrait of the band's shift from their no wave beginnings to the more complex and melodic style that defined their later work." Myles Tiessen of Exclaim! felt that "the artfully rendered chaos found on Walls Have Ears was the first time the band was captured achieving the deliverance Gordon writes about".

Paste's Grace Ann Natanawan summarized the album as "a fledgling version of the band begin[ning] to hone this chaos in an unrestrained live setting". Reviewing the album for PopMatters, Christopher J. Lee wrote that its tracks "underscore the long, uncompromising road taken for their eventual success" and as a whole called it "a wild, unvarnished listen that gets back to the difficult, defiant essence of Sonic Youth". Pitchfork's Samuel Hyland judged that it "pinpoints the band between sputtering sound system and well-oiled noise machine, soon to transcend fringe credibility for alt-rock titanhood".

In his book Psychic Confusion: The Sonic Youth Story, author Stevie Chick wrote, "[A case is made] that the best illicit releases prove that artists sometimes aren't the best judges of their own artistic output. The Walls Have Ears is such an album; unloved by its creators, but a crucial and electrifying document of the group at their live best, playing with violent and ecstatic abandon".

=== The band ===
According to Moore, "Our creative control was put on the spot by this guy. We were kinda livid".

== Track listing ==
1. "C.B." – 2:11
2. "Green Love" ("Green Light") – 4:06
3. "Brother James" – 3:13
4. "Kill Yr. Idols" – 2:57
5. "I Love Her All the Time" – 5:08
6. "Expressway to Yr. Skull" – 9:33
7. "Spahn Ranch Dance" ("Death Valley '69") – 6:57
8. "Blood on Brighton Beach" ("Making the Nature Scene") – 3:43
9. "Burning Spear" – 4:36
10. "Death Valley '69" – 6:41
11. "Speed JAMC" – 1:25
12. "Ghost Bitch" – 5:56
13. "I'm Insane" (unlisted) – 4:27
14. "The World Looks Red" – 4:52
15. "The Word (E.V.O.L.)" ("Flower") – 3:02
16. "Brother Jam-Z" ("Brother James") – 4:49
17. "Killed and Kicked Off" ("Kill Yr. Idols") – 2:56

== Charts ==
Chart performance for Walls Have Ears
| Chart (2024) | Peak position |
|---|---|
| UK Independent Albums (Official Charts) | 45 |
