= EVOL (Sonic Youth album) =

1986 studio album by Sonic Youth

Studio album by Sonic Youth
- Released: May 1986
- Recorded: March 1986
- Studios: BC Studio, Brooklyn
- Genres: Noise rock; punk rock; art punk
- Length: 36:08
- Label: SST (059)
- Producers: Sonic Youth; Martin Bisi

Sonic Youth chronology
Bad Moon Rising (1985)	EVOL (1986)	Walls Have Ears (1986)

Singles from EVOL
- 1. "Starpower" Released: July 1986

EVOL is the third studio album by the American alternative rock band Sonic Youth. Released in May 1986, EVOL was Sonic Youth’s first album on SST Records, and also their first to feature drummer Steve Shelley, who would remain a member of the band until their dissolution in 2011.

By this point, the band had developed a cult following in the underground American music scene, but their style had begun to evolve from their earliest recordings. In retrospective reviews, critics cite EVOL as marking Sonic Youth’s transition from their no wave roots toward a more pop-influenced sensibility, with Shelley's drumming style a key aspect of this change. Bassist Kim Gordon has referred to it as the band’s “Faux-goth record.”

The album has been widely acclaimed since its release. Pitchfork has praised the album, saying that EVOL "[was] where the seeds of greatness were sown", and placed the album 31st on their "Top 100 Albums of the 1980s" list, alongside Sonic Youth's next two albums, Sister and Daydream Nation, which ranked 14th and first, respectively.

== Background ==
Going into EVOL, the band was coming off of a string of underground hits, becoming a popular underground live act as well as earning critical acclaim. In June 1985, during the Bad Moon Rising tour, drummer Bob Bert left the band and was replaced by Shelley. The new lineup quickly began working on new material for their third album.

The band signed to SST as, by 1986, label founder Greg Ginn was anxious for the label to move away from its American hardcore roots. Sonic Youth took a break from the tour and finished the writing for EVOL. In March 1986, the band recorded the album at BC Studio with Martin Bisi. EVOL was the second time that the band had worked with New York singer and performance artist Lydia Lunch. Lunch had shared vocals on Bad Moon Rising's "Death Valley '69", and on this record, she co-wrote the song "Marilyn Moore".

== Content ==
Mike Watt played bass guitar on the tracks "In the Kingdom #19" and the band's cover of "Bubblegum". The band encouraged him to play on the former track shortly after Watt's Minutemen bandmate D. Boon died in a car crash. Watt had entered a severe depression following Boon's death and was considering leaving music; he credited the time he spent with the members of Sonic Youth during the recording of EVOL as a major factor in his decision to resume his music career. Watt's next band, Firehose, would support Sonic Youth on their Flaming Telepaths tour. During this time, the band began the Ciccone Youth side project, which featured all members of Sonic Youth and Watt. They released a single consisting of three tracks: "Into the Groove(y)" (a cover of Madonna's "Into the Groove") and the short "Tuff Titty Rap" on the A-side (both performed by the Sonic Youth members), and "Burnin' Up" (performed by Watt and Ginn) on the B-side. The project later resulted in 1988's The Whitey Album.

On the vinyl version of the album, the time length for "Expressway to Yr. Skull" was indicated by the infinity symbol (∞); the final moment of the song featured a locked groove. The CD and cassette versions added a cover of Kim Fowley's "Bubblegum" as a bonus track. According to Watt, he and Shelley played the basic rhythm track over Fowley's recording, which was afterwards removed when the other members added their parts.

== Packaging ==
The album cover features a picture of model/actress Lung Leg in a still taken from the Richard Kern film Submit to Me. Leg had previously appeared in the "Death Valley '69" music video (directed by Kern and Judith Barry). The back cover shows a black-and-white picture of the band in a heart-shaped frame. The album's 10 songs are listed in a different order than the actual track listing. The members' names are listed on the back cover as well, although no instruments are assigned for them. It reads "guitars, vocals, drums", with "bass" hidden beneath the photograph of the band. The insert features the lyrics to the songs and the A-side depicts Thurston Moore, with eyes drawn on his hands, holding them up to his face. This photograph was later used for the cover of the "Starpower" single. To the left of this photograph is a panel from the Marvel comic book The New Mutants (found on the second page of issue #14, published April 1984). The other side contains pictures from horror films Friday the 13th Part 2 and Children of the Corn, with a still photo from the 1962 film House of Women featuring Constance Ford and Barbara Nichols. This image is only featured on the initial SST vinyl pressing and vinyl reissues after 2010, and was blacked out for all other releases.

== Promotion ==
Sonic Youth debuted the new material for EVOL on April 12, 1986 in Austin, Texas; a recording of that show was later released in 1992 as Live at the Continental Club. EVOL was released in May 1986 by SST on vinyl and cassette. The band toured Europe in May and June, performing tracks from the album (although "In the Kingdom #19" and "Bubblegum" were never played live). The band also debuted "White Kross", which was later featured on Sister. Following the European tour, they toured America in June and July. In July, the band released the only single from EVOL, "Starpower". It was backed by "Bubblegum" and an edited version of "Expressway to Yr. Skull". A video was never released for "Starpower". However, a video for "Shadow of a Doubt" was released, directed by Kevin Kerslake and featuring Gordon sitting on a train. After the tour, the band recorded the Made in USA soundtrack, but it was not released until 1995. EVOL was released on CD in late 1986.

== Reception ==
Professional ratings
Review scores
Source	Rating
AllMusic	4.5/5 stars
Blender	3/5 stars
Chicago Tribune	3.5/4 stars
Encyclopedia of Popular Music	4/5 stars
Pitchfork	9.4/10
Q	4/5 stars
The Rolling Stone Album Guide	4/5 stars
Spin	5/5 stars
Spin Alternative Record Guide	8/10
The Village Voice	B+

The album has been well received by critics. Robert Christgau, with whom the band had sparred in previous years, gave the album a B+. Stephen Thomas Erlewine would write for Allmusic, "A product of a band finding its way between worlds, EVOL is a remarkably strong effort, and sets the stage for crystallizing ideas that would soon result in what many considered the band's finest work."

Writing for Pitchfork, Jenn Pelly rated the album a 9.4/10, writing, "Like most Sonic Youth albums, EVOL is packed with so many ideas, so much rigor and obsession, it is too absurd to begin to wonder what they would have done in our current era of endless information. But if EVOL is one of Sonic Youth’s more do-it-yourself records, that manifests as an inspired 'do anything yourself,' as a 40-minute testament to the virtue of curiosity. For all the 'NO' that Sonic Youth’s earliest iteration espoused, EVOL explodes possibility, offering 'yes' after profound 'yes.'"

== Legacy ==
EVOL was described as a noise rock album and a "art punk masterwork", and was ranked 30th in Rolling Stone magazine's list of the "40 Greatest Punk Albums of All Time".

It ranked number 4 among the "Albums of the Year" by NME. Slant Magazine, who placed EVOL at number 82 on their Best Albums of the 1980s list, described it as "one of [Sonic Youth's] strangest albums" and "a difficult album that's nonetheless one of the best latter-day invocations of no wave chaos." Pitchfork described the album as "the true departure point of Sonic Youth's musical evolution – in measured increments, Thurston Moore and Lee Ranaldo began to bring form to the formless, tune to the tuneless, and with the help of Steve Shelley's drums, they imposed melody and composition on their trademark dissonance." Pitchfork went on to say that EVOL "[was] where the seeds of [the band's] greatness were sown", and placed it 31st on their list of the Top 100 Albums of the 1980s. Trouser Press labeled it "a near-masterpiece", and Stephen Thomas Erlewine of AllMusic gave the album a 4.5-star review, deeming it "a stunningly fluent mixture of avant-garde instrumentation and subversions of rock & roll."

The album was later deemed "a classic" by Neil Young, who called "Expressway to Yr. Skull" "incredibly good, so beautiful. It's a classic. Superb melody, and even better live."

Teenage Fanclub singer and guitarist Norman Blake has stated that Evol and Sonic Youth's 1988 album Daydream Nation were "the main influences" on the band's first album A Catholic Education.

Pavement frontman Stephen Malkmus has praised EVOL, saying that "Expressway to Yr. Skull" is "one of my absolutely favorite songs [sic]," and that it "offers everything that alternative guitar music can do during this time." Malkmus has also stated that the album inspired him to experiment with alternative guitar tunings, which became key to his own style.

== Track listing ==
All tracks are written by Sonic Youth (Thurston Moore, Kim Gordon, Lee Ranaldo, Steve Shelley), except "Marilyn Monroe" with music by Sonic Youth and lyrics by Lydia Lunch.

Side A
No.	Title	Vocals	Length
1.	"Tom Violence"	Moore	3:05
2.	"Shadow of a Doubt"	Gordon	3:32
3.	"Starpower"	Gordon	4:48
4.	"In the Kingdom #19"	Ranaldo	3:24
5.	"Green Light"	Moore	3:46

Side B
No.	Title	Vocals	Length
6.	"Death to Our Friends"		3:16
7.	"Secret Girl"	Gordon	2:54
8.	"Marilyn Moore"	Moore	4:04
9.	"Expressway to Yr. Skull"	Moore	7:19

Cassette/CD/digital bonus track
No.	Title	Writer(s)	Vocals	Length
10.	"Bubblegum" (Kim Fowley cover)	Fowley	Gordon, Ranaldo	2:49

Cassette version
No.	Title	Length
1.	"Green Light"	3:37
2.	"Starpower"	4:53
3.	"Secret Girl"	2:54
4.	"Tom Violence"	3:06
5.	"Death to Our Friends"	3:15
6.	"Shadow of a Doubt"	3:35
7.	"Marilyn Moore"	4:04
8.	"In the Kingdom #19"	3:24
9.	"Madonna, Sean and Me"	7:20
10.	"Bubblegum"	3:00

Note: "Expressway to Yr. Skull" was listed on the back cover as "Madonna, Sean and Me" and on the lyric sheet as "The Crucifixion of Sean Penn".
Note: "Secret Girl" was listed as "Secret Girls" on the inner label of the LP release.

== Personnel ==
Sonic Youth

- Thurston Moore – vocals, electric guitar, synthesizer, production
- Kim Gordon – vocals, bass guitar, electric guitar, piano ("Secret Girl"), production
- Lee Ranaldo – electric guitar, vocals, production, sleeve photography
- Steve Shelley – drums, programming, production

Guest musicians

- Mike Watt – bass guitar ("In the Kingdom #19", "Bubblegum")

Production

- Martin Bisi – production, engineering
- JG (John Golden) – mastering

== Release history ==
Region	Date	Distributing label	Format
US, UK	May, 1986	SST Records, Blast First	Vinyl, cassette
UK	November, 1986	Blast First	CD
US	1987	SST Records	CD
US	1990	SST Records	Pink vinyl
US	1994	DGC	CD, Cassette
Europe, Japan	1994	Geffen	CD
UK	April 1996	Mute	Vinyl
US	2010	ORG Music	Pink vinyl

== Sources ==
- Azerrad, Michael (2001). Our Band Could Be Your Life. New York: Little, Brown.
