= Hits Are for Squares =

Greatest hits album by Sonic Youth
- Released: June 10, 2008
- Recorded: 1982–2008
- Genres: Noise rock; alternative rock; experimental rock
- Length: 76:09
- Label: Starbucks Entertainment
- Producer: Tim Ziegler

Sonic Youth chronology
| SYR7: J'Accuse Ted Hughes (2008) | Hits Are for Squares (2008) | SYR8: Andre Sider Af Sonic Youth (2008) |

Hits Are for Squares is the first greatest hits album by American rock band Sonic Youth, released on June 10, 2008, by Starbucks Entertainment. The album features 15 songs spanning Sonic Youth's career since the release of their debut studio album in 1983, Confusion Is Sex. It also includes one new song: "Slow Revolution". The band intended to create a compilation album that appealed to the casual consumer.

Hits Are for Squares received acclaim from critics, who noted it as a strong introduction to the band's music.

== Background and release ==
On June 15, 2007, Thurston Moore announced that Sonic Youth was recording a new song for a compilation album under Starbucks Entertainment. Due to the decline of record stores in the 2000s, the band strived to expand upon their audience through partnering with the company. The band initially reached out to Starbucks to promote their fourteenth studio album Rather Ripped (2006) in the company's coffeehouses, however, this suggestion was halted by a six-month approval process. As a result, the band opted to make a compilation album under the company that would appeal to the casual consumer. With Billboard, Moore shared his thoughts on the release:

In a way, Sonic Youth has a branded name. People know the name, but not necessarily our music, which might be a little too outsider for some. And when they do hear a little something, it doesn't tell the whole story. I thought it would be interesting to have a CD available in a store like Starbucks where the casual consumer can sort of have access to [our music] more readily.

On July 2, 2007, Sonic Youth issued a press release in which they confirmed the name of the album as Hits Are for Squares and announced a tentative release date of early 2008. The band also confirmed that the album would be co-released under Starbucks Entertainment and Universal Special Markets. On May 21, 2008, the band officially announced the release date as June 10, 2008. The album featured fifteen previously released songs in addition to one new recording titled "Slow Revolution". The fifteen previously released songs were individually selected by celebrities for inclusion, including Catherine Keener, Mike D, Beck, Radiohead, Portia de Rossi, Diablo Cody, Allison Anders, Dave Eggers, Mike Watt, Eddie Vedder, Michelle Williams, Flea, Gus Van Sant, David Cross, Chloë Sevigny, and The Flaming Lips. Approximately 1,000 copies of the album were printed as CDs for purchase at select Starbucks locations, although the album was also made available for digital download. On April 17, 2010, the album was reissued on vinyl for Record Store Day. On April 20, 2024, the album was reissued on vinyl again for Record Store Day.

== Critical reception ==
Professional ratings
Review scores
| Source | Rating |
|---|---|
| AllMusic | 3.5/5 stars |
| BBC Music | positive |
| The New Zealand Herald | 4/5 stars |
| PopMatters | 7/10 |
| The Rolling Stone Album Guide | 4/5 stars |
| The Skinny | 4/5 stars |
| Uncut | 5/5 stars |

Heather Phares of AllMusic praised the album, in which she stated that it "works surprisingly well as an introduction to Sonic Youth's sound and approach."

== Track listing ==
All tracks are written by Kim Gordon, Thurston Moore, Lee Ranaldo and Steve Shelley except "Superstar". "The World Looks Red" written by Kim Gordon, Thurston Moore, Lee Ranaldo, Jim Sclavunos and Michael Gira.

| No. | Title | Original Album | Length |
|---|---|---|---|
| 1. | "Bull in the Heather" (selected by Catherine Keener, actress) | Experimental Jet Set, Trash and No Star, 1994 | 3:06 |
| 2. | "100%" (selected by Mike D of Beastie Boys) | Dirty, 1992 | 2:30 |
| 3. | "Sugar Kane" (selected by Beck) | Dirty | 5:58 |
| 4. | "Kool Thing" (selected by Radiohead) | Goo, 1990 | 4:07 |
| 5. | "Disappearer" (selected by Portia de Rossi, actress) | Goo | 5:08 |
| 6. | "Superstar" (selected by Diablo Cody, screenwriter; Bonnie Bramlett, Leon Russell) | If I Were a Carpenter, 1994 | 4:08 |
| 7. | "Stones" (selected by Allison Anders, film director) | Sonic Nurse, 2004 | 7:08 |
| 8. | "Tuff Gnarl" (selected by Dave Eggers, writer and Mike Watt, bassist) | Sister, 1987 | 3:16 |
| 9. | "Teen Age Riot" (selected by Eddie Vedder, Pearl Jam's vocalist) | Daydream Nation, 1988 | 6:58 |
| 10. | "Shadow of a Doubt" (selected by Michelle Williams, actress) | EVOL, 1986 | 3:34 |
| 11. | "Rain on Tin" (selected by Flea, Red Hot Chili Peppers's bassist) | Murray Street, 2002 | 7:55 |
| 12. | "Tom Violence" (selected by Gus Van Sant, film director) | EVOL | 3:07 |
| 13. | "Mary-Christ" (selected by David Cross, comedian) | Goo | 3:11 |
| 14. | "The World Looks Red" (selected by Chloë Sevigny, actress) | Confusion Is Sex, 1983 | 2:41 |
| 15. | "Expressway to Yr Skull" (selected by The Flaming Lips) | EVOL | 7:08 |
| 16. | "Slow Revolution" | New song, 2008 | 6:14 |
| Total length: | | | 76:09 |
