= SYR6: Koncertas Stan Brakhage prisiminimui =

Live album by Sonic Youth with Tim Barnes
- Released: December 6, 2005
- Recorded: April 12, 2003
- Genres: Free improvisation; experimental
- Length: 65:31
- Label: SYR
- Producer: Sonic Youth

SYR series chronology
| SYR5 (2000) | SYR6: Koncertas Stan Brakhage prisiminimui (2005) | SYR7: J'Accuse Ted Hughes (2008) |

Sonic Youth chronology
| Sonic Nurse (2004) | SYR6: Koncertas Stan Brakhage prisiminimui (2005) | Rather Ripped (2006) |

SYR6: Koncertas Stan Brakhage prisiminimui is a live album credited to "Sonic Youth su Tim Barnes". It was released on December 6, 2005, and is the sixth in a series of experimental releases issued on Sonic Youth's own SYR label.

== Background ==
SYR6 is a live recording of an April 12, 2003 benefit show for the Anthology Film Archives. The band, joined by percussionist Tim Barnes, played along with silent Stan Brakhage films.

SYR6 followed the tradition of having the liner notes in the SYR series written in foreign language titles, in this case, in Lithuanian. The meaning of the title is "a concert in memory of Stan Brakhage". The title and liner notes were translated by Lithuanian filmmaker Jonas Mekas.

SYR6 was the first in the SYR series to receive no release on vinyl.

== Track listing ==
| No. | Title | Length |
|---|---|---|
| 1. | "Heady Jam # 1" | 24:16 |
| 2. | "Heady Jam # 2" | 14:13 |
| 3. | "Heady Jam # 3" | 27:02 |

== Critical reception ==
Professional ratings
Review scores
| Source | Rating |
|---|---|
| AllMusic | no rating |
| The New York Times | mixed |
| Pitchfork | 7.0/10 |
| PopMatters | 6/10 stars |
| Uncut | 4/5 stars |

Pitchfork described the album as "luminescent and jarring music, possibly the best ever released in the SYR series, and it evokes the spiritual metamorphosis and physical pliability that Brakhage found in film."
