= The Destroyed Room: B-Sides and Rarities =

The Destroyed Room: B-sides and Rarities

Compilation album by Sonic Youth
- Released: December 12, 2006
- Recorded: 1994, 1995, 1999, 2001, 2003
- Genre: Alternative rock; noise rock; experimental rock
- Length: 76:49
- Label: DGC

Sonic Youth compilation album chronology
Screaming Fields of Sonic Love (1995)	The Destroyed Room: B-sides and Rarities (2006)	Hits Are for Squares (2008)

Sonic Youth chronology
Rather Ripped (2006)	The Destroyed Room: B-Sides and Rarities (2006)	SYR7: J'Accuse Ted Hughes (2008)

Singles from The Destroyed Room: B-sides and Rarities
- 1. "Beautiful Plateau" Released: 2006

The Destroyed Room: B-sides and Rarities is a compilation album by Sonic Youth. This album contains tracks previously only available on vinyl, limited-release compilations, imports and B-sides to international singles. The tracks, which also include unreleased material, were hand-picked by the band. The album was released on December 12, 2006. A double vinyl LP edition with two extra tracks was released in early 2007 on the band's own Goofin' Records label. The cover image, as well as the album's name, is "The Destroyed Room", a 1978 photograph by Canadian artist Jeff Wall.

== Reception ==
Professional ratings
Aggregate scores
Source	Rating
Metacritic	65/100
Review scores
Source	Rating
AllMusic	3.5/5 stars
Robert Christgau	(1-star Honorable Mention)
Pitchfork	7.2/10
PopMatters	8/10 stars
Rolling Stone	3/5 stars
Slant	3.5/5 stars
Spin	6/10
Stylus	C+

The album has a score of 65 out of 100 from Metacritic based on "generally favorable reviews". Filter gave the album a score of 91% and called it "an impeccably selected hodgepodge." NME gave it a score of 7 out of 10 and stated: "You hear a band capable of genuine prettiness as well as arch cleverness." However, other reviews are average, mixed or negative: The Austin Chronicle gave the album 3 of 5 stars and called it, "a sonically interesting mess but proof that not everything [Sonic Youth] record should be released." Under the Radar gave it 6 stars out of 10 and said it was "often more exciting, edgy and experimental than [the band's] previous work." Playlouder gave it 3 stars out of 5 and stated that "some of this record is excellent and after all this time [Sonic Youth] can still sound like four teenagers kicking up a racket in a rehearsal room." Uncut likewise gave it 3 stars and called it "a nicely ambient version of their usual hellacious harmonics, but also a reminder how the band have attained creative control on a major label." Now also gave it 3 stars and said it was "more for the dedicated convert than the curious." Hartford Courant gave it an average review, and said of the songs, "Even when they're abrasive, though, the songs are fascinating for what they show about the band's creative process." Drowned in Sound gave it a score of 5 out of 10, and said, "The majority of this record meanders along like a fuel-starved express train whose driver has taken an extended lunchbreak; experimental noise follows more experimental noise." Billboard gave the album a mixed review, saying it was, "overall, worth a spin or two, but one hopes there's a better stash left to sample." Yahoo! Music UK gave the album 3 of 10 stars, and called it "an aimless blur of humming amps, pointless mucking about with effects, dreary jams propelled by meandering guitar interplay, and bleak, endless droning."

== Track listing ==
CD version

1. "Fire Engine Dream" – 10:22
2. "Fauxhemians" - 4:04
3. "Razor Blade" - 1:08
4. "Blink" - 5:27
5. "Campfire" - 2:19
6. "Loop Cat" - 5:39
7. "Kim's Chords" - 6:02
8. "Beautiful Plateau" - 3:07
9. "Three-Part Sectional Love Seat" - 8:16
10. "Queen Anne Chair" - 4:37
11. "The Diamond Sea (LP version - Alternate Ending)" - 25:48

Double vinyl version

1. "Fire Engine Dream" – 10:22
2. "Fauxhemians" - 4:04
3. "Is It My Body?" - 2:49
4. "Doctor's Orders (T-vox version)" - 4:20
5. "Razor Blade" - 1:08
6. "Blink" - 5:27
7. "Campfire" - 2:19
8. "Loop Cat" - 5:39
9. "Kim's Chords" - 6:02
10. "Beautiful Plateau" - 3:07
11. "Three-Part Sectional Love Seat" - 8:16
12. "Queen Anne Chair" - 4:37
13. "The Diamond Sea (LP version - Alternate Ending)" - 25:48

== Track information ==
- Fire Engine Dream (2003) - outtake from Sonic Nurse; previously unreleased
- Fauxhemians (2002) - from the Noho Furniture sessions; originally released on the compilation All Tomorrow's Parties 1.1, released on ATP Records
- Is It My Body? (1991) - Alice Cooper cover; B-side from "Sugar Kane" single
- Doctor's Orders (T-vox version) (1994) - B-side from "Bull in the Heather" single
- Razor Blade (1994) - B-side from "Bull in the Heather" single
- Blink (1999) - from the Pola X Soundtrack
- Campfire (2000) - from the compilation At Home with the Groovebox, released on Grand Royal Records
- Loop Cat (2003) - from the compilation You Can Never Go Fast Enough, released on Plain Recordings
- Kim's Chords (2004) - from the British and Japanese edition of Sonic Nurse
- Beautiful Plateau (2004) - from the Japanese edition of Sonic Nurse
- Three-Part Sectional Love Seat (2001) - from the Noho Furniture sessions; previously unreleased
- Queen Anne Chair (2001) - from the Noho Furniture sessions; previously unreleased
- The Diamond Sea (1995) - full version from "The Diamond Sea" single; a slightly shorter version appeared on Washing Machine
