= Marnie Weber =

American artist (born 1959)

- Born: 1959 (age 66–67); Bridgeport, Connecticut, U.S.
- Education: University of Southern California, University of California
- Known for: sculpture, film, photography

Marnie Weber (born 1959) is an American artist who lives and works in Los Angeles. Her work includes photography, sculpture, installations, film, video, and performances. She is also a musician.

== Life and work ==
Marnie Weber was born in Bridgeport, Connecticut, U.S. and spent part of her childhood moving around Asia with her family. She studied at the University of Southern California, Los Angeles, CA, and received her B.A. from University of California, Los Angeles. She has had solo shows, video screenings, and performances throughout the United States and Europe.

Much of Weber's visual art revolves around a recurring cast of characters. An animal often found in her work is the bear, which is linked to the Greek goddess Artemis. These characters, among others, are placed in "vividly colorful environment[s]", ornate, Empire style interiors or dark, dense, eerie landscapes. Her work most often focuses on the adventures of women, which sometimes take the form of half-human, half-animal hybrids with bodies cut from pornographic magazines, and other times, pale-faced, folksy ghosts known as "Spirit Girls".

Marnie Weber's work is featured on the cover of the 1998 Sonic Youth album A Thousand Leaves.

The Spirit Girls was the name of Marnie Weber's six member drone-rock musical group. The Spirit Girls is also the name of Weber's multimedia conceptual project which used film, sculpture, collage, installation and performance to explore the after-life of the all-female rock band featured in four Weber films: Songs that Never Die (2005), A Western Song (2007), The Sea of Silence (2009) and Eternity Forever (2010). In the films, the Spirit Girls "are the specters of five adolescents, killed in their prime, who come back to the real world to 'express things they weren't able to express' while they were alive." The spectral Spirit Girls are said to have died tragically in the male-dominated music scene of the 1970s. The opening of the final film in the series, Eternity Forever, was held at the Mountain View Mausoleum in Altadena, CA, built with a gallery for temporary art exhibits. The opening also featured the living Spirit Girls, who played their final concert to 500 equally alive attendees.

Weber has also performed and recorded with The Party Boys (US-band) and The Perfect Me. She has two solo albums, Woman with Bass, 1994 and Cry for Happy, 1996, both recorded as "Marnie". In 2004, a compilation of her work was released entitled Songs Forgotten: The Best of Marnie 1987 - 2004.

In 2016 Weber released a feature-length film, The Day of Forevermore, which she wrote and directed and features her artwork.

She is married to the Los Angeles-based artist Jim Shaw.

Her work has been associated with New Gothic Art.

== Collections ==
- Museum of Contemporary Art, Los Angeles, CA, US
- Los Angeles County Museum of Art, Los Angeles, CA, US
- Neuberger Berman Inc., New York, NY, US
- Progressive Corporation, Mayfield, OH, US
- Fond National d'Art Contemporain (FNAC), FR
- MAMCO, Geneva, Switzerland
- Hammer Museum, Los Angeles
- Musée des beaux-arts La Chaux-de-Fonds, Switzerland
