= SYR3: Invito al ĉielo =

Studio album by Sonic Youth/Jim O'Rourke
- Released: March 2, 1998
- Recorded: 1997
- Length: 56:18
- Label: SYR
- Producer: Sonic Youth

Sonic Youth chronology
SYR2: Slaapkamers Met Slagroom (1997)	SYR3: Invito al ĉielo (1998)	A Thousand Leaves (1998)

Professional ratings
Review scores
Source	Rating
Allmusic	4/5 stars
Robert Christgau	(1-star Honorable Mention)
The Rolling Stone Album Guide	2.5/5 stars

SYR3: Invito al ĉielo is an album by American alternative rock band Sonic Youth. It was released on March 2, 1998, and was the third in a series of experimental releases issued on the band's own SYR label. SYR3 marked the beginning of the band's collaborations with producer and musician Jim O'Rourke; his continuing work with the group after SYR3 resulted in O'Rourke becoming an official member of Sonic Youth by 2002's Murray Street.

== Background ==
SYR3 followed the band's tradition of having the liner notes for SYR releases written in foreign languages, in this case, using Esperanto. "Invito al ĉielo" translates to "An Invitation to Heaven". However, the words that Kim Gordon sang were in English.

== Track listing ==
No.	Title	Length
1.	"Invito al ĉielo" ("An Invitation to Heaven")	20:54
2.	"Hungara vivo" ("Hungarian Life")	6:16
3.	"Radio-amatoroj" ("Radio Amateurs")	29:21

== Personnel ==
Sonic Youth

- Thurston Moore – vocals, guitar
- Kim Gordon – vocals, bass
- Lee Ranaldo – vocals, guitar
- Steve Shelley – drums
- Jim O'Rourke – bass

Technical

- Wharton Tiers – engineering
- Greg Calbi – mastering
- KPG (Kevin Gray) – mastering
