= The Eternal (album) =

Studio album by Sonic Youth
- Released: June 9, 2009
- Recorded: November–December 2008 in Hoboken, New Jersey
- Genres: Indie rock; experimental rock
- Length: 56:25
- Label: Matador
- Producer: John Agnello

Sonic Youth chronology
SYR8: Andre Sider Af Sonic Youth (2008)	The Eternal (2009)	SYR9: Simon Werner a disparu (2011)

Sonic Youth studio album chronology
Rather Ripped (2006)	The Eternal (2009)

Singles from The Eternal
- 1. "Sacred Trickster" Released: April 9, 2009; 2. "Antenna" Released: July 9, 2009

The Eternal is the fifteenth and final studio album by American rock band Sonic Youth, released on June 9, 2009, by Matador Records (the band's only release on that label). It was their first studio album in three years (since Rather Ripped), making it the band's longest gap between studio albums.

The Eternal was the band's highest-charting album of their career in the United States, peaking at No. 18 on the Billboard 200.

== Background ==
After Rather Ripped (2006), the band's contract with Geffen Records had expired and the two parties decided to go their separate ways. At the same time, Jim O'Rourke was gradually replaced with Pavement bassist Mark Ibold. Bassist Kim Gordon suggested recruiting him for live shows after having played with him in Free Kitten. Frontman Thurston Moore found that Ibold "immediately locked in, and had really prepared himself to the point where he knew the songs better than we did".

== Recording ==
When the band decided to record, it seemed natural to include Ibold. The process involved rehearsing the songs during the week in the basement of Moore and Gordon's house and subsequently recording them over the weekend. Shelley recalled, "It was like having a different project every week [and] it felt like we were doing a single every weekend. You kind of have to keep on your feet, the speed aspect to this album was very enjoyable". Eventually the band signed with Matador in 2008.

However, the band had begun writing much of the material before changing record labels. On the pop-rock aspects of the album, Moore noted, "I can sort of see a relationship between some of The Eternal and Dirty in terms of the dynamic". He argued that the band "definitely wanted to make songs as opposed to doing an avant-garde opus". On the choice of Matador, he explained that "we decided that they're a really strong song-supportive label". Ranaldo noted how they found inspiration in their earlier recordings on Daydream Nation, which "had an energy that we'd kind of forgotten about, and some of that energy and the experience of doing those songs impacted on the new record."

== Content ==
The cover art was painted by John Fahey.

The album was dedicated to Ron Asheton of the Stooges.

== Release ==
The Eternal was released on June 9, 2009, by record label Matador. The album was released digitally, on CD and as a double vinyl LP, in both a standard and a "Buy Early Get Now" (BEGN) edition.

In 2009, the album was awarded a silver certification from the Independent Music Companies Association, denoting sales in excess of 30,000 copies across Europe.

== Reception ==
Professional ratings
Aggregate scores
Source	Rating
AnyDecentMusic?	7.7/10
Metacritic	79/100
Review scores
Source	Rating
AllMusic	4/5 stars
The A.V. Club	B+
Entertainment Weekly	B−
The Guardian	4/5 stars
Los Angeles Times	4/4 stars
MSN Music (Consumer Guide)	A−
NME	8/10
Pitchfork	6.8/10
Rolling Stone	4/5 stars
Spin	8/10

The Eternal holds an approval rating of 79 out of 100 on review aggregator Metacritic, indicating "generally favorable reviews". An early review by Clash said "the album shows signs of life and heart-wrenching vitality that secures its makers’ position at the forefront of American rock music". In a "Critic's Choice" review for The New York Times, Ben Ratliff compared the album to two of their albums from the 1990s, Washing Machine and A Thousand Leaves; he pointed out that the album demonstrated Kim Gordon's continued rise as a singer, saying that she "sings all the best stuff" on The Eternal, particularly the album's last song, "Massage the History", a song he called the "record's sleeper stunner".

Many reviews were positive: musicOMH gave the album 5 of 5 stars and said that it "acts as a fitting and timeless aide-memoire of everything this mighty band has ever achieved." Los Angeles Times gave it 4 of 4 stars and said, "The music remains ageless and weird, fueled on chaos and clarity, but these are songs, not sound experiments for their own sake". Chicago Tribune gave the album 3.5 out of 4 stars and said: "Back on an independent label after nearly two decades with a major, the post-punk quartet returns to its '80s foundation with an album that breaks little new ground, but sounds thrilling all the same. [...] It casts aside some of the band's fondness for the warped digression and simply moves from one thrill ride to the next, rarely pausing for breath". The A.V. Club gave it a B+ and said that the songs "are more conventionally rock-oriented than any in Sonic Youth's career, yet the album doesn't really sound like a departure".

Other reviews were very average: The Austin Chronicle gave it a score of 3.5 stars out of 5 and said, "The three-guitar interplay, moderated by bassist Mark Ibold and Steve Shelley on drums, is confident if briefly indulgent ('Walkin Blue'), but Sonic Youth reigns in those tendencies for the most part, making The Eternal its most straightforward album yet". Yahoo! Music UK gave the album 6 of 10 stars and said it was "well-built, yes, but almost too well built, many parts sounding like they've been lifted directly from SY's vast back catalogue and slotted into place, like a jigsaw that needed completing, rather than the sprawling documents of noise and confusion this band's name is built upon". Tiny Mix Tapes gave it 3 of 5 stars and said the album was "accessible, listenable, and all the rest: another consistent album from the consistent rock band Sonic Youth".

== Track listing ==
All tracks are written by Sonic Youth.

No.	Title	Vocals	Length
1.	"Sacred Trickster"	Gordon	2:11
2.	"Anti-Orgasm"	Gordon and Moore	6:08
3.	"Leaky Lifeboat (For Gregory Corso)"	Gordon and Moore	3:32
4.	"Antenna"	Moore (background vocals: Ranaldo)	6:13
5.	"What We Know"	Ranaldo	3:54
6.	"Calming the Snake"	Gordon	3:35
7.	"Poison Arrow"	Moore (background vocals: Gordon and Ranaldo)	3:43
8.	"Malibu Gas Station"	Gordon	5:39
9.	"Thunderclap for Bobby Pyn"	Moore	2:38
10.	"No Way"	Moore	3:52
11.	"Walkin Blue"	Ranaldo	5:21
12.	"Massage the History"	Gordon	9:43
Total length:			56:25

iTunes pre-order exclusive bonus track
No.	Title	Length
13.	"Burning Shame"	3:54

Japanese and Brazilian bonus tracks
No.	Title	Length
13.	"Pay No Mind" (Beck cover)	3:04
14.	"No Garage"	3:48

== Personnel ==
Adapted from the album booklet.

Sonic Youth

- Kim Gordon – vocals, guitar, production, album back cover
- Mark Ibold – bass, production
- Thurston Moore – vocals, guitar, production
- Lee Ranaldo – vocals, guitar, production
- Steve Shelley – drums, percussion, production

Technical

- John Agnello – production, recording, mixing
- Greg Calbi – mastering
- Aaron Mullan – recording
- Justin Pizzoferrato – recording assistant
- James Frazee – mixing assistant
- Ted Young – ProTools engineer
- John Fahey – album front cover
- John Moloney – gatefold design
- Clarence Major – inner sleeve 1 design
- Gene Moore – inner sleeve 1 design
- Jutta Koether – inner sleeve 2 design
- Danny Fields – inner sleeve 2 design
- Cody Ranaldo – sleeve photography

== Charts ==
Chart performance for The Eternal
Chart (2009)	Peak position
Australian Albums (ARIA)	52
Belgian Albums (Ultratop Flanders)	9
Belgian Albums (Ultratop Wallonia)	39
Canadian Albums (Nielsen SoundScan)	32
Dutch Albums (Album Top 100)	90
Dutch Alternative Albums (Alternative Top 30)	4
Finnish Albums (Suomen virallinen lista)	34
French Albums (SNEP)	19
German Albums (Offizielle Top 100)	29
Irish Albums (IRMA)	46
Italian Albums (FIMI)	72
New Zealand Albums (RMNZ)	38
Norwegian Albums (VG-lista)	17
Scottish Albums (Official Charts)	39
Spanish Albums (Promusicae)	69
Swedish Albums (Sverigetopplistan)	28
Swiss Albums (Schweizer Hitparade)	31
UK Albums (Official Charts)	42
UK Independent Albums (Official Charts)	2
US Billboard 200	18
US Independent Albums (Billboard)	3
US Top Alternative Albums (Billboard)	6
US Top Rock Albums (Billboard)	7
US Top Tastemaker Albums (Billboard)	1
