= Rather Ripped =

Studio album by Sonic Youth
- Released: June 13, 2006
- Recorded: December 2005 – January 2006
- Studio: Sear Sound, New York City
- Genre: Alternative rock
- Length: 51:53
- Label: Geffen
- Producer: Sonic Youth; John Agnello

Sonic Youth chronology
SYR6: Koncertas Stan Brakhage prisiminimui (2005)	Rather Ripped (2006)	The Destroyed Room: B-Sides and Rarities (2006)

Sonic Youth studio album chronology
Sonic Nurse (2004)	Rather Ripped (2006)	The Eternal (2009)

Singles from Rather Ripped
- 1. "Incinerate" Released: 2006

Rather Ripped is the fourteenth studio album by American rock band Sonic Youth, released on June 13, 2006, by Geffen Records. It was the band's first album since 1998's A Thousand Leaves to feature their classic quartet formation, following the departure of multi-instrumentalist Jim O'Rourke, who had joined as a fifth member in 1999. Unlike its immediate predecessors, the album was produced by John Agnello and recorded at Sear Sound in New York City, the same studio where the band's 1994 album, Experimental Jet Set, Trash and No Star, was recorded. It also completed Sonic Youth's contract with Geffen, which released the band's previous eight records.

Rather Ripped is considered to be one of Sonic Youth's most accessible albums, featuring an abundance of concise songs dealing with melancholic topics such as adultery, sexual frustration, and infidelity. Upon its release, the album peaked at number 71 on the US Billboard 200 and number 64 on the UK Albums Chart. It received mostly positive reviews from critics, who praised its simpler, cleaner melodies and the vocal delivery of singer and bassist Kim Gordon. The album was ranked number 12 in The Village Voice's 2006 Pazz & Jop critics' poll. Its only single, "Incinerate", was released in 2006, alongside an accompanying music video directed by French director and writer Claire Denis.

== Background and recording ==
Rather Ripped is the follow-up to Sonic Youth's 2004 album Sonic Nurse and the band's first record after the departure of multi-instrumentalist Jim O'Rourke, who joined the group as a fifth member in 1999. According to guitarist Lee Ranaldo, O'Rourke left the band to pursue film work and other recording projects. His departure affected the sound of Rather Ripped, with singer and guitarist Thurston Moore stating that the new record "is just a far more straight up rock and roll album", in contrast to the "darker, twisted, complex quality" of O'Rourke's contributions. Partially inspired by the streamlined approach taken by Blondie for their 1978 commercial breakthrough Parallel Lines, Moore decided to write simpler songs "for everybody to plug into immediately." While he conceded Parallel Lines features some "super good" songs, he was disappointed with the album's poppier style and Mike Chapman's production when it was released. Nevertheless, he recognized that Parallel Lines became Blondie's breakthrough with the general public, and aimed to make Rather Ripped into Sonic Youth's version of Parallel Lines. The album's working titles were "Sonic Life" and "Do You Believe in Rapture?". The name "Rather Ripped" came from a Berkeley, California record store that later moved to Pittsburgh, Pennsylvania.

Unlike its immediate predecessors, which were recorded at the band's own Echo Canyon studio in Lower Manhattan, Rather Ripped was recorded at Sear Sound in New York City from December 2005 to January 2006, where their 1994 album Experimental Jet Set, Trash and No Star was also recorded. The album was quickly produced and much of the material was not reworked due to the band's limited time in the studio. During the recording sessions, Moore's gear included two Fender Jazzmasters and a Fender Princeton. Ranaldo, on the other hand, played a Gibson Les Paul guitar for half of the album and used his Fender Telecaster Deluxe, a "Jazzmaster copy" made by Saul Koll, and a modified Fender Jazzmaster with humbuckers for the remaining tracks, mainly through a modified Fender Super Reverb. Moore noted that the album featured more guitars plugged into the mixer with no guitar amplifier in the signal chain than was typical on previous Sonic Youth albums. The band chose John Agnello as the album's engineer due to his work with Don Fleming on albums by Screaming Trees in the early 1990s. He was recommended by fellow musician J Mascis of Dinosaur Jr., who had worked with Agnello for years. Additional work was done in early 2006 at Echo Canyon and J Mascis's Bisquiteen studio in Amherst, Massachusetts. The album was mastered by Greg Calbi at Sterling Sound in New York City in March 2006.

== Composition ==
=== Musical style ===
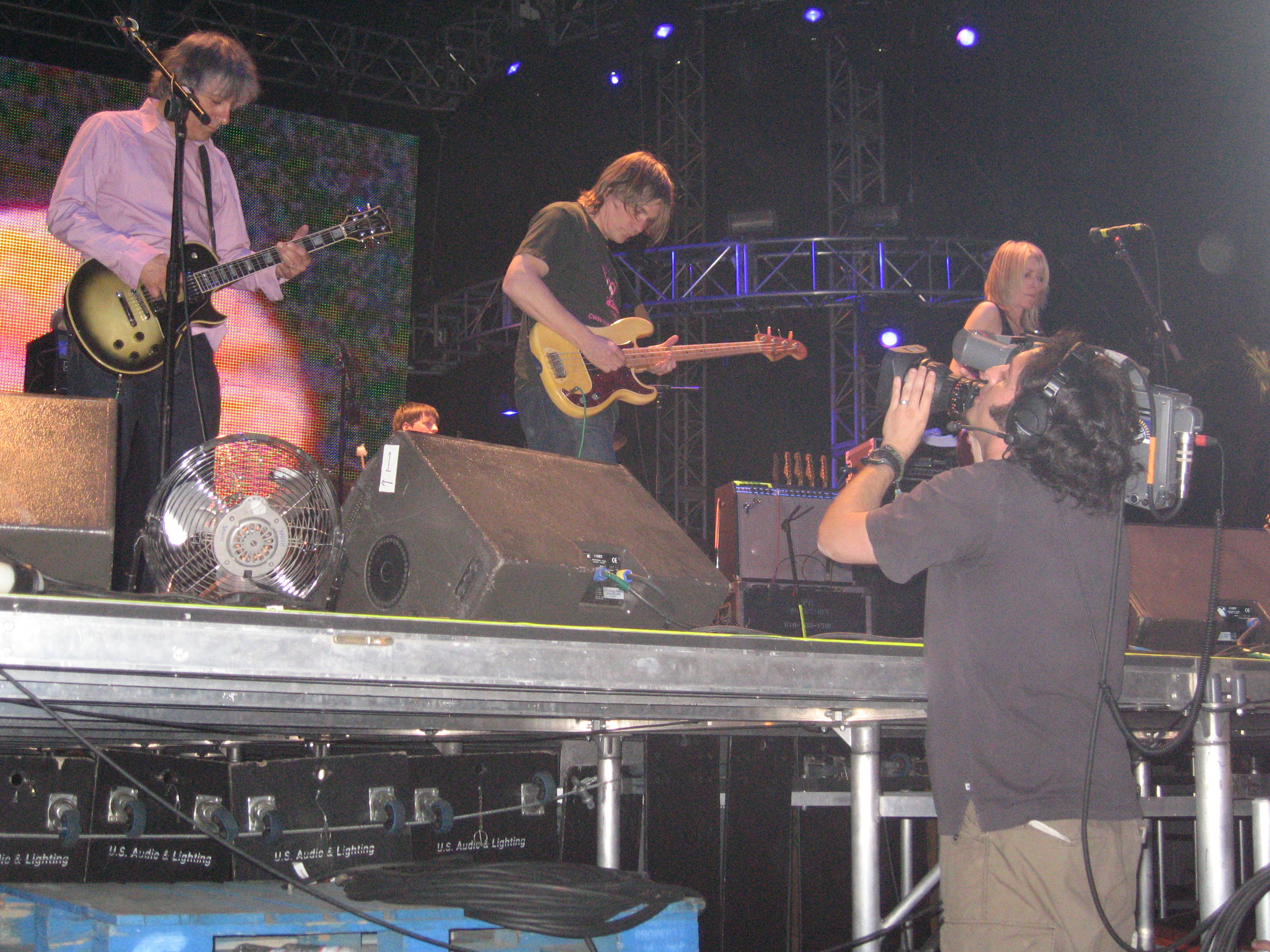
Sonic Youth performing at the Coachella Music Festival in 2007

Rather Ripped is generally considered one of the band's most accessible albums, featuring an abundance of concise and catchy melodies. Moore described it as "a super song record" that contains "rockers and ballads". In addition, seven of the album's 12 tracks have a duration of less than four minutes, a feature that is uncommon in previous Sonic Youth releases. The album generally favors guitar textures over feedback or noise, which typically characterized the band's earlier works. Dave Heaton of PopMatters remarked that the guitars on Rather Ripped are joined to form a vibrant and mysterious sound, stating that "it often feels like Sonic Youth are taking all the instrumental tricks they've learned over the years and putting them in the service of building a lasting landscape of guitar sounds, one that reverberates with the sounds of the past but also feels eternally youthful".

=== Lyrical themes ===
Lyrically, Rather Ripped deals with melancholic topics about adultery, sexual frustration and infidelity. In the opening track, "Reena", whose working title was "Stonesy", singer and bassist Kim Gordon is involved in a secondary relationship with a woman. Lead single "Incinerate" is built on a conventional love-as-fire metaphor, while "What a Waste" attributes sexual lust. "Pink Steam", which is the longest track of the album, features a lengthy instrumental part that was described as "gorgeously windswept and violently romantic". Its title was taken from a book by San Francisco author Dodie Bellamy. The song "Do You Believe in Rapture?" is a political reflection on Christians in the office, while "Rats", which is the only song on the album written by Ranaldo, was described as a "fulfilling ghost-narrative". The album ends with the semi-acoustic ballad "Or", which starts with strip-club imagery and ends with Moore recounting various interview-like questions such as "What comes first? The music or the words?"

== Release ==
Rather Ripped was released on June 13, 2006, and completed Sonic Youth's contract with major label Geffen Records, which also released the band's previous eight albums. The UK edition of the album includes two outtakes, "Helen Lundeberg" and "Eyeliner", which were previously released as a 7" single on the band's own label, Sonic Youth Records. To promote the album, the band embarked on a tour across the United States, starting at New York's famed CBGB on June 13, 2006, where the band had not performed since 1992, and ending at the Bank of America Pavilion in Boston on September 3, 2006. Bassist Mark Ibold, formerly of the indie rock band Pavement, joined the band as part of the touring group.

Upon release, Rather Ripped peaked at No. 71 on the US Billboard 200 chart and No. 64 on the UK Albums Chart. The album also charted in other countries, including Australia, Belgium, Finland, France and Norway. The song "Incinerate" was released as a single in France and Australia in 2006. Additionally, five music videos, one for "Incinerate" and four for "Jams Run Free", were directed by French director and writer Claire Denis. The video for "Incinerate" is a performance of the band that was recorded at Le Nouveau Casino in Paris prior to their 2006 tour in support of the album, while the others are set in an apartment and repeat images of cats, roofing tiles and TV antennas. The videos were shot with a consumer-grade digital video camera and feature a dissolving image resolution and fluctuating color palette.

== Critical reception ==
Professional ratings
Aggregate scores
Source	Rating
Metacritic	82/100
Review scores
Source	Rating
AllMusic	4/5 stars
The A.V. Club	A−
Entertainment Weekly	B+
The Guardian	4/5 stars
Los Angeles Times	3/4 stars
NME	7/10
Pitchfork	7.5/10
Rolling Stone	4/5 stars
Spin	2/5 stars
Toronto Star	4/4 stars

Rather Ripped received widespread acclaim from critics. In a review for the Toronto Star, Ben Rayner wrote that the band managed to condense all their expansive musical style into tighter songs "without sacrificing the mercurial structures, subversive lyrical bent and reverence for noise that identify Sonic Youth as Sonic Youth". PopMatters editor Dave Heaton believed the album was a graceful and elegant way to end Sonic Youth's unique relationship with Geffen, describing it as a "cohesive story about a band seeking the best way to take the reckless, brave spirits of free jazz, punk, and experimental music, and generate them within the confines of traditional rock song structure". He also praised Moore's lyrics, stating that "his Beat-style poetry is especially evocative, and especially terse—a quality that fits well with an album that musically seems to be doing much the same, communicating a lot with a little". Similarly, Dave Simpson of The Guardian felt that the band reinvented themselves with poppier songs, calling Rather Ripped "an extraordinary state of affairs in Sonic Youth's 25th year".

Writing for Rolling Stone, Rob Sheffield highlighted Moore's guitar playing for giving the album "a sense of emotional urgency" and considered "Incinerate" and "Pink Steam" some of the album's highlights. Gordon's vocal delivery was widely praised, with Ben Ratliff of The New York Times comparing it favorably to The Velvet Underground singer and collaborator Nico. Robert Christgau also remarked that Gordon sounds "breathlessly girlish" despite being 53 at the time, and that both she and Moore "evoke visions of dalliance, displacement, recrimination, and salvation that never become unequivocally literal". He gave the album an "A" in his consumer guide review for Rhapsody. Sheffield concluded that the album features her first worthwhile songs in a decade.

Steve Hochman of Los Angeles Times credited the album's catchy melodies for being smartly and effectively handled, commenting that "it almost makes you wonder what would have happened if Television and Peter Frampton had worked together". Tom Sinclair of Entertainment Weekly wrote that, although the band "can still knock out a noisy punk stomper when the mood strikes" like on the track "Sleepin Around", the cleaner and quieter melodies are the ones that "really rip up your emotions". Slant Magazine's Jimmy Newlin stated similar pros, noting that "quiet is the new loud", and felt that the band's shift towards romantic poignancy was "a welcome growth as the band advances well into its second decade of existence".

Other reviews were less enthusiastic. Spin editor Joe Gross criticized Rather Ripped for its lack of expansive songs, stating that the album "is about three- or four-minute songcraft—never the highlight of their résumé, even when [Gordon] lends her singular rasp". Brandon Stosuy of Pitchfork felt that the second half of the album was weaker than the first and criticized the lyrics of the closer "Or". AllMusic reviewer Heather Phares remarked that the band's playing can occasionally outpace their songwriting, but nevertheless judged Rather Ripped as "a solidly good album" that "shows that Sonic Youth is still in a comfortable yet creative groove, not a rut". Rather Ripped was ranked 12th in The Village Voice's 2006 Pazz & Jop critics' poll and 13th in The Wire's annual critics' poll. Rolling Stone editors ranked the album third on their Top 50 Albums of 2006 list, while Pitchfork ranked it 43rd on a similar list.

== Track listing ==
All lyrics by Thurston Moore except "Reena" and "The Neutral" by Kim Gordon, "What a Waste" by Kim Gordon and Thurston Moore, and "Rats" by Lee Ranaldo.

All tracks are written by Sonic Youth

No.	Title	Vocals	Length
1.	"Reena"	Gordon	3:47
2.	"Incinerate"	Moore	4:55
3.	"Do You Believe in Rapture?"	Moore	3:11
4.	"Sleepin Around"	Moore	3:42
5.	"What a Waste"	Gordon	3:33
6.	"Jams Run Free"	Gordon	3:52
7.	"Rats"	Ranaldo	4:24
8.	"Turquoise Boy"	Gordon	6:14
9.	"Lights Out"	Moore	3:32
10.	"The Neutral"	Gordon	4:09
11.	"Pink Steam"	Moore	6:57
12.	"Or"	Moore	3:31
Total length:			51:53

== Personnel ==
Credits are adapted from the album's liner notes.

Sonic Youth

- Thurston Moore – vocals, guitar, bass on "Rats", production, sleeve design
- Kim Gordon – vocals, bass, guitar on "Rats", production
- Lee Ranaldo – guitar, vocals, production, additional recording
- Steve Shelley – drums, production

Design personnel

- Christopher Wool – sleeve artwork
- Amanda de Cadenet – band photography
- JP Robinson – front cover design
- Brandy Flower – sleeve design

Technical personnel

- John Agnello – production, mixing, additional recording
- TJ Doherty – recording
- Aaron Mullan – assistant engineer, additional recording
- Chris Allen – assistant engineer
- Anthony Fontana – assistant engineer
- Don Fleming – additional vocal production
- Greg Calbi – mastering

== Charts ==
Chart performance for Rather Ripped
Chart (2006)	Peak position
Australian Albums (ARIA)	40
Belgian Albums (Ultratop Flanders)	20
Belgian Albums (Ultratop Wallonia)	54
Canadian Albums (Nielsen SoundScan)	78
Finnish Albums (Suomen virallinen lista)	40
French Albums (SNEP)	25
German Albums (Offizielle Top 100)	79
Norwegian Albums (VG-lista)	13
Scottish Albums (Official Charts)	51
Swedish Albums (Sverigetopplistan)	46
Swiss Albums (Schweizer Hitparade)	59
UK Albums (Official Charts)	64
US Billboard 200	71
US Top Tastemaker Albums (Billboard)	3
