= Silver Session for Jason Knuth =

EP by Sonic Youth
- Released: July 14, 1998
- Recorded: 1998
- Genre: Experimental; noise
- Length: 29:43
- Label: Sonic Knuth
- Producer: Sonic Youth

Sonic Youth chronology
A Thousand Leaves (1998)	Silver Session for Jason Knuth (1998)	SYR4: Goodbye 20th Century (1999)

Silver Session for Jason Knuth is an EP by American alternative rock band Sonic Youth. It was released in 1998, credited to record label Sonic Knuth.

== Content ==
The EP's eight tracks consist entirely of guitar feedback with occasional drum machine.

It was dedicated to Sonic Youth fan Jason Knuth, who committed suicide, with proceeds from the record's sales donated to the San Francisco Suicide Prevention Hotline. The liner notes, written by Thurston Moore, contained an explanation of the record:

Silver Sessions [was] taken from an evening when SY had to do vocal overdubs for A Thousand Leaves – the band upstairs was hammering out some funky metal overdrive and we couldn't "sing" properly (?!). We decided to fight fire with molten lava and turned every amp we owned on to 10+ and leaned as many guitars and basses we could plug in against them and they roared/howled like airplanes burning over the pacific [sic]. We could only enter the playing room with hands pressed hard against our ears, and even then it was physically stunning. We ran a sick, outmoded beatbox through the P.A. and it blew out horrendous distorted pulsations. Of course, we recorded the whole thing, and a few months later we mixed it down into sections, ultra-processing it to a wholly other "piece". In a way, it's my favorite record of ours – I hope Jason [Knuth, to whom the release is dedicated] digs it. Keep on, keep on, keep on.

== Critical reception ==
Professional ratings
Review scores
Source	Rating
AllMusic	3.5/5 stars
The Rolling Stone Album Guide	1/5 stars

Jason Birchmeier of AllMusic wrote, "Of the many strange recordings released by Sonic Youth over the course of their long career, few measure up to Silver Session for Jason Knuth". Describing Silver Session as noise rock, he called it "an interesting addition to their catalog, intended mainly for loyal fans."

== Track listing ==
All tracks are written by Sonic Youth

No.	Title	Length
1.	"Silver Panties"	4:27
2.	"Silver Breeze"	1:19
3.	"Silver Flower"	4:48
4.	"Silver Wax Lips"	4:20
5.	"Silver Loop"	4:25
6.	"Silver Shirt"	7:17
7.	"Silver Son"	1:43
8.	"Silver Mirror"	2:44
