= SYR7: J'Accuse Ted Hughes =

Studio album / Live album by Sonic Youth
- Released: April 22, 2008
- Recorded: April 8, 2000 and 2003
- Genre: Noise rock
- Length: 41:08
- Label: SYR
- Producer: Sonic Youth

SYR series chronology
SYR6: Koncertas Stan Brakhage prisiminimui (2005)	SYR7: J'Accuse Ted Hughes (2008)	SYR8: Andre Sider af Sonic Youth (2008)

Sonic Youth chronology
The Destroyed Room: B-Sides and Rarities (2006)	SYR7: J'Accuse Ted Hughes (2008)	Hits Are for Squares (2008)

Professional ratings
Review scores
Source	Rating
The A.V. Club	B−
Blurt	6/10 stars
MOG	7.5/10
The Rolling Stone Album Guide	2/5 stars

SYR7: J'Accuse Ted Hughes is the seventh release in American group Sonic Youth's SYR series. It was released only on vinyl—the first in the series to receive no compact disc release—and featured two songs: "J'Accuse Ted Hughes", and "Agnès B. Musique". It consists of an improvised piece performed live during the band's April 8, 2000 performance at the first All Tomorrow's Parties festival, followed by an unused soundtrack for an Agnes B. fashion show.

SYR7 followed the SYR series tradition of liner notes in foreign languages, in this case, Arpitan, a French regional language. The cover art comes from a negative Melody Maker review of the band's ATP performance, referencing previous SYR record Goodbye 20th Century with the headline "Goodbye 20th Century, goodbye talent!"

== Track listing ==
No.	Title	Length
1.	"J'Accuse Ted Hughes"	22:53
2.	"Agnès B Musique"	18:15
