= Sunday (Sonic Youth song) =

Single by Sonic Youth

from the album A Thousand Leaves
- B-side: "Moist Vagina", "Silver Panties", "Sunday (edit)"
- Released: April 1998
- Genre: Alternative rock
- Label: Geffen
- Songwriters: Kim Gordon, Thurston Moore, Lee Ranaldo, Steve Shelley

Sonic Youth singles chronology
"Little Trouble Girl" (1996)	"Sunday" (1998)	"Incinerate" (2006)

"Sunday" is a song by American alternative rock band Sonic Youth from their tenth studio album, A Thousand Leaves (1998). It was released in April 1998 by Geffen Records as the only single from the album.

== Release ==
"Sunday" was released in April 1998 by Geffen Records as the only single from their tenth studio album, A Thousand Leaves (1998). It reached number 72 in the UK Singles Chart.

A different recording of the song was also featured on the soundtrack of the film SubUrbia.

== Content ==
The song's riff was 'borrowed' from Helium's song "Skeleton".

One of the single's B-sides, "Moist Vagina", was originally by Nirvana, who were friends of the band and appeared in the film 1991: The Year Punk Broke while touring with Sonic Youth.

== Music video ==
The video for "Sunday" was directed by Harmony Korine and starred Macaulay Culkin and Rachel Miner. The video made liberal use of slow- and fast-motion cameras and images of ballerinas dancing, Culkin and Thurston Moore playing banjos, and Culkin interacting with Miner.

== Track listing ==
1. "Sunday" (LP Version) – 4:52
2. "Moist Vagina" – 3:04 (Kurt Cobain)
3. "Silver Panties" – 4:27
4. "Sunday (Edit)" – 3:15

== Chart positions ==
Chart performance for "Sunday"
Chart (1998)	Peak position
UK Singles (Official Charts)	72
UK Rock & Metal (Official Charts)	1

== Release history ==
Release dates and formats for "Sunday"
Region	Date	Format(s)	Label(s)	Ref.
United States	April 1998	college radio; modern rock radio; public radio	Geffen	
United Kingdom	June 29, 1998	7-inch vinyl; CD	Geffen	
