= SYR2: Slaapkamers met slagroom =

EP by Sonic Youth
- Released: September 2, 1997
- Recorded: 1997
- Length: 28:30
- Label: SYR
- Producer: Sonic Youth

Sonic Youth chronology
SYR1: Anagrama (1997)	SYR2: Slaapkamers met slagroom (1997)	SYR3: Invito al ĉielo (1998)

Professional ratings
Review scores
Source	Rating
AllMusic	3/5 stars
Robert Christgau	(neither)
The Rolling Stone Album Guide	2.5/5 stars

SYR2: Slaapkamers met slagroom is an EP by American alternative rock band Sonic Youth. It was released on 12" vinyl on September 2, 1997, and was the second in a series of experimental and mostly instrumental releases issued on the band's own SYR label.

== Background ==
SYR2 followed the band's tradition of having the liner notes of SYR releases written in foreign languages, in this case, Dutch. "Slaapkamers met slagroom" is Dutch for "bedrooms with whipped cream".

An error in the original production of the vinyl resulted in a small number of the initial pressings accidentally being on black vinyl. It is unknown how many of these were produced. After realizing this, the remaining production of the vinyl version was on clear blue vinyl.

An abbreviated version of the instrumental 17-minute title composition (with added vocals courtesy of Kim Gordon) appeared on the group's 1998 album A Thousand Leaves as the song "The Ineffable Me". Additionally, a melody from "Stil" was fleshed out to create the song "Snare, Girl", also from A Thousand Leaves.

== Track listing ==
All tracks are written by Sonic Youth (Thurston Moore, Kim Gordon, Lee Ranaldo, Steve Shelley).

No.	Title	Length
1.	"Slaapkamers met slagroom" ("Bedrooms with Whipped Cream")	17:39
2.	"Stil" ("Quiet")	7:25
3.	"Herinneringen" ("Memories")	3:26

== Personnel ==
Sonic Youth

- Thurston Moore
- Kim Gordon
- Lee Ranaldo
- Steve Shelley

Technical

- Wharton Tiers – engineering
- Greg Calbi – mastering
- Chris Habib – sleeve design
