= SYR8: Andre Sider Af Sonic Youth =

2008 live album by Sonic Youth with Mats Gustafsson and Merzbow

SYR8: Andre Sider af Sonic Youth

Live album by Sonic Youth med Mats Gustafsson og Merzbow
- Released: July 28, 2008
- Recorded: July 1, 2005
- Genre: Experimental, noise rock
- Length: 57:32
- Label: SYR
- Producer: Sonic Youth

SYR series chronology
SYR7: J'Accuse Ted Hughes (2008)	SYR8: Andre Sider af Sonic Youth (2008)	SYR9: Simon Werner a disparu (2011)

Sonic Youth chronology
Hits Are for Squares (2008)	SYR8: Andre Sider Af Sonic Youth (2008)	The Eternal (2009)

Professional ratings
Review scores
Source	Rating
Blurt	7/10 stars
MOG	8/10
Pitchfork	8.2/10
The Rolling Stone Album Guide	3/5 stars

SYR8: Andre Sider af Sonic Youth is a live album by Sonic Youth with Mats Gustafsson and Merzbow. It was the eighth release in the SYR series. It was released on July 28, 2008. The album was recorded on July 1, 2005 at the Roskilde Festival. The album title is in Danish and means "Other sides of Sonic Youth".

== Track listing ==
No.	Title	Length
1.	"Andre Sider af Sonic Youth"	57:32

Notes

- Recorded live at Roskilde Festival, July 1, 2005
- Mixed at Studio Concord, 2006
- Mastered at Golden Mastering

== Personnel ==
Credits were adapted from the album's liner notes.

Sonic Youth

- Kim Gordon – guitar, vocals
- Thurston Moore – guitar
- Jim O'Rourke – bass
- Lee Ranaldo – guitar
- Steve Shelley – drums, percussion

Additional musicians

- Mats Gustafsson – winds
- Merzbow – laptop

Technical

- Barok Films – recording
- Jim O'Rourke – mixing
- Aaron Mullan – live sound
- Jørgen Teller – translation
- John Golden – mastering

Design personnel

- Chris Habib – graphic design
- Lee Ranaldo & Eric Barcht – photos
