= SYR1: Anagrama =

EP by Sonic Youth
- Released: May 1997
- Recorded: 1997
- Length: 22:35
- Label: SYR
- Producer: Sonic Youth

Sonic Youth chronology
Washing Machine (1995)	SYR1: Anagrama (1997)	SYR2: Slaapkamers met slagroom (1997)

Professional ratings
Review scores
Source	Rating
AllMusic	4/5 stars
Robert Christgau	B+
Pitchfork	7.6/10
Rolling Stone	positive
The Rolling Stone Album Guide	3/5 stars

SYR1: Anagrama is an EP by American alternative rock band Sonic Youth. It was released in May 1997, and was the first in a series of experimental and mostly instrumental releases issued on the band's own SYR label.

== Background ==
The liner notes for Anagrama were written in French, starting a tradition of having the liner notes of SYR releases written in foreign languages.

== Track listing ==
No.	Title	Length
1.	"Anagrama"	9:31
2.	"Improvisation Ajoutée" ("Extra Improvisation")	2:54
3.	"Tremens" ([from Latin]: "Trembling")	3:22
4.	"Mieux: De Corrosion" ("Better: Of Corrosion")	6:54

== Personnel ==
Sonic Youth

- Thurston Moore – guitar
- Kim Gordon – bass
- Lee Ranaldo – guitar
- Steve Shelley – drums

Technical

- Wharton Tiers – engineering
- Greg Calbi – mastering
