= SYR5 =

ミュージカル パ一スペクティブ
- The Japanese katakana on the CD face is a phonetic translation of the words "Musical Perspective"

Studio album by Kim Gordon, DJ Olive and Ikue Mori
- Released: August 29, 2000
- Recorded: 2000 at Tribeca Recording Center
- Genre: Free improvisation, experimental, noise rock
- Length: 48:44
- Label: SYR
- Producer: Jim O'Rourke

Kim Gordon, DJ Olive and Ikue Mori chronology
NYC Ghosts & Flowers (2000)	ミュージカル パ一スペクティブ (2000)	In the Fishtank 9 (2001)

ミュージカル パ一スペクティブ (Myūjikaru pāsupekutibu), (Musical Perspectives) (known as SYR5) is a studio album by Kim Gordon, DJ Olive and Ikue Mori. It was released on August 29, 2000, by record label SYR, and was the fifth entry in the SYR series, despite not featuring Sonic Youth as a whole.

== Background ==
Following the tradition of having the liner notes of SYR releases written in foreign languages, the notes for SYR5 were written in Japanese. The Japanese title means "Musical Perspectives", a name that also appears in different languages on other SYR releases.

It was recorded at Tribeca Recording Center, which is Gordon's preferred name for Sonic Youth's Echo Canyon studios.

AllMusic described the music as "ultra-abstract and mood-driven, filling the listening space with a dark ambience constructed by Olive's incredibly resonant choice of samples and Mori's carefully tweaked bleeps."

== Track listing ==
No.	Title	Length
1.	"Olive's Horn"	4:22
2.	"International Spy"	2:41
3.	"Neu Adult"	2:35
4.	"Paperbag / Orange Laptop"	6:18
5.	"Stuck on Gum"	4:05
6.	"Fried Mushroom"	8:25
7.	"What Do You Want? (Kim)"	3:55
8.	"Lemonade"	6:38
9.	"We Are the Princesses"	3:36
10.	"Take Me Back"	4:25
11.	"Take It to the Hit"	7:32

== Critical reception ==
Professional ratings
Review scores
Source	Rating
AllMusic	4/5 stars
Pitchfork	3.2/10

AllMusic noted that while the lyrics "dance the line between abstract poetry and frustrating downtown pretentiousness", this is made up for by "the utterly weird and compelling soundscapes the group creates – a true headphone head trip." Pitchfork panned the album, giving it a grade of 3.2/10 and commenting, "This record leaves me sad and blank."

== Personnel ==
- Kim Gordon
- DJ Olive
- Ikue Mori

Technical

- Jim O'Rourke – mixing
- Wharton Tiers – recording
- Steve Fallone – mastering
- Chris Habib – sleeve graphics
