= The Whitey Album =

Studio album by Ciccone Youth
- Released: January, 1989
- Recorded: 1986–1988
- Genre: Experimental
- Length: 53:56
- Label: Enigma; Blast First
- Producer: Sonic Youth

Sonic Youth chronology
Daydream Nation (1988)	The Whitey Album (1989)	Goo (1990)

Singles from The Whitey Album
- 1. "Into the Groovey" Released: 1986

The Whitey Album is an album by Ciccone Youth, a side project of Sonic Youth members Steve Shelley, Kim Gordon, Lee Ranaldo and Thurston Moore, featuring contributions from Minutemen/Firehose member Mike Watt and J Mascis of Dinosaur Jr.

== 1986 Ciccone Youth single ==
Following the death of best friend and bandmate D. Boon, Mike Watt was suffering from depression. After driving to the East Coast with girlfriend Kira Roessler who was starting an internship at Yale, Watt went to New York City and stayed with Gordon and Moore. He also spent time with Sonic Youth during the EVOL sessions. Watt played bass on two songs recorded in those sessions, "In the Kingdom #19" and the band's cover of "Bubblegum". As part of an effort to encourage Watt to begin playing music again, the Ciccone Youth project was conceived.

In 1986, a 7-inch single was released in the U.S. on New Alliance Records under the name of Ciccone Youth with Mike Watt performing Madonna's "Burning Up" on Side A with an altered title of "Burnin' Up". The name Ciccone Youth came from Madonna's legal name, Madonna Louise Ciccone. The song was recorded in California without Sonic Youth's participation. Mike Watt played all of the instruments except for the lead guitar part which was overdubbed by Greg Ginn after the initial track was recorded. Side AA consisted of two Sonic Youth songs recorded during the EVOL sessions, "Tough Titty Rap" and a cover of Madonna's "Into the Groove" which was titled "Into the Groovey". All three songs were credited to Ciccone Youth. Blast First would release the record the same year in Europe as a 12-inch single with the two Sonic Youth songs on Side A and Mike Watt's "Burnin' Up" as the B-side. "Into the Groovey" sold 8,000 copies in the U.K. due to play in dance clubs.

== Background and composition ==
Seeking a break from their own style of music at the conclusion of the Sister Tour, Sonic Youth returned to Wharton Tiers' studio and began recording songs for The Whitey Album. With the aid of a sampling device, the band created the songs in the studio. Unlike Sonic Youth's other albums, drum machines and samplers are the foundation of the recording. However, Sonic Youth's trademark dissonance and experimental methods still permeate throughout.

Although it is suggested through only a few songs, the album is somewhat a tongue-in-cheek tribute to Madonna and 1980s pop in general. Ahead of Madonna's 60th birthday in 2018, frontman Thurston Moore told The Guardian:

Madonna was actually in a couple of no-wave bands that nobody ever talks about. She was in a band [Spinal Root Gang] with these two twins, Dan and Josh Braun, who were the first members of Swans, Michael Gira's band. Nobody really knows about that part of her history; she was in a pre-Swans no wave band! There's all that interconnected history in New York with Madonna and the no wave scene. [...]

Eventually she started making really amazing dance records. "Into the Groove" was brilliant to the point where I thought it would be a great song to cover through the prism of Sonic Youth. Instantly fabulous. We took her record and put it on one of the channels in the studio and we would fade it into [our version of] the song once in a while, not thinking about the legalities of such a move. We made a single with Mike Watt from Minutemen on a label called New Alliance, a sub-label of Black Flag's SST Records ["Into the Groovey"]. We wanted to break down any kind of barrier that was being set up between the underground and the people who had graduated from it to the mainstream.

We actually embraced Madonna's joie de vivre, her celebrity. We did that record and everybody felt we were crazy, and some people lambasted us for giving her some kind of credibility in the underground. But she already had credibility, as far as I was concerned; she was already a part of the downtown scene. I don't think she capitalised on it.

"Tough Titty Rap" and "Into the Groovey" are the same versions as the ones that appeared on the single released two years earlier. However, Mike Watt's version of "Burnin' Up" is his four-track demo of the song, recorded prior to the version that appeared on the 1986 single. Recorded in his home, Watt sings and plays all instruments and it is his only contribution to the album.

The album includes a hip-hop version of "Making the Nature Scene" which is different from the original version which appeared on Confusion Is Sex. The second track, "(Silence)", is a titular one minute gap of silence intended as a tribute to John Cage. The cover of Robert Palmer's "Addicted to Love" was recorded by Gordon in a Karaoke booth; Gordon made the song's video at a make-your-own-video booth at Macy's.

Sonic Youth originally wanted to release the album simultaneously with Daydream Nation but were convinced to release the latter several months later by associates of the band.

Beside the single and The Whitey Album, Sonic Youth would also use the Ciccone name in the lyrics of the title song on the 1987 Master-Dik EP. Moore frequently announces "We're Ciccone" throughout the song. The track and the EP, however, were attributed to Sonic Youth.

== Artwork ==
According to the liner notes of the deluxe edition of Daydream Nation: "The album cover [of Ciccone Youth], a b&w xerox enlargement of Madonna's face, was a brilliant and contemporary design. Sonic Youth had employed found images on album covers before, but this was testing the limit. We sent copies of the vinyl album to Warners to be passed on to Madonna via her sister who worked in the art department there. Word came back that she had no problem with it acknowledging she remembered the band from her NYC Danceteria days".

== Reception ==
Professional ratings
Review scores
Source	Rating
AllMusic	4/5 stars
Chicago Tribune	3/4 stars
Entertainment Weekly	C+
Los Angeles Times	2.5/5 stars
Mojo	3/5 stars
NME	8/10
Pitchfork	7.8/10
Rolling Stone	4/5 stars
Select	4/5
The Village Voice	C

Trouser Press wrote "the joke doesn't translate, and the disc comes across as a self-indulgent mess".

== Track listing ==
All songs by Ciccone Youth, except where noted.

1. "Needle-Gun" – 2:27
2. (Silence) – 1:03
3. "G-Force" – 3:39
4. "Platoon II" – 4:18
5. "MacBeth" – 5:27
6. "Me & Jill/Hendrix Cosby" – 5:30
7. "Burnin' Up (Mike Watt Original Demo)" (Madonna) – 3:52
8. "Hi! Everybody" – 0:57
9. "Children of Satan/Third Fig" – 3:06
10. "Two Cool Rock Chicks Listening to Neu" (feat. J Mascis, guitar) – 2:56
11. "Addicted to Love" (Robert Palmer) – 3:45
12. "Moby-Dik" – 1:01
13. "March of the Ciccone Robots" – 1:57
14. "Making the Nature Scene" – 3:14
15. "Tuff Titty Rap" – 0:39
16. "Into the Groovey" (Madonna, Bray) – 4:36

CD reissue bonus track

17. "MacBeth (Alternate Mix)" – 5:17

== Personnel ==
Per the liner notes:

- The Royal Tuff Titty
- ss beat control
- The Sigh
- Fly Fly Away

Additional:

- J Mascis, guitar
- Suzanne Sasic, red head on "Two Cool Rock Chicks Listening to Neu"
- Wharton Tiers, engineer (1, 3–6, 8–15)
- Mike Watt, engineer ("Burnin' Up")
- Martin Bisi, engineer ("Into the Groovey")
- Howie Weinberg, mastering
