= Lights Out (2010 film) =

2010 film by Fabrice Gobert

- Theatrical release poster
- French: Simon Werner a disparu...
- Directed by: Fabrice Gobert
- Written by: Fabrice Gobert
- Produced by: Marc-Antoine Robert; Xavier Rigault
- Starring: Jules Pelissier; Ana Girardot; Arthur Mazet; Laurent Delbecque; Selma El Mouissi; Audrey Bastien; Esteban Carvajal Alegria; Yan Tassin; Serge Riaboukine; Laurent Capelluto
- Cinematography: Agnès Godard
- Edited by: Peggy Koretzky
- Music by: Sonic Youth
- Production company: 2.4.7. Films
- Distributed by: Diaphana Distribution
- Release dates: 20 May 2010 (Cannes); 22 September 2010 (France)
- Running time: 91 minutes
- Country: France
- Language: French
- Budget: €3.5 million
- Box office: $352,420

Lights Out (French: Simon Werner a disparu..., lit. 'Simon Werner Has Disappeared...') is a 2010 French thriller film written and directed by Fabrice Gobert and starring Jules Pelissier, Ana Girardot, Arthur Mazet, Laurent Delbecque, Selma El Mouissi, Audrey Bastien, Esteban Carvajal Alegria, Yan Tassin, Serge Riaboukine and Laurent Capelluto.

== Cast ==
- Jules Pelissier as Jérémie Legrand
- Ana Girardot as Alice Cartier
- Arthur Mazet as Jean-Baptiste Rabier
- Laurent Delbecque as Simon Werner
- Selma El Mouissi as Laetitia
- Audrey Bastien as Clara
- Esteban Carvajal Alegria as Luc
- Yan Tassin as Frédéric
- Serge Riaboukine as Rabier's father
- Laurent Capelluto as Yves

== Production ==
Principal photography took place from September to November 2009 in the Forest of Sénart near Tigery and at Lycée François Truffaut in Bondoufle.

== Release ==
The film had its world premiere in the Un Certain Regard section of the 2010 Cannes Film Festival.

== Reception ==
Lee Marshall of Screen Daily wrote, "This genre-bending high-school thriller-drama about three students who go missing at a French lycee opens like a teen B-movie, but soon moves into more intriguing territory." Jordan Mintzer of Variety called it "a deftly realized teen thriller" that is too similar to Elephant.

The film was nominated for Best First Feature Film at the 36th César Awards, but lost to Gainsbourg: A Heroic Life.

== Soundtrack ==
SYR9: Simon Werner a disparu

Soundtrack album by Sonic Youth
- Released: 15 February 2011
- Recorded: 2010
- Genre: Noise rock; post-rock
- Length: 58:08
- Label: Sonic Youth Recordings

SYR series chronology
| SYR8: Andre Sider Af Sonic Youth (2008) | SYR9: Simon Werner a disparu (2011) |

Sonic Youth chronology
| The Eternal (2009) | SYR9: Simon Werner a Disparu (2011) |

Professional ratings
Aggregate scores
| Source | Rating |
|---|---|
| Metacritic | 76/100 |
Review scores
| Source | Rating |
| AllMusic | 4/5 stars |
| Drowned in Sound | 6/10 |
| Mojo | 4/5 stars |
| No Ripcord | 9/10 |
| Pitchfork | 6.0/10 |
| PopMatters | 7/10 |
| Record Collector | 5/5 stars |
| Sputnikmusic | 3/5 |

The soundtrack was written and performed by American rock band Sonic Youth. It was released as part of the Sonic Youth Recordings series, under the title SYR9: Simon Werner a Disparu. It is the final release from the band before their breakup in November 2011.

=== Track listing ===
All tracks are written by Sonic Youth.

| No. | Title | Length |
|---|---|---|
| 1. | "Thème de Jérémie" | 4:30 |
| 2. | "Alice et Simon" | 2:38 |
| 3. | "Les Anges au Piano" | 3:31 |
| 4. | "Chez Yves (Alice et Clara)" | 3:33 |
| 5. | "Jean-Baptiste à la Fenêtre" | 3:04 |
| 6. | "Thème de Laetitia" | 6:01 |
| 7. | "Escapades" | 3:04 |
| 8. | "La Cabane au Zodiac" | 2:08 |
| 9. | "Dans les Bois/M. Rabier" | 5:50 |
| 10. | "Jean-Baptiste et Laetitia" | 1:17 |
| 11. | "Thème de Simon" | 3:52 |
| 12. | "Au Café" | 5:33 |
| 13. | "Theme d'Alice" | 13:08 |

=== Charts ===
Chart performance for SYR9: Simon Werner a disparu
| Chart (2011) | Peak position |
|---|---|
| Belgian Albums (Ultratop Flanders) | 69 |
| UK Soundtrack Albums (OCC) | 20 |
| US Vinyl Albums (Billboard) | 13 |
