= A Thousand Leaves =

Studio album by Sonic Youth
- Released: April 21, 1998
- Studio: Echo Canyon (New York City)
- Genres: Experimental rock; post-rock; psychedelia
- Length: 73:36
- Label: DGC
- Producers: Sonic Youth; Wharton Tiers

Sonic Youth chronology
SYR3: Invito al ĉielo (1998)	A Thousand Leaves (1998)	Silver Session for Jason Knuth (1998)

Sonic Youth studio album chronology
Washing Machine (1995)	A Thousand Leaves (1998)	NYC Ghosts & Flowers (2000)

Singles from A Thousand Leaves
- 1. "Sunday" Released: April 23, 1998

A Thousand Leaves is the tenth studio album by American rock band Sonic Youth, released on CD and cassette on May 12, 1998, by DGC Records. A double-LP vinyl issue had been released three weeks earlier, on April 21, 1998, by My So Called Records. It was the band's first album recorded at their own studio in Lower Manhattan, which was built with the money they had made at the 1995 Lollapalooza festival. Since the band had an unlimited amount of time to work in their studio, the album features numerous lengthy and improvisational tracks that were developed unevenly. The highly experimental extended plays Anagrama, Slaapkamers met slagroom, and Invito al ĉielo were recorded simultaneously with the album.

A Thousand Leaves reached number 85 on the US Billboard 200 and number 38 on the UK Albums Chart. It received generally favorable reviews from critics, who praised the lengthy, quiet guitar interplay between band members Thurston Moore and Lee Ranaldo. However, some criticized the forced vocal delivery of member Kim Gordon and found several tracks to be unnecessarily long and poorly constructed. The song "Sunday" was released as a single with a music video directed by Harmony Korine and starring American actor Macaulay Culkin.

== Background and recording ==
A Thousand Leaves is the follow-up to Sonic Youth's 1995 album Washing Machine, which was released shortly after the band concluded their stint headlining the 1995 Lollapalooza music festival. With the money they had made at the festival, the band decided to build a recording studio, called Echo Canyon, on Murray Street in Lower Manhattan. The span of nearly three years between Washing Machine and A Thousand Leaves also represented the longest gap between studio albums in Sonic Youth's career at the time. Singer and guitarist Thurston Moore explained that the band needed a break, noting that they had been touring non-stop for 16 years. He said, "We're having children, we're getting older, let's just cool out a little bit and build this workshop, and go that way, work that route." In their new studio, the band began writing new songs from extended improvisations in rehearsal. Several instrumental jams were released as extended plays through the band's own record label, Sonic Youth Recordings, and distributed by Smells Like Records, an independent record label previously formed by drummer Steve Shelley. These include Anagrama, Slaapkamers met slagroom and Invito al ĉielo.

Since A Thousand Leaves was the first Sonic Youth album that was recorded in their own studio, the band had more time and freedom to work on it. As a result, the songs evolved unevenly and were recorded from an early stage of development. According to guitarist Lee Ranaldo, the album is "a reflection of where we were at the time. We weren't into making anything concise. We were just playing what we felt like playing. We really didn't feel like what we needed to be doing was producing another record like Goo." The 11-minute song "Hits of Sunshine (For Allen Ginsberg)" was initially intended to be released on one of the EPs as an instrumental track, but it was ultimately included on the album with vocals. The album was co-produced by the band and Confusion Is Sex producer Wharton Tiers and mastered by Greg Calbi at Masterdisk in New York City.

== Music and lyrics ==
Musically, A Thousand Leaves was considered more expansive and relaxed than previous Sonic Youth albums, with less feedback and more guitar playing and improvisation. According to David Browne, the record explored post-rock sounds that were "subtler" and "quirkier" than most mainstream rock at the time. The title of the album was inspired by Walt Whitman's Leaves of Grass. According to Moore, "The same way he improvises with images and words, we improvise with sounds and notes". He also attributed the style of the album to the fact that the band was getting older, commenting, "You also become much involved with your thoughts about life experience in general. Having children is incredible in that way." The song "Snare, Girl" explored these topics. The longest song on the album, "Hits of Sunshine (For Allen Ginsberg)", referenced American poet Allen Ginsberg and contains an instrumental interlude that was described as "a subtle, drawn-out passage of Morse code guitar lines and lazy afternoon with wah-wah pedal licks—bliss in slow motion."

Like previous Sonic Youth albums, A Thousand Leaves also contains songs that deal with gender roles and stereotypes. The song "Female Mechanic Now on Duty", sung by band member Kim Gordon, was a reaction to how journalists categorize female musicians. It was inspired by Meredith Brooks's hit "Bitch". Similarly, in "The Ineffable Me", Gordon expressed her opposition to such limitations. The song "Karen Koltrane", sung by Ranaldo, is about a lover from his college days who had "a far less extraordinary adulthood" than he had first thought, while "Hoarfrost", which was originally titled "Woodland Ode", was inspired when Ranaldo and his wife Leah Singer went for a walk in the snow during a visit they made to Singer's parents in Winnipeg, Manitoba, Canada. The track "Sunday" is generally considered the album's most accessible song. It was originally recorded for Richard Linklater's 1997 film SubUrbia, but was later re-recorded for A Thousand Leaves.

== Release ==
A Thousand Leaves was released on vinyl, CD, and cassette formats on May 12, 1998, by DGC Records. The album cover features an artwork by artist Marnie Weber, which depicts a hamster and Weber herself at age 12 sporting animal horns. According to Moore, the image is a reference to the Unlimited Edition compilation album by German experimental rock band Can. Originally, the album was titled Mille Feuille (French for A Thousand Leaves) and was intended to feature an image of Moore holding a pastry as the cover art. To promote the album, a radio edit version of "Sunday" was released as a single to modern rock, college, and public radio in April 1998. The band also supported the album with a tour across the US and Canada from May to June 1998.

Upon release, A Thousand Leaves reached No. 85 on the US Billboard 200 and No. 38 on the UK Albums Chart. The album also charted in other countries, including France, Belgium, Sweden and Norway. The single "Sunday" reached No. 72 in the UK Singles Chart and was eventually released on vinyl and CD on July 14, 1998, containing a Nirvana cover, "Moist Vagina", as one of its B-sides. A music video directed by Harmony Korine and starring Macaulay Culkin was made for the single. The band chose Korine due to his work on the films Kids (1995) and Gummo (1997), the first of which featured several young actors who previously appeared in the music video for the band's 1993 single "Sugar Kane", including American actress Chloë Sevigny. As of July 1999, the album had sold 54,000 copies in the United States according to Nielsen SoundScan. And as of 2005, the album had sold 66,000 copies.

== Critical reception ==
Professional ratings
Review scores
Source	Rating
AllMusic	4/5 stars
Encyclopedia of Popular Music	4/5 stars
Entertainment Weekly	C+
The Guardian	3/5 stars
Los Angeles Times	2.5/4 stars
NME	9/10
Pitchfork	7.1/10 (1998); 7.6/10 (2019)
Rolling Stone	3.5/5 stars
Spin	7/10
The Village Voice	A+

A Thousand Leaves was well received by critics, some of whom regarded it as one of Sonic Youth's best albums yet. Writing for AllMusic, Stephen Thomas Erlewine described the album as "the band's most challenging and satisfying record in years" and praised its quiet guitars and unpredictable twists, which kept the lengthy songs captivating. Pitchfork editor Brent DiCrescenzo cited "Hits of Sunshine (For Allen Ginsberg)" as the album's centerpiece and highlighted the album's jamming, improvising, and guitar interplay between Moore and Ranaldo. David Stubbs of Spin criticized Gordon's weak singing and forced guitar playing on "Contre le sexisme", "Female Mechanic Now on Duty", and "The Ineffable Me", but nevertheless judged the "continually inventive fretboard effects" of Moore and Ranaldo, which "[sparkle] gold-plating adornments that cut open and irritate [the album] at every turn."

Other reviews were less enthusiastic. Sara Scribner from the Los Angeles Times said that A Thousand Leaves was a monotonous "experimental, psychedelic record" that felt "like a passionless, less thoughtful shadow of [the band's] former self". J.D. Considine of Entertainment Weekly stated similar cons, calling the record "the sort of thing that gives art rock a bad name." Ben Ratliff of Rolling Stone found the songs to be unnecessarily long and sluggish, commenting that the album "really does sound like a demo — eleven songs waiting for better organization and cliché removal". Similarly, Stephen Thompson of The A.V. Club felt that the album rarely contained fully formed songs and that the band should start "completing its ideas before recording them for posterity." Orlando Weekly criticized Gordon's "contrived and annoying" vocal delivery, saying that many songs are "merely lengthy feedback collages with pasted-on vocals and gobs of art-school pretension", but also admitted that the album contains some "hidden gems" like "Sunday" and "Wildflower Soul".

In a very positive review for The Village Voice, Robert Christgau called A Thousand Leaves a mature and beautiful record, commenting: "It's the music of a daydream nation old enough to treasure whatever time it finds on its hands. Where a decade ago [Sonic Youth] plunged and plodded, drunk on the forward notion of the van they were stuck in, here they wander at will, dazzled by sunshine, greenery, hoarfrost and machines that go squish in the night." Although the album was not ranked in the Top 40 of The Village Voice's Pazz & Jop critics' poll for 1998, Christgau, the poll's creator, placed it at No. 3 in his own "Dean's List". He would later name it one of the 10 best records of the 1990s. Similarly, the editors of NME placed the album at No. 40 in their year-end top 50 list. The Wire named the album its record of the year in its year-end critics' poll.

== Track listing ==
All tracks are written by Sonic Youth.

No.	Title	Vocals	Length
1.	"Contre le sexisme"	Gordon	3:55
2.	"Sunday"	Moore	4:52
3.	"Female Mechanic Now on Duty"	Gordon	7:43
4.	"Wildflower Soul"	Moore, Gordon (background vocals)	9:04
5.	"Hoarfrost"	Ranaldo	5:01
6.	"French Tickler"	Gordon	4:52
7.	"Hits of Sunshine (For Allen Ginsberg)"	Moore	11:05
8.	"Karen Koltrane"	Ranaldo, Moore (background vocals)	9:20
9.	"The Ineffable Me"	Gordon	5:21
10.	"Snare, Girl"	Moore	6:38
11.	"Heather Angel"	Gordon	6:09
Total length:			73:36

== Personnel ==
Credits are adapted from the album's liner notes.

Sonic Youth

- Thurston Moore – guitar, vocals, production
- Kim Gordon – guitar, bass, vocals, production
- Lee Ranaldo – guitar, vocals, production
- Steve Shelley – drums, production

Technical

- Wharton Tiers – production
- Don Fleming – additional production
- Greg Calbi – mastering
- Frank Olinsky – sleeve art direction
- Mark Borthwick – sleeve photography and typography
- Marnie Weber – cover artwork

== Charts ==
Chart performance for A Thousand Leaves
Chart (1998)	Peak position
Australian Albums (ARIA)	66
Belgian Albums (Ultratop Flanders)	28
Canada Top Albums/CDs (RPM)	65
French Albums (SNEP)	32
German Albums (Offizielle Top 100)	84
Norwegian Albums (VG-lista)	37
Scottish Albums (Official Charts)	52
Swedish Albums (Sverigetopplistan)	43
UK Albums (Official Charts)	38
UK Rock & Metal Albums (Official Charts)	1
US Billboard 200	85
