= NYC Ghosts & Flowers =

Studio album by Sonic Youth
- Released: May 16, 2000
- Recorded: August 1999 – February 2000
- Genres: Noise rock; experimental rock
- Length: 42:18
- Label: DGC
- Producers: Sonic Youth; Jim O'Rourke

Sonic Youth chronology
SYR4: Goodbye 20th Century (1999)	NYC Ghosts & Flowers (2000)	SYR5 (2000)

Sonic Youth studio album chronology
A Thousand Leaves (1998)	NYC Ghosts & Flowers (2000)	Murray Street (2002)

NYC Ghosts & Flowers is the eleventh studio album by American rock band Sonic Youth, released on May 16, 2000, by DGC Records. The highly experimental album is considered to be a reaction to the theft of the band's instruments in July 1999, when several irreplaceable guitars and effects pedals were stolen. NYC Ghosts & Flowers was the first album since Bad Moon Rising in which the band used prepared guitar.

== Background ==
As a result of the theft, the members of Sonic Youth relied upon "old guitars in their studio, unearthing instruments they hadn't used in years" which "along with equipment purchased to fulfill the remaining [...] dates [of the tour], would serve as the foundation for six new songs written over the next month", in addition to "Free City Rhymes" and "Renegade Princess", which were written prior to the tour. The band members later acknowledged that "the gear theft was somewhat of a blessing, if [also] a rather unwelcome and unpleasant one, in that it truly forced them to 'start over' and approach creating music with brand new boundaries".

== Release ==
NYC Ghosts & Flowers was released on May 16, 2000, by record label DGC.

A music video was released for the track "Nevermind (What Was It Anyway)". According to the band's official website, it was a proposed single that "never actually found its way into stores."

== Critical reception ==
Professional ratings
Aggregate scores
Source	Rating
Metacritic	66/100
Review scores
Source	Rating
AllMusic	2.5/5 stars
Alternative Press	3/5
Blender	3/5 stars
Entertainment Weekly	B
The Guardian	3/5 stars
NME	8/10
Pitchfork	0.0/10
Rolling Stone	3.5/5 stars
Spin	8/10
The Village Voice	A

NYC Ghosts & Flowers received an approval rating of 66 out of 100 on review aggregator website Metacritic, signifying "generally favorable reviews". In a positive review for the Chicago Tribune, Greg Kot said "though Sonic Youth flirted with alternative-rock songcraft in the early '90s, these noise-rock renegades are once again happily viewing their guitars as hunks of wood, wire and infinite possibility." He went on to write, "No rock band makes the avant-garde sound quite this tactile and sensual." Salon.com also gave the album a positive review and stated, "Even while there isn't a single song here that holds together from beginning to end, even as the music makes only itself felt in halting jigsaw fashion... the album has a gloomy, unaccommodating tenacity that's hard to shake." Mojo stated that "in the end, it's surprisingly worth it for the few great, strange tracks." In Spin, Douglas Wolk hailed it as Sonic Youth's "artiest, most texturally spectacular album" yet, writing that it "fashions a link between the free-jazz of the New York Art Quartet and the psychotic spasms of 1978's no wave grail, No New York." In NME's opinion, the album "burns with such a sense of direction and focus" that revealed the group to still be "a vital creative force" in music.

According to Robert Christgau, NYC Ghosts & Flowers proved to be Sonic Youth's "dud by acclamation" among critics; he himself had given it a positive review in The Village Voice but later said the record's "meanderings", which had "captivated me in their ambiently environmental way, never fully reconnected" on later listens. Select wrote that "the songs suffer from a lazy approach and the relentless repetition of unengaging chord patterns." Billboard believed the record "either encapsulates Sonic Youth's most endearing or annoying qualities, depending on how one feels about the band and the spoken-word poetics from Kim Gordon." Brent DiCrescenzo's review for Pitchfork was far more critical and assigned the album a score of 0.0 out of 10, with the critic panning it as "an unfathomable album which will be heard in the squash courts and open mic nights of deepest Hell." Commenting on the album's avant-garde roots, he said, "These are not new ideas. These are ideas that were arrogant and unlistenable upon birth thirty years ago." DiCrescenzo later reevaluated his opinion of the album and, in 2013, remarked on the higher esteem with which he now held it: "I now love the record. It's unlike anything else; eerie and beautiful. [...] No, the lesson here is: beware the opinions of a kid right out of college." He also described Pitchfork's decimal scale as "knowingly silly" and "arbitrary".

== Track listing ==
All tracks are written by Sonic Youth (Thurston Moore, Kim Gordon, Lee Ranaldo, Steve Shelley).

No.	Title	Vocals	Length
1.	"Free City Rhymes"	Moore	7:32
2.	"Renegade Princess"	Moore, Gordon, Ranaldo	5:49
3.	"Nevermind (What Was It Anyway)"	Gordon	5:37
4.	"Small Flowers Crack Concrete"	Moore (harmony vocals: Gordon, Ranaldo)	5:12
5.	"Side2Side"	Gordon	3:34
6.	"StreamXSonik Subway"	Moore	2:51
7.	"NYC Ghosts & Flowers"	Ranaldo	7:52
8.	"Lightnin'"	Gordon	3:51
Total length:			42:18

Note: For the vinyl version, "Renegade Princess" was moved to track 6, and "Side2Side" & "StreamXSonik Subway" were swapped in order.

== Personnel ==
Sonic Youth

- Thurston Moore – vocals, guitar, production
- Kim Gordon – vocals, bass guitar, guitar, trumpet, sleeve illustration (Girl Drawing, 2000), production
- Lee Ranaldo – vocals, guitars, synthesizer, production, sleeve photography (1998)
- Steve Shelley – drums, percussion, production

Additional personnel

- Jim O'Rourke – bass guitar (1, 4), electronics (5), production, additional recording, additional mixing
- Rafael Toral – Spacestatic guitar (2)
- William Winant – percussion (5)

Technical

- Wharton Tiers – recording
- Greg Calbi – mastering
- Frank Olinsky – sleeve art direction
- Dan Graham – sleeve artwork (video still from Rock My Religion, 1980)
- D. A. Levy – sleeve spiral drawing (1967)
- Joe Brainard – sleeve painting (Flower Painting IV, 1967)
- Robert Mooney – sleeve painting (untitled, 1992)
- William S. Burroughs – sleeve painting (X-Ray Man, 1992)

== Charts ==
Chart performance for NYC Ghosts & Flowers
Chart (2000)	Peak position
French Albums (SNEP)	61
Norwegian Albums (VG-lista)	37
UK Albums (Official Charts)	113
UK Rock & Metal Albums (Official Charts)	8
US Billboard 200	172
