= Sonic Youth Recordings =

Record label

- Founded: 1996
- Founder: Sonic Youth
- Genre: experimental music
- Country of origin: United States

Sonic Youth Recordings (sometimes referred to as SYR) is a record label established by American alternative rock band Sonic Youth in 1996. SYR was set up to allow the band to release records by themselves and their friends without the commercial pressures of a major label. As a result, the work on this label tends towards free improvisation and experimental music.

The records that Sonic Youth themselves released on this label follow a tradition where each album is released in a different language. SYR1 has song titles and album sleeve artwork in French; SYR2 is in Dutch, SYR3 is in Esperanto, SYR4 is in English, SYR5 is in Japanese, SYR6 is in Lithuanian, SYR7 is in Arpitan, SYR8 is in Danish, SYR9 is in French, and AUG5 is in English.

== Discography ==
- Sonic Youth - SYR1: Anagrama (1997)
- Sonic Youth - SYR2: Slaapkamers Met Slagroom (1997)
- Sonic Youth/Jim O'Rourke - SYR3: Invito Al Ĉielo (1998)
- Sonic Youth and others - SYR4: Goodbye 20th Century (1999)
- Kim Gordon/Ikue Mori/DJ Olive - SYR5: ミュージカル パ一スペクティブ (2000)
- Sonic Youth/Tim Barnes - SYR6: Koncertas Stan Brakhage Prisiminimui (2005)
- Sonic Youth - SYR7: J'Accuse Ted Hughes (2008)
- Sonic Youth with Mats Gustafsson and Merzbow - SYR8: Andre Sider Af Sonic Youth (2008)
- Sonic Youth - SYR9: Simon Werner a Disparu (2011)
- Sonic Youth - AUG5: Perspectives Musicales (2020)

== See also ==
- List of record labels
