= Sonic Nurse =

Studio album by Sonic Youth
- Released: June 8, 2004
- Recorded: July 2003 – February 2004
- Studios: Echo Canyon, New York City
- Genre: Alternative rock
- Length: 60:15
- Label: Geffen
- Producer: Sonic Youth

Sonic Youth chronology
Murray Street (2002)	Sonic Nurse (2004)	SYR6: Koncertas Stan Brakhage prisiminimui (2005)

Sonic Youth studio album chronology
Murray Street (2002)	Sonic Nurse (2004)	Rather Ripped (2006)

Singles from Sonic Nurse
- 1. "Kim Gordon and the Arthur Doyle Hand Cream" Released: 2003; 2. "Unmade Bed" Released: 2004

Sonic Nurse is the thirteenth studio album by American rock band Sonic Youth, released on June 8, 2004, by Geffen Records.

== Content ==
The album's cover art was designed by artist Richard Prince from his Nurse Paintings series. Furthermore, one of Prince's photographic creations in this series was titled "Dude Ranch Nurse", which is also the name of a song on this record.

"Pattern Recognition" was based on the 2003 William Gibson novel of the same name. Sonic Youth had used Gibson's work as an influence before, notably on a few tracks from Daydream Nation (1988).

"Kim Gordon and the Arthur Doyle Hand Cream" was previously released as "Mariah Carey and the Arthur Doyle Hand Cream" on the first Narnack Buddy Series 7", but the title was changed over concerns of potential legal action from Carey's legal team.

== Reception ==
Professional ratings
Aggregate scores
Source	Rating
Metacritic	77/100
Review scores
Source	Rating
AllMusic	4/5 stars
Blender	4/5 stars
Entertainment Weekly	A−
The Guardian	3/5 stars
NME	7/10
Pitchfork	8.5/10
Q	3/5 stars
Rolling Stone	3.5/5 stars
Spin	B−
The Village Voice	A−

The album has a score of 77 out of 100 from Metacritic based on "generally favorable reviews". No Ripcord gave the album 10 out of 10 stars and said it "could be the best guitar rock album since, well, Murray Street." Drowned in Sound gave it 5 out of 5 stars and said the album was "the closest to creating a landmark on parallel with Daydream Nation they've come since that particular record's nameday in '88, and in it's [sic] dense textures it maybe signals the extinction of the antediluvian No Wave idyll; a Robert Zimmerman trip that somehow got mixed up with Joni Mitchell, Black Flag and a conceptualist oddball." In his "Consumer Guide", Robert Christgau gave the album an A− and said, "This unusually songful set is well up among their late good ones, its dissonances a lingua franca deployed less atmospherically than has been their recent practice." While working for Blender, Christgau gave the same album 4 stars out of 5 and called it "[Sonic Youth's] most songful release since the major-label hellos Goo and Dirty, and by most standards their best since 1988's pivotal Daydream Nation." Filter gave the album a score of 90% and called it "a gorgeous, bona fide gem." Stylus Magazine gave it a B+ and said that the album, "if not proof of a band bursting with fresh ideas, is at least fresh-sounding."

Prefix Magazine gave it a favorable review and said, "With Sonic Nurse, it's truly possible to see 2000's excruciatingly indulgent NYC Ghosts and Flowers as a speed bump on an otherwise smooth decade of record-making. Their last, 2002's bittersweet Murray Street, was a return to form, and the epic Sonic Nurse will only supply more evidence for Sonic Youth's canonization". The Austin Chronicle gave it a score of 4 stars out of 5 and said, "Every song but one falls fully developed in the five- to seven-minute ballpark, brimming with enough dissonant wizardry, smart vocal imagery, and tonal shades of rock to fly the freak flag like no aging rockers ever have". Yahoo! Music UK gave the album 8 stars out of 10 and said, "What emerges is Sonic Youth at complete ease with themselves and their music, operating simultaneously at the peak of their powers and with a powerful, audacious restraint". Under the Radar also gave it 8 out of 10 stars and said the album "might capture something of indie rock's recent taste for emotional epics". Uncut likewise gave the album 4 stars out of 5 and stated: "The Youth sound rejuvenated". Dusted Magazine gave it a favorable review and said that "The songs, despite being mostly over five minutes long, are all to the point without feeling meandering.... The balance between noise and melody is right, with each emerging and vanishing at just the right point". The A.V. Club also gave it a favorable review and said the album "compiles a laid-back hour of elaborate plucking and rhythm from five veteran musicians who reserve musical violence and poetic anger for when it feels most appropriate". The Village Voice likewise gave it a favorable review and said the album "percolates the same melancholy satisfaction and nervous maturity, entropy and growth, in and out--but with an urgency and impulsiveness that risks upsetting the balance". E! Online gave the album a B and called it "a cure for what ails the airwaves." NME gave it a score of 7 out of 10 and said the album "sounds like a brilliant album by a lesser band".

Q gave the album 3 stars out of 5 and said it "finds [Sonic Youth] revelling in bursts of noise and awkwardness, but more surprisingly perhaps, taking as much comfort in sweet melody". Mojo also gave the album 3 stars out of 5 and said it was not "a classic rock record. And it's not a classic Sonic Youth record. It's an excursion, into corners weird and corners familiar". Alternative Press likewise gave the album 3 stars out of 5 and said it was "better than 90 percent of new rock, but with younger combos like Lightning Bolt and Liars stealing their thunder, these well-meaning vets come off as old and in the way". Spin, however, gave it a score of 5 out of 10 and called it "a strangely enervated Sonic Youth record, one that exchanges Murray Street's golden-years vigor for a sad sense of duty".

The album placed second in The Wire's annual critics' poll, where magazine staff wrote "[t]here are of course those who think the prefects of the School of Rock can do this sort of thing in their sleep nowadays, but there was no arguing with the supple versatility of their triple guitar stack and the delight with which they marry lyrics astuteness, textural grit and forward momentum."

== Track listing ==
All tracks are written by Sonic Youth.

No.	Title	Vocals	Length
1.	"Pattern Recognition"	Gordon	6:33
2.	"Unmade Bed"	Moore	3:53
3.	"Dripping Dream"	Moore	7:46
4.	"Kim Gordon and the Arthur Doyle Hand Cream"	Gordon	4:51
5.	"Stones"	Moore	7:06
6.	"Dude Ranch Nurse"	Gordon	5:44
7.	"New Hampshire"	Moore	5:12
8.	"Paper Cup Exit"	Ranaldo, background vocals Moore	5:57
9.	"I Love You Golden Blue"	Gordon	7:03
10.	"Peace Attack"	Moore	6:10

Bonus tracks
No.	Title	Length
11.	"Kim's Chords" (UK and Japan bonus track)	5:59
12.	"Beautiful Plateau" (Japan bonus track)	3:08

== Personnel ==
Sonic Youth

- Thurston Moore
- Kim Gordon
- Lee Ranaldo
- Steve Shelley
- Jim O'Rourke

Technical

- Aaron Mullan – recording engineering
- Jim O'Rourke – mixing
- Juan García – mixing assistance
- Sonic Youth – production
- John Golden – mastering
- Don Fleming – additional vocal production

Artwork

- Richard Prince – nurse paintings, band photo
- Frank Olinsky – art direction

== Charts ==
Chart performance for Sonic Nurse
Chart (2004)	Peak position
Australian Albums (ARIA)	54
Belgian Albums (Ultratop Flanders)	23
Belgian Albums (Ultratop Wallonia)	87
Dutch Albums (Album Top 100)	98
French Albums (SNEP)	40
German Albums (Offizielle Top 100)	89
Irish Albums (IRMA)	53
Italian Albums (FIMI)	50
Norwegian Albums (VG-lista)	21
US Billboard 200	64
