= Murray Street (album) =

- 2002 standard edition cover

Studio album by Sonic Youth
- Released: June 25, 2002
- Recorded: August 2001 – March 2002
- Studio: Echo Canyon, New York City, U.S.
- Genre: Rock
- Length: 45:37
- Label: DGC
- Producer: Sonic Youth

Sonic Youth chronology
In the Fishtank 9 (2001)	Murray Street (2002)	Sonic Nurse (2004)

Sonic Youth studio album chronology
NYC Ghosts & Flowers (2000)	Murray Street (2002)	Sonic Nurse (2004)

Murray Street (sometimes written as Murray St.) is the twelfth studio album by American rock band Sonic Youth, released on June 25, 2002 by DGC Records.

Received to critical acclaim, it is the band's first album as an official five-piece, with Jim O'Rourke playing guitar and bass to bolster the group's sound.

== Background and recording ==
Recording began in August 2001 in the band's Echo Canyon studio in New York City, following their final NYC Ghosts and Flowers/Goodbye to the 20th Century tour. The first release of material from the sessions was the song "Plastic Sun", on a promotional CD included with an issue of Jane magazine. However, due to an error in the pitch, the band re-released the song on their website.

Recording sessions reached an unexpected halt following the September 11 attacks as the band instead led a World Trade Center benefit festival on October 9. Several other benefits and gigs led them to their rescheduled March 17, 2002, appearance at the All Tomorrow's Parties festival in Los Angeles, California. By then, recording and mixing for the album was complete and all seven tracks (first revealed on the band website) were played at the festival. The new material was hailed as a return to the style of distorted and complex instrumentals that made the band underground favorites.

The album is named after the address of the Echo Canyon studio, 47 Murray Street, in the Tribeca neighborhood of Manhattan. It was located within a block of the former World Trade Center, and during the attacks, a plane engine landed on Murray Street.

== Content ==
Art director Frank Olinsky led the conception of the cover designs. The young blonde-haired girl pictured to the right on the album's cover is Coco Gordon-Moore, Thurston Moore and Kim Gordon's daughter, picking strawberries with her friend, Stella, who is on the left. No title is shown on the cover, just a scrawled "SONIC YOUTH". The three-page, double-sided CD booklet, whose cover features a reverse color image of the CD cover, includes liner notes, photographs and album credits. The back cover depicts the Murray Street street sign.

== Release ==
In early June 2002, Murray Street was released in Japan with the bonus track, "Street Sauce". June 10 was the release date in Europe and June 25 was the release in North America. In France, 500 copies came with a limited-edition bonus blue vinyl 10" EP, named Kali Yug Express, which featured three exclusive tracks from their recent soundtrack developments: "Derniere Minute Electrifee" on one side, "Le Paysage Zim Zum" and "Coca Neon Kamera Sutra" on the other. In North America, the disc was enhanced, including a screen saver and link to a "secret" link on the Sonic Youth website that offered promo photographs, music videos and all three songs from the Kali Yug Express EP. The gatefold vinyl edition was released on the Smells Like Records Goofin imprint.

Upon release, Murray Street was a moderate success, peaking at number 126 on the Billboard 200.

== Critical reception ==
Professional ratings
Aggregate scores
Source	Rating
Metacritic	82/100
Review scores
Source	Rating
AllMusic	4/5 stars
Blender	4/5 stars
Entertainment Weekly	A−
The Guardian	3/5 stars
Los Angeles Times	3.5/4 stars
NME	6/10
Pitchfork	9.0/10
Q	4/5 stars
Rolling Stone	4/5 stars
Spin	8/10

Murray Street received a score of 82 out of 100 from Metacritic based on "universal acclaim". Entertainment Weekly wrote that, with the album, "Sonic Youth find a balance – between formlessness and structure, melody and cacophony – that's eluded them for a while". Playlouder gave the album 4.5 out of 5 stars and said, "There is just enough balance between the tune, and the unexpected jazz chords, ear-splitting squeals, and lovely harmonic noises to make it forever listenable". The A.V. Club gave it a favorable review and said the album "doesn't mark an epochal moment for Sonic Youth, but its familiar nods and new ingredients--from Steve Shelley's occasionally near-funky drumming to O'Rourke's tingly laptop textures--stake out another high point for a band achieving self-realization by reconciling self-absorption with a sigh and a smile". Neumu.net gave it a score of 8 of 10 stars and stated: "Written with some basic, inviting rock structures, the album replaces the hyper energy and angst of older material with slowed-down, complex textures and delicate grooves -- but still rocks out intermittently". Nude as the News gave it a score of 8 out of 10 and said, "Whether they came on board at Daydream Nation or Experimental Jet Set, true believers will relish this one".

Uncut gave it 4 of 5 stars, and said that the album "contains some of the best music Sonic Youth have recorded since the landmark Daydream Nation in 1988". Blender also gave it 4 of 5 stars and said of Sonic Youth, "They've got more sweet-and-bitter guitar muscle than ever". Q likewise gave the album 4 stars and called it "an essay in coolly assured, sophisticated leftfield rock, occasionally laden with trademark discordance yet also full of scintillating tunes". Billboard gave it a favorable review and said the album "features some of the group's most focused and seductive work ever". Mojo also gave the album 4 stars while labeling it as the "Album of the Month", and said, "The band's conventional elements are even more conventional while the boundary-pushers stretch as far as ever". Spin likewise gave the album a score of 8 out of 10 and said, "This time around, the band square their artier tendencies with their sweet tooth for classic psych-rock". No Ripcord gave it 8 of 10 stars and said, "If you doubt the importance of Sonic Youth then a few listens to Murray Street will make you think again. Yes, there are only seven rather lengthy tracks here but you'll have to look elsewhere for signs of indulgence".

Alternative Press gave the album 3.5 out of 5 stars and said that it "features less avant-garde noodling and more straight-up Youth". However, The Village Voice gave it a mixed review and said, "The new album isn't terrible, just dull". Kludge included it on their list of best albums of 2002. Robert Christgau, who was somewhat unimpressed in his original Village Voice review, later said that "Murray's song-soundscape fusion ... sounded strong" in retrospect.

== Accolades ==
The Wire named Murray Street its record of the year for 2002. Pitchfork placed Murray Street at number 108 in their list of the 200 greatest albums of the 2000s.

== Track listing ==
All tracks are written by Sonic Youth (Thurston Moore, Kim Gordon, Lee Ranaldo, Steve Shelley, Jim O'Rourke).

No.	Title	Vocals	Length
1.	"The Empty Page"	Moore	4:20
2.	"Disconnection Notice"	Moore	6:24
3.	"Rain on Tin"	Moore	7:56
4.	"Karen Revisited"	Ranaldo	11:10
5.	"Radical Adults Lick Godhead Style"	Moore	4:27
6.	"Plastic Sun"	Gordon	2:14
7.	"Sympathy for the Strawberry"	Gordon	9:06
Total length:			45:37

Japanese CD bonus track
No.	Title	Length
8.	"Street Sauce"	7:34
Total length:		53:11

Note: On the LP edition of the album, "Karen Revisited" is ordered before "Rain on Tin".

== Personnel ==
Sonic Youth

- Thurston Moore – vocals (1–3, 5), guitar, photography
- Kim Gordon – vocals (6, 7), guitar (1, 2, 4, 6, 7), bass (3, 5), backing vocals (5)
- Lee Ranaldo – vocals (4), guitar, backing vocals (1), keyboards (7)
- Jim O'Rourke – guitar (3–5), bass (1, 2, 4, 6, 7), recording, engineering, mixing
- Steve Shelley – drums, percussion

Additional musicians

- Jim Sauter – horns (5)
- Don Dietrich – horns (5)

Technical personnel

- Sonic Youth – production
- Aaron Mullan – assistant engineering
- John Golden – mastering

Design personnel

- Frank Olinsky – art direction
- Monique Voorhout – photography, artwork
- Stefano Giovannini – photography

== Charts ==
Chart performance for Murray Street
Chart (2002)	Peak position
Australian Albums (ARIA)	78
Austrian Albums (Ö3 Austria)	52
Belgian Albums (Ultratop Flanders)	28
French Albums (SNEP)	48
German Albums (Offizielle Top 100)	63
Irish Albums (IRMA)	67
Norwegian Albums (VG-lista)	16
UK Albums (OCC)	77
US Billboard 200	126
