= Sonic Youth =

American rock band (1981–2011)

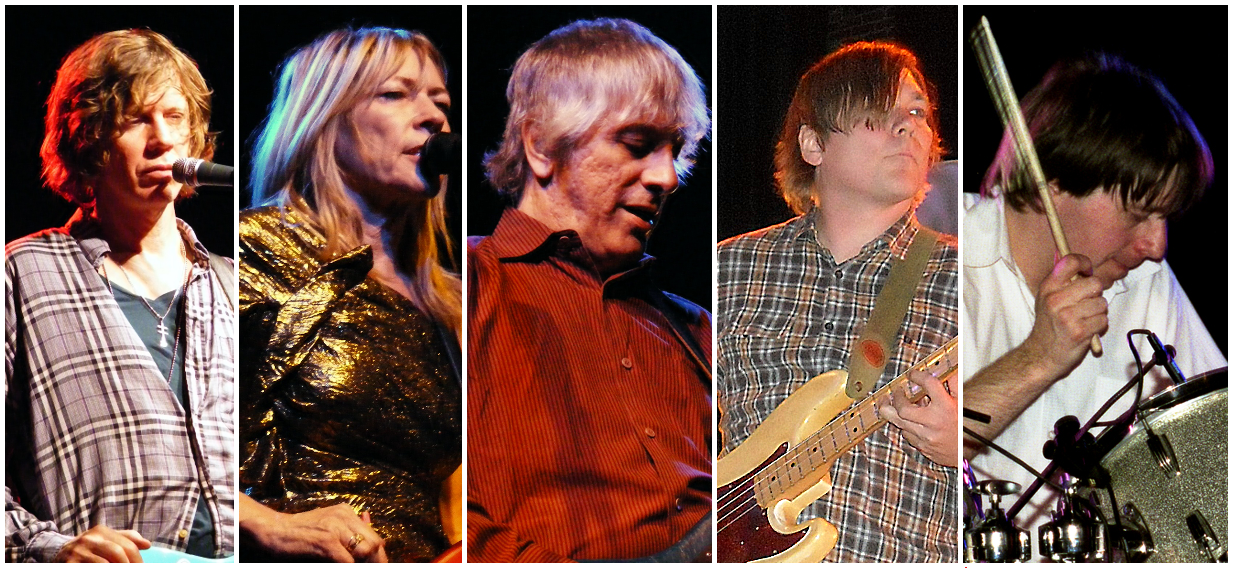
- Final lineup of the band before their 2011 breakup; from left to right: Thurston Moore, Kim Gordon, Lee Ranaldo, Mark Ibold, Steve Shelley

Background information
- Also known as: Ciccone Youth (1988)
- Origin: New York City, U.S.
- Genres: Noise rock; indie rock; experimental rock; post-punk; art rock; alternative rock; no wave
- Works: Discography
- Years active: 1981–2011
- Labels: Neutral; Sub Pop; Ecstatic Peace!; Blast First; Homestead; SST; Enigma; Au Go Go; Geffen; DGC; SYR; Matador
- Spinoffs: Body/Head; Chelsea Light Moving; Ciccone Youth; Dim Stars; Free Kitten; Harry Crews
- Past members: Kim Gordon; Thurston Moore; Anne DeMarinis; Lee Ranaldo; Richard Edson; Bob Bert; Jim Sclavunos; Steve Shelley; Jim O'Rourke; Mark Ibold
- Website: sonicyouth.com

Sonic Youth was an American rock band formed in New York City in 1981. Founding members Kim Gordon (bass, vocals, guitar), Thurston Moore (guitar, vocals) and Lee Ranaldo (guitar, vocals) remained together for the entire history of the band, while drummer Steve Shelley, who joined in 1985, rounded out the core lineup. Jim O'Rourke (bass, guitar, keyboards) was also a member from 1999 to 2005; Mark Ibold of Pavement (bass, guitar) joined in 2006 and remained in the band until their 2011 split.

Sonic Youth emerged from Manhattan's no wave experimental art and music scene before evolving into a more conventional alternative rock band and becoming prominent in the American noise rock scene. Sonic Youth has been praised for having "redefined what rock guitar could do", including the use of a wide variety of unorthodox tunings and preparing guitars with objects like drumsticks and screwdrivers. The band was a pivotal influence on the alternative and indie rock movements, particularly noted for their advancement of noise into mainstream rock.

After gaining a large underground following and critical praise through releases with SST Records in the late 1980s, the band became more popular throughout the 1990s and 2000s after signing to major label DGC in 1990 and headlining the 1995 Lollapalooza festival. The band disbanded in 2011 following the separation and subsequent divorce of Gordon and Moore, with their final live shows taking place in Brazil. The members have since asserted that the band is finished and will not reunite.

== History ==
=== Formation and early history: 1977–1981 ===
Shortly after guitarist Thurston Moore moved to New York City in early 1977, he formed the group Room Tone with his roommates; they later changed their name to the Coachmen. After the breakup of the Coachmen, Moore began jamming with Stanton Miranda, whose band, CKM, featured Kim Gordon. Moore and Gordon formed a band, appearing under names like Male Bonding, Red Milk, and the Arcadians before settling on Sonic Youth in mid-1981. This name came from combining the nickname of MC5 guitarist Fred "Sonic" Smith with that of reggae artist Big Youth. Gordon later recalled that "as soon as Thurston came up with the name Sonic Youth, a certain sound that was more of what we wanted to do came about". The band played Noise Fest in June 1981 at New York's White Columns gallery, where Lee Ranaldo was playing as a member of composer Glenn Branca's electric guitar ensemble. Their performance impressed Moore, who described them as "the most ferocious guitar band that I had ever seen in my life", and he invited Ranaldo to join Sonic Youth. The new trio played three songs at the festival later in the week without a drummer. Each band member took turns playing the drums until they met drummer Richard Edson. Anne DeMarinis was in Sonic Youth for a brief period in 1981 as a keyboardist when they performed for the first time at Noise Fest. She performed, along with Gordon and Moore, on three known Sonic Youth songs performed only on June 18, 1981, and left the band before their self-titled debut EP was recorded in December.

=== Early releases: 1982–1985 ===
Branca signed Sonic Youth as the first act on his label Neutral Records. In December 1981, the group recorded five songs at New York's Radio City Music Hall. This material was released as the EP Sonic Youth; while largely ignored, it was sent to a few key members of the American music press, who gave it uniformly favorable reviews. The EP featured a relatively conventional post-punk style, in contrast to their later releases. Edson then quit the group to play full time in his other band, KONK and was replaced by Bob Bert.

During their early days, Sonic Youth formed a friendship with fellow New York noise rock band Swans. The bands shared a rehearsal space, and Sonic Youth embarked on its first tour in November 1982 supporting Swans. During a second tour with Swans the following month, tensions ran high and Moore constantly criticized Bert's drumming, which he felt was not "in the pocket". Bert was fired afterwards and replaced by Jim Sclavunos. Sclavunos played on the band's first studio album, 1983's Confusion Is Sex, which featured a louder and more dissonant sound than their debut EP. Sonic Youth set up a tour of Europe for the summer of 1983. Sclavunos, however, quit the band after only a few months. The group asked Bert to rejoin, and he agreed on the condition that he would not be fired again after the tour's conclusion. Bert went on to play on the band's Kill Yr Idols EP later in 1983.

Sonic Youth were well received in Europe, but the New York press largely ignored the local noise rock scene. Eventually, as the press began to take notice of the genre, Sonic Youth was grouped with bands like Big Black, the Butthole Surfers, and Pussy Galore under the "pigfucker" label by Village Voice editor Robert Christgau. Another critic from The Village Voice panned a September concert by the band in New York. Gordon wrote a scornful letter to the newspaper, criticizing it for not supporting its local music scene, to which Christgau responded that the paper was not obligated to support them. Moore retaliated by renaming the band's song "Kill Yr Idols" to "I Killed Christgau with My Big Fucking Dick" before the two eventually sorted out their differences amicably.

Closing a second European tour in late 1983, Sonic Youth's disastrous London debut saw the band's equipment malfunctioning and Moore destroying it onstage in frustration. When they returned to New York, they were now popular enough to be able to book local gigs regularly. The following year, Moore and Gordon married, and Sonic Youth recorded Bad Moon Rising, a self-described "Americana" album that served as a reaction to the state of the nation at the time. The album, recorded by Martin Bisi, was built around transitional pieces that Moore and Ranaldo had come up with in order to take up time onstage during tuning breaks; as a result, there are almost no gaps between the songs on the records. Bad Moon Rising featured an appearance by Lydia Lunch on "Death Valley '69", which was inspired by the Manson Family.

Due to a falling-out with Branca over disputed royalty payments from their Neutral releases, Sonic Youth signed with Homestead Records in the US and Blast First in the UK (which founder Paul Smith created simply so he could distribute the band's records in Europe). While the New York press ignored Bad Moon Rising upon its 1985 release, now viewing the band as too arty and pretentious, they gained critical acclaim in the United Kingdom, where the new album sold 5,000 copies.

Claiming he was bored with playing Bad Moon Rising live in its entirety for over a year, Bert quit the group and was replaced by Steve Shelley, formerly of the Lansing, Michigan, hardcore punk group the Crucifucks. Sonic Youth was so impressed with Shelley's drumming after seeing him play live that they hired him without an audition. Bert and Shelley both appeared in the music video for "Death Valley '69", as Bert had performed the drums on the song, but Shelley was the group's drummer when the video was filmed.

=== SST and Enigma: 1986–1989 ===
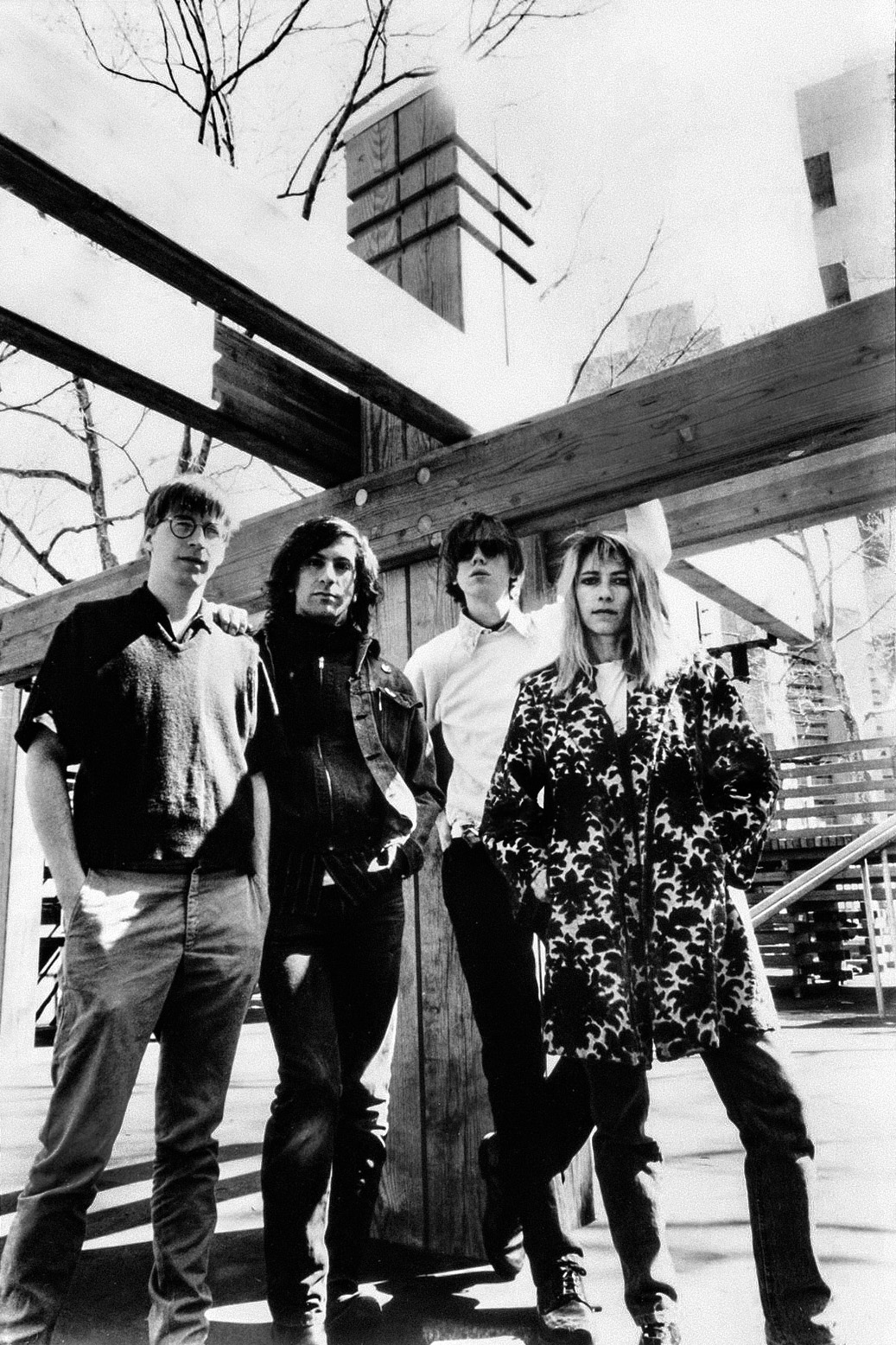
Sonic Youth in a publicity photo issued by SST to promote their fourth album, Sister (1987). Left to right: Shelley, Ranaldo, Moore, Gordon.

Sonic Youth had long appreciated SST Records, the independent label founded by Greg Ginn of Black Flag; Ranaldo said, "It was the first record company we were on that we really would have given anything to be on". Sonic Youth signed with the label in early 1986 and began recording EVOL with Martin Bisi. The band gained national attention when signing with SST, making them the first band from the New York underground to gain such notice. The mainstream music press subsequently began to take notice of the band. Critic Robert Palmer of The New York Times declared that Sonic Youth was "making the most startlingly original guitar-based music since Jimi Hendrix" and even People reviewed EVOL, describing the album as the "aural equivalent of a toxic waste dump". The album was later called "a classic" by Neil Young.

Around the same time, the band collaborated with former Minutemen bassist Mike Watt under the alias Ciccone Youth, which was a play on the names Sonic Youth and Ciccone, the surname of Madonna. They released a single in 1986 and the LP The Whitey Album in 1988 as Ciccone Youth. The 1986 single, "Into the Groove(y)", was a cover of Madonna's "Into the Groove" and was preceded by "Tuff Titty Rap". The flip side of the record was Watt's cover of Madonna's "Burning Up". The Whitey Album included both Sonic Youth songs from the single plus a demo version of "Burnin' Up". The album also contained a cover of Robert Palmer's "Addicted to Love" recorded in a karaoke booth.

The 1987 Sonic Youth album Sister was a loose concept album partly inspired by the life and works of science fiction writer Philip K. Dick. The "sister" of the title was Dick's fraternal twin, who died shortly after her birth and whose memory haunted Dick his entire life. Sister sold 60,000 copies and received very positive reviews, becoming the first Sonic Youth album to crack the Top 20 of the Village Voice's Pazz & Jop critics' poll.

Despite their critical success, the band became dissatisfied with SST due to concerns about payments and other administrative practices. Sonic Youth decided to release their next record on Enigma Records, which was distributed by Capitol Records and partly owned by EMI. The 1988 double LP Daydream Nation was a critical success that earned Sonic Youth substantial acclaim. The album came in second on the Village Voice Pazz & Jop poll and topped the year-end album lists at NME, CMJ, and Melody Maker. In 2005, it was one of 50 recordings chosen by the Library of Congress to be added to the National Recording Registry. The lead single from the album, "Teen Age Riot", was their first song to receive significant airplay on modern rock and college rock radio, and reached number 20 on the Billboard Modern Rock Tracks chart. A number of prominent music periodicals including Rolling Stone hailed Daydream Nation as one of the best albums of the decade; Rolling Stone named Sonic Youth as the "Hot Band" in its "Hot" issue. Distribution problems subsequently arose, and Daydream Nation was often difficult to find in stores; the band began looking to leave Enigma, which Moore deemed a "cheap-jack Mafioso outfit", for a major label.

=== Major label career and becoming alternative icons: 1990–1999 ===
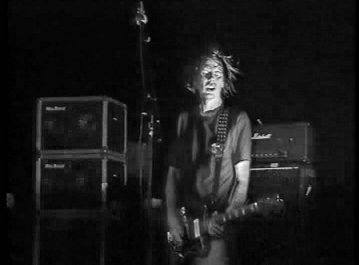
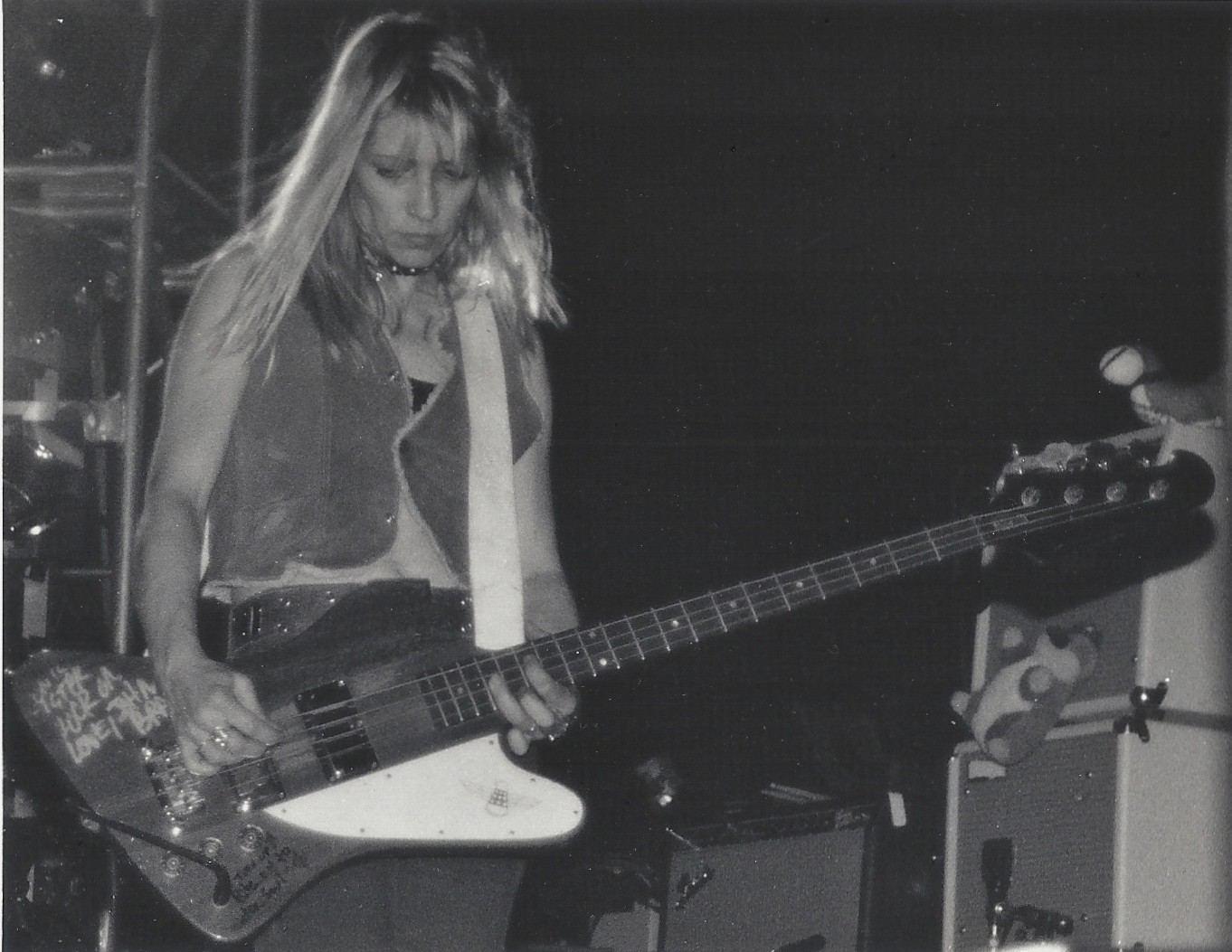
Moore and Gordon performing in the early 1990s

In 1990, Sonic Youth released Goo, their first album on the Geffen Records subsidiary DGC. The album featured the single "Kool Thing", on which rapper Chuck D of Public Enemy made a guest appearance. The record was considered much more accessible than their previous works and became their best-selling record to date.

In 1992, the band released Dirty. Their influence as tastemakers continued with their discovery of acclaimed skate video director Spike Jonze, who they recruited for the video for "100%", which also featured skateboarder turned actor Jason Lee. That song and "JC" discuss the murder of Joe Cole, a friend of the band who worked with Black Flag as a roadie. The album features artwork by Los Angeles–based artist Mike Kelley. Dirty featured a guest appearance by Ian MacKaye of Fugazi on the track "Youth Against Fascism". In 1993, the band contributed a live version of the track "The Burning Spear" from their debut EP to the AIDS benefit album No Alternative, produced by the Red Hot Organization.

In 1994, the band released Experimental Jet Set, Trash and No Star, their best-charting release in the United States to date at No. 34 on the Billboard 200. Moore and Gordon's daughter, Coco Hayley Gordon Moore, was born later that year, and many of the songs from the album were never played live because there was never a full tour to support the album due to Gordon's pregnancy. In 1994, the band released a cover of the Carpenters' 1971 hit "Superstar" for the tribute album If I Were a Carpenter. The band headlined the 1995 Lollapalooza festival with Hole and Pavement. By that time, alternative rock had gained considerable mainstream attention, and the festival was parodied in The Simpsons episode "Homerpalooza" in 1996, which featured the band members as themselves. They also performed a version of "The Simpsons Theme" which played over the episode's end credits.

The album Washing Machine was released in 1995 and represented a shift in Sonic Youth's sound, away from their punk rock roots and toward experimental and longer arrangements with extensive improvisation. Starting in 1997 they released a series of improvisational albums grouped under the title SYR with song titles and liner notes in various languages. SYR3: Invito al ĉielo, released in 1998, featured Jim O'Rourke, who later became an official band member. Various songs from the SYR series were added to Sonic Youth's live performances, and others inspired tracks on the next proper Sonic Youth album, A Thousand Leaves, released in 1998.

=== Later DGC period: 2000–2006 ===
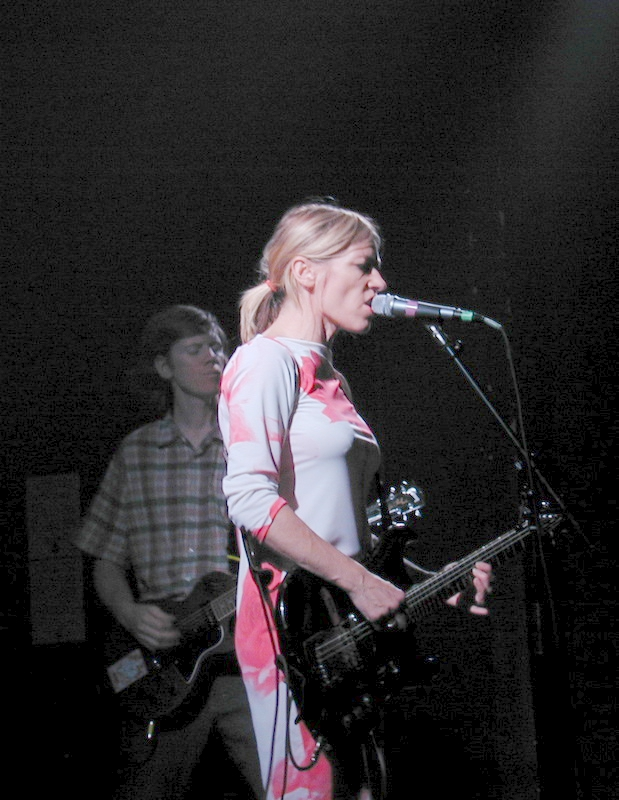
Sonic Youth performing in Copenhagen in 2000

On July 4, 1999, Sonic Youth's instruments and stage equipment were stolen from their tour van in Orange County, California. Almost 30 guitars and basses were stolen; some were recovered over the next 13 years. Forced to start from scratch with new instruments, they released the O'Rourke-produced album NYC Ghosts & Flowers in 2000 and opened for Pearl Jam during the East Coast leg of that band's 2000 US tour.

In 2001, Sonic Youth collaborated with French avant-garde singer and poet Brigitte Fontaine on her album Kékéland. The following year, they participated in the first outing of the All Tomorrow's Parties music festival and curated the ensuing compilation album. Murray Street, their first album with O'Rourke as an official member, was released in 2002. During this period the band participated in the production of the 2004 documentary film Kill Your Idols, directed and produced by Scott Crary and covering the history of punk rock in New York City.

In 2003, Sonic Youth released a split 7-inch single with Erase Errata. The next Sonic Youth album, Sonic Nurse, was released the following year. The band was slated to perform in the 2004 Lollapalooza tour along with acts such as the Pixies and the Flaming Lips, but the tour was canceled due to lackluster ticket sales. O'Rourke departed in 2006 and was replaced by Pavement bassist Mark Ibold, who had played with Gordon in Free Kitten, for touring purposes; Ibold later became a full-time member.

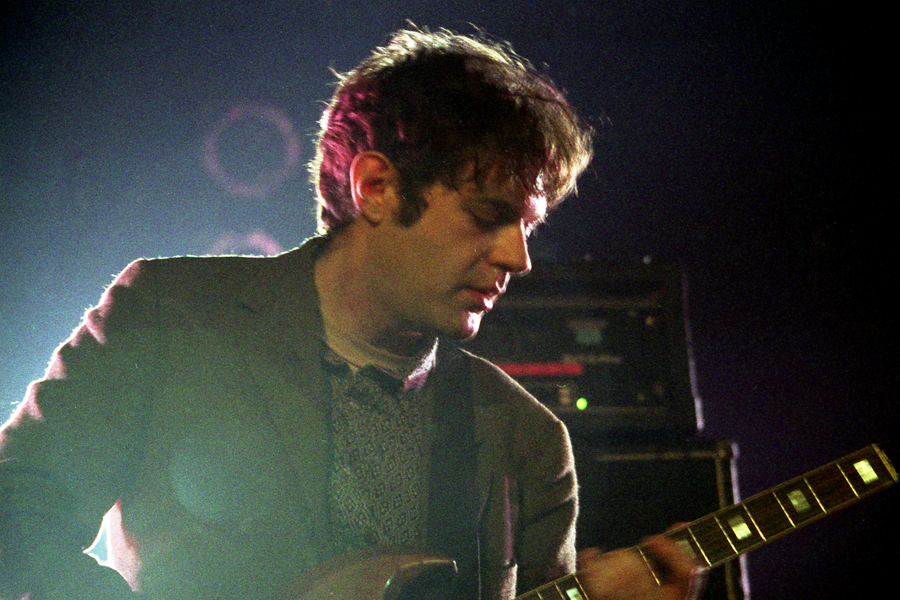
Jim O'Rourke performing with Sonic Youth in 2004. O'Rourke was an official fifth member of the band from 1999 to 2005.

Rather Ripped was released in 2006 and was noted as a return to the band's earlier alternative rock sound, due both to the departure of O'Rourke and the recovery of some of the instruments that had been stolen in 1999. On May 9, 2006, Gordon and Moore made a guest appearance on Gilmore Girls (season 6, episode 22), performing an acoustic version of their new song, "What a Waste", alongside their daughter Coco. Sonic Youth played the Bonnaroo Festival later that year. In December 2006 they released The Destroyed Room: B-Sides and Rarities. The compilation featured tracks previously available only on vinyl, tracks from limited-release compilations, B-sides to international singles, and some material that had never before been released. This marked the band's final Geffen release.

=== Matador period: 2007–2011 ===
In 2007, the band became one of the earliest big-name Western rock bands to play in China when they were brought in for a tour by Split Works. In 2008 they released a compilation album on Starbucks Music, called Hits Are for Squares, with the tracks selected by other musicians and celebrities. Later in 2008, Sonic Youth ended their relationship with Geffen, due to dissatisfaction with how the label had promoted their last several albums. They then signed with independent label Matador Records, which released the album The Eternal in 2009. During this period they collaborated with John Paul Jones on the soundtrack for a performance by the Merce Cunningham Dance Company in honor of Cunningham, who had recently passed.

In 2010 the band scored the French thriller-drama film Simon Werner a Disparu, which premiered at the Cannes Film Festival. The soundtrack was released in 2011 as SYR9: Simon Werner a Disparu, which would be the band's final official release of new material.

=== Disbandment: 2011–2013 ===
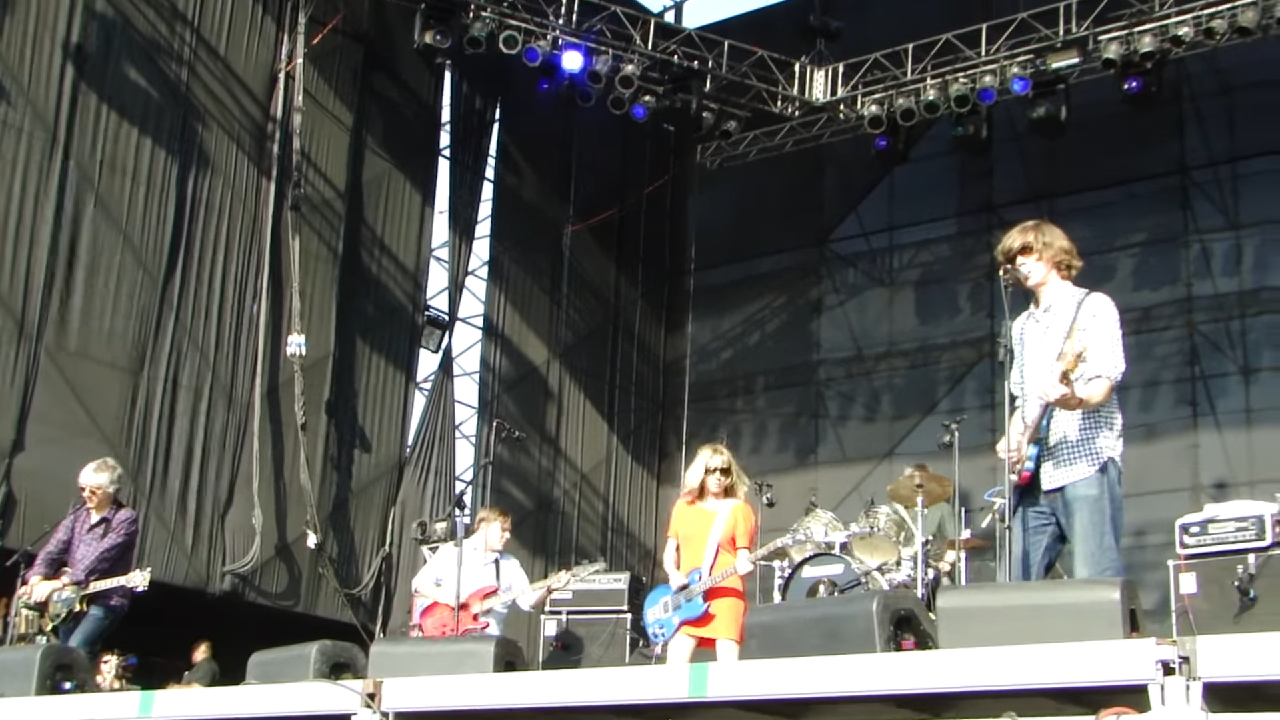
Sonic Youth performing in Santiago, Chile, in November 2011, on their final tour

On October 14, 2011, Gordon and Moore announced that they had separated after 27 years of marriage. Gordon later revealed that the couple had split following her discovery that Moore was having an affair with artist Eva Prinz, whom he married in 2020. Sonic Youth's label Matador explained that plans for the band remained "uncertain", despite previously hinting that they would record new material later in the year. The band performed their final concert on November 14, 2011, at the SWU Music & Arts Festival in Paulínia, São Paulo, Brazil. The following week, Lee Ranaldo stated in an interview that Sonic Youth would be "ending for a while".

=== Post-disbandment activities: 2013–present ===
In November 2013, when asked about the possibility of the band reuniting, Ranaldo stated: "I fear not. Everybody is busy with their own projects, besides that Thurston and Kim aren't getting along together very well since their split… Let [the band] rest in peace". In May 2014, Moore asserted that "Sonic Youth is on hiatus. The band is a democracy of sorts, and as long as Kim and I are working out our situation, the band can't really function reasonably". In her 2015 autobiography Girl in a Band, Gordon referred several times to the band having "split up" for good.

During the COVID-19 pandemic in 2020, Sonic Youth sold official face masks based on the artwork from the album Sonic Nurse, with proceeds going to two Brooklyn-based charities and US Representative Alexandria Ocasio-Cortez's COVID-19 Relief Fund. The same year, an extensive archive of live recordings from throughout the band's history was released on Bandcamp.

In January 2022, a new single "In & Out" was released ahead of the March release of the rarities EP In/out/In. The five-track EP featured previously unissued outtakes recorded between 2000 and 2010.

In October 2023, Moore's Sonic Life: A Memoir was published by Doubleday.

== Artistry ==
=== Musical style and influences ===
Sonic Youth is considered a pioneering band in the noise rock and alternative rock genres. Their music has also been labelled experimental rock, indie rock, post-punk and art rock. The band's releases have been described as "genre-defying". Andrew Daly of Guitar World magazine wrote that "Lee Ranaldo and Thurston Moore sought to tear down the idea of guitar-driven music completely. [...] The pair's viewpoint on their instruments was fresh, vivid and untethered to all established norms".

Sonic Youth's major influences included the Velvet Underground, the Stooges, MC5, Glenn Branca, Rhys Chatham, Ornette Coleman, John Coltrane, La Monte Young, Neil Young, Yoko Ono, Brigitte Fontaine, Patti Smith, Wire, My Bloody Valentine and Public Image Ltd.

The band was also influenced by 1980s hardcore punk; after seeing Minor Threat perform in May 1982, Moore declared them "the greatest live band I have ever seen". He also saw the Faith performing in 1981 and had a strong admiration towards their records. While recognizing that their own music was very different from hardcore, Moore and Gordon, especially, were impressed by hardcore's speed and intensity, and by the nationwide network of musicians and fans. "It was great", said Moore, "the whole thing with slam dancing and stage diving, that was far more exciting than pogoing and spitting. [...] I thought hardcore was very musical and very radical".

Moore and Ranaldo often expressed admiration for Joni Mitchell. Moore stated: "Joni Mitchell! I've used elements of her songwriting and guitar playing, and no one would ever know about it". As with Sonic Youth, Mitchell has always used a number of alternative guitar tunings. The Daydream Nation track "Hey Joni" is a tribute to Mitchell. Members of the band have also maintained relationships with other avant-garde artists from other genres and even other media, drawing influence from the work of avant-garde composers such as John Cage and Henry Cowell.

=== Alternative tunings ===
Trying to summarize the music of Sonic Youth with just one tuning is an exercise in noisy futility. The pioneering art rock outfit took advantage of countless unconventional and angular tunings through their run, frequently blending multiple dissonant tunings from different guitarists within one track. [...] The sheer multiplicity of tunings that Sonic Youth used caused all sorts of logistical hurdles for the band. They used cheap guitars that could only function in certain detuned ways and famously used drumsticks and screwdrivers on their guitars to achieve even more adventurous sounds and effects.

— Dan Orkin, Reverb.com

Sonic Youth's sound relied heavily on their use of bespoke alternative guitar tunings. Scordatura on stringed instruments has been used for centuries, and alternative guitar tunings had been used for decades in blues music, and to a limited degree in rock music (such as Lou Reed's ostrich guitar). Michael Azerrad writes that early in their career, "[Sonic Youth] could only afford cheap guitars, and cheap guitars sounded like cheap guitars. But with weird tunings or something jammed under a particular fret, those humble instruments could sound rather amazing – bang a drum stick on a cheap Japanese Stratocaster copy in the right tuning, crank the amplifier to within an inch of its life and it will sound like church bells."

The tunings were painstakingly developed by Moore and Ranaldo during the band's rehearsals; Moore once reported that the odd tunings were an attempt to introduce new sounds: "When you're playing in standard tuning all the time [...] things sound pretty standard". Rather than re-tune for every song, Sonic Youth generally used a particular guitar for one or two songs, and would take dozens of instruments on tour. This would be the source of much trouble for the band, as live performances of many songs relied on specific guitars that have been uniquely prepared or otherwise altered for those exact songs.

== Legacy and impact ==
Sonic Youth's influence is widespread across the spectrum of alternative and underground music. The staff of Spin wrote, "It's hard to imagine where we would be without Sonic Youth. It's unlikely another smart post-punk band founded around the same time—Big Black, the Meat Puppets—could have delivered us from hardcore's fury quite the same way. What would indie rock sound like if Sonic Youth's sublime din hadn't enchanted and derailed all the college rock bands of the mid-'80s? We would have only been left with a bunch of sanguine Feelies rip offs, never having the chance to divulge a crush via careful mixtape placement of 'Shadow of A Doubt'". Jeff Terich of Stereogum wrote, "No artist did more for noise rock's reputation—or for that matter noise's reputation—than Sonic Youth. They brought it to a wider audience, made a handful of hit alt-rock singles out of it, crashed grunge as it was happening, and became a beloved institution, despite the fact that the bulk of their catalog features some pretty weird stuff. ... Their noise wasn't just unique—no other band could replicate it". Heather Phares of AllMusic wrote, "As they redefined what noise meant within rock & roll – and what success meant for a band with experimental roots – Sonic Youth became one of the most influential, and popular, acts to emerge from the American underground. Their inventive use of alternate tunings, dissonance, and feedback, which they combined with the intensity of hardcore punk and the performance art aesthetic of New York's avant-garde, created a new sonic landscape with an impact that lasted for decades".

Sonic Youth greatly influenced the grunge band Nirvana, both in their musical style and their decision to sign with DGC Records for the release of Nevermind; bassist Krist Novoselic once said the band's goal was "to do as good as Sonic Youth". Stephen Malkmus, frontman of indie rock band Pavement, drew inspiration from Sonic Youth for his guitar technique, and has credited the band with giving him "the idea and courage" to explore alternate tunings. Sleater-Kinney have also cited Sonic Youth as an influence, particularly on their detuned guitar sound. Swervedriver have cited the band as an inspiration, with frontman Adam Franklin noting that he plays Fender Jazzmasters guitars in part because that model was favored by Sonic Youth. Other bands and artists who have cited Sonic Youth as an influence include Mauro Pezzente of Godspeed You! Black Emperor, Shane Embury of Napalm Death, Slowdive, Dinosaur Jr., Teenage Fanclub, Mogwai, Placebo frontman Brian Molko, Quicksand and Rival Schools frontman Walter Schreifels, Ride, the Notwist, Jawbreaker, ...And You Will Know Us by the Trail of Dead, Polvo, Something for Kate, Superchunk, Metz, Jawbox, Fugazi, Pg. 99, Beabadoobee, and Treepeople.

== Members ==
=== Final lineup ===
- Kim Gordon – vocals, bass, guitar (1981–2011)
- Thurston Moore – vocals, guitar (1981–2011)
- Lee Ranaldo – guitar, vocals, occasional keyboards (1981–2011)
- Steve Shelley – drums (1985–2011)
- Mark Ibold – bass, guitar (2006–2011)

=== Previous members ===
- Anne DeMarinis – keyboards, vocals, guitar (1981)
- Richard Edson – drums (1981–1982)
- Bob Bert – drums (1982, 1983–1985)
- Jim Sclavunos – drums (1982–1983)
- Jim O'Rourke – bass, guitar, keyboards, synthesizers (1999–2005)

== Discography ==
=== Studio albums ===
- Sonic Youth (1982) (Note: Released as a studio EP/mini-album, and is considered by the band to be their "first studio album" despite its classification.)
- Confusion Is Sex (1983)
- Bad Moon Rising (1985)
- EVOL (1986)
- Sister (1987)
- Daydream Nation (1988)
- The Whitey Album (1989) (Note: Released under the name Ciccone Youth, an experimental side project which also involved Mike Watt and J Mascis.)
- Goo (1990)
- Dirty (1992)
- Experimental Jet Set, Trash and No Star (1994)
- Washing Machine (1995)
- A Thousand Leaves (1998)
- NYC Ghosts & Flowers (2000)
- Murray Street (2002)
- Sonic Nurse (2004)
- Rather Ripped (2006)
- The Eternal (2009)

== Bibliography ==
- Azerrad, Michael (2001). Our Band Could Be Your Life. New York: Little, Brown.
- Browne, David (2008). Goodbye 20th Century: A Biography of Sonic Youth. Da Capo Press. ISBN 978-0-306-81515-7.
- Chick, Steve (2007). Psychic Confusion: The Sonic Youth Story. Omnibus Press.
- Foege, Alec (1994). Confusion Is Next: The Sonic Youth Story. New York: St. Martin's Press. ISBN 9780312113698.
- Ignacio, Julia; Gonzalo, Jaime (1994). Sonic Youth: I Dreamed of Noise. Barcelona: RUTA 66.
- George-Warren, Holly; Romanowski, Patricia, eds. (2005). "Sonic Youth". The Rolling Stone Encyclopedia of Rock & Roll. New York City, New York: Fireside. ISBN 978-0-7432-9201-6.
- Neal, Charles, ed. (1987). Tape Delay: Confessions from the Eighties Underground. SAF Publishing Ltd. pp. 93–103. ISBN 978-0-946719-02-0 – via the Internet Archive.
- Prendergrast, Mark (2000). The Ambient Century: From Mahler to Trance, the Evolution of Sound in the Electronic Age. Bloomsbury. ISBN 978-1-58234-134-7.
- Wild, Peter, ed. (2008). The Empty Page: Fiction Inspired by Sonic Youth. Serpent's Tail. ISBN 978-1-85242-956-0.
