= Wawrzyniak =

Wawrzyniak is a Polish surname, a patronymic from the personal name Wawrzyniec, anglicized as Lawrence and may refer to:

- Andrzej Wawrzyniak (1931–2020), Polish diplomat and art collector
- Édouard Wawrzyniak (1912–1991), French footballer of Polish origin
- Jakub Wawrzyniak (born 1983), Polish footballer
- Martynka Wawrzyniak (born 1979), Polish photographer and model
- Piotr Wawrzyniak (1849–1910), Polish priest and activist
- Rashontae Wawrzyniak (born 1990), American beauty pageant titleholder
- Stanley Wawrzyniak (1927–1995), American Marine and Navy Cross recipient
- Władysław Wawrzyniak (1890–1940), Polish military commander
