= Bad Moon Rising (album) =

1985 studio album by Sonic Youth

Studio album by Sonic Youth
- Released: March 29, 1985
- Recorded: September–December 1984
- Studios: Before Christ Studios, Brooklyn, New York
- Genres: Noise rock; no wave; experimental rock
- Length: 37:33
- Labels: Blast First; Homestead
- Producers: Sonic Youth; Martin Bisi; John Erskine

Sonic Youth chronology
Sonic Death (1984)	Bad Moon Rising (1985)	EVOL (1986)

Sonic Youth studio album chronology
Confusion Is Sex (1983)	Bad Moon Rising (1985)	EVOL (1986)

Singles from Bad Moon Rising
- 1. "Death Valley '69" Released: December 1984; 2. "Flower"/"Satan Is Boring" Released: 1985; 3. "Flower"/"Halloween" Released: 1985; 4. "Halloween II" Released: 1986

Bad Moon Rising is the second studio album by American rock band Sonic Youth, released on March 29, 1985, by Blast First and Homestead Records, named after the 1969 song "Bad Moon Rising" by Creedence Clearwater Revival. The album is loosely themed around the dark side of America, including references to obsession, insanity, Charles Manson, heavy metal, Satanism, and early European settlers' encounters with Native Americans.

The album was released after a string of underground successes in Sonic Youth, Confusion is Sex, and Kill Yr. Idols, as well as increasing popularity as a touring act. Despite this, the band sought to change course with their sound, creating an album more influenced by Noise Rock with diluted No Wave influences. Additionally, Bad Moon Rising was the band's first album to combine experimental material with transitional pieces and segues.

Released to strong reviews from the underground music press, the album continues to receive acclaim. Four singles were released, the first of which being "Death Valley '69", a collaboration with Lydia Lunch which did not chart in either the US or UK (the track was re-recorded for the album and released again as a single in June 1985).

== Background ==
Sonic Youth was formed in New York City in 1981 by guitarists Thurston Moore and Lee Ranaldo and bass guitarist Kim Gordon. The band signed to Glenn Branca's Neutral Records, releasing the Sonic Youth EP in March 1982. As Sonic Youth released a number of albums and EPs to increasing critical acclaim, including Confusion Is Sex and Kill Yr. Idols in 1983, several drummers joined and left the band. Bob Bert rejoined Sonic Youth after the Confusion Is Sex tour in mid-1983. The New York press largely ignored Sonic Youth (as well as the noise rock scene in the city), until after a disastrous London debut in October 1983 that actually received rave reviews in British papers Sounds and NME. When they returned to New York, the queue at CBGB for the band's concerts went around the block.

By mid-1984, Sonic Youth were playing almost weekly in the city, but its members started to realize that there was little future in their musical approach; Moore later said, "it was getting to the point of overkill". They retreated to the rehearsal room, retuned their guitars and changed their equipment so that they were unable to play their old songs, and began writing new material.

After a period of intense songwriting, the band entered producer Martin Bisi's BC Studio – implicitly, "Before Christ Studio", which is how the band credited it on the album – in Brooklyn, New York in September 1984. Bisi had recorded early rappers and local avant-garde musicians such as John Zorn, Elliott Sharp and Bill Laswell.

== Music ==
Bad Moon Rising's style has been described as noise rock, no wave and experimental rock. The album begins with "Intro", a short instrumental featuring several guitars, described by Michael Azerrad as "a melancholic, meowing slide line playing off a delicate stack of crystalline arpeggios." "Intro" segues into the song "Brave Men Run (In My Family)". The song begins with a single riff repeating for a minute, before Gordon sings "Brave men run, in my family" and ending with "Brave men run, away from me." The riff fades into the album's third song, "Society Is a Hole", "a one-chord hymn to big-city anomie".

Sonic Youth's use of transitional pieces in the album was inspired by their live shows, which featured either Moore or Ranaldo tuning guitars for up to five minutes while the other played slow transitory guitar riffs or prerecorded sound collages.

"I Love Her All the Time" features extensive prepared guitar by Ranaldo and the use of one chord, with a noise section in the middle; like many of the album's songs, it focuses on texture and rhythm rather than melody. The second side of Bad Moon Rising, which comprises the experimental "Ghost Bitch" (which features Ranaldo on acoustic guitar and references Native Americans' first encounter with European settlers), "I'm Insane" and "Justice is Might", expands on the soundscape concept; the songs feature repeating guitar riffs that segue from one song to the next, while Moore and Gordon read cryptic lyrics.

"Death Valley '69", the album's closer, was the result of a collaboration between Moore and New York singer and poet Lydia Lunch. Describing the album's style, Pitchfork called it "not so much a collection of songs as it is an extended, unending uproar, seamless in sound and theme."

== Release ==
The album was released on March 29, 1985, in the United States, preceded by the first of four singles: Death Valley '69, accompanied by the band's first music video. The album was reissued in 2015 in the United States.

The album's cover is a photograph by artist James Welling of a scarecrow with a flaming jack-o'-lantern as its head.

== Critical reception ==
Professional ratings
Review scores
Source	Rating
AllMusic	3/5 stars
Blender	2/5 stars
Chicago Tribune	2.5/4 stars
Encyclopedia of Popular Music	3/5 stars
Entertainment Weekly	B
Pitchfork	8.1/10
Q	3/5 stars
The Rolling Stone Album Guide	3/5 stars
Spin Alternative Record Guide	5/10
The Village Voice	B

Robert Palmer of The New York Times hailed Bad Moon Rising as one of the year's ten best albums, ranking it at #4 while praising Sonic Youth for "making the most startlingly original guitar-based music since Jimi Hendrix - using only cheap guitars, ordinary amplifiers and all the untried tunings and harmonic combinations their hyperactive imaginations can devise."

AllMusic noted the album's dark nature, writing: "An album quite unlike any other in the colorful Sonic Youth canon, Bad Moon Rising captures the New York band in 1985 during its most morose phase, one that is quite forbidding yet fascinating all the same." Trouser Press wrote that it "[exudes] all the horrible beauty of a mushroom cloud on the horizon." Pitchfork described the album's aesthetic as "compelling."

Byron Coley of Spin wrote, "An aural portrait of the band that is less single-mindedly violent than its immediate precursors. The ker-unch of guitars-as-battling-bulldozers is certainly the sound around which the record coils."

=== Accolades ===
Bad Moon Rising ranked at No. 42 in Alternative Press's list of the greatest albums of 1985–1995, surpassing Daydream Nation.

== Track listing ==
All tracks are written by Sonic Youth (Kim Gordon, Thurston Moore, Lee Ranaldo, and Bob Bert), except "Death Valley '69" by Sonic Youth and Lydia Lunch.

Side A
No.	Title	Vocals	Length
1.	"Intro"	Instrumental	1:10
2.	"Brave Men Run (In My Family)"	Gordon	3:37
3.	"Society Is a Hole"	Moore	5:57
4.	"I Love Her All the Time"	Moore	7:27

Side B
No.	Title	Vocals	Length
5.	"Ghost Bitch"	Gordon	5:20
6.	"I'm Insane"	Moore	4:07
7.	"Justice Is Might"	Moore	4:21
8.	"Death Valley '69"	Lunch and Moore	5:10

CD bonus tracks
No.	Title	Length
9.	"Satan Is Boring"	5:06
10.	"Flower"	3:36
11.	"Halloween"	5:11
12.	"Echo Canyon"	1:08

- Tracks 10 and 11 are reversed on some CD pressings
- Track 12 is not included on the 1989 first CD pressing by Blast First

== Personnel ==
Sonic Youth

- Thurston Moore – guitars, prepared guitar, lead vocals, production
- Lee Ranaldo – guitars, percussion ("Ghost Bitch"), backing vocals ("Death Valley '69"), production
- Kim Gordon – bass guitar, lead vocals, backing vocals ("Death Valley '69"), production
- Bob Bert – drums, production

Additional personnel

- Lydia Lunch – lead vocals and production on "Death Valley '69"

Production

- Martin Bisi – engineer, producer (all tracks except 10–11)
- Ethan James – engineer (tracks 10–11)
- John Erskine – producer (all tracks except 10–11)

== Release history ==
Region	Date	Format	Label	Catalog number
United States	1985	LP	Blast First/Homestead	BFFP L/HMS 016
United Kingdom	1985	LP, CS, CD	Blast First	BFFP 1
Germany	1985	LP	Torso	
United States	1993	CD	Geffen	DBCD 24512
Europe	1993	CD	Geffen	GED 24512
United Kingdom	1996	LP	Rough Trade	
United States	2015	CD	Goofin'	
