= Choad =

Choad may refer to:

- Titled works:
  - "Choad", song by Dead Hot Workshop
  - "Choad", song from Harshing My Mellow by Bewitched
- Slang terms:
  - For penis
  - For perineum

== See also ==
- Chode, or Kyoad, a language of Ghana
- Chode McBlob, a character from Tripping the Rift
