= The Worst Poetry of 1986–1993 =

Studio album by Bewitched
- Released: 2006
- Recorded: 1986–1993
- Genre: Noise rock
- Length: 49:12
- Label: B.B Gun

Bewitched chronology
Harshing My Mellow (1991)	The Worst Poetry of 1986–1993 (2006)

The Worst Poetry of 1986–1993 is a compilation by Bewitched, released in 2006 by B.B Gun. Released over a decade after the band's demise, the album compiles tracks taken from singles coupled with songs from the band's two studio albums, all of which were remastered by Wharton Tiers. The cover art pays homage to the independently produced and recorded vanity records of the 1960s, such as the infamous Philosophy of the World by The Shaggs.

== Track listing ==
All tracks are written by Bewitched.

No.	Title	From album (date)	Length
1.	"Neon Angel"	Brain Eraser (1990)	2:15
2.	"Sky Skag"	Brain Eraser (1990)	4:00
3.	"409"	Harshing My Mellow (1991)	2:55
4.	"Junket's Theme"	409 7" (1991)	3:57
5.	"No. 1"	Harshing My Mellow (1991)	3:27
6.	"I Dunno What to Do"	Brain Eraser (1990)	5:09
7.	"Orange Owsley"	Harshing My Mellow (1991)	3:00
8.	"Hey White Homey"	Hey White Homey 7" (1993)	3:11
9.	"Drain"	Brain Eraser (1990)	5:24
10.	"Making Out With Satan"	Makin' Out With Satan/Outta My Face 7" (1993)	3:14
11.	"Swamp Shoot"	Chocolate Frenzy 7" (1986)	8:51
12.	"Chocolate Frenzy"	Chocolate Frenzy 7" (1986)	3:48

== Personnel ==
Adapted from The Worst Poetry of 1986–1993 liner notes.

Bewitched

- Bob Bert – drums, lead vocals (1, 3, 5, 7, 8, 10), tape (11, 12), marimba (12)
- Donna Croughn – violin (6, 8, 9), bass guitar (8), vocals (8)
- DJ David Cream of Wheat P – turntables (1–7, 9)
- Jim Fu – electric guitar (1–4, 6, 9)
- Chris Ward – bass guitar (1–7, 9)

Additional musicians

- Peter Aaron – electric guitar (11, 12)
- Mark Cunningham – trumpet (11)
- Tad Doyle – spoken word (6)
- Daisy von Firth – backing vocals (7)
- Thurston Moore – spoken word (6)

Additional musicians (cont.)

- Art Reinitz – electric guitar (11)
- Dave Rick – electric guitar (11, 12), bass guitar (11, 12)
- Suzanne Sasic – vocals (12)
- Jerry Teel – bass guitar (10)
- William Weber – electric guitar (10)

Production and additional personnel

- Steve Albini – recording (3, 5, 7)
- Roli Mosimann – mixing (11, 12)
- J. G. Thirlwell – mixing (11, 12)
- Wharton Tiers – remastering, recording (1, 2, 6, 7, 9, 11, 12)
- Mark Venezia – recording (10)
- Peter Ziebel – cover art

== Release history ==
Region	Date	Label	Format	Catalog
United States	2006	B.B Gun	CD	001
