= Death Valley '69 =

1984 single by Sonic Youth

Single by Sonic Youth featuring Lydia Lunch

from the album Bad Moon Rising
- B-side: "Brave Men Run (In My Family)"
- Released: December 1984
- Recorded: July 1984
- Genre: Noise rock, no wave
- Label: Iridescence
- Songwriters: Robert Bertelli, Kim Gordon, Thurston Moore, Lee Ranaldo, Lydia Lunch
- Producers: Sonic Youth, Clint Ruin

Sonic Youth single singles chronology
"Death Valley '69" (1984)	"Flower" (1985)

Death Valley '69

EP by Sonic Youth featuring Lydia Lunch
- Released: June 1985
- Genres: Noise rock, no wave
- Labels: Blast First, Homestead

Sonic Youth EP chronology
Kill Yr Idols (1983)	''Death Valley '69'' (1985)	Master-Dik (1987)

Professional ratings
Review scores
Source	Rating
AllMusic	3/5 stars
The Rolling Stone Album Guide	2/5 stars

"Death Valley '69" is a song by American alternative rock band Sonic Youth and featuring Lydia Lunch. The song was written and sung by Thurston Moore and fellow New York musician Lunch, and recorded by Martin Bisi in 1984.

A demo version of the song was released in December 1984 on Iridescence Records. A re-recorded version was released in EP format with different artwork in June 1985; this version was featured on their second studio album, Bad Moon Rising.

== Music video ==
The video for "Death Valley '69" was filmed in 1985 and was the first music video by Sonic Youth, directed by Judith Barry and Richard Kern. The video features the majority of the band in various states of bloody dismemberment interlaced with live footage of the band. It also stars alternative model Lung Leg.

The video is the only one by Sonic Youth to feature drummers Bob Bert and Steve Shelley. Bert recorded the drum parts for the song, but amicably quit the band and was replaced by Shelley by the time the video was recorded.

== Critical reception ==
The song was ranked number 10 among the "Tracks of the Year" for 1985 by NME.

Byron Coley of Spin called it, "a creepy-crawl through Spahn Ranch with guest howls by the Love Kitten of the Hate Generation" John Leland said the band, "massaged their guitars with drumsticks and screwdrivers. This is an art band playing straight up—kicking the shit out of a hairy, Stooges-type riff with no thought to subtleties. The lyrics spiral in fragments off the homicidal side of either Flannery O'Connor or benzedrine."

== Cover versions ==
Soundgarden included a sample of the song on the track "Smokestack Lightning" from the band's Ultramega OK album in 1988.

The italian comedy punk band Karashow included a 1'39" version of the song in their 2009 release Killer HH.

== Track listing ==
1984 version

1. "Death Valley '69" – 5:32
2. "Brave Men Run (In My Family)" – 3:48

1985 version

1. "Death Valley '69"
2. "I Dream I Dreamed"
3. "Inhuman"
4. "Brother James"
5. "Satan Is Boring"

== Personnel ==
Sonic Youth

- Thurston Moore – guitar, lead vocals, production
- Kim Gordon – bass guitar, production, backing vocals
- Lee Ranaldo – guitar, backing vocals, production
- Bob Bert – drums, production

Additional personnel

- Lydia Lunch – lead vocals, production

Technical

- Martin Bisi – engineering, production
- John Erskine – engineering, production
- Clint Ruin – engineering, production
