= Bob Bert =

American drummer (born 1955)

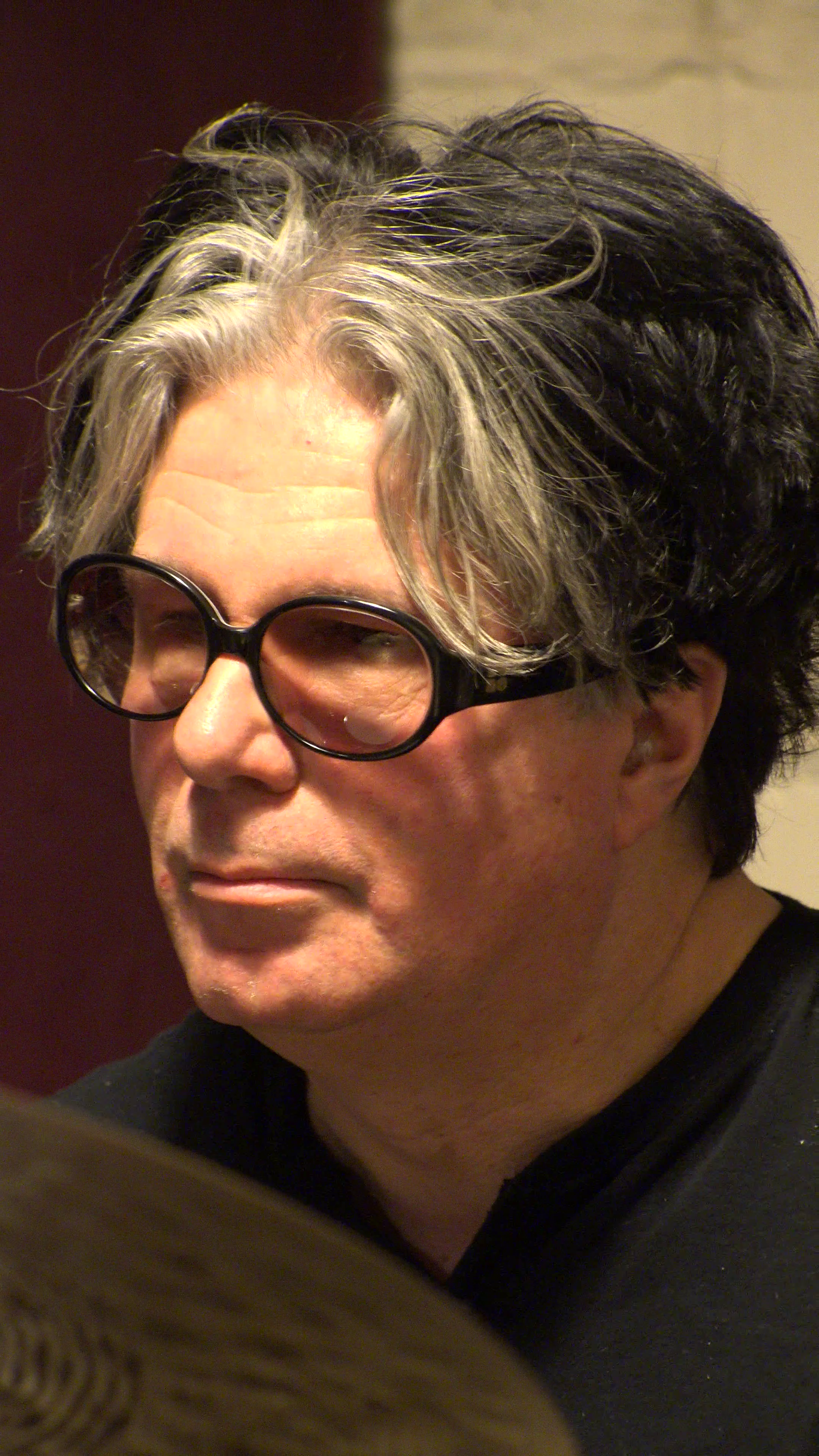
- Bert in 2016

Background information
- Born: Robert Bertelli; June 11, 1955 (age 71); Passaic, New Jersey
- Genre: Rock
- Occupations: Musician
- Instruments: Drums
- Years active: 1982-present
- Labels: Thick Syrup Records; In the Red Records

Robert Bertelli, better known professionally as Bob Bert (born June 11, 1955), is an American rock drummer.

== Biography ==
Based in Hoboken, New Jersey, Bert initially came to prominence as drummer for the experimental rock band Sonic Youth from 1982 to 1985 (although he was briefly dismissed after a US tour in 1982, rejoining early the following year). Bert played on the Sonic Youth albums Confusion Is Sex and Bad Moon Rising, in addition to the live album Sonic Death, EP Kill Yr Idols, and the singles "Death Valley '69" and "Flower". After Bad Moon Rising, Bert quit the group. His departure was amicable, and he even appeared in the music video of "Death Valley '69" alongside his replacement, Steve Shelley.

Bert contributed during the last half of the 1980s as percussionist for noise band Pussy Galore. He was a member of Action Swingers in the early 1990s.

In the early 1990s, Bert drummed for the Chrome Cranks (which also included Peter Aaron on vocals; Jerry Teel on bass; and William Weber on stun guitar).

After the dissolution of the Cranks, Bert joined forces with guitarist Kid Congo, guitarist Jack Martin, bassist/vocalist Jerry Teel and organist Barry London in the rootsy New York City band Knoxville Girls.

Throughout, Bert managed to release a handful of recordings by his percussive/concussive vehicle Bewitched. Releases by Bewitched include the Chocolate Frenzy 12" EP; some albums, including Harshing My Mellow on No. 6 Records; and the "Hey White Homie" 7" on Sub Pop. Bewitched toured with Sonic Youth and STP (short-lived NYC all-female foxcore band which included PG guitarist Julie Cafritz) during the summer of 1990, the year Goo was released.

During the late 1990s, Bert and his wife, artist Linda Wolfe, began publishing BBGun, a zine that primarily covers punk rock.

In 1998, Bert contributed the liner notes and interviewed Suicide for the reissue of the band's eponymous second album.

Bert played with Five Dollar Priest as well as with the International Shades, which features ex-Live Skull guitarist Mark C. and former Pier Platters shop assistant-turned-keyboardist Dorien Garry among others.

In 2011 Thick Syrup Records released the compilation cd Bewitched - Bob Bert Presents: The Worst Poetry Of 1986 - 1993, featuring all tracks Bob Bert recorded with Bewitched. The label also released the last album of the re-united Chrome Cranks featuring Bert on drums.

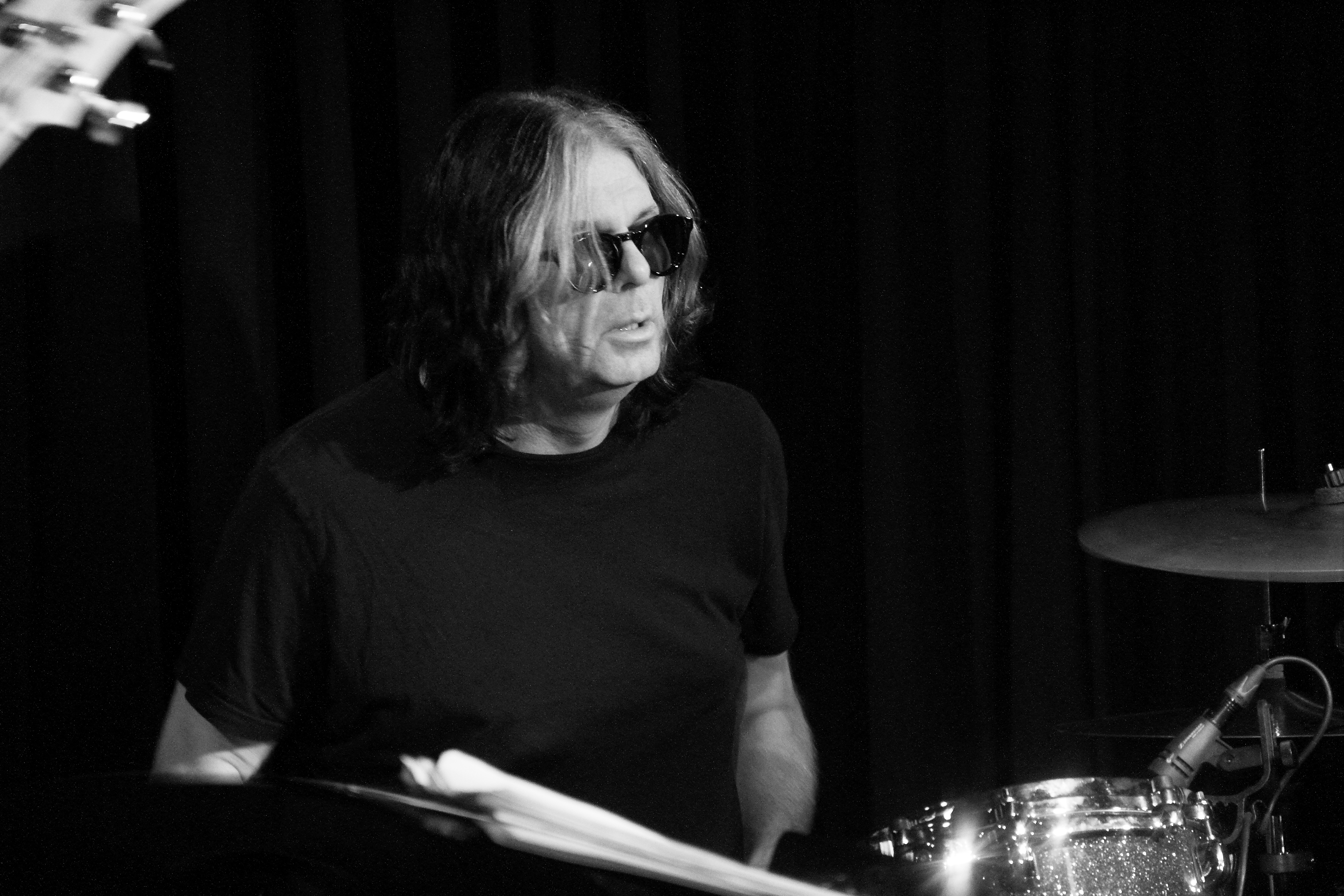
Lydia Lunch Retrovirus at Club W71, 2017

Bert is now playing with Retrovirus (Lydia Lunch, Weasel Walter, Tim Dahl), who have released studio and live albums, and also with Wolfmanhattan Project with Kid Congo Powers (The Gun Club, The Cramps, Nick Cave & the Bad Seeds, Knoxville Girls, Pink Monkey Birds) and Mick Collins (The Gories, The Dirtbombs).

In 2019, Bert released I'm Just the Drummer: My Time Behind Sonic Youth, Pussy Galore, Chrome Cranks & BB Gun Magazine, a book compiling his photographs and interviews he did with artists he collaborated with or that influenced him.

Bert's father is Angelo Bertelli, who played college and pro football, and won the Heisman Trophy in 1943.

== Discography ==
=== With Sonic Youth ===
- Confusion is Sex, 1983
- Kill Yr Idols, 1983
- Sonic Death, 1984
- Death Valley 69, 1984
- Bad Moon Rising, 1985

=== With Lee Ranaldo ===
- Between the Times and the Tides, 2012

=== Bewitched ===
- Chocolate Frenzy 12" EP
- Brain Eraser, No. 6 Records
- Harshing My Mellow, No. 6 Records
- "Hey White Homie" 7" Sub Pop.
- Bob Bert Presents: The Worst Poetry of 1986-1993, Thick Syrup Records 2011

=== Chrome Cranks ===
- Dead Cool, CD Crypt, 1995
- Love In Exile, CD PCP, 1996
- Oily Cranks, CD Atavistic Records, 1997
- Diabolical Boogie: Singles, Demos & Rarities (1992 B.C.- 1998 A.D.) CD, Atavistic Records, 2006
- Ain't No Lies In Blood CD, Thick Syrup Records 2011

=== With Lydia Lunch Retrovirus ===
- Retrovirus, Recorded live at the Knitting Factory, Brooklin, NY, Nov 15, 2012 (CD / Widowspeak, 2013)
- Urge to Kill (CD / Widowspeak / Rustblade / Brava, 2015)
- Live in Zurich (CD / Widowspeak, 2016)

=== With Wolfmanhattan Project ===
- Smells Like You, (7", In The Red Recordings, 2015)
- Blue Gene Stew, (CD/Album, In the Red Recordings, 2019)

=== With Jon Spencer and the HITMakers ===
- Spencer Gets It Lit, (Album, Bronzerat/Shove Records, 2022)
