= Bewitched (American band) =

American band

- Origin: Hoboken, New Jersey, US
- Genres: Noise rock, experimental rock
- Years active: 1986–1993
- Labels: No.6
- Past members: Bob Bert; Donna Croughn; DJ David Cream of Wheat P Jim Fu; Art Reinitz; Chris Ward

Bewitched was a noise rock musical project headed by American percussionist Bob Bert. It was founded in 1986 after Bert had left the band Sonic Youth the previous year. The project began as a solo effort but morphed to incorporate several other musicians, including violinist Donna Croughn of Tiny Lights. The music was noise rock influenced with an emphasis placed on Bert's drumming. It also incorporated turntables courtesy of DJ David Cream of Wheat P, which at the time was innovative.

== History ==
After drummer and percussionist Bob Bert amicably departed from Sonic Youth, he decided he wanted to pursue his own musical project. Concurrent to his involvement in the band Pussy Galore, Bert released the Chocolate Frenzy single in 1986 under the name Bewitched. It featured Suzanne Sasic performing vocals, Mark Cunningham on trumpet and Dave Rick on drums and was produced by Wharton Tiers at his Fun City studio in New York City. The music drew inspiration from Einstürzende Neubauten, Big Stick and the Butthole Surfers.

The project went on hiatus for four years while Bert performed a member of Pussy Galore. After they disbanded, Bert was free again to pursue his own musical ambitions and resurrected Bewitched as a quintet. Their debut Brain Eraser was released in 1990 by No.6 Records. The band then released Harshing My Mellow in 1991. AllMusic rated each album two and a half out of five stars. AllMusic reviewer Stewart Mason found two tracks of Brain Eraser "listenable enough": the song "I Dunno What to Do" and instrumental "Chuck's Got a Big One".

== Discography ==
Studio albums

- Brain Eraser (No.6, 1990)
- Harshing My Mellow (No.6, 1991)

Compilation albums

- The Worst Poetry of 1986-1993 (B.B Gun, 2006)

Singles

- Chocolate Frenzy (Shove, 1986)
- 409/Junket's Theme (No.6, 1991)
- Makin' Out With Satan/Outta My Face (Helter Skelter, 1993)
- Hey White Homey/Troll Doll (Sub Pop, 1993)
