= Flower (Sonic Youth song) =

Single by Sonic Youth
- B-side: "Satan Is Boring" (original 12"), "Halloween" (second 12"), "Rewolf (Special Natas Mix)" (7")
- Released: 1985 (original 12"), January 1986 (7", second 12")
- Recorded: 1985
- Genre: No wave, noise rock
- Length: 5:11
- Label: Blast First (UK), Homestead (US)
- Songwriters: Bob Bert, Kim Gordon, Thurston Moore, Lee Ranaldo

Sonic Youth singles chronology
"Death Valley '69" (1984)	"Flower" (1985)	"Starpower" (1986)

"Flower" is a song by American alternative rock band Sonic Youth. It was originally released as a 12" single (listed as "Flower (Use the Word)") in 1985 by UK record label Blast First, with "Satan Is Boring" as the B-side. This version was quickly withdrawn at the band's request. In January 1986, Blast First and the band's American label, Homestead Records, both released "Flower" as a 12" backed by "Halloween"; the first run of the UK edition was on yellow/orange vinyl. Blast First also issued the song as a 7" single in edited form, retitled "Flower (Anti-Fuckword Radio Edit)", with a backwards version, "Rewolf (Special Natas Mix)", on the flipside.

"Flower", "Halloween" and the studio version of "Satan Is Boring" were all later included on the Geffen Records CD reissue of Sonic Youth's 1985 album Bad Moon Rising.

== Background ==
"Flower" and "Halloween" were recorded and mixed at Radio Tokyo in Venice, California in January 1985. "Satan Is Boring" was a collage of live material recorded at concerts in Rotterdam and Aylesbury in April 1985.

== Cover controversy ==
The cover of the January 1986 Blast First 12", a "smudged black-and-white photocopy of a topless model in a downward-gazing pose" taken from a calendar and previously used in Thurston Moore's fanzine Killer, caused a major controversy with Blast First's distributor, Rough Trade Records. In a section on Blast First from his book How Soon Is Now?, Richard King said of the "Flower" cover,

The sleeve was a copy-shop approximation of the kind of sleeves Raymond Pettibon was producing for the SST label in California: illustrations of blank-eyed characters of SoCal suburbia inhabiting empty spaces, both physical and mental, that despite their best efforts, consumerism and sex couldn't fill. What made sense in the context of the American underground, where such signifiers formed part of the bands' running commentary on their surroundings, had an equal resonance with Sonic Youth's connections with the Artforum sensibilities of New York galleries. In the context of Collier Street, it was given short shrift, dismissed as either a piece of New Yorker know-it-all provocation, or the kind of straightforward exploitative misogynist artwork that belonged on a heavy metal album.

== Reception ==
In his AllMusic review of Bad Moon Rising, critic Jason Birchmeier noted the inclusion of the "Flower" material, saying, "Similarly morose, these few songs are perhaps even more out-there than the Bad Moon Rising ones, especially 'Halloween', which is a subtle five minutes of creeping guitar tingles accented beautifully by Kim Gordon's whispery hallucinations".

A 2015 reassessment of Bad Moon Rising by Pitchfork's Zoe Camp noted how "Halloween" and "Flower" fit with the album's themes of "sex and power", saying, "On 'Halloween', Gordon struggles to identify just what it is that makes her succumb to a man's wiles, finally theorizing 'it’s the devil in me': the female sex drive, corrupted". Camp also said that "Flower" prefigured the riot grrrl movement of the 1990s, claiming that the song "encapsulated the sex-positive sentiments, as well as the noise, of the forthcoming movement....granted, 'Flower' might scan as slightly hippie-dippy next to Kathleen Hanna’s acerbic prose, but its mangled punk instrumentation and feminist politics set a precedent".

A retrospective on Bad Moon Rising by Sputnikmusic gave the "Flower" tracks a mixed review, opining that "Flower" and "Satan Is Boring" "amount to very little beyond vocals or drumming overtop of thick, layered distortion", but praising "Halloween", saying that Gordon's "whispered vocals create a hallucination that is accentuated perfectly with prickling guitar notes and distant-sounding drums".

== Mudhoney cover ==
"Halloween" was covered by Mudhoney for their split single with Sonic Youth, who covered Mudhoney's "Touch Me I'm Sick". "Touch Me I'm Sick" / "Halloween" was released in December 1988 by Sub Pop. Mudhoney's cover was later included on re-releases of their debut EP Superfuzz Bigmuff.

== Track listing ==
UK 12" single (Blast First, 1985)

1. "Flower (Use the Word)"
2. "Satan Is Boring" (Supermix)

UK 12" single (Blast First, 1986)

1. "Flower"
2. "Halloween"

US 12" single (Homestead Records, 1986)

1. "Flower"
2. "Halloween"

UK 7" single (Blast First, 1986)

1. "Flower (Anti-Fuckword Radio Edit)"
2. "Rewolf (Special Natas Mix)"

== Personnel ==
- Lee Ranaldo
- Kim Gordon
- Thurston Moore
- Bob Bert - drums
- Sonic Youth - producer
- Ethan James - engineer
