= "Weird Paul" Petroskey =

American musician

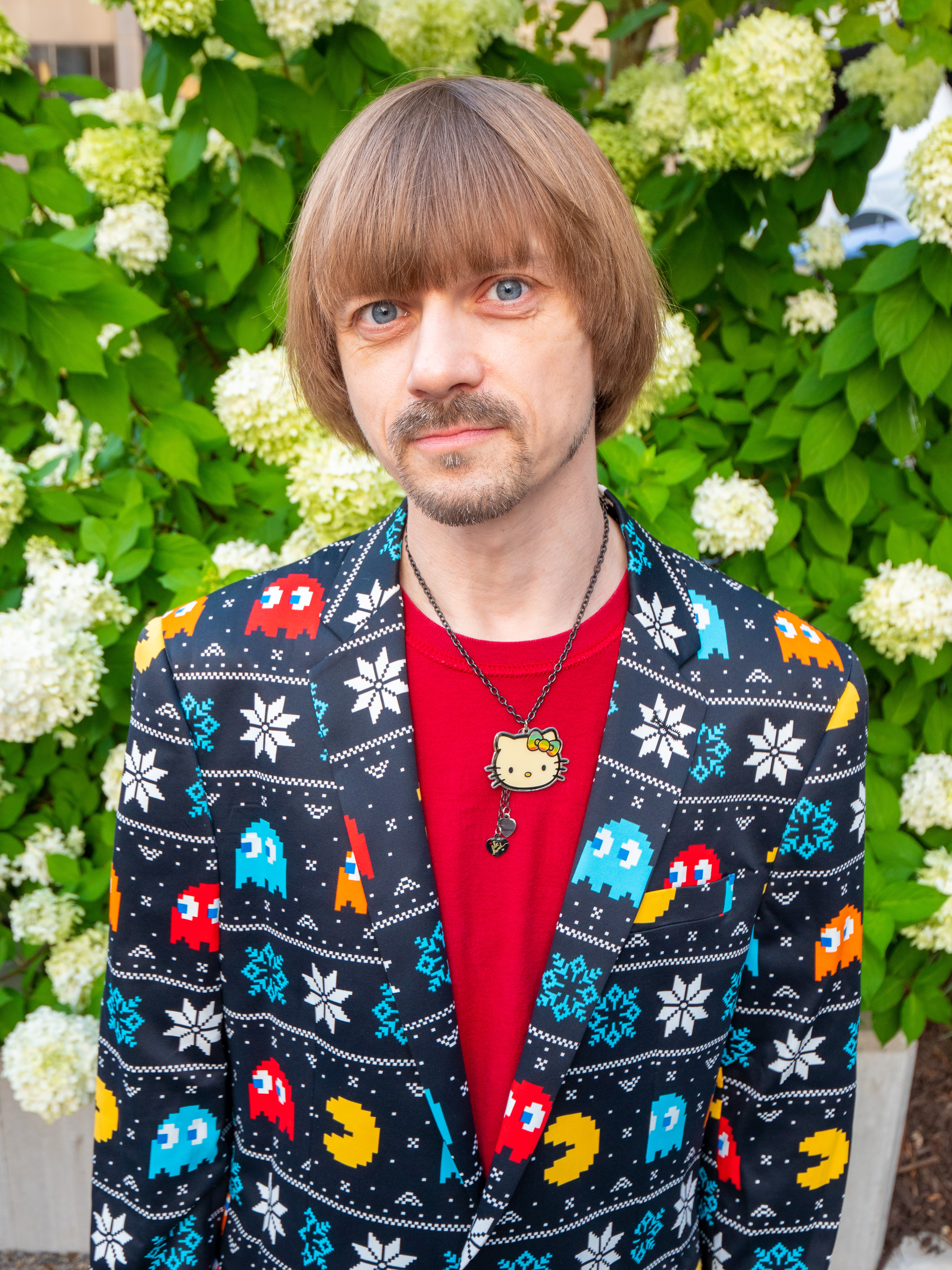
- Petroskey in 2019.

Background information
- Also known as: "Off-The-Wall" Paul, "Champ"
- Born: Paul Petroskey; November 21, 1970 (age 55)
- Origin: Bethel Park, Pennsylvania
- Genres: lo-fi, punk rock, indie rock, comedy rock, spoken word, nerd rock
- Occupations: Streamer, Musician, Spray Coater
- Instruments: Vocals, Guitar, Bass, Drums, Chord organ, Stylophone, Keyboards
- Years active: 1984-present
- Labels: Homestead Records, Rocks & Rolling, Thick Syrup Records
- Website: weirdpaul.com

"Weird" Paul Petroskey (born November 21, 1970) is a lo-fi musician, Twitch streamer, TikTok live streamer and YouTube personality in the Pittsburgh, Pennsylvania area. He has been writing and recording music since 1984, and has written or co-written over 700 songs and appeared on over 50 released albums. Petroskey has played as part of an ensemble and has performed in the bands The Blazing Bulkheads, The Blissful Idiots (which later changed their name to Revenge of the Nerds), 57 Big End Halos (Scott Fry) and The Weird Paul Rock Band.

Petroskey formed his label Rocks & Rolling Records in 1987, through which he released his first album In Case of Fire Throw This In on cassette tape. He initially called himself "Off-the-Wall Paul" in an effort to differentiate himself from "Weird Al" Yankovic. In late 1989 Petroskey began performing with drummer Manny Theiner and in 1991, signed with New York record label Homestead Records. Through Homestead Records the two released the album Lo Fidelity, Hi Anxiety, but were not picked up for a second album. The pair toured the United States to promote the album.

Between the years 2001 to 2004, Petroskey filmed a documentary with Chicago filmmaker Stacey Goldschmidt, who was creating a film about his music. Weird Paul: A Lo Fidelity Documentary was completed in 2005 and was released in April 2006, where it went on to show at the Chicago Underground Film Festival and Leeds International Film Festival. In 2015, Petroskey hosted and starred in the weekly local television series The Weird Paul Variety Show on WEPA-CD in the Pittsburgh area. The first airing was June 11, 2015.

A documentary about Petroskey was released in 2019, called Will Work for Views: The Lo-Fi Life of Weird Paul which is described as "a documentary film 30 years in the making."

== Selected discography ==
- In Case of Fire Throw This In – Rocks & Rolling Records 001 (1987)
- I Need a Pencil Sharpener – Rocks & Rolling Records 002 (1988)
- Now I Blow My A-B-C-'s – Rocks & Rolling Records 003 (1989)
- Live at the Underground – Rocks & Rolling Records 004 (1989)
- Does Anyone Want This? – Rocks & Rolling Records 007 (1989)
- Songs For Santa – Rocks & Rolling Records (1989)
- The Concept Track – Rocks & Rolling Records 008 (1990)
- My Last Tape – Rocks & Rolling Records 012 (1990)
- Lo Fidelity, Hi Anxiety – Homestead Records 166 (1991)
- Worm in My Egg Cream – Rocks & Rolling Records 015 (1994)
- Best Sled Ever – Rocks & Rolling Records 016 (1995)
- The Proliferation of Matter – Rocks & Rolling Records 017 (1996)
- The Blazing Bulkheads – Rocks & Rolling Records 018 (1998)
- The Dame That Drove Me Nuts – Rocks & Rolling Records 019 (1999)
- Your Favorite Gum – Home-Aid Recordings 005 (2000)
- Pine 'n Lose – Rocks & Rolling Records 020 (2000)
- Billy Joel Likes Cakes – Rocks & Rolling Records 021 (2000)
- 2001 – Rocks & Rolling Records 023 (2001)
- The Mess of Weird Paul – Rocks & Rolling Records 026 (2002)
- I Punch You! – Rocks & Rolling Records 029 (2004)
- Weird Paul: A Lo Fidelity Documentary Soundtrack – Rocks & Rolling Records 031 (2006)
- Medically Necessary – Rocks & Rolling Records 032 (2006)
- As Heard in My Dreams – Rocks & Rolling Records 033 (2009)
- Police Baffled; Public Aroused (with Ben Blanchard) - Rocks & Rolling Records 035 (2010)
- Simulating the Act of Love (with The Weird Paul Rock Band) - Rocks & Rolling Records 036 (2010)
- Check Me Out Now - Rocks & Rolling Records 037 (2011)
- 25 Lo-Fi Years - Thick Syrup Records 0047 (2012)
- Still Going Strong - Thick Syrup Records (2013)
- Live On WRCT 1988–2009 - Rocks & Rolling Records 038 (2013)
- 57 Big End Halos (with Scott Fry) - Rocks & Rolling Records 039 (2014)
- PP_{2}BB (with Ben Blanchard) - Rocks & Rolling Records 040 (2015)
- In Case Of Fire Throw This In 25th Anniversary - Rocks & Rolling Records 041 (2017)
- The T-15 Tapes - Rocks & Rolling Records 042 (2018)
- Lit AF - Rocks & Rolling Records 043 (2019)
- 31st Anniversary Of The Rocks & Rolling Records 5th Anniversary Special - Rocks & Rolling Records 044 (2020)
