= Asia and Pacific Museum =

Art museum in Warsaw, Poland

Coordinates: 52°13′59″N 21°02′14″E

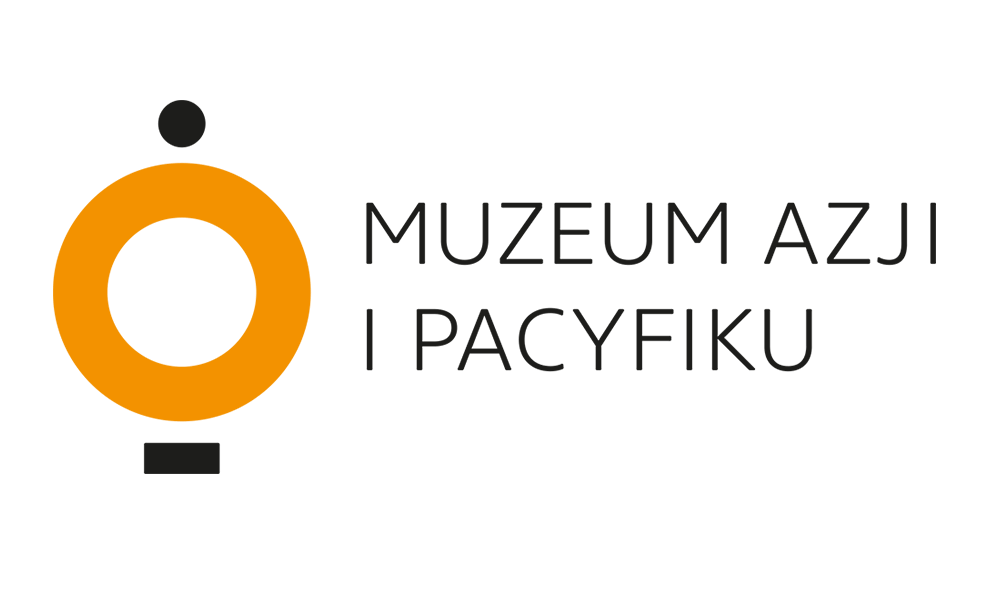

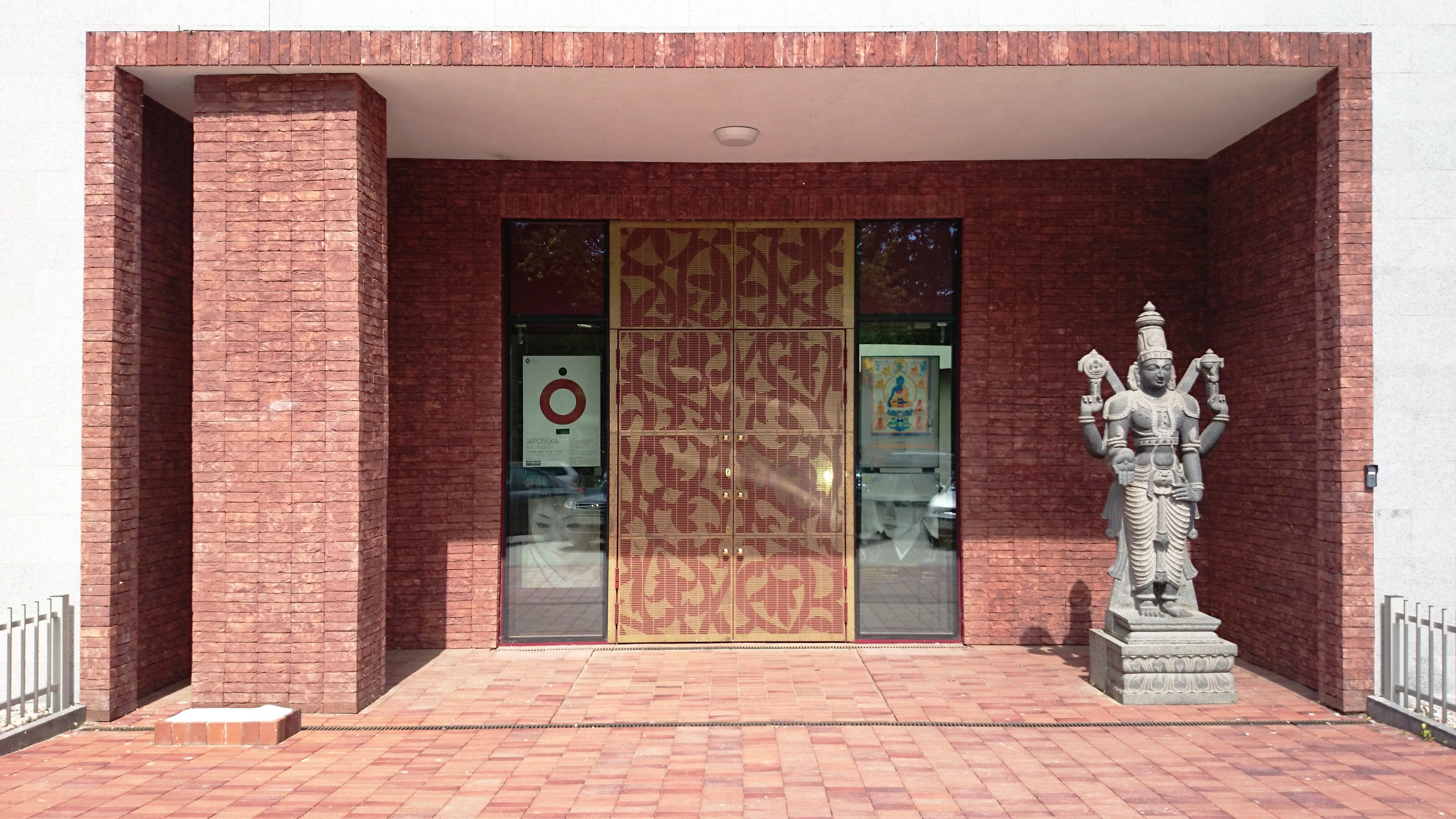
- Main entrance
- Established: 26 February 1973; 53 years ago
- Location: ul. Solec 24, Warsaw, Poland
- Collections: Asian art
- Director: Joanna Wasilewska
- Website: www.muzeumazji.pl

The Asia and Pacific Museum (Polish: Muzeum Azji i Pacyfiku), in Warsaw, Poland, was founded in 1973 from a private collection of Oriental art amassed by Andrzej Wawrzyniak, sailor, diplomat, and connoisseur–collector of Oriental art. After returning to Poland, he donated his collection, numbering over 3,000 objects, to Poland. Thus the Museum of the Nusantara Archipelago was created in Warsaw in 1973.

In 1973 the Museum, continually enhanced with objects from additional regions of the world, became the Asia and Pacific Museum, with Wawrzyniak as its lifetime director and chief curator. The Museum's holdings include over 20,000 objects from Asia, Australia, and Oceania.

== Gallery ==
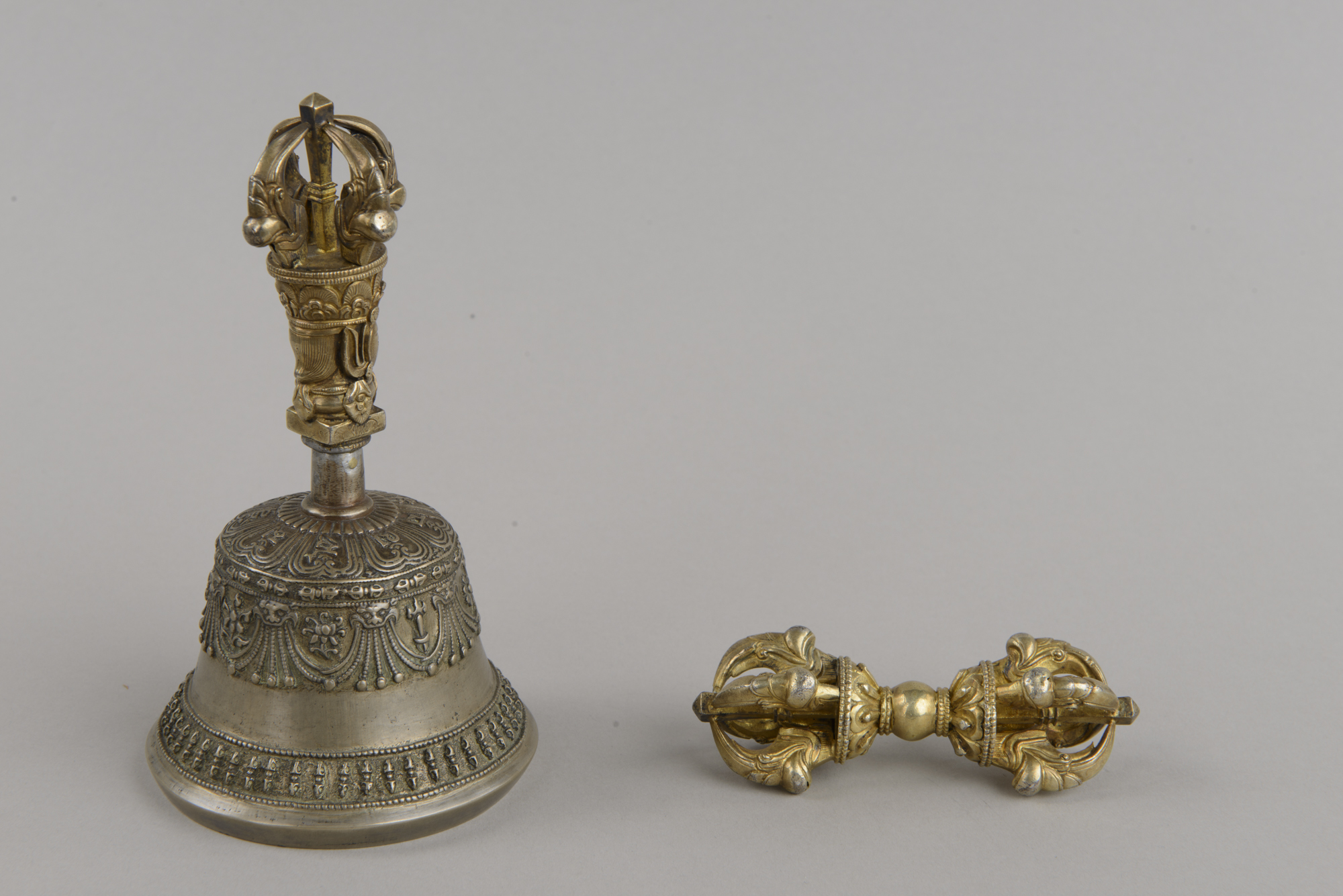
Bell and scepter of power Wadżra (China)

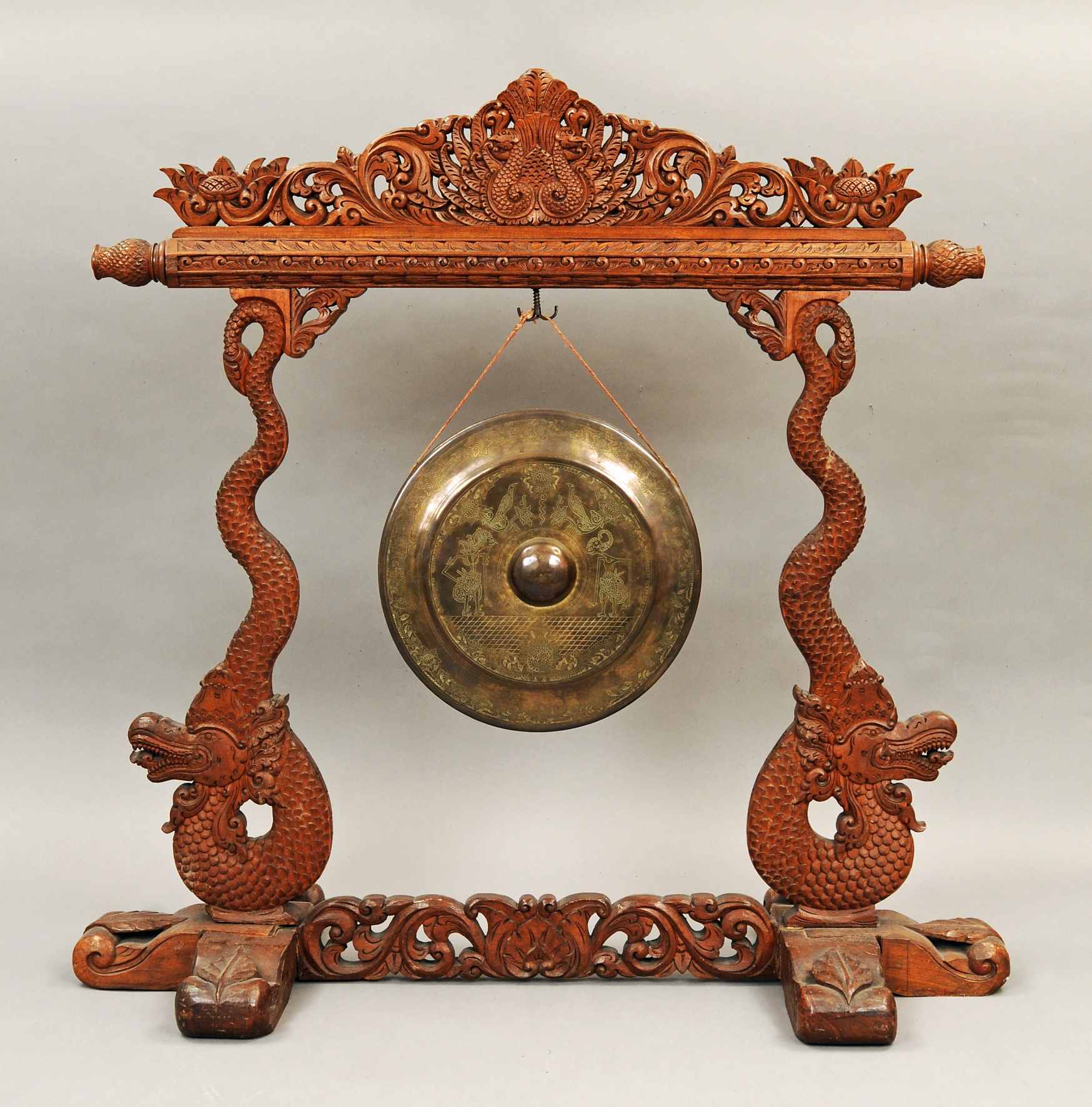
Gong (Central Java) - Asia and Pacific Museum

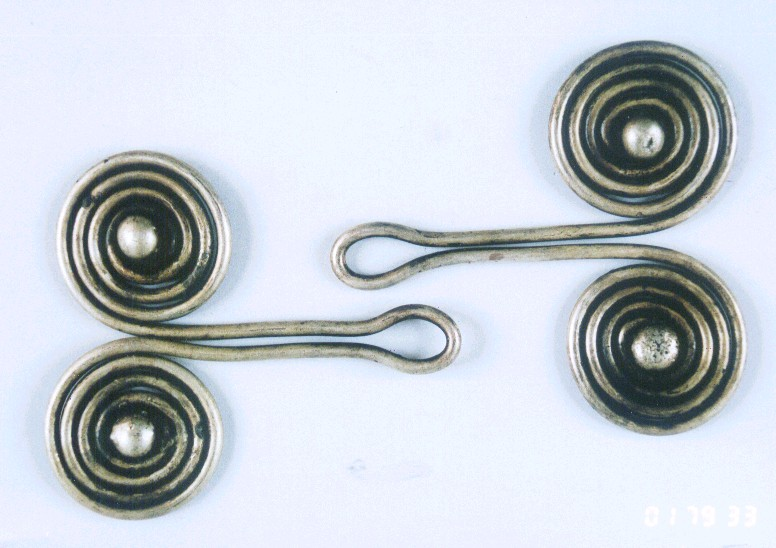
Padang earrings (Sumatra)

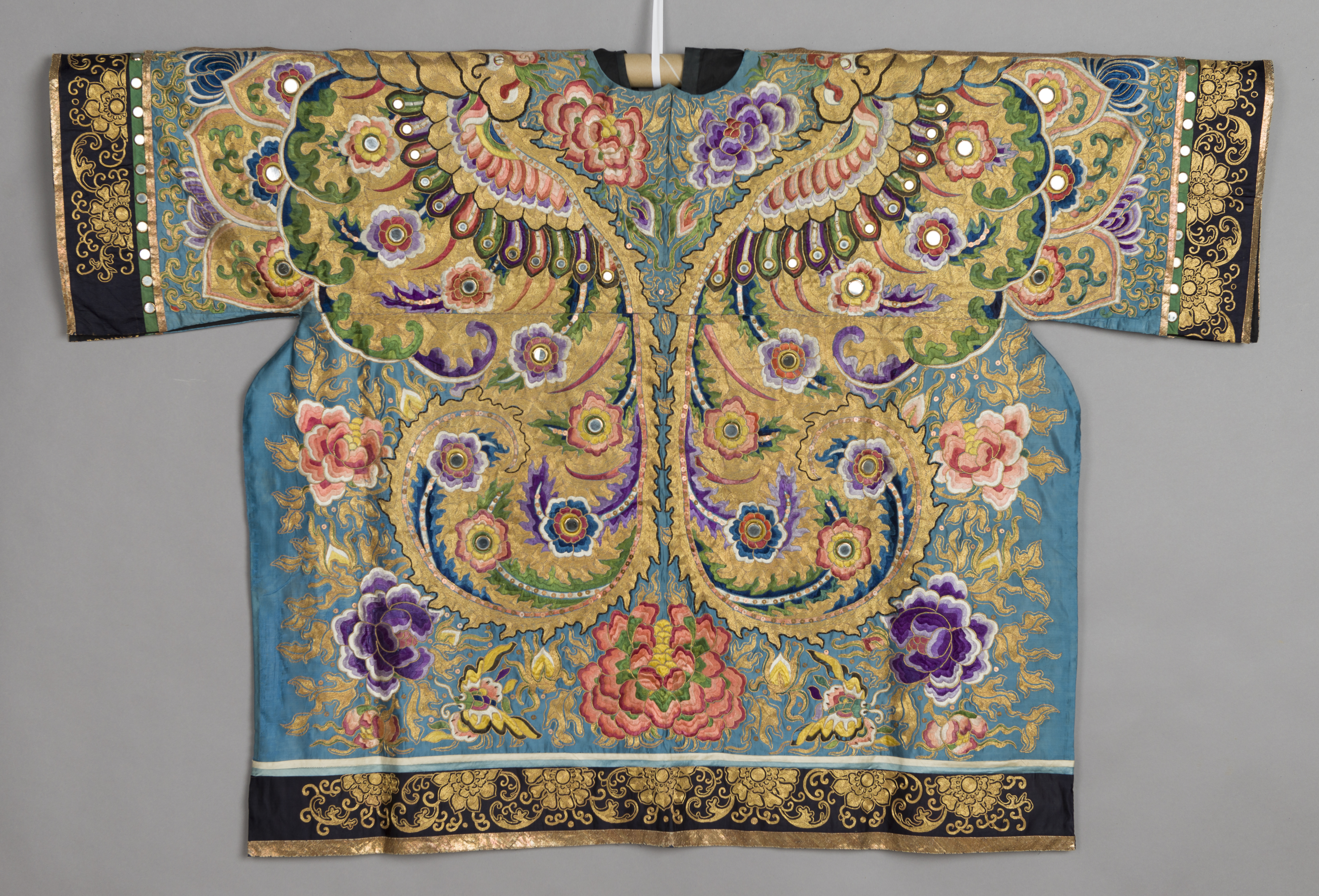
Theatrical costume (China)

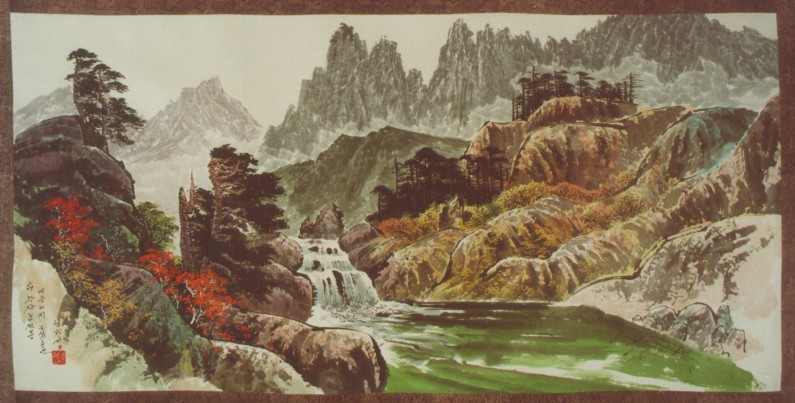
Mountain landscape - Chang Sob (Korea)

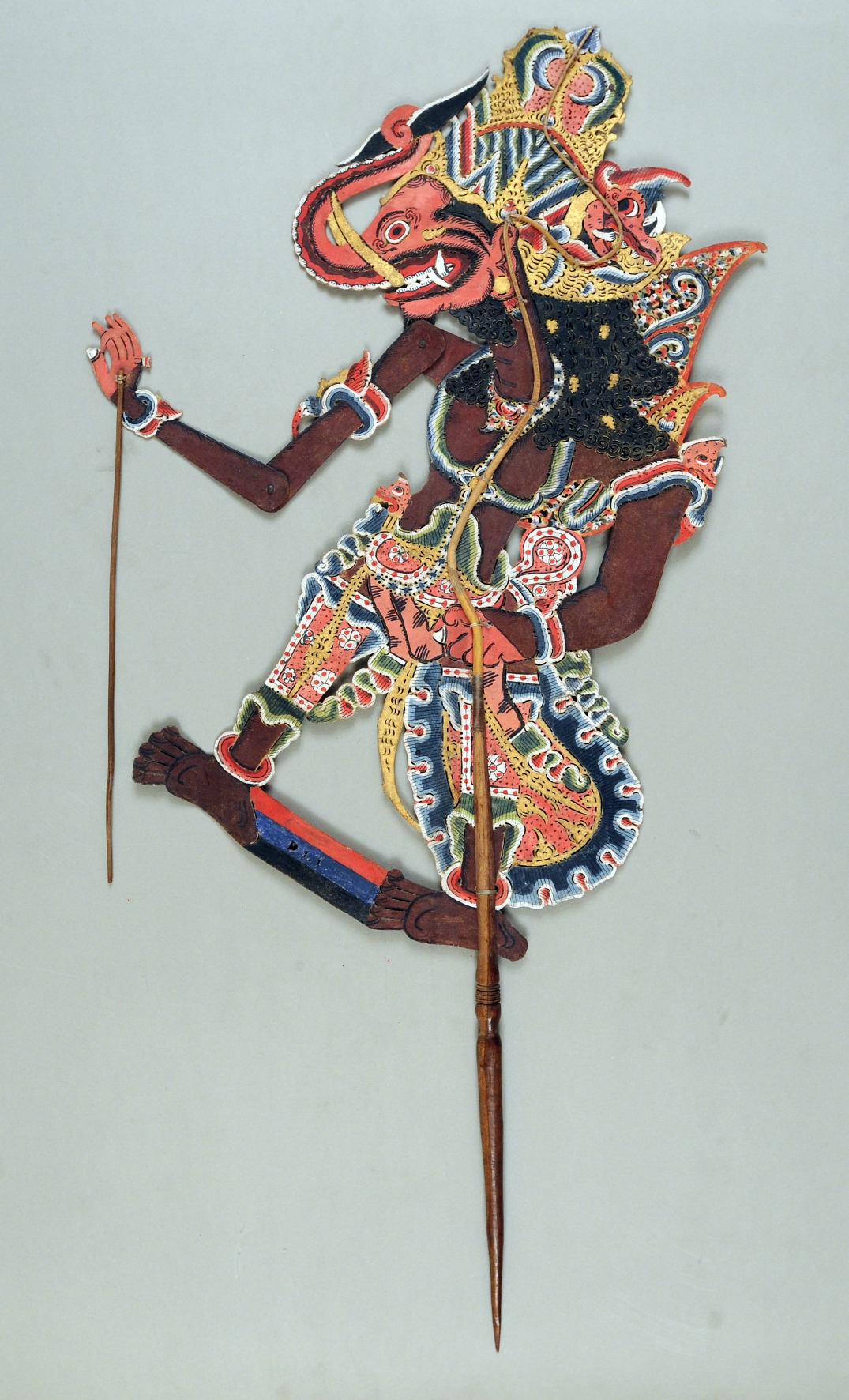
The Shade Theater Doll Wayang Kulit - Ganesha

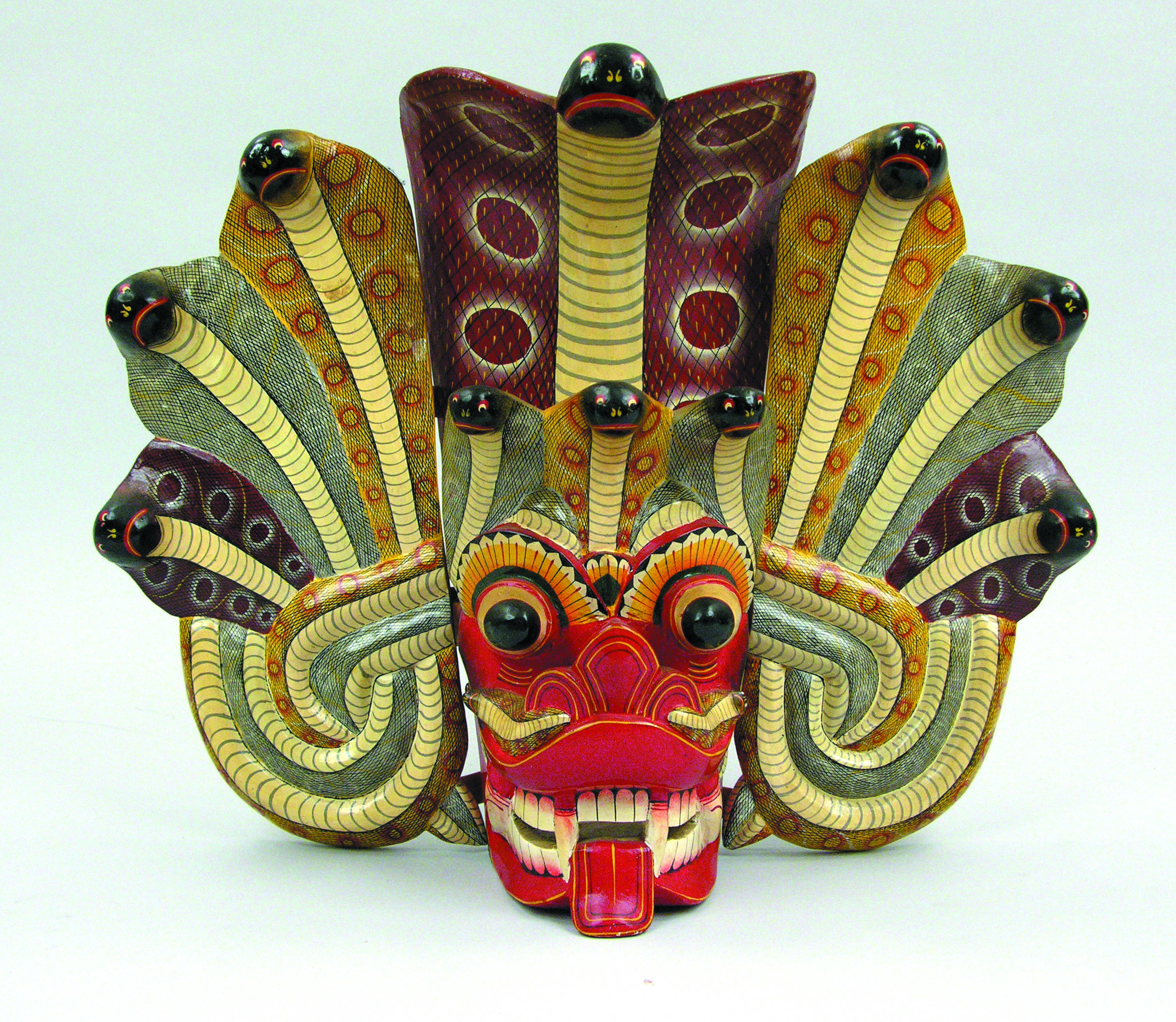
Dance Mask (Sri Lanka)

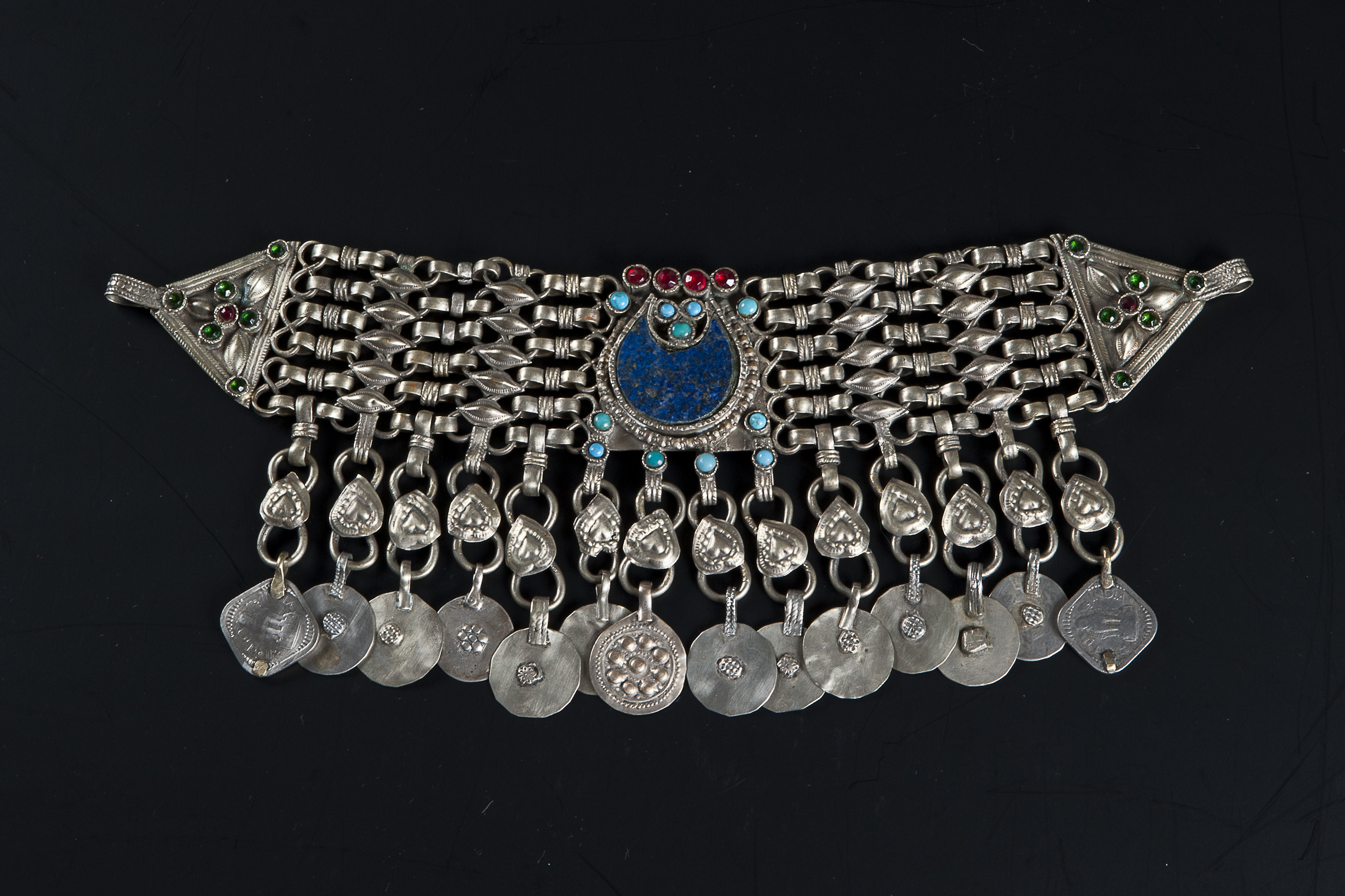
Necklace (Afghanistan)

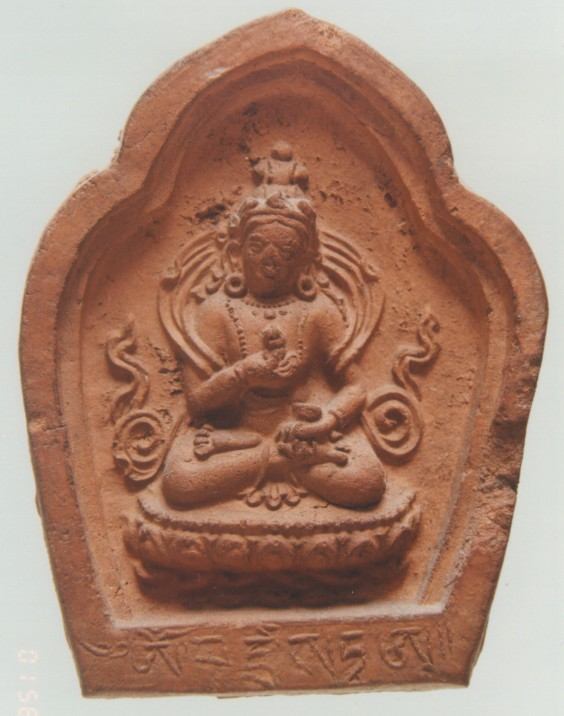
Relief Tsa-Tsa - Budda (Mongolia)

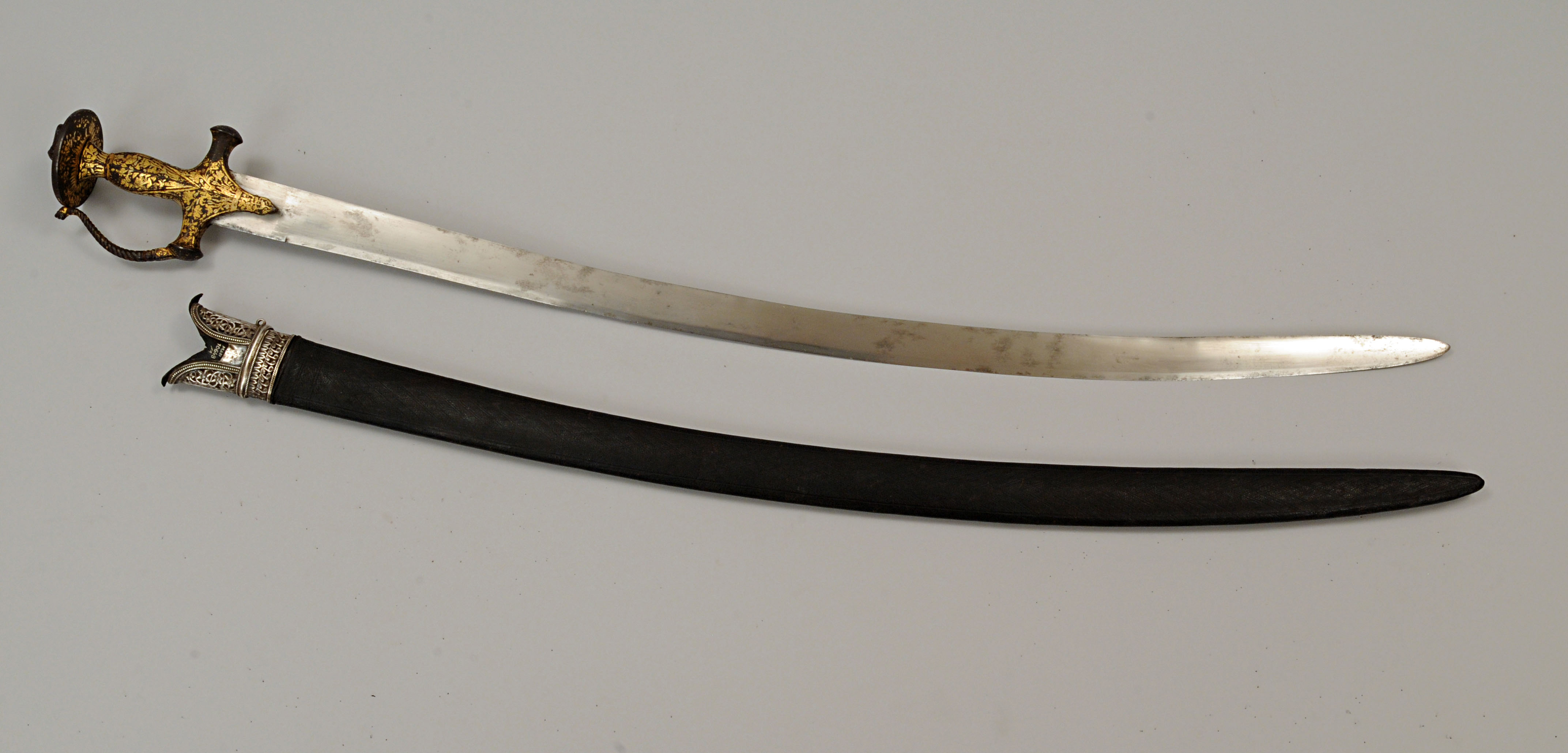
Saber Tarwar (India)

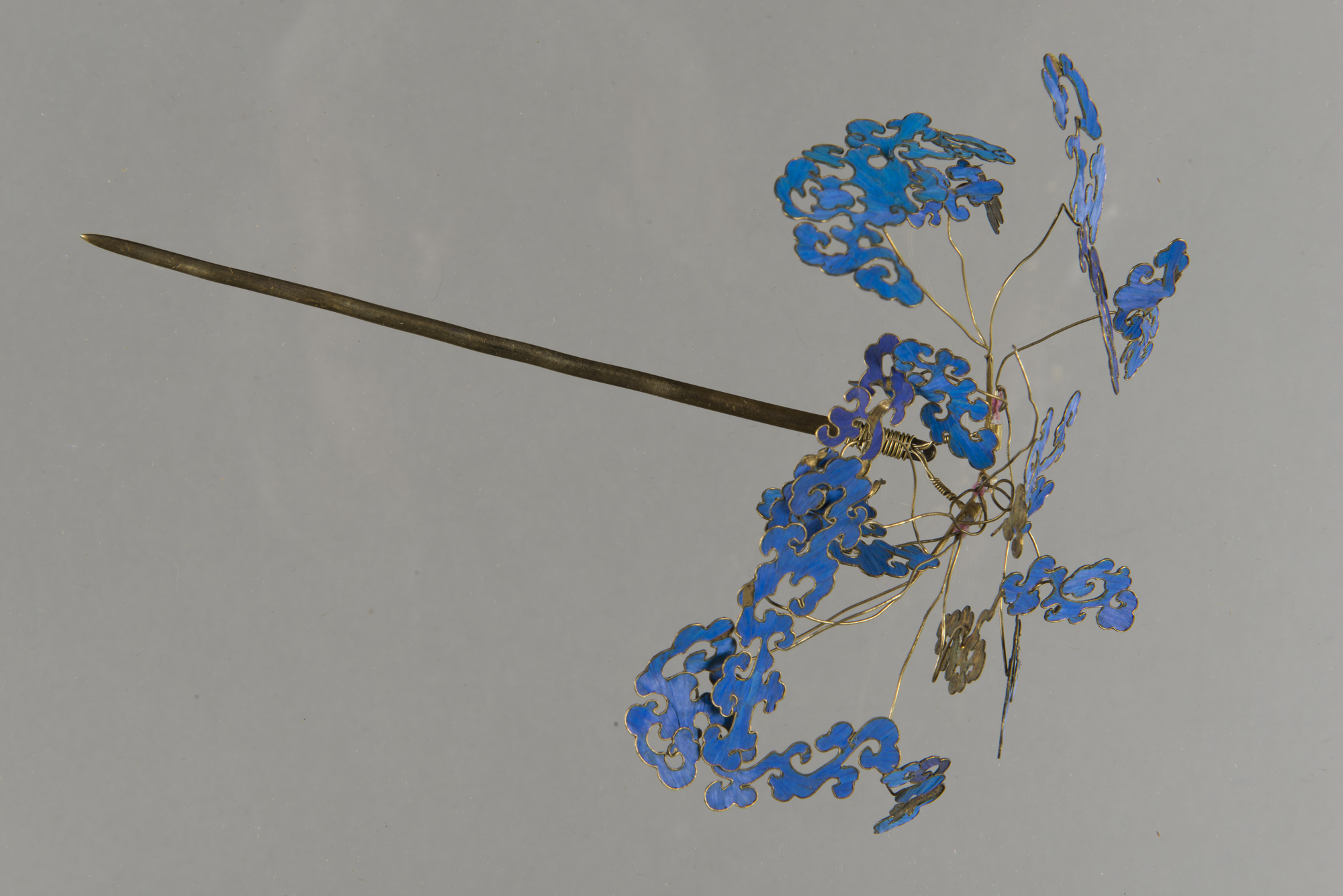
Hair pin (China)

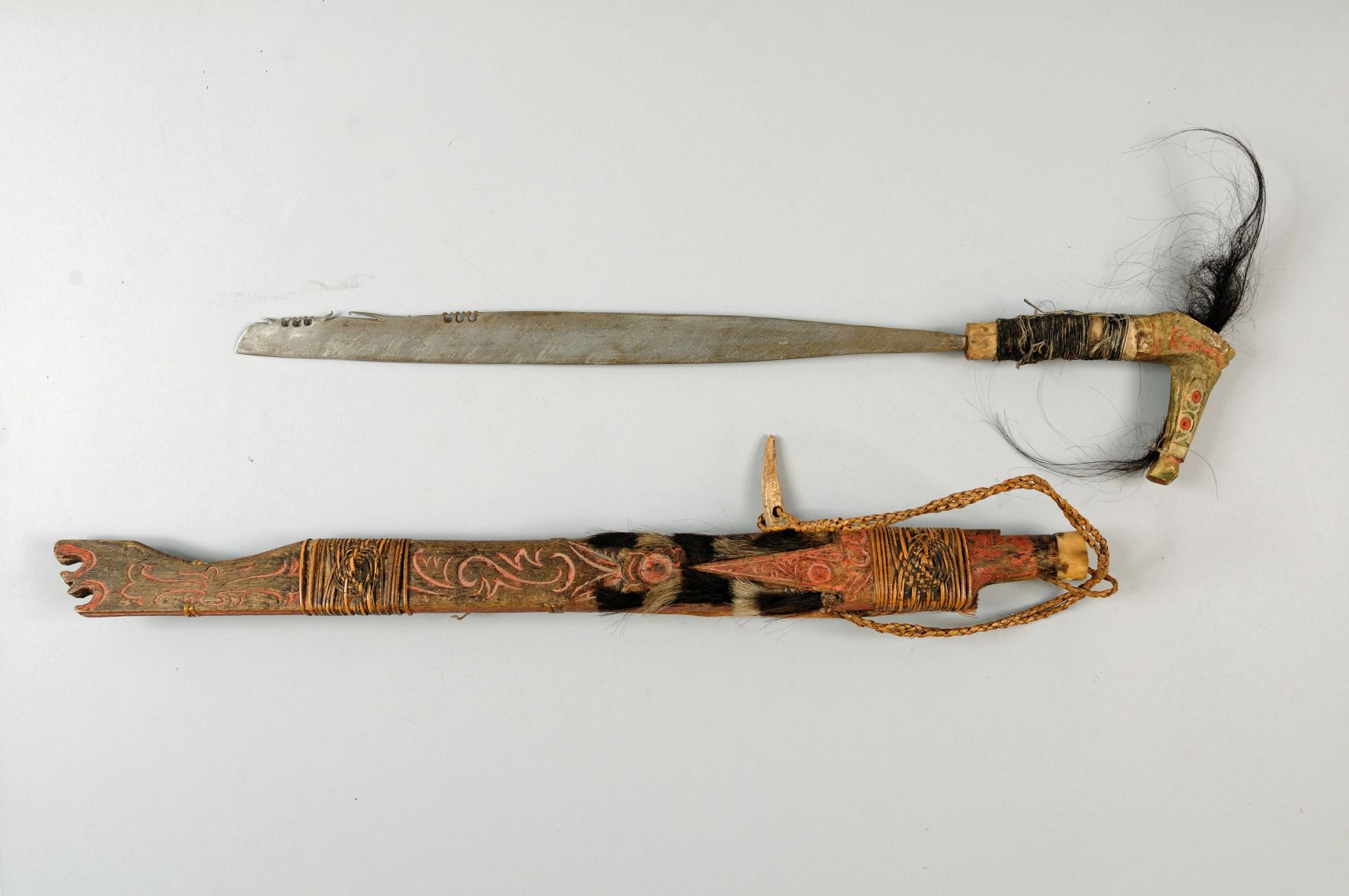
Chopper Parang (Indonesia)

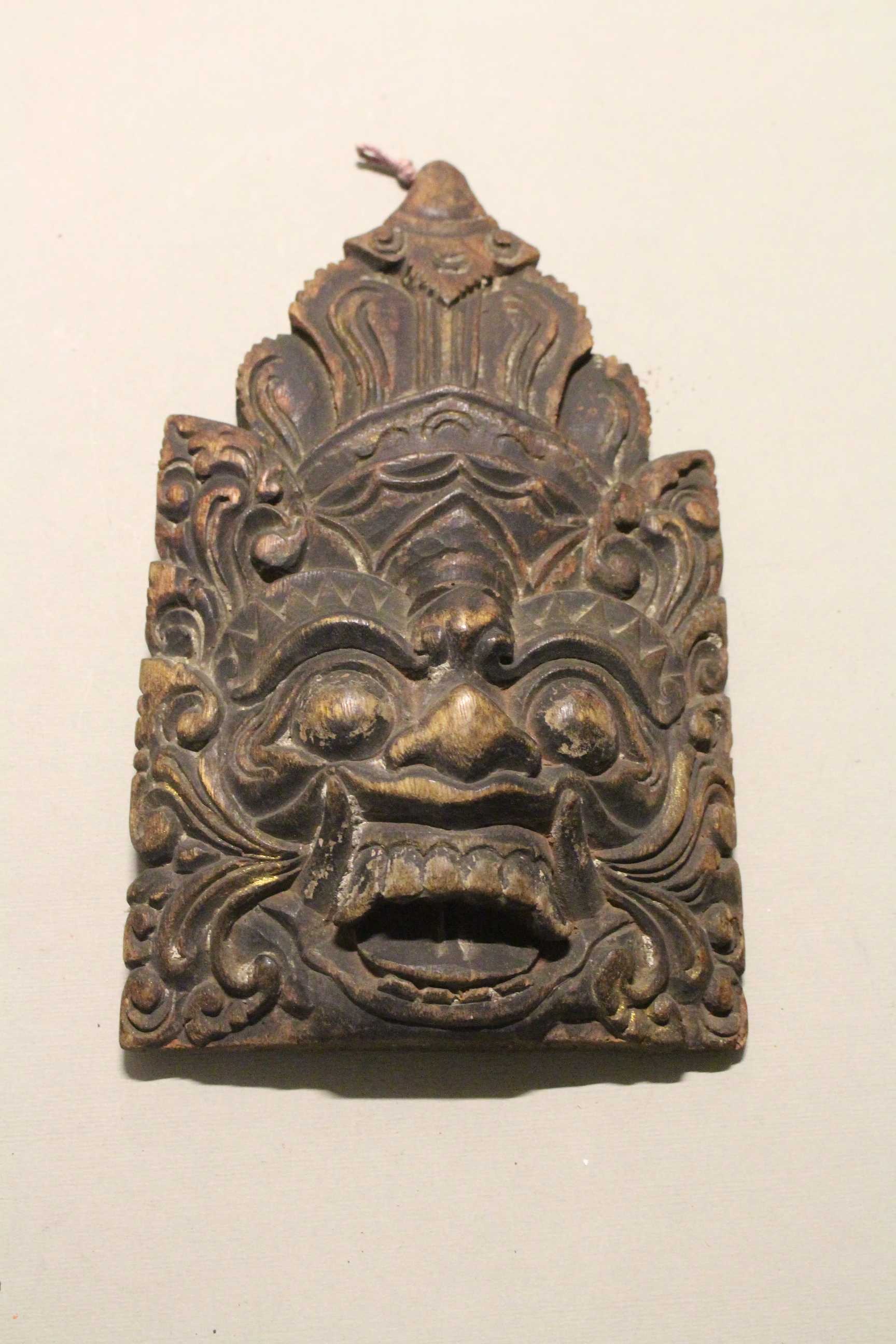
Demon's Face Mask (Indonesia)

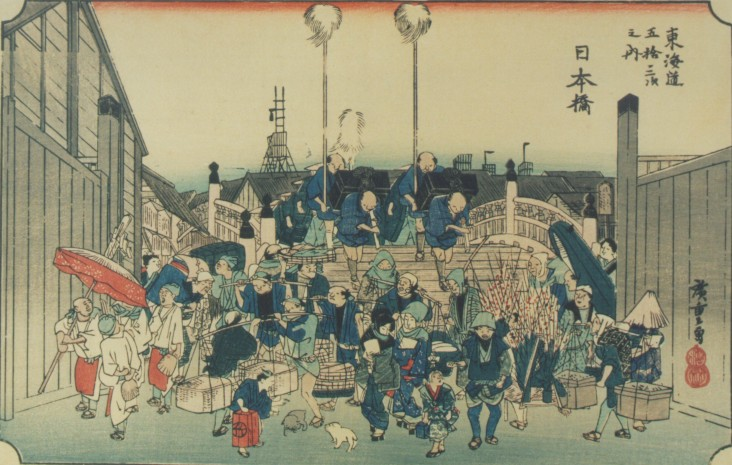
View from the bridge in Tokyo from the series of 53 Tokaido stations (Japan)
