= Harshing My Mellow =

Studio album by Bewitched
- Released: 1991
- Recorded: Quantum Sound, Jersey City, NJ
- Genre: Noise rock
- Length: 31:26
- Label: No.6
- Producer: Steve Albini

Bewitched chronology
Brain Eraser (1990)	Harshing My Mellow (1991)	The Worst Poetry of 1986-1993 (2006)

Professional ratings
Review scores
Source	Rating
Allmusic	2.5/5 stars

Harshing My Mellow is the second studio album by Bewitched, released in 1991 by No.6 Records.

== Track listing ==
All tracks are written by Bewitched.

No.	Title	Length
1.	"No. 1"	3:25
2.	"409"	2:53
3.	"Broken Forest"	4:42
4.	"Orange Owsley"	2:58
5.	"Stereo Nag"	1:50
6.	"Mr. Harvey Crow"	3:38
7.	"Rocket City"	2:40
8.	"Beaver Town"	3:33
9.	"Choad"	2:57
10.	"Pineapples"	2:44

== Personnel ==
Adapted from the Harshing My Mellow liner notes.

Bewitched

- Bob Bert – vocals, drums
- DJ David Cream of Wheat P – turntables
- Art Reinitz – electric guitar
- Chris Ward – bass guitar

Production and additional personnel

- Steve Albini – production, engineering
- Art Bykaz – design
- Daisy von Firth – backing vocals
- Richard Kern – cover art

== Release history ==
Region	Date	Label	Format	Catalog
United States	1991	No.6	CD	kar 021
