= Thick Syrup Records =

- Founded: 2006
- Founder: Travis McElroy
- Distributor: Blue Collar Distro
- Genre: Indie rock, experimental rock, avant garde
- Country of origin: U.S.
- Location: Little Rock, Arkansas
- Official website: thicksyruprecords.com

Thick Syrup Records is an independent record label from Little Rock, Arkansas. Founded by Travis McElroy in 2006, it specializes in indie rock and underground music. It has released the work of known acts such as Matt Cameron, Jad Fair from Half Japanese, Bob Bert of Sonic Youth, Penn Jillette, Don Fleming and Velvet Monkeys. The label also releases compilation albums with multiple artists.

== History ==
Thick Syrup Records (TSR) was founded by Travis McElroy in 2005, but the first year was spent on finances and promoting the imprint. The label's first release was 2005’s Gotta Get It Outta Here by Nathan Brown under the moniker Browningham. McElroy's friend Brian Lovell helped with the label early on, and the name was chosen in honor of Lovell swallowing ipecac on a dare from McElroy. Kevin Rogers later began working with the label in Lovell's place.

As of 2013, Thick Syrup has released about 60 albums that include genres as diverse as art punk, low-fi indie rock, experimental exercises, and rock. According to Arkansas Online, "Thick Syrup has helped blaze a proudly twisted musical path all from the humble confines of central Arkansas."

== Artists ==
The following is a partial list of artists, past and present, associated with the label:

- The Alpha Ray
- Androids of Ex-Lovers
- Avondale Airforce
- Bald Mountain
- Ben Lee
- Bewitched (Bob Bert)
- Blag Dahlia (Dwarves)
- Bloodless Cooties
- BMX Bandits
- Bob Fay (Sebadoh)
- Boister
- The Book of Amy
- Brothers of the Sonic Cloth (TAD)
- Browningham
- Bryan Frazier
- Chicken Snake
- Chrome Cranks
- CooCooRockinTime
- Damien Jurado
- David Fair
- David Greenberger (The Duplex Planet)
- David Markey (film director)
- Don Fleming
- The Empty Boat People
- Everett True (The Legend!)
- Ezra Lbs
- Frown Pow'r
- Ginsu Wives
- Half Japanese
- Herding Kittens
- INT'L Shades
- Jad Fair
- Jam Messengers
- Julie Cafritz (Pussy Galore)
- Ken Stringfellow (Posies, Big Star, R.E.M.)
- Life Size Pizza
- Liquid Skulls
- Lucero
- Lurch and Holler
- Matt Cameron
- Mike Watt (The Stooges, Minutemen)
- Nine Lives Pussy
- Penn Jillette
- R. Stevie Moore
- The Reparations
- Rob Kennedy (Workdogs, Jam Messengers)
- The SEE
- Sit: Boy Girl Boy Girl
- Smoke Up Johnny
- Stella Fancy
- Stephen Egerton (The Descendents)
- Steve Turner (Mudhoney)
- Sweet Eagle
- The Tinklers
- To Live and Shave in L.A.
- Twelve Tone Elevator
- Velvet Monkeys
- Venture Lift
- Weird Paul Petroskey
- The Whistling Joy Jumpers (Jad Fair, Thollem McDonas, & Brian Chase of Yeah Yeah Yeahs)
- Yuri Landman Ensemble

== Discography ==
This incomplete list is organized by catalog number, a roughly chronological number system established by the label and assigned to each release.

No.	Artist	Title	Year
TSR	The Tinklers	Seven Ways to Sunday	2010
TSR0023	Velvet Monkeys	Everything Is Right	2011
TSR0024	Don Fleming	Don Fleming 4	2011
TSR	Various (Damien Jurado, Matt Cameron, etc.)	'78 LTD: Compilation CD	2011
TSR	Bob Bert	Bewitched - Bob Bert Presents: The Worst Poetry Of 1986 - 1993	2011
TSR0047	Weird Paul Petroskey	25 Lo-Fi Years	2012
TSR	Yuri Landman Ensemble	That's Right, Go Cats	2012
TSR0059	Weird Paul Petroskey	Still Going Strong	2013

See also: List of available releases on Blue Collar Distro
