= Richard Kern =

American filmmaker

- Born: 1954 (age 71–72); Roanoke Rapids, North Carolina, United States
- Occupations: Filmmaker, writer, photographer
- Years active: 1979–present
- Spouse: Martynka Wawrzyniak (2007–2015)

Richard Kern (born 1954) is an American underground filmmaker, writer and photographer. He first came to prominence as part of the cultural explosion in the East Village of New York City in the 1980s, with erotic and experimental films like The Right Side of My Brain and Fingered, which featured personalities of the time such as Lydia Lunch, David Wojnarowicz, Sonic Youth, Kembra Pfahler, Karen Finley and Henry Rollins. Like many of the musicians around him, Kern had a deep interest in the aesthetics of extreme sex, violence and perversion and was involved in the Cinema of Transgression movement, a term coined by Nick Zedd.

== Career ==
Kern's first dabbling in the arts was a series of self-produced magazines that featured art, poetry, photography and fiction by himself and several friends. These hand-stapled and photocopied zines expressed the bleakness of New York City's East Village in the early 1980s. Kern's first zine was the bi-monthly The Heroin Addict, which was later renamed The Valium Addict. About 12 issues of these two zines were produced, along with the occasional special issue. This phase of Kern's career lasted from late 1979 to around 1983.

In 1985, he directed a video for the Sonic Youth song "Death Valley '69"; this led to more music video work, including videos for King Missile ("Detachable Penis") and Marilyn Manson ("Lunchbox").

Lung Leg starred in several Kern films and was the cover model for Sonic Youth's EVOL (1986) album (the sleeve design shows a still shot from the film Submit to Me). Along with other Cinema of Transgression filmmakers, Kern was a subject of Jack Sargeant's book Deathtripping.

Kern, whose father was a North Carolina newspaper photographer and editor, turned in the 1990s almost exclusively to still photography. Although mainly known in recent years for his photographs of naked women, he frequently shoots celebrity portraits for international publications.

His book Action, edited by Dian Hanson, was released in 2007 by Taschen, featuring more than 200 full-color photographs of young nude women. Accompanying the volume was Extra Action, Kern's DVD of models featured in the book.

Since February 2007, Kern has directed Shot By Kern on VBS.tv, stills of which are published monthly in Vice.

He was interviewed in 2011, as part of the documentary The Advocate for Fagdom by Angélique Bosio about queercore filmmaker Bruce La Bruce,

After meeting young photographer Petra Collins, Kern purportedly became her lover. Collins also serves as Kern's casting agent in Toronto, Ontario, Canada.

Kern is a regular contributor to Vice, Purple, GQ and Playboy.

== Influence ==
The UK band Manhattan Love Suicides took their name from one of Kern's short films.

== Personal life ==
Kern was married to artist Martynka Wawrzyniak from 2007 to 2015.

== Filmography ==
- You Killed Me First (1985)
- Submit to Me (1985)
- The Right Side of My Brain (1985)
- Manhattan Love Suicides (1985):
  - Stray Dogs (1985)
  - Woman at the Wheel (1985)
  - Thrust in Me (1985)
  - I Hate You Now (1985)
- "Death Valley '69" music video (1985)
- King of Sex (1986)
- Goodbye 42nd Street (1986)
- Fingered (1986)
- Submit to Me Now (1987)
- X is Y (1990)
- Pierce (1990)
- Money Love (1990)
- The Evil Cameraman (1990)
- Tumble (1991)
- Nazi (1991)
- Horoscope (1991)
- Sewing Circle (1992)
- The Bitches (1992)
- "Detachable Penis" music video (1992)
- My Nightmare (1993)
- "Lunchbox" music video (1995)
- Extra Action (2007)
- Face to Panty Ratio (2011)

== Books ==
- Richard Kern: New York Girls (1995, Purr Books)
- XXGIRLS (1996, Fiction Inc. Books)
- New York Girls (1997, Taschen)
- Richard Kern (1998, Charta)
- Model Release (2000, Taschen Books)
- XXModels (2001, Ficton Inc Books)
- Kern Noir (2002, Charta)
- Soft (2004, Universe Publishing)
- Digital Kern (2007, Charta)
- Action (2007, Taschen)
- Looker (2008, Abrams Books)
- 10:41 (2011, The Oversea Books)
- Contact High (2013, PictureBox)
- Shot By Kern (2013, Taschen)
- Girlfriend Boyfriend (2014, The Oversea Books)
- Bed Bath and Beyond (2015, Innen Books)
- New York Girls (20th Anniversary Edition) (2016, Taschen)
- Polarized (2017, Victoria Press)
- 1980 (2019, Off One's Rocker Publishing Ltd)
- Who's Your Death Hero?: Supervert + Richard Kern on Death (2020, Supervert 32C Inc.)
- Medicated (2020, Art Paper Editions)
- Extra High (2020, Innen Books)
- Cars (2021, Hassla Books)
- Baron (2022, Baron Books)
- Richard Kern Polaroids (2023, Art Paper Editions)
- Books, Food, Phones (2026, Friend Editions)
