= Andrzej Wawrzyniak =

Polish diplomat and art collector (1931–2020)

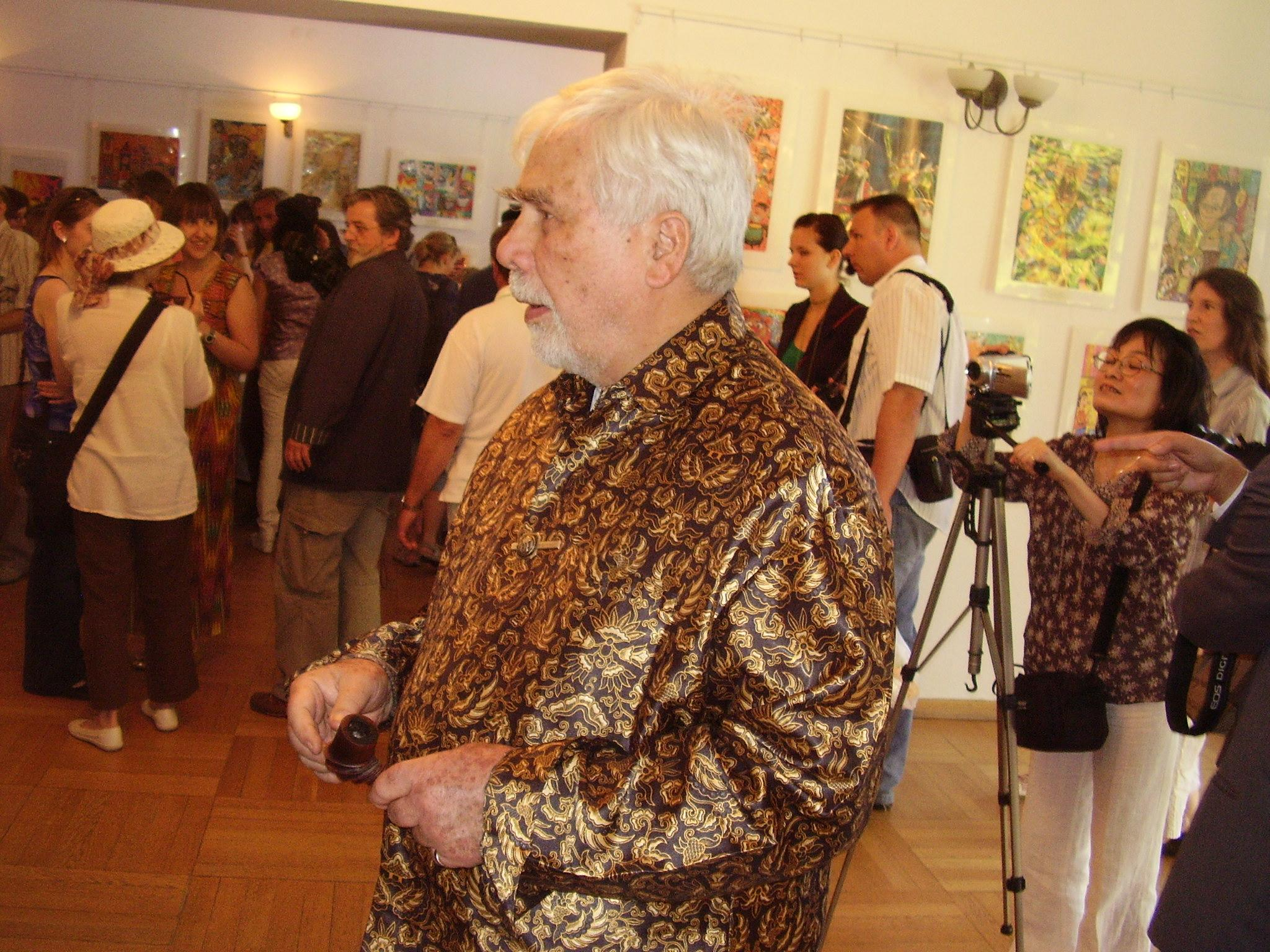
Andrzej Wawrzyniak

Andrzej Michał Wawrzyniak (3 December 1931 – 8 November 2020) was a Polish sailor, diplomat, connoisseur and collector of Oriental art, and founder, lifetime director, and chief curator of the Asia and Pacific Museum in Warsaw.

In Indonesia, a country with which he had very close professional and emotional ties, he was known as “Andrzej 'Nusantara' Wawrzyniak”.

== Life ==
Andrzej Wawrzyniak was born on 3 December 1931 in Warsaw. At the age of sixteen he boarded the full-rigged school ship “Dar Pomorza”, then sailed on twelve ships, moving up from being a deck boy to the rank of officer of the Polish Merchant Marine. In the meantime he graduated from the Diplomatic and Consular Faculty of the Foreign Service School in Warsaw, then studied at the Maritime Faculty of the Economic School in Sopot, and at the Social Sciences School in Warsaw (postgraduate and doctoral studies). In 1956 he joined the Polish diplomatic service, to be promoted in 1973 to the rank of the Minister Plenipotentiary.

- From 1956–1960 Andrzej Wawrzyniak was chief of the department of the Polish Delegation to the International Commission for Supervision and Control in Vietnam.
- From 1961–1965 – he was a cultural attaché to – and from 1967 to 1971 deputy head of mission and chargé d'affaires at the Embassy of Poland in Indonesia.
- From 1973–1974 – he was head of the Polish Delegation to the International Commission for Supervision and Control in Laos.
- From 1977–1981 – he was head of the Polish Embassy in Nepal. He was also the UN international observer of the elections in Namibia (1989).
- From 1990–1993 - he was a head of the Polish Embassy in Afghanistan, later a head of the Field Office of the OSCE Mission to Bosnia and Herzegovina (1996) and UN observer in East Timor (1999).
- Andrzej Wawrzyniak had also been the Honorary Consul General of Sri Lanka in Poland (1997–2003).

Altogether he spent more than a quarter of a century in Asia amassing a significant collection of ethnographical and artistic objects from various countries.

== Indonesian art collection ==
The largest impact on his life was his diplomatic assignment to Indonesia lasting nearly 9 years during the 1960s. After his return to Poland, he donated his collection, numbering over 3,000 objects, to the Polish State. Prof. Stanisław Lorentz described Andrzej Wawrzyniak's Indonesian collection as “one of the largest private Indonesian collections, exceeding even the Dutch collections which are considered to be the biggest in the world”. On that basis the Nusantara Archipelago Museum was founded in Warsaw in 1973.

Because of its development and continuous enrichments with objects from other regions, in 1976 the Nusantara Archipelago Museum had been transformed and began a new span of life as the Asia and Pacific Museum in Warsaw. Andrzej Wawrzyniak was assigned as its director and curator-in-chief for his lifetime. Today the museum holds a collection of over 20,000 objects from Asia, Australia and Oceania.

== Honours and awards ==
Andrzej Wawrzyniak was as an authority in Oriental studies and was a member of numerous Polish and international organizations and associations engaged with problems of the region. Among others, he was a member of the Oriental Studies Committee for the countries of Asia, Africa and Latin America at the Polish Academy of Sciences.

Andrzej Wawrzyniak was honored with many Polish and foreign distinctions:

- Millennium of Poland Decoration in recognition of social activity (1966)
- Golden Merit “For the commitment to the Union of the Social and Civil Workers” (1967)
- Chevalier's Cross of the Order of Polonia Restituta (1967)
- Merit of “The Keeper of National Remembrance” (1971)
- Honorary Merit “For the commitment to the Union of the Social and Civil Workers” (1972)
- Special Prize of the Minister of Culture in recognition of a long-standing collectorship and museum management activity (1975)
- Bronze Medal “For the commitment to the State Defenses” awarded by the Minister of National Defense (1975)
- First Class Medal of Liberation of the Temporary Revolutionary Government of South Vietnam in recognition of his services in the International Commission for Supervision and Control (1976)
- Medal of Friendship of the Democratic Republic of Vietnam in recognition of his commitment to the just case of Vietnam (1976)
- Honorary Merit “Distinguished Official of the Foreign Service” awarded by the Minister of Foreign Affairs (1978)
- Award of the Minister of Foreign Affairs of Bulgaria in recognition of his support for the expedition to the peak of Lhotse in Himalayas (1981)
- Golden Award “Distinguished Physical Culture Campaigner” in recognition of support for the Polish expeditions to the Himalayas (1981)
- Golden Honorary Award “For commitment to Warsaw” (1982)
- People's Republic of Poland 40th anniversary medal awarded by the President of the State Council (1984)
- Officer's Cross of the Order of Polonia Restituta (1985)
- Prize of the Capital Warsaw (1987)
- First Class Medal of the “People’s Tribune” daily in recognition of a long-standing activity aimed at bringing world's cultures together (1989)
- Prize of the Minister of Foreign Affairs of Indonesia in recognition of the commitment to the promotion of Indonesian culture in Poland (1990)
- Order of Merit of the Islamic Republic of Afghanistan in recognition of the commitment to the promotion of cultures of Afghanistan's people (1991)
- Commander's Cross of the Order of Polonia Restituta (1995)
- Order of Friendship of the Socialist Republic of Vietnam in recognition of the commitment to the revolutionary deeds of the Vietnamese People (1995)
- Medal of Friendship of the Lao People's Democratic Republic in recognition of the remarkable commitment to strengthening of the friendship and co-operation between Laos and Poland (1997)
- Medal of Friendship of Mongolia in recognition of the commitment to the development of co-operation between Poland and Mongolia and promotion of Mongolian culture among the Polish society (1997)
- Indonesian Order of Service with Star in recognition of the remarkable commitment and activities aimed at strengthening the friendship between Poland and Indonesia (1998)
- Prize of the Capital Warsaw (2001)
- Commander's Cross of the Order of Polonia Restituta with Star in recognition of the remarkable commitment to the popularization of the cultural heritage of people of Asia and Pacific region (2003)
- Honorary Prize of Jerzy Dunin-Brokowski, Hetman of the Polish collectors (2003)
- Order “Distinguished Cultural Campaigner of Mongolia” in recognition of the commitment to the presentation to the Polish public rich art and culture of Mongolia (2003)

== See also ==
- List of Poles
