= Brain Eraser =

Studio album by Bewitched
- Released: 1990
- Genre: Noise rock
- Length: 38:54
- Label: No.6
- Producer: Bewitched

Bewitched chronology
Brain Eraser (1990)	Harshing My Mellow (1991)

Professional ratings
Review scores
Source	Rating
AllMusic	2.5/5 stars

Brain Eraser is the debut studio album of Bewitched, released in 1990 by No.6 Records.

== Track listing ==
All tracks are written by Bewitched.

No.	Title	Length
1.	"Neon Angel"	2:13
2.	"Sky Skag"	3:57
3.	"Mold"	2:25
4.	"U-Turn"	3:09
5.	"I Dunno What to Do"	5:06
6.	"Crank Call"	3:14
7.	"Chuck's Got a Big One"	5:56
8.	"Skunk Hole Town"	2:33
9.	"Drain"	5:21
10.	"2 Shots"	5:01

== Personnel ==
Adapted from the Brain Eraser liner notes.

Bewitched

- Bob Bert – vocals, drums
- Donna Croughn – violin
- DJ David Cream of Wheat P – turntables
- Jim Fu – electric guitar
- Chris Ward – bass guitar

Additional musicians

- Tad Doyle – spoken word (5)
- Thurston Moore – spoken word (5)

Production and additional personnel

- Bewitched – production
- Art Bykaz – illustrations
- Günter Pauler – mastering
- Jon Soto – photography
- Wharton Tiers – engineering

== Release history ==
Region	Date	Label	Format	Catalog
United States	1990	No.6	CD, CS, LP	kar 007
Germany	1990	Rough Trade	CD, LP	157-1199
