= Martynka Wawrzyniak =

Polish-American mixed-media artist

- Born: 1979 (age 46–47); Poland
- Years active: 1999-present
- Website: www.martynka.com

Martynka Wawrzyniak (born 1979) is a New York City-based, Polish-American mixed-media artist who works in photography, video, performance, sculpture, and installation.

== Early life ==
Born in Poland, she moved to New Zealand at the age of eight and has lived in New York since 1998.

== Works ==
Martynka Wawrzyniak's artistic evolution has drifted from photography and video to performance and installations, often bringing the viewer into a deeply intimate rapport with the artist-cum-subject. She is known for work that engages the senses, often while incorporating experimental techniques.

== Ziemia: Our Stories Are Written in Soil, 2018 ==
Ziemia is a public-art project created in collaboration with residents of Greenpoint, Brooklyn, NY that was completed and installed in June 2018. In the form of a ceramic sphere atop a native meadow in McGolrick Park, the piece bridges divides between the neighborhood's disparate subcultures by serving as a collective portrait of the community through embodying residents' personal homelands and migration stories.

Greenpoint is experiencing a demographic transformation as gentrification pushes out many longtime residents. With the rising displacement and relocation of peoples across the world, Ziemia responds to the need for collective reflection in communities on migration as not merely a global phenomenon, but as a local, micro experience that unites us all.

The ceramic orb is glazed with a mixture of clay excavated in Greenpoint and soils contributed by participating residents from places that are symbolically representative of their identities, including: The United States, Poland, Ukraine, Germany, France, Japan, Serbia, Nepal, the United Kingdom, Ecuador, Mexico, and Namibia. The project includes many Poles who have lived in Greenpoint for generations, and Wawrzyniak personally traveled to Poland to collect soil on behalf of Polish residents who were unable to make the journey. With soil—universally symbolic for one's roots and identity—as the medium, Ziemia gestures to the primal connection to Earth that underlies each individual's migratory experience. As the transitional phase in nature between death and life, soil refers to the cyclical patterns of neighborhood growth and change.

Wawrzyniak chose the materials specifically for their significance in Greenpoint's history. The meadow, composed of native and doppelgänger plant species, references Greenpoint's pastoral past as the once fertile land that sustained Native Americans and settlers.

The international soil was imported with an official USDA soil importing permit and heat treated by a team of chemistry research students at Lehman College. The students have been important partners in the project and are conducting tests on the soils for mineral content as well as traces of pollution.

The public art piece serves as a central location for events to encourage cross-cultural exchange and initiate dialog about immigration and the human relationship with the natural world. Ultimately, the project aims to bring attention to the ties, both sentimental and vital, that we have to the land we call home.

== Feed, 2014 ==
For her Feed exhibition, at envoy enterprises, New York in September 2014 Wawrzyniak committed to a year-long daily exercise which involved the use of one identical 20 x 20 -inch white cloth dinner napkin to wipe her mouth each night at dinner. She then proceeded to file the napkins with a detailed record of the ingredients of what she ate. The project culminated in an exhibition of the 365 soiled napkins sewn together in chronological order in the form of an interlocking, two-spiral 100-foot walk-in structure hanging from the gallery ceiling.

The sculpture was accompanied by a limited edition book in which a photograph of each soiled napkin is accompanied by a detailed list of ingredients. Elaborate three-course meals are boiled down to a scientific index, leaving the taste and visual image of the meal up to the viewer's imagination. The artist simultaneously collected 365 6 x 6 -inch paper lunch napkins, which she used to dab her mouth after her daily morning green juice. These paper napkins are arranged in twelve framed calendar formations, creating a visual record of time passing, much like a prisoner keeping track of time by drawing lines on the cell wall. Both pieces are tactile recordings of a daily performance, and in speaking about the months-long process, Wawrzyniak says: "I felt like I was sharing my meals with the public every day and made a conscious effort to be creative in my choice of ingredients. It was like having a daily dinner party. It becomes a tactile self-portrait, representing a year of my life recorded through the food that nourished me."

Furthermore, also included in the Feed exhibition were two small-scale sculptures: a casting of the negative space of the inside of the artist's mouth out of edible golden candy and the hollow of her abdomen out of confectionery gum paste. Like the stains left over from meals on the napkins these pieces are negative imprints of a living, breathing body.

== Smell Me, 2012 ==
In her Smell Me exhibition at envoy enterprises, New York in fall 2012, Wawrzyniak created an installation reflecting a year-long project where she acted as both investigator and subject exploring and capturing her biological essence. Working with a research team of Hunter College Chemistry students: Paul Kozlowski, Charles Paszkowski, and Paul Tewfik, under the guidance of Professor Donna McGregor, the artist underwent multiple experiments to collect aromatic elements from her body. She was subject to rigorous sessions to extract the concentrated essence of her sweat, tears, and hair to create an olfactory-based self-portrait that would engage visitors in a visceral form of communication without visuality as primary form.

In order to fully immerse the installation space with the scent of her bodily aromas, Wawrzyniak collaborated with the renowned professional perfumer Yann Vasnier of Givaudan and scent director Dawn Goldworm of 12.29 on synthetically reconstituting the organic essences for diffusion. These aromas were released inside a specially designed scent chamber into which visitors entered to partake in a solitary experience. A limited edition of the original organic essences were displayed in tear shaped chemistry vials as well as three candles that were made of paraffin that was scraped off Wawrzyniak's body then melted into 250 ml chemistry beakers.

In an interview with New York Times Magazine, Wawrzyniak explains, "In today's society we do everything we can to mask the natural scent of our bodies, thus forgoing an ancient form of animal communication. I wanted to isolate these primal human essences and deliver them in an environment devoid of other sensual distractions. The piece represents the true essence of a woman - free of visual prejudice."

== Eau De M, 2014 ==
In 2014 she expanded the Smell Me olfactory self-portrait concept by exposing it to the wider public through guerilla advertising. The resultant piece, Eau De M, which consisted of the artist's sweat essence delivered by way of a magazine scent-strip fragrance advertisement, appeared as a double-sided insert in the full print run of the May 2014 issue of Harper's Bazaar. The advertisement became a vehicle for spreading her essence, letting the mass market consume her artwork unwittingly.

== Chocolate, 2011 ==
In 2011, Wawyrzyniak released Chocolate, a 9-and-a-half minute performance video in which the artist's face is slowly submerged in 16 gallons of chocolate syrup.

== 4 Sale, 2010 ==
In November 2010, she contributed to 4 Sale, a collaboration of four female artists exploring conceptions of eroticism using themselves as the subjects. Wawrzyniak's contribution was a photo series of the four artists naked except for a camera, and a video of the four applying lipstick first conventionally to their lips and then in deranged fashion to the rest of their faces. In a review of the show, Artinfo described Wawrzyniak as owing "an allegiance both to the vamping of pinup girls and straightforward commercial portraiture", and praised the project as a "serious, well-crafted, yet approachable work that isn't afraid to handle sexuality with a mix of humor, drama, and the occasional dash of mysticism". W magazine commented that Wawrzyniak "explores femininity with both brutality and warmth".

== Ketchup, 2009 ==
In 2009 Wawrzyniak performed Ketchup, in which she stood blind folded as four 10-year-old boys armed with water guns filled with ketchup fired at her as she stood against a gallery wall. The video was later projected over the ketchup splattered wall with only the artist visible accompanied by audio of the boys voices. It was described by Walter Robinson of Artnet as being "like Lord of the Flies, but without the protective distance of fiction. "

Wawrzyniak's work has been covered in The New York Times, New York, Newsweek, The Huffington Post, NRC Handelsblad, Garage Magazine, Vice, and The Wall Street Journal.

== Exhibitions ==
Wawrzyniak's work has appeared in exhibitions, both collective and solo, since 2003.

=== Solo ===
2018

- Ziemia: Our Stories Are Written in Soil, McGolrick Park, Brooklyn, NY

2014

- Feed, Envoy Enterprises, New York, NY
- Smell Me, Torch Gallery, Amsterdam

2012

- Smell Me, Envoy Enterprises, New York, NY

2009

- Kids, Envoy Enterprises, New York, NY
- Ketchup, Envoy Enterprises, New York, NY

=== Group ===
2015

- Survival 13 Art Review, "Prohibited Acts", Riot Police Barracks, Wroclaw, Poland
- Mouthfeel, Brenda May Gallery, Waterloo, NSW, Australia
- The Great Debate About Art, envoy enterprises, New York, NY

2014

- Biometrics and Portraiture, New Media Gallery, New Westminster, Canada

2013

- DIAcussion, Envoy Enterprises, New York, NY

2012

- Guest artist in Richard Kern - Vintage & Recent Works, Jousse Enterprise Gallery, Paris
- 2012 F.G.Ft, Envoy Enterprises, New York, NY

2011

- Commercial Break, curated by Neville Wakefield presented by The Garage Center for Contemporary Culture, at the 54th Venice Biennale, Italy
- 4 Sale, Galeria Ego, Poznan, Poland
- 4 Sale, 25 Kadr Gallery, Moscow

2010

- Arcadian Night, curated by Kalika Farmer and Andrea Hill, Sheffield, MA
- Voyeur, South Beach Miami
- 4 Sale, Collaboration between Aneta Bartos, Elle Muliarchyk, Yana Toyber and Martynka Wawrzyniak, curated by Anne Huntington, New York
- Secrets, Space 15 Twenty, Los Angeles
- Salad Days, The Journal Gallery, New York
- Single Lady, curated by Jenny Salomon, Kate Gilmore and Candice Madey, New York
- PYT (Pretty Young Thing), curated by Anne Huntington and Diana Campbell, New York
- 4x4: Four Figurative Photographers, Paul Kopeikin Gallery, Los Angeles

2008

- All in the Family, Screening curated by Laura Parnes, Sarah Meltzer Gallery, New York

2006

- PDN'S 30, Photo Plus Expo, New York
- A Portrait of Fashion, Pochron Studios, New York
- Tim Barber: Tiny Vices, Spencer Brownstone Gallery, New York

2005

- Dt (Double Take) Show, ANP, The Netherlands.

2003

- Beyond Compare — Women Photographers on Beauty, Dove / Ogilvy and Mather, Internationally Traveling Exhibition.
