= Sonic Death =

Live album by Sonic Youth
- Released: 1984
- Recorded: 1981–1983
- Length: 68:02
- Label: Ecstatic Peace!
- Producer: Sonic Youth

Sonic Youth chronology
Kill Yr Idols (1983)	Sonic Death (1984)	Bad Moon Rising (1985)

Sonic Death is a live album by American rock band Sonic Youth. It was released in 1984 on cassette tape by the Ecstatic Peace! record label.

== Content ==
Sonic Death contains live recordings from 1981 to 1983. Many of the tracks on the album appear only as fragments, often with no breaks between them. Most of the songs are live versions of tunes from Sonic Youth's first three releases, Sonic Youth, Confusion Is Sex and the Kill Yr Idols EP.

Because Sonic Youth used many different alternative tunings, but could not afford to travel with separate instruments for each tuning in the band's early years, members of the band can be heard changing tunings between songs.

== Release ==
The album was originally released as a cassette tape on Thurston Moore's Ecstatic Peace! label. It was later re-released on cassette and released on CD by Blast First and SST Records. It is currently out of print.

== Critical reception ==
Professional ratings
Review scores
Source	Rating
AllMusic	2/5 stars

Stephen Thomas Erlewine of AllMusic wrote: "Sonic Death: Early Sonic 1981-1983 captures the early incarnation of Sonic Youth at their noisiest and artiest", but calling it "often [...] unfocused and tiresome." Trouser Press called it "a compilation of poorly-recorded live performances."

== Track listing ==
The album's cover has no track listing, and CD versions consist of only one track, or two tracks (depending on the release), matching the two sides of the original cassette. The following is a list of songs that can be recognized clearly.

Side A

1. "The Good and the Bad" (fragment)
2. "She Is Not Alone" (fragment)
3. "The Good and the Bad" (fragment)
4. "The World Looks Red"
5. "Confusion Is Next"
6. "Inhuman" (fragment)
7. "Shaking Hell" (fragment)
8. "Burning Spear"

Side B

1. "Brother James" (fragment)
2. "Early American"
3. "Burning Spear" (fragment)
4. "Kill Yr Idols"
5. "Confusion Is Next" (fragment)
6. "Kill Yr Idols" (fragment)
7. "The World Looks Red" (fragment)
8. "Shaking Hell" (fragment)
9. "(She's in A) Bad Mood" (fragment)
