= Kill Yr Idols =

EP by Sonic Youth
- Released: October 1983
- Recorded: October 1983
- Venues: Plugg Club, New York City ("Shaking Hell (Live)")
- Studios: Wharton's, New York City
- Genres: No wave; post-punk
- Length: 20:58
- Label: Zensor
- Producers: Sonic Youth; Wharton Tiers

Sonic Youth chronology
Confusion Is Sex (1983)	Kill Yr Idols (1983)	Sonic Death (1984)

Kill Yr Idols is an EP by American alternative rock band Sonic Youth. It was released in October 1983, originally only in Germany, by record label Zensor.

== Release ==
Kill Yr Idols was released in October 1983, originally only in Germany.

"Shaking Hell" was recorded live at the Plugg Club in New York City, October 15, 1983.

In 1995, the tracks on Kill Yr Idols not found on 1983's Confusion Is Sex were appended to the DGC reissue of that album.

== Reception ==
Professional ratings
Review scores
Source	Rating
AllMusic	3/5 stars
Robert Christgau	B−
The Rolling Stone Album Guide	2/5 stars

Jason Birchmeier of AllMusic commented, "These songs resemble the ones on Confusion Is Sex, except that they're a bit more developed, especially the title track and 'Brother James'. [Kill Yr Idols] results in a fascinating wade through Sonic Youth's early flashes of genius."

== Track listing ==
Side A
No.	Title	Lyrics/vocals	Length
1.	"Protect Me You"	Gordon	5:28
2.	"Shaking Hell"	Gordon	4:06
3.	"Shaking Hell (Live)"	Gordon	3:15

Side B
No.	Title		Length
1.	"Kill Yr. Idols"	Moore	2:51
2.	"Brother James"	Gordon	3:17
3.	"Early American"	Gordon	6:06

== Personnel ==
Sonic Youth

- Kim Gordon – vocals (tracks 1–3, 5, 6), guitar (2, 3), bass (4–6)
- Thurston Moore – vocals (4), guitar (1, 4–6), bass (2, 3)
- Lee Ranaldo – bass (1), guitar (2–6)
- Jim Sclavunos – drums (1)
- Bob Bert – drums (2–6)

Production

- Wharton Tiers – producer, engineer
