= Live at Biko =

2014 live album by Mark Kozelek

Live album by Mark Kozelek
- Released: July 1, 2014
- Recorded: April 4, 2014 at Circolo Degli Artisti in Rome, Italy; April 6, 2014 at Biko in Milan, Italy
- Genre: Folk rock
- Label: Caldo Verde
- Producer: Mark Kozelek

Mark Kozelek chronology
Live at Victoria Teatern and Stenhammarsalen (2014)	Live at Biko (2014)	The Kids - Live in London (2014)

Live at Biko is a live album by American singer-songwriter Mark Kozelek. It was released on July 1, 2014, through Kozelek's own record label Caldo Verde Records.

The album was recorded on April 6, 2014 in Biko Club in Milan, Italy. It features live renditions of Sun Kil Moon tracks, as well as selections from Kozelek's respective 2013 collaborative albums with Jimmy LaValle and Desertshore, Perils from the Sea (2013) and Mark Kozelek & Desertshore (2013). The tracks "I Love My Dad" and "Tavoris Cloud" were recorded on April 4, 2014 at Circolo Degli Artisti in Rome, Italy.

== Critical reception ==
Professional ratings
Aggregate scores
Source	Rating
Metacritic	80/100
Review scores
Source	Rating
Consequence of Sound	B−
Paste	8.2/10
Pitchfork	7.8/10
PopMatters	7/10

Upon its release, Live at Biko received positive reviews from music critics. At Metacritic, which assigns a normalized rating out of 100 to reviews from critics, the album received an average score of 80, which indicates "generally favorable reviews", based on 6 reviews. Dan Caffrey of Consequence of Sound wrote: "If you’re a Kozelek disciple, the songs on Live at Biko won’t give you further insight into the love, lust, humor, and sadness that make him tick, but the dialogue sure will." Paste magazine critic Mack Hayden stated that the album is "as communal as a set of campfire songs, complete with humor, screw-ups and familiarity."

Stuart Berman of Pitchfork noted: "Live at Biko is quick to remind us that Benji is as much a comedy as tragedy, at times forcefully so." PopMatters critic John Paul praised Kozelek's lyrics and storytelling, writing: "Thoroughly exhausting, but highly rewarding, Kozelek’s recent work is some of the most rewarding of his career, Live at Biko proving no exception."

== Track listing ==
All tracks are written by Mark Kozelek except where noted.

Track listing
No.	Title	Writer(s)	Album	Length
1.	"Gustavo"	Kozelek, Jimmy LaValle	Perils from the Sea
2.	"I Watched The Film The Song Remains The Same"		Benji
3.	"I Love My Dad"		Benji
4.	"Dogs"		Benji
5.	"Micheline"		Benji
6.	"Richard Ramirez Died Today Of Natural Causes"		Benji
7.	"Ålesund"		Admiral Fell Promises
8.	"Hey You Bastards I'm Still Here"	Kozelek, Chris Connolly, Phil Carney	Mark Kozelek & Desertshore
9.	"Sunshine In Chicago"		Among the Leaves
10.	"Carissa"		Benji
11.	"Caroline"	Kozelek, LaValle	Perils from the Sea
12.	"Tavoris Cloud"	Kozelek, Connolly, Carney	Mark Kozelek & Desertshore
13.	"Ceiling Gazing"	Kozelek, LaValle	Perils from the Sea
14.	"Elaine"		Among the Leaves

== Personnel ==
- Mark Kozelek – performance, production, photography
- Nathan Winter – mixing
- Et Cetera – graphic design
