= Live at Phoenix Public House Melbourne =

Live album by Mark Kozelek
- Released: February 19, 2013
- Recorded: Phoenix Public House, Melbourne; June 11, 2012
- Genre: Indie folk
- Label: Caldo Verde Records

Mark Kozelek chronology
Like Rats (2013)	Live at Phoenix Public House Melbourne (2013)	Perils From The Sea (2013)

Live at Phoenix Public House Melbourne is a live album by American singer-songwriter Mark Kozelek, released on February 19, 2013 on Caldo Verde Records. Recorded on June 11, 2012, and released on the same day as Kozelek's covers album, Like Rats (2013), the album predominantly features tracks from the then-recently released Sun Kil Moon album, Among the Leaves (2012).

The track, "You Missed My Heart", would subsequently appear on Kozelek's collaborative album with The Album Leaf's Jimmy Lavalle, Perils From The Sea (2013).

== Reception ==
=== Critical response ===
Professional ratings
Review scores
Source	Rating
Pitchfork Media	7.4/10

Pitchfork Media's Stephen Deusner gave the album a positive review stating, "Live at Phoenix Public House Melbourne may be [Kozelek]'s most substantial live album in ages. It draws heavily from Among the Leaves, and makes a worthy addendum to the studio recording because it places these songs in what sounds like their natural setting: a small club sparsely filled with adoring fans clapping politely even after Kozelek laments the lop-sided male:female ratio."

== Track listing ==
No.	Title	Original release	Length
1.	"I Know It's Pathetic But That Was the Greatest Night of My Life" (Live)	Among the Leaves
2.	"Sunshine in Chicago" (Live)	Among the Leaves
3.	"The Moderately Talented Young Woman" (Live)	Among the Leaves
4.	"That Bird Has a Broken Wing" (Live)	Among the Leaves
5.	"Glenn Tipton" (Live)	Ghosts of the Great Highway
6.	"Track Number 8"" (Live)	Among the Leaves
7.	"UK Blues" (Live)	Among the Leaves
8.	"Heron Blue" (Live)	April
9.	"Mistress" (Live)	Red House Painters
10.	"Church of the Pines" (Live)	Admiral Fell Promises
11.	"You Missed My Heart" (Live)	Perils from the Sea
12.	"Black Kite" (Live)	Among the Leaves

== Personnel ==
- Mark Kozelek - vocals, guitar, photographs
- Et Cetera - sleeve design
