= Yellow Kitchen =

Studio album by Mark Kozelek & Sean Yeaton
- Released: June 30, 2017
- Recorded: December 2016–May 2017, Pennsylvania and California
- Genre: Experimental; spoken word; ambient
- Length: 41:16
- Label: Caldo Verde
- Producer: Mark Kozelek; Sean Yeaton

Mark Kozelek chronology
| Mark Kozelek Sings Favorites (2016) | Yellow Kitchen (2017) | Mark Kozelek with Ben Boye and Jim White (2017) |

Yellow Kitchen is a collaboration album between American musician and singer Mark Kozelek of Sun Kil Moon and Sean Yeaton, bassist of Parquet Courts, released on June 30, 2017 by Caldo Verde Records, though available for streaming shortly prior to that. Kozelek and Yeaton met at a Dutch festival in summer 2016, and recorded and self-produced Yellow Kitchen from December 2016 to May 2017 in the United States. Guest appearances on the album include Steve Shelley and Jim White on drums and Holly Throsby and Will Oldham (Bonnie "Prince" Billy) on vocals.

The album develops upon Kozelek's spoken word, stream of consciousness lyrical and vocal approach. Autobiographical in nature, Kozelek comments on his personal life and current affairs among other subjects. The music, largely provided by Yeaton, is experimental and ambient, displaying occasional dissonance as well as influences from minimalism. Different musical directions are explored within individual tracks in addition to across the album. Upon its release in 2017, where it became Kozelek's third album and fourth release overall that year, Yellow Kitchen received both positive and mixed views from professional music critics, with some journalists opining that the recording was one of Kozelek's most abstract releases yet.

== Recording ==
While Mark Kozelek won critical acclaim with his band Sun Kil Moon's sixth album Benji (2014), on his subsequent projects, he moved towards a more esoteric and "almost Knausgårdian [lyrical and vocal] style, including long, detailed, half-sung, half-spoken descriptions of everything that he did and thought in a given span." Kozelek met Parquet Courts bassist and electronic musician Sean Yeaton in summer 2016 at a musical festival in the Netherlands, forming a friendship which led to the recording of Yellow Kitchen, which was recorded between December 2016 and May 2017 in Pennsylvania and California. The duo self-produced the album, while Kozelek wrote and sang the lyrics while Yeaton created the music,

The album features guest appearances from Jim White, ex-Sonic Youth drummer Steve Shelley, Holly Throsby and Will Oldham (Bonnie "Prince" Billy). Shelley plays drums on "No Christmas Like This" while White plays drums on "Daffodils", while vocals are contributed by Throsby on "Time to Destination" and Oldham on "The Reasons I Love You". Yellow Kitchen is Kozelek's fourth release of 2017, following Sun Kil Moon's Common as Light and Love Are Red Valleys of Blood, his solo Night Talks EP, and 30 Seconds to the Decline of Planet Earth, a collaboration between Sun Kil Moon and Jesu.

== Music and lyrics ==
"Kozelek does “sing” on a few tracks overtop of some light woodwinds, or quietly mixed guitars and drums, but it’s hardly in a conventionally musical manner. The music is somewhat sparse, but experimental, and often goes in several different directions over the course of a single track."

—Liam Prost, BeatRoute Magazine

Written and spoken by Kozelek and autobiographical in nature, the lyrics and vocal delivery of Yellow Kitchen develop upon the stream of consciousness, spoken word style of Kozelek's work since Sun Kil Moon's Universal Themes (2015). As with Kozelek's other 2016-2017 releases, his words on the album reflect his concerns with his own aging and health, while touching on subjects such as celebrity deaths, restaurants Kozelek had dined at, films he had watched and why Kozelek's writing style had changed since the 1990s.

Musically, Yellow Kitchen is abstract and cold in tone, as well as more experimental than other Kozelek albums, providing what Paul Simpson for AllMusic described as "a dreamlike, sometimes distant background for Kozelek's autobiographical rants." Yeaton's music on the album is ambient and occasionally discordant, evoking what one reviewer described as a sense of paranoia. The style from the album is said to change between "avant-garde keyboard passage and ragged lo-fi indie rock," especially on "No Christmas Like This". The dark atmosphere of the album matches the album's anxious lyrics, while Dylan Montanari of Spectrum Culture felt the album was cinematic and reminiscent of film techniques.

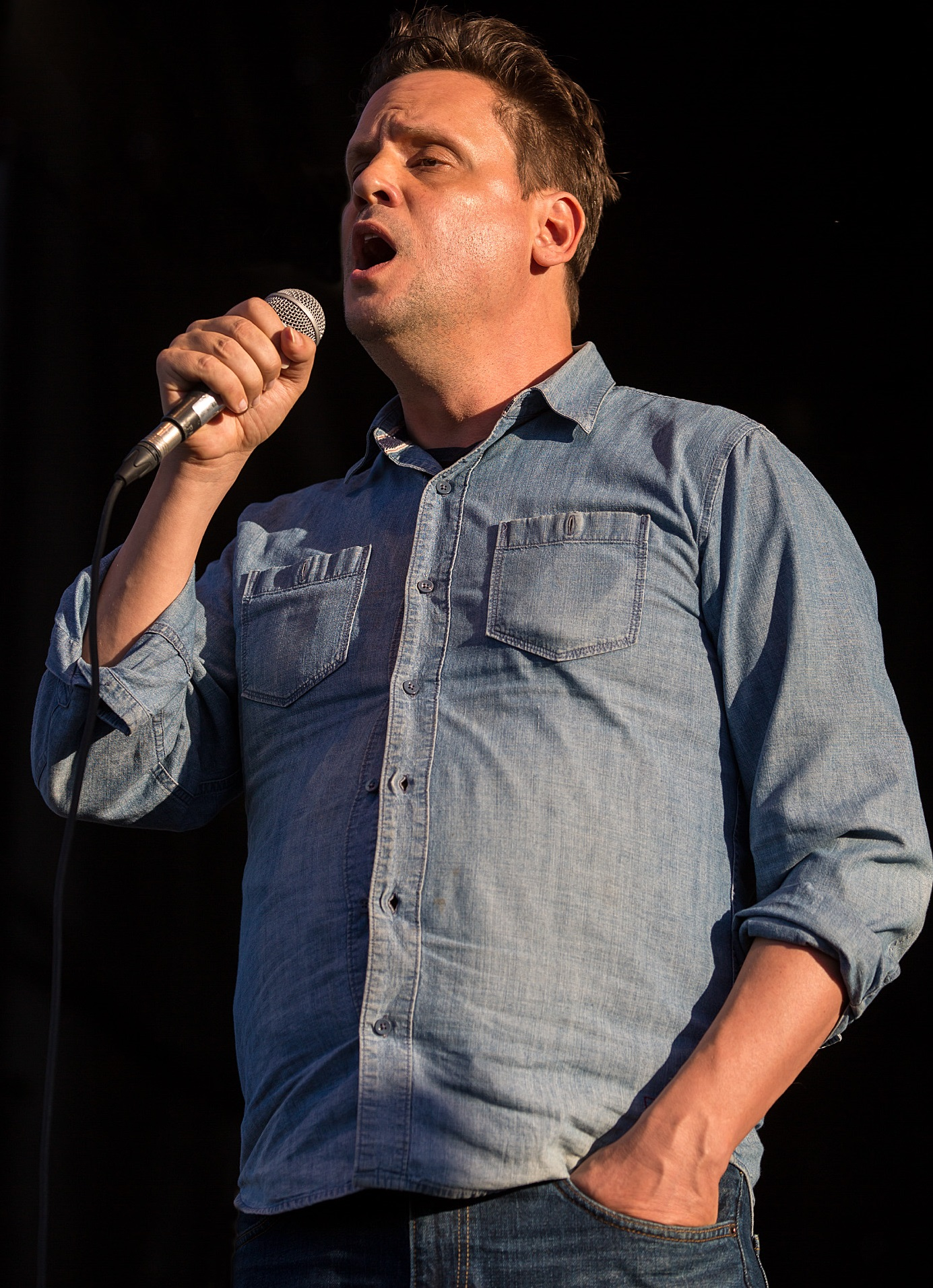
Mark Kozelek (pictured in 2014) developed his spoken word style on Yellow Kitchen.

In the opening song, "Time to Destination", Kozelek speaks harshly of the 2016 United States presidential election and its two leading candidates, Hillary Clinton and Donald Trump, while on a flight to Shanghai in October 2016. In addition to disputing current affairs, Kozelek discusses music venues, his own lyrical style, disc jockeys, the music industry, and fans of Kozelek's early band Red House Painters requesting unreleased, 25-year old music from them. Musically, the track is minimalist, taking inspiration from Philip Glass, and features resounding pianos, metallic clanging, oom-pah-styled tuba, and a "metronomic pulse." "No Christmas Like This" concerns itself with "various inanities."

Kozelek recalls his Mardi Gras experiences on "I'm Still in Love with You". which quotes Steve McQueen's character Henri Charrière in Papillon (1973) and features mouth noises and tuneless yelping from Yeaton and an electronic backing. Soundblab compared it to a 1950s "beatnik coffee house performance art open mic night." The fourth wall is broken on "Somebody's Favourite Song", in which Kozelek discusses the writing of the song itself, unsure of what its subject matter is going to be. Kozelek concedes the song will be precisely four minutes in duration, but after a brief silent interlude, the track begins again, with Kozelek continuing to recall conversations he was in.

Considered by critics to be the most accessible track on the album, "The Reasons I Love You" is a sparse love song Kozelek directs at his girlfriend Caroline, its musical accompaniment including a kettle whistle, click track and acoustic guitar riff. The 12-minute "Daffodils" is an electronica track with a beat that has been compared to Kanye West's Yeezus. It is initially piano-driven as Kozelek recalls an open-mic night, but develops into electronic textures as the recollection become more paranoid. According to Spectrum Culture, "[t]he oneiric quality is broken by the redemptive image of photographed daffodils and an exchange between himself and a departed loved one, possibly [Kozelek's ex-girlfriend] Katy, a lingering muse in Kozelek’s songwriting."

== Release and reception ==
Professional ratings
Review scores
| Source | Rating |
|---|---|
| AllMusic | 3/5 stars |
| BeatRoute Magazine | (favourable) |
| Spectrum Culture | 4/5 stars |

Yellow Kitchen was announced on May 2, 2017, initially with the release date of July 4. As a preview of the album, "The Reasons I Love You" was released onto Caldo Verde Records' website on June 19, 2017, the same day the album artwork and track listing were released and the release date of the album was brought forward. The album cover, a pastel yellow square, was designed by Brian Azer. Towards the end of June 2017, the album became available to stream on Sun Kil Moon's website, and Caldo Verde Records released the album shortly afterwards on June 30. On August 3, a music video for "Daffodils" was released, in which Kozelek holds up numerous objects, including novels, albums, world currencies, a postcard, among many other things.

The album received both positive and mixed reviews from music critics, who found it a continuation of Kozelek's recent musical endeavours. Liam Prost of BeatRoute Magazine called the album "required listening for the Mark Kozelek completionist," while also calling it "mostly just a strange distraction, a fun thing to smile about on the bus on your way to serve our corporate overlords." Dylan Montanari of Spectrum Culture rated the album four stars out of five and said that while "[d]etractors find his musical output increasingly narcissistic, but I don’t buy it. I’m writing this on the 200th birthday of Henry David Thoreau, who once said, 'My life has been the poem I would have writ. But I could not both live and utter it.' Maybe no one can, but Mark Kozelek sure comes close."

Paul Simpson of AllMusic rated the album three stars out of five, while also hailing it as an "Album Pick". With its length of 41 minutes, Simpson found the album "short and succinct" compared to Kozelek's other albums of original material, "which might come as a relief to some listeners," and writes that "even though the music is a bit more experimental, the effect is much the same. It's worth a listen if you enjoyed any of those releases, but otherwise it won't change your mind about Kozelek and the direction his music has taken." Woody Delaney of The Student Playlist wrote that, while starkly different to Benji, "the main thing that the record proves is that he is a songwriter who truly walks to his own beat, and while some may consider it a weaker addition to his vast discography, it’s still a noteworthy deep-cut." Earbuddy were more hostile, saying " these results are so pitiful that you wonder if this is all some mean-spirited joke on the listener."

== Track listing ==
All songs written by Mark Kozelek

1. "Time to Destination" – 6:06
2. "No Christmas Like This" – 7:29
3. "I'm Still in Love with You" – 4:49
4. "Somebody's Favorite Song" – 7:25
5. "The Reasons I Love You" – 3:28
6. "Daffodils" – 11:59

== Personnel ==
- Brian Azer – sleeve design
- Jim White – drums (track 6)
- Steve Shelley – drums (track 2)
- Nathan Winter – mixing, recording
- Sean Yeaton – music, co-production, recording
- Mark Kozelek – photography, co-production, lyrics, vocals
- Adam Cox – recording
- Charlie Beuter – recording
- Will Chason – recording
- Holly Throsby – additional voice (track 1)
- Will Oldham – additional voice (track 5)
