= Benji (album) =

Studio album by Sun Kil Moon
- Released: February 11, 2014
- Recorded: March–August, 2013
- Studio: Hyde Street Studios, San Francisco
- Genre: Folk rock, indie folk
- Length: 61:56
- Language: English
- Label: Caldo Verde
- Producer: Mark Kozelek

Sun Kil Moon chronology
Among the Leaves (2012)	Benji (2014)	Universal Themes (2015)

Mark Kozelek chronology
Mark Kozelek & Desertshore (2013)	Benji (2014)	Mark Kozelek Sings Christmas Carols (2014)

Benji is the sixth studio album by American indie folk act Sun Kil Moon, released on 11 February 2014 on Caldo Verde Records. Self-produced by primary recording artist Mark Kozelek, the album takes its name from the 1974 film Benji, and was recorded between March and August 2013 at Hyde Street Studios in San Francisco.

The album features contributions from Owen Ashworth, Jen Wood, Will Oldham, and Sonic Youth's Steve Shelley.

== Background and composition ==
Following the release of Sun Kil Moon's fifth studio album Among the Leaves in 2012, primary recording artist Mark Kozelek recorded and released three studio albums in 2013; a covers album entitled Like Rats released in February, and two collaborative albums of original material. The first of these, Perils from the Sea was recorded with Jimmy LaValle and released in April, and the second, Mark Kozelek & Desertshore, recorded with the band Desertshore, was released in August.

The first track written for Benji was "Truck Driver", about his uncle who died in an aerosol trash fire. Kozelek had initially brought the song to Desertshore for possible inclusion on Mark Kozelek & Desertshore, but it was rejected by the band. Shortly after this, Kozelek's second cousin died, also in an aerosol trash fire, which inspired the composition of the song "Carissa".

Much of the album's lyrical content focuses upon mortality, with Kozelek stating, "Things get heavier as you get older. At 47, I can't write from the perspective of a 25-year-old anymore. My life has just changed too much and my environment around me." Songs which tackle more historical subject matter include "Pray for Newtown", which alludes to the then-recent Sandy Hook Elementary School shooting and was written after Kozelek received a letter from a fan from Newtown, Connecticut, where the shooting occurred. The song also discusses the 1984 San Ysidro McDonald's massacre, the 2011 Norway attacks, the 2012 Aurora, Colorado shooting and the 2012 Clackamas Town Center shooting. The track "Richard Ramirez Died Today of Natural Causes" refers to the death of infamous serial killer Richard Ramirez in 2013.

The song "I Watched the Film The Song Remains the Same" features lyrics that reflect on some of Kozelek's childhood memories of his grandmother and pays tribute to the influence of Led Zeppelin, whose 1976 concert film The Song Remains the Same Kozelek watched as a child. "I Can't Live Without My Mother's Love" was written following an argument between Kozelek and his mother, and features backing vocals from Will Oldham (as does "Carissa").

Benji's closing track, "Ben's My Friend", was the final track to be written for the album and is partly written about Kozelek's friendship with Death Cab for Cutie and The Postal Service vocalist and guitarist Ben Gibbard. Gibbard previously made a guest vocal appearance on the track "Lost Verses" on Sun Kil Moon's third studio album, April (2008). Kozelek noted, "I just felt like the album needed another track, so I scribbled down some stuff, vented a little about The Postal Service concert or whatever was on my mind that day. I presented it to [drummer] Steve Shelley in two different ways, a slow version and a fast version. He liked the faster one and we went with it."

=== Album title ===
The album's title is taken from Joe Camp's 1974 film of the same name, which Kozelek references in the lyrics to the song "Micheline". Kozelek stated: "I have this light, nice memory of going to see the movie Benji, at a Los Angeles movie theatre when I was a little kid, visiting my grandparents. This record is filled with so much darkness, I wanted to give it a light title, for contrast. Benji is a great movie, one of my favorites."

== Release ==
On January 10, 2014, Pitchfork's Ian Cohen issued the album's closing track, "Ben's My Friend", with the website's "Best New Track" award, writing, "'Ben's My Friend' [is] one of the funniest, warmest, and most revealing songs ever written about male friendship, especially the complications that arise in relationships where one guy's more successful." He also referred to Benji as a whole as the project's "best record to date".

== Reception ==
Professional ratings
Aggregate scores
Source	Rating
AnyDecentMusic?	7.9/10
Metacritic	85/100
Review scores
Source	Rating
AllMusic	3/5 stars
Cuepoint (Expert Witness)	B+
The Independent	5/5 stars
Mojo	4/5 stars
NME	8/10
The Observer	4/5 stars
Pitchfork	9.2/10
Rolling Stone	3.5/5 stars
Spin	8/10
Uncut	9/10

Benji received widespread acclaim from music critics. At Metacritic, which assigns a normalized rating out of 100 to reviews from mainstream critics, the album received an average score of 85 based on 30 reviews, indicating "universal acclaim". In his five-star review for The Independent, Andy Gill found Benji to be "an entertaining, intelligent and profoundly moving album, which elevates the confessional approach to an existentially gripping intensity", and called it "one of the truest, wisest albums you'll ever hear." Kevin EG Perry of NME called the album "as magical as an old dog suddenly performing card tricks." Consequence of Sound reviewer Ryan Bray stated that "Kozelek's transparency never fails to disappoint or miss the mark, and his low delivery and wounded gutter poetry strike an even more personal chord this time around" before noting that "the singer manages to add another solid batch of darkly confessional indie folk tracks to his already hefty CV."

Kitty Empire of The Observer opined that Benji "might well be this difficult artist's most direct work, possibly the most devastating this career melancholic has ever penned" and noted that Kozelek "has nothing left to hide, or lose: the effect is utterly riveting." Ian Cohen, reviewing Benji for Pitchfork, awarded the album a "Best New Music" accolade, described it as "astonishing" before noting that "it's actually Kozelek’s least depressing and most life-affirming record: when faced with an album that exposes so much of the beauty, truth, ugliness, humor, and grace inherent in simply existing in this world, the only response is to go out and live." Juan Edgardo Rodriguez, writing for No Ripcord, felt that Kozelek had produced his "most intimate work yet, thoroughly documenting definitive moments that marked his past and continue to haunt his present" and noted that Kozelek's choice "to approach it with such openness is his greatest gift to us" before giving the album a score of nine out of ten.

PopMatters' Ryan Lathan felt that Benji was "nostalgic and intensely personal", "brilliantly-crafted" and may "possibly be the most beautifully candid record [Kozelek] has recorded under the Sun Kil Moon guise or any nom de plume." Spin's Garrett Kamps described the album as "a gob-smacking collection of bare-bones, gut-punch, all-in songwriting". Writing in Cuepoint, Robert Christgau stated that while he "won't pretend there's any musical reason to listen to this wall-to-wall bummer", he was intrigued by Kozelek's ruminations on family deaths and concluded that "whether you're attracted to his songs or not you feel just how bad this depressive is gonna hurt when his long-separated parents go. That's musical enough for me." Mike Powell of Rolling Stone was less generous, saying that the album "feels less like a collection of songs than a series of eulogies delivered in real time." While noting that "[Kozelek's] hardcore following will no doubt celebrate [Benji] abundantly", AllMusic's Thom Jurek noted that "others may find it a tipping point in the other direction."

=== Accolades ===
Fact magazine rated Benji as the best album of 2014, while Stereogum ranked it as the third best. It also appeared on best of year lists from Pitchfork (number 7), Rough Trade (number 10), Drowned in Sound (number 14) and Tiny Mix Tapes (number 14), while NME ranked it at number 34. Benji placed at number 18 on The Village Voice's year-end Pazz & Jop critics' poll.

Benji was recognized as one of The 100 Best Albums of the Decade So Far, a list published by Pitchfork in August 2014.

== Track listing ==
All tracks are written by Mark Kozelek, except "Jim Wise" music by Owen Ashworth, words by Mark Kozelek.

No.	Title	Length
1.	"Carissa"	6:56
2.	"I Can't Live Without My Mother's Love"	3:59
3.	"Truck Driver"	3:56
4.	"Dogs"	5:37
5.	"Pray for Newtown"	4:08
6.	"Jim Wise"	3:34
7.	"I Love My Dad"	6:16
8.	"I Watched the Film the Song Remains the Same"	10:31
9.	"Richard Ramirez Died Today of Natural Causes"	5:35
10.	"Micheline"	6:07
11.	"Ben's My Friend"	5:17

Limited edition bonus disc
No.	Title	Length
12.	"Micheline" (Live in Aveiro)	7:18
13.	"Richard Ramirez Died Today of Natural Causes" (Live in Goteborg)	4:55
14.	"I Love My Dad" (Live in Copenhagen)	6:05
15.	"I Can't Live Without My Mother's Love" (Live in London)	4:19
16.	"Truck Driver" (Live in Leamington Spa)	4:10

== Personnel ==
Musicians

- Mark Kozelek – vocals, guitars, Portuguese guitar, bass guitar, xylophone
- Steve Shelley – drums, percussion
- Owen Ashworth – Rhodes piano
- Will Oldham – backing vocals (1, 2 and 3)
- Jen Wood – backing vocals (6 and 10)
- Keta Bill – backing vocals (5, 7 and 8)
- Chris Connolly – piano (10), additional Rhodes piano (8)
- Forrest Day – horns (11)
- Nathan Winter – additional drums (7)
- Tim "Tiny" Lindsey – bass (11)

Recording personnel

- Mark Kozelek – production
- Nathan Winter – engineering

Artwork

- Mark Kozelek – photography
- Brian Azer – sleeve design

== Chart positions ==
Chart (2014)	Peak position
Belgian Albums (Ultratop Flanders)	64
Belgian Albums (Ultratop Wallonia)	142
UK Albums (OCC)	69
US Billboard 200	75
US Americana/Folk Albums (Billboard)	5
US Independent Albums (Billboard)	12
US Top Alternative Albums (Billboard)	11
US Top Rock Albums (Billboard)	16
