= The Finally LP =

Compilation album by Mark Kozelek
- Released: December 9, 2008
- Recorded: 2000–2008
- Genre: Folk rock
- Length: 30:24
- Language: English
- Label: Caldo Verde Records
- Producer: Mark Kozelek

Mark Kozelek chronology
7 Songs Belfast (2008)	The Finally LP (2008)	Find Me, Ruben Olivares: Live in Spain (2009)

Professional ratings
Review scores
Source	Rating
Allmusic	3/5 stars
Pitchfork Media	(7.3/10)

The Finally LP is a compilation album by Mark Kozelek. The CD was released on December 9, 2008 via Caldo Verde Records. From the press release:

Over the years, Mark Kozelek of Sun Kil Moon and his earlier band, Red House Painters, has gained well deserved praise for his extraordinary songwriting. At the same time, he has developed a parallel reputation for his unique covers of other people's material. Many of these tracks were recorded for tribute albums that are now unavailable. Caldo Verde Records has now collected them in a cohesive, 10-song CD titled The Finally LP.

The compilation includes a country-tinged version of "Lazy" by Low, "Bedtime Lullaby," which first appeared in an animated featurette on an episode of the children's show Yo Gabba Gabba! (season 1/episode 5), and an acoustic version of Stephen Sondheim's "Send in the Clowns" recorded for the Minneapolis Bridge Disaster benefit CD. The album also includes radio show rarities, a previously unreleased version of Hüsker Dü's "Celebrated Summer" and two previously unreleased instrumentals, "The Piano Song" and "Gaping Mouth."

The Finally LP was released on 12" vinyl in October 2009, and features two exclusive bonus tracks: a cover of "Indian Summer" (originally by The Doors) and a live version of "Send in the Clowns."

== Track listing ==
1. "Piano Song" (Kozelek) – 1:44
2. "Finally" (Kath Bloom) – 2:11
3. "New Partner" (Will Oldham) – 3:34
4. "Send in the Clowns" (Stephen Sondheim) – 2:55
5. "Lazy" (Alan Sparhawk, Mimi Parker, Zak Sally) – 3:30
6. "Bedtime Lullaby" (Jarond Gibbs) – 1:31
7. "Celebrated Summer" (Bob Mould) – 3:37
8. "My Friend Bob" (Dom Leone) – 2:59
9. "If You Want Blood" (Live in Lisbon) (Bon Scott, Angus Young, Malcolm Young) – 3:11
10. "Gaping Mouth" (Kozelek) – 5:12

Vinyl-only bonus track

11. "Indian Summer" (Jim Morrison)
12. "Send in the Clowns" (Live) (Stephen Sondheim)

== Credits ==
- Mark Kozelek - vocals, guitar, producer
- Anthony Koutsos - percussion
- Dylan Magierek - engineer
- Aaron Prellwitz - engineer, mastering
- Nyree Watts - photography
- David Rager - design
