= Actual Wolf =

American drummer

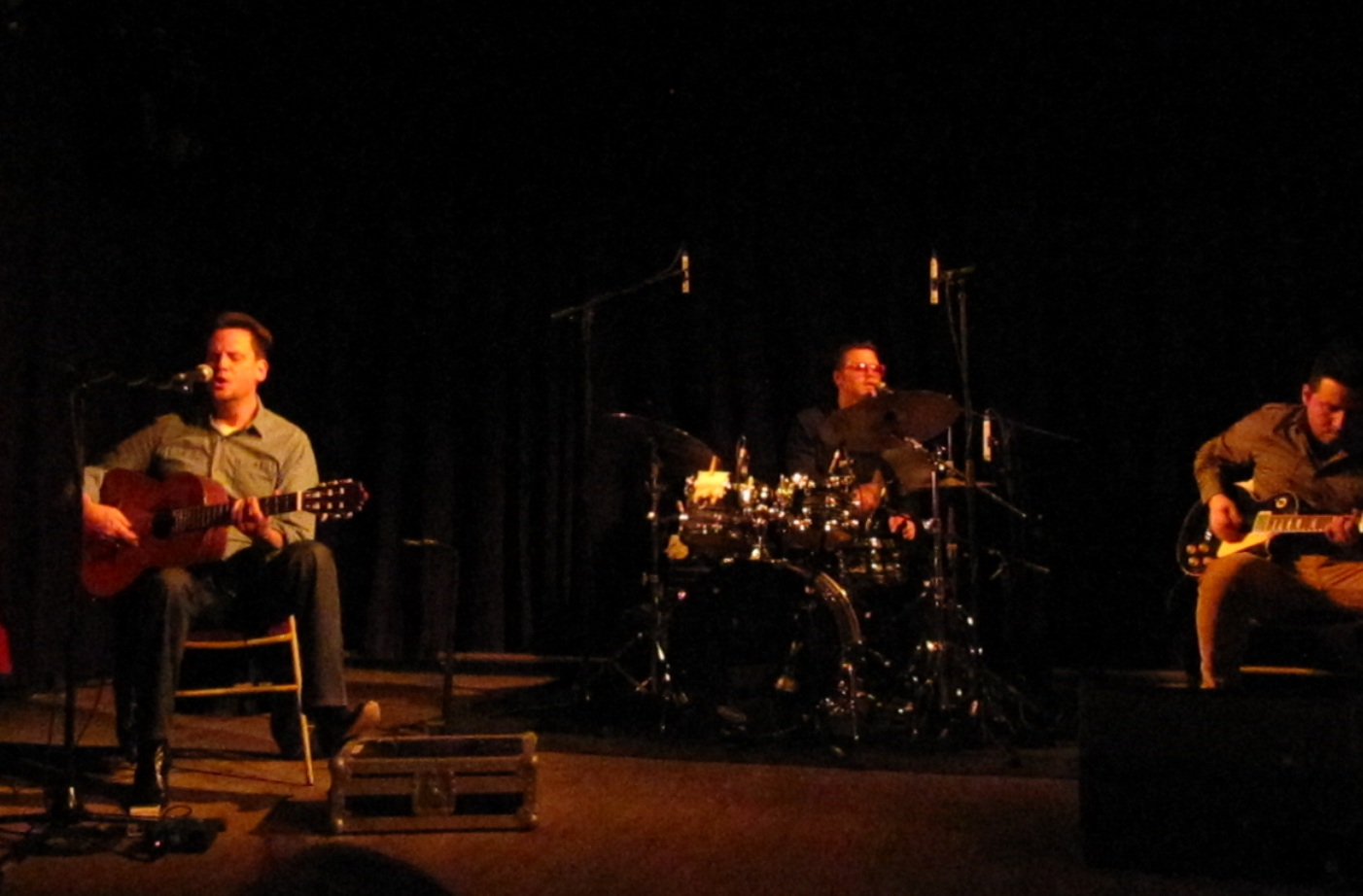
- Actual Wolf on drums as a member of Sun Kil Moon in Paris in 2014

Background information
- Born: Eric Pollard
- Genres: Indie rock; Americana; indie folk; jazz
- Occupations: Singer/songwriter, musician
- Instruments: Vocals; guitar; drums; piano; percussion; harmonica; bass
- Labels: Red House Records; SubPop

Eric Pollard (born March 21, 1980), known professionally as Actual Wolf, is an American singer-songwriter and instrumentalist best known for his instrumental work in Retribution Gospel Choir, Sun Kil Moon, Low and as the leader and songwriter for his eponymous band Actual Wolf.

== Early life and education ==
Eric Michael Pollard was born on March 21, 1980, and raised in Grand Rapids, Minnesota, in the Iron Range region of the state. His father worked for Itasca County, Minnesota, and his mother was a nurse and flight attendant. He has one sister. All three of his immediate family members are musical, though he is the only one who has pursued music as a profession. Pollard went to high school and participated in early bands with future Trampled By Turtles bass player Tim Saxhaug. After high school he attended the University of Wisconsin Eau Claire, where he met Justin Vernon.

== Career ==
=== Pre Actual Wolf years ===
Pollard was the drummer and a vocalist for Retribution Gospel Choir. RGC, which had begun as a collaboration between Low guitarist and songwriter Alan Sparhawk and Red House Painters and Sun Kil Moon founder Mark Kozelek (who left early in the band's history) was signed to Sub Pop. He also toured as a keyboardist with Low. Shortly thereafter he became a touring member of Sun Kil Moon. He also contributed vocals to the Sun Kil Moon album April.

=== Actual Wolf ===
In 2012, under his new pseudonym, Actual Wolf self released the EP Lightning and the Wolf, which featured vocals by Haley Bonar. This led to a residency at the Turf Club and a show on the main stage at First Avenue in Minneapolis. He placed sixth on the annual "Picked to Click" list by the Twin Cities alternative weekly City Pages.

In 2013 Actual Wolf released an eponymous full-length debut on the Chaperone record label. Once his probationary restrictions were lifted he moved to Nashville to continue his music career. While in Nashville Pollard returned to his roots as an instrumental sideman, touring and recording with the likes of Nikki Lane and JP Harris.

2015 saw the release of the cassette-only collection of Actual Wolf songs Itasca, the title of which refers to Itasca County. Shortly afterward, Actual Wolf relocated to Oakland, California, to pursue work in the burgeoning legal medical marijuana industry while still continuing his songwriting/musical career.

In 2016 Actual Wolf began work on his second full-length, self-produced LP, Faded Days, with Minnesota-based musicians Jeremy Hanson of Tapes 'n Tapes, Jacob Hanson, Steve Garrington (bass player of low), vocalist Al Church and Nashville pedal steel player Ditch Kurtz. The album was released in 2017 on the Red House Records label. During this period Pollard was still living in Oakland. It was there that he began to assemble a regular full-time touring band, eventually recruiting Bay Area lead guitarist Misisipi Mike Wolf, pedal steel player Ian Taylor Sutton, keyboardist Kirby Hammel (formerly a touring member of Sun Kil Moon), drummer Andrew Griffin (Cake, Camper Van Beethoven) and bassist Ted O'Connell.
