= Mark Kozelek Sings Christmas Carols =

Studio album by Mark Kozelek
- Released: November 4, 2014
- Genre: Christmas, folk rock
- Length: 41:55
- Label: Caldo Verde
- Producer: Mark Kozelek

Mark Kozelek chronology
Benji (2014)	Mark Kozelek Sings Christmas Carols (2014)	Universal Themes (2015)

Mark Kozelek Sings Christmas Carols is a Christmas album by American singer-songwriter Mark Kozelek. It was released on November 4, 2014, through Kozelek's own record label, Caldo Verde Records.

== Background ==
All songs were recorded by Mark Kozelek in November–December 2013 in San Francisco. The album was announced in December 2013.

== Critical reception ==
Professional ratings
Aggregate scores
Source	Rating
Metacritic	76/100
Review scores
Source	Rating
Exclaim!	8/10
The Independent	4/5 stars
NME	7/10
Pitchfork	6.8/10
PopMatters	7/10

Upon its release, Sings Christmas Carols received positive reviews from music critics. At Metacritic, which assigns a normalized rating out of 100 to reviews from critics, the album received an average score of 76, which indicates "generally favorable reviews", based on 9 reviews. Exclaim! critic Cam Lindsay wrote: "While Sings Christmas Carols could provide any miserable person some relief at Christmastime, it also works nicely for anyone who loves these songs to hear someone other than Michael Bublé or Justin Bieber sing them." Andy Gill of The Independent stated that "it's the gap between his character and the songs’ sentiments that gives this album its curious appeal."

Barry Nicolson of NME commented: "The Sun Kil Moon frontman may revel in the role of indie-rock’s great white grinch, but as Sings Christmas Carols proves, he’s no more immune to the spirit of the season than his furry green counterpart was." Pitchfork critic Mark Richardson noted: " It’s just voice and guitar throughout, but Kozelek’s nylon string work is consistently engaging, even as he falls back on some of his go-to fingerpicking patterns." Maria Schurr of PopMatters compared the album to Sun Kil Moon's 2014 album, Benji, describing it as "an album that operates in places and moods we may not always feel comfortable venturing into or putting on, but works wonders for personal and spiritual growth."

== Track listing ==
Track listing
No.	Title	Writer(s)	Length
1.	"Christmas Time Is Here"	Lee Mendelson, Vince Guaraldi	3:58
2.	"Do You Hear What I Hear?"	Gloria Shayne Baker, Noël Regney	2:46
3.	"2000 Miles" (The Pretenders cover)	Chrissie Hynde	2:50
4.	"O Come, All ye Faithful"	Traditional	2:07
5.	"O Christmas Tree"	Traditional	2:56
6.	"Away in a Manger"	Traditional	1:58
7.	"O Little Town of Bethlehem"	Traditional	2:54
8.	"God Rest Ye Merry, Gentlemen"	Traditional	3:11
9.	"Silent Night"	Franz Xaver Gruber, Joseph Mohr	2:58
10.	"The First Noel"	Traditional	4:53
11.	"I Believe in Father Christmas" (Greg Lake cover)	Greg Lake, Peter Sinfield	2:46
12.	"Hark! The Herald Angels Sing"	Traditional	2:06
13.	"What Child Is This?"	Traditional	2:44
14.	"The Christmas Song"	Bob Wells, Mel Tormé	3:48

== Personnel ==
- Mark Kozelek – performance, production, photography
- Joshua Raoul Brody – piano (14)
- Nathan Winter – engineering
- Brian Azer – design
