= Like Rats =

Studio album by Mark Kozelek
- Released: February 19, 2013
- Recorded: April 16, 2011 – October 21, 2012; San Francisco
- Genre: Indie folk
- Length: 32:31
- Label: Caldo Verde Records
- Producer: Mark Kozelek

Mark Kozelek chronology
| Among the Leaves (2012) | Like Rats (2013) | Perils From The Sea (2013) |

Like Rats is a studio album by American singer-songwriter Mark Kozelek, released on February 19, 2013 on Caldo Verde Records. Self-produced by Kozelek, the album is a collection of acoustic cover songs.

The album was released on the same day as Kozelek's live album, Live at Phoenix Public House Melbourne (2013).

== Critical reception ==
Professional ratings
Aggregate scores
| Source | Rating |
|---|---|
| Metacritic | 64/100 |
Review scores
| Source | Rating |
| Pitchfork Media | 6.7/10 |

Like Rats received mostly positive reviews. At Metacritic, which assigns a normalized rating out of 100 to reviews from mainstream critics, the album has received an average score of 64, based on 6 reviews, indicating "generally favorable reviews". Pitchfork Media's Stephen Deusner gave the album a mostly positive review stating, "His previous covers albums have been fan favorites, presenting his melancholy takes on songs by AC/DC, John Denver, Low, and Stephen Sondheim, but this new collection may be his most varied and adventurous. The track list portrays a man with broad listening habits, who not only translates these songs into his own particular style but erases the distinctions between genres."

== Track listing ==
| No. | Title | Original artist | Length |
|---|---|---|---|
| 1. | "I" | Bad Brains | 2:13 |
| 2. | "Like Rats" | Godflesh | 2:26 |
| 3. | "Free-For-All" | Ted Nugent | 2:16 |
| 4. | "Young Girls" | Bruno Mars | 2:59 |
| 5. | "Right Back Where We Started From" | Maxine Nightingale | 2:24 |
| 6. | "Time Is Love" | Josh Turner | 1:42 |
| 7. | "Silly Girl" | The Descendents | 2:08 |
| 8. | "Onward" | Yes | 2:11 |
| 9. | "Carpet Crawlers" | Genesis | 4:23 |
| 10. | "13" | Danzig | 1:58 |
| 11. | "Green Hell" | The Misfits | 3:09 |
| 12. | "I Killed Mommy" | Dayglo Abortions | 1:24 |
| 13. | "I Got You Babe" | Sonny & Cher | 3:18 |
| Total length: | | | 32:31 |

== Personnel ==
=== Musicians ===
- Mark Kozelek – vocals, acoustic guitar

=== Recording personnel ===
- Mark Kozelek – producer
- Aaron Prellwitz – recording
- Nathan Winter – recording
- Joshua Stoddard – recording
- Gabe Shepard – recording

=== Artwork ===
- Mark Kozelek – photography
- Et Cetera – sleeve design
