= Christmas Time Is Here =

Single by Vince Guaraldi

from the album A Charlie Brown Christmas
- B-side: "What Child Is This?"
- Released: December 1965
- Recorded: September–October 1965
- Genre: Jazz, Christmas
- Length: 6:05 (instrumental version); 2:43 (vocal version)
- Label: Fantasy
- Composer: Vince Guaraldi
- Lyricist: Lee Mendelson

Vince Guaraldi singles chronology
"Theme to Grace" (1965)	"Christmas Time Is Here" (1965)	"I'm a Loser (live)" (1966)

Music video
- "Christmas Time Is Here" on YouTube

"Christmas Time Is Here" is a popular Christmas standard written by Vince Guaraldi and Lee Mendelson for the 1965 CBS television special A Charlie Brown Christmas, one of the first animated Christmas specials produced for network television in the United States.

Two versions were included on the album A Charlie Brown Christmas: an instrumental version by the Vince Guaraldi Trio and a vocal version by choristers from St. Paul's Episcopal Church in San Rafael, California, who had previously performed with Guaraldi on At Grace Cathedral (1965).

== Background ==
"Christmas Time Is Here" was composed by jazz pianist Vince Guaraldi to accompany the opening of the 1965 television special A Charlie Brown Christmas. It was originally written as an instrumental, but producer Lee Mendelson decided that the song needed lyrics. Mendelson recalled, "When we looked at the show about a month before it was to go on the air, I said, 'That's such a pretty melody; maybe we should try and find some people to put some lyrics to it.'" When he was unable to find someone available, he wrote the lyrics himself:

So I sat down with an envelope — I'll never forget this — at our kitchen table and wrote 'Christmas Time Is Here' in about ten minutes. It was a poem that just came to me — never changed the words to this day. It was only about a minute long. And Vince got a bunch of little kids together to sing it.

The vocals for the song were provided by the children's choir at St. Paul's Episcopal Church in San Rafael, California. Guaraldi had previously performed with the ensemble at his May 1965 "jazz mass" performance at Grace Cathedral which was released album At Grace Cathedral.

The song has since become a perennial Christmas classic. Drummer Jerry Granelli of the Vince Guaraldi Trio commented, "It's amazing: Vince finally wrote a standard. 'Christmas Time Is Here' has been recorded as a standard, and Vince always wanted to write a standard. So he made it."

In the original 1965 broadcast print of A Charlie Brown Christmas, a broadcast version of this vocal song can be heard in the opening scene along with the Coca-Cola sponsorship segment. This broadcast vocal take, which was not included in the list of recording sessions for the 2022 deluxe album, differs from the album version in that it concludes with "Christmas Time" repeated several times after the last verse.

== Musical composition ==
The song is a waltz composed in F major with an AABA form. During the "B section", the song tonicizes into the key of D-flat major.

Form
A section
FΔ7	E♭7♯11	FΔ7	E♭7♯11
Bø7 B♭-7	A-7 A♭-7	G-7 C13♭9	FΔ7
B section
D♭Δ7	C7♯5♯9	D♭Δ7	C7♯5♯9
A-7	D7♯9	G-7 D♭9#5	C13

== Reception and legacy ==
"Christmas Time Is Here" remains a popular Christmas song long after its release; as Matt Thompson of The Atlantic writes, "If it wasn’t already a standard that first time it was played, it is now the very definition." Erik Adams of The A.V. Club pointed to the song's juxtaposition of nostalgic lyrics and wistful major-key composition as a reason for its longevity: "As 'Christmastime Is Here' and the other songs from A Charlie Brown Christmas have been folded into the catalogue of enduring Christmas carols, they’ve continued to stand out by representing a particular strain of wintry melancholy."

The song has also charted on the Billboard Holiday 100, reaching number 17 in 2017—over 50 years after its original release.

In 2015, Japanese-Australian singer-songwriter Joji sampled the standard in his 2015 trip hop song "you suck charlie".

== Charts and certifications ==
=== Charts ===
Chart performance for "Christmas Time Is Here"
Chart (2017–2026)	Peak position
Australia (ARIA)	79
Canada Hot 100 (Billboard)	27
Global 200 (Billboard)	41
Ireland (IRMA)	83
Latvia Streaming (DigiTop100)	17
Netherlands (Single Tip)	10
Portugal (AFP)	144
Switzerland (Schweizer Hitparade)	99
UK Singles (Official Charts)	70
US Billboard Hot 100	23
US Holiday 100 (Billboard)	17

=== Certifications ===
Region	Certification	Certified units/sales
Canada (Music Canada)	4× Platinum	320,000^{‡}
United Kingdom (BPI)	Silver	200,000^{‡}
United States (RIAA)	Platinum	1,000,000^{‡}
^{‡} Sales+streaming figures based on certification alone.

== Cover versions ==
The first person to record a cover version of the song was jazz guitarist Ron Escheté on the album Christmas Impressions (1982). David Benoit followed him on the album Christmastime (1983). They were followed by Patti Austin on Happy Anniversary, Charlie Brown and Debby Boone on Home for Christmas (both in 1989); Mel Tormé on Christmas Songs (1992), then Rosemary Clooney on White Christmas (1996), R.E.M., Kenny Loggins on December (1998), Stone Temple Pilots, and Grover Washington Jr. for Breath of Heaven: A Holiday Collection (1997) before the turn of the century. After the turn of the century, Toni Braxton recorded the song for her 2001 album Snowflakes, Diana Krall recorded the song for her 2005 album Christmas Songs, and Sarah McLachlan recorded the song for her 2006 album Wintersong (featuring Krall on piano). Tony Bennett recorded the song for his 2008 album A Swingin' Christmas. Mark Kozelek did a version on his album Mark Kozelek Sings Christmas Carols in 2014. Tori Kelly covered the song on her 2020 album A Tori Kelly Christmas. Sissel also sang the song for an EP of the same name in 2021. Pentatonix sang the song as a mash-up with "Pure Imagination" for their 2023 compilation album The Greatest Christmas Hits. Billboard named Alicia Keys’ cover of the song from her holiday album Santa Baby (2022) as the best cover of the song in the 21st century.

== See also ==
- List of cover versions of Vince Guaraldi songs
- List of jazz standards
- Christmas music
