= Tiny Cities =

Studio album by Sun Kil Moon
- Released: November 1, 2005
- Recorded: 2005
- Studio: Hyde Street Studios, San Francisco
- Genre: Folk rock
- Length: 30:29
- Language: English
- Label: Caldo Verde Records
- Producer: Mark Kozelek

Sun Kil Moon chronology
| Ghosts of the Great Highway (2003) | Tiny Cities (2005) | April (2008) |

Professional ratings
Aggregate scores
| Source | Rating |
|---|---|
| Metacritic | 64/100 |
Review scores
| Source | Rating |
| AllMusic | 3.5/5 stars |
| Alternative Press | 4/5 |
| Blender | 4/5 stars |
| The Irish Times | 3/5 stars |
| Mojo | 3/5 stars |
| NME | 6/10 |
| Pitchfork | 3.0/10 |
| Q | 3/5 stars |
| Rolling Stone | 2.5/5 stars |
| Uncut | 3/5 stars |

Tiny Cities is the second studio album by American indie folk act Sun Kil Moon, released November 1, 2005 on Caldo Verde Records. The album features the same lineup as the band's debut, Ghosts of the Great Highway (2003). This album was chosen as one of Amazon.com's Top 100 Editor's Picks of 2005 (see 2005 in music).

The full-length album is composed of covers of songs by Modest Mouse, released on Kozelek's own label, Caldo Verde Records. Much like his AC/DC tribute What's Next to the Moon, Kozelek has re-interpreted the often complicated, rhythmically complex songs of Modest Mouse into delicate, acoustic-guitar-led ballads.

In a February 2014 interview with Seattle's The Stranger, Kozelek commented that he's "never heard from Modest Mouse" as to what they think of the record. However, in a later conversation with Ben Gibbard, Kozelek said that he met Modest Mouse singer Isaac Brock "in Austin, and we talked about life insurance and making albums. He thanked me for making Tiny Cities, and that made my day!".

== Track listing ==
All songs written by Isaac Brock, Eric Judy, and Jeremiah Green, except for "Ocean Breathes Salty" written by Brock, Judy, and Dann Gallucci.

=== CD ===
1. "Exit Does Not Exist" (from This Is a Long Drive for Someone with Nothing to Think About, 1996) – 1:24
2. "Tiny Cities Made of Ashes" (from The Moon & Antarctica, 2000) – 3:13
3. "Neverending Math Equation" (from Never Ending Math Equation, 1998) – 2:53
4. "Space Travel Is Boring" (from This Is a Long Drive for Someone with Nothing to Think About, 1996) – 3:42
5. "Dramamine" (from This Is a Long Drive for Someone with Nothing to Think About, 1996) – 2:44
6. "Jesus Christ Was an Only Child" (from The Lonesome Crowded West, 1997) – 1:59
7. "Four Fingered Fisherman" (from Sad Sappy Sucker, 2001) – 2:41
8. "Grey Ice Water" (from Other People's Lives, 1998) – 2:32
9. "Convenient Parking" (from The Lonesome Crowded West, 1997) – 1:56
10. "Trucker's Atlas" (from The Lonesome Crowded West, 1997) – 2:49
11. "Ocean Breathes Salty" (from Good News for People Who Love Bad News, 2004) – 4:36

=== Double 12" vinyl ===
Side A:

1. "Exit Does Not Exist" – 1:24
2. "Tiny Cities Made of Ashes" – 3:13
3. "Neverending Math Equation" – 2:53
4. "Space Travel Is Boring" – 3:42
5. "Dramamine" – 2:44
6. "Jesus Christ Was an Only Child" – 1:59

Side B:

1. "Four Fingered Fisherman" – 2:41
2. "Grey Ice Water" – 2:32
3. "Convenient Parking" – 1:56
4. "Trucker's Atlas" – 2:49
5. "Ocean Breathes Salty" – 4:36
6. "Exit Does Not Exist" (Alternate Version) – 1:41

Bonus one-sided 12" EP (subtitled Mark Kozelek – Live Acoustic):

1. "Trucker's Atlas" (Live Acoustic)
2. "Neverending Math Equation" (Live Acoustic)
3. "Convenient Parking" (Live Acoustic)
4. "Tiny Cities Made of Ashes" (Live Acoustic)
5. "Four Fingered Fisherman" (Live Acoustic)
6. "Dramamine" (Live Acoustic)
7. "Jesus Christ Was an Only Child" (Live Acoustic)
