= All the Best =

All the Best may refer to:

== Film ==
- All the Best: Fun Begins, a 2009 Bollywood comedy film
- All the Best (film), a 2012 Telugu-language film directed by J. D. Chakravarthy

== Literature ==
- All the Best (book), a 1999 book by George H. W. Bush
- All the Best, a play by Feroz Abbas Khan

== Music ==
=== Albums ===
- All the Best (EMI compilation album series), 2012
- All the Best (Glen Campbell album), 2003
- All the Best (John Paul Young album), 1977
- All the Best (John Williamson album), 1986
- All the Best (Leo Sayer album), 1993
- All the Best (Stiff Little Fingers album), 1983
- All the Best (Tina Turner album), 2004
  - All the Best: The Live Collection, a DVD by Tina Turner, 2005
- All the Best (Zucchero album), 2007
- All the Best!, by Paul McCartney, 1987
- All the Best! 1999–2009, by Arashi, 2009
- All the Best, Isaac Hayes, 2020
- All the Best from Prism, by Prism, 1980
- Sinatra 80th: All the Best, by Frank Sinatra, 1995
- All the Best, by Chemistry, 2006
- All the Best, by Cookies, 2003
- All the Best, by Jean-Pierre Danel, 2002
- All the Best, by Joe Pizzulo, 2005
- All the Best, by Tiffany Darwish, 1996
- All the Best, by UB40, 2012

=== Songs ===
- "All the Best", by John Prine from The Missing Years, 1991
- "All the Best", by R.E.M. from Collapse into Now, 2011
