= Retribution Gospel Choir (album) =

Studio album by Retribution Gospel Choir
- Released: March 18, 2008; May 20, 2008 (vinyl)
- Recorded: Hyde Street Studios, San Francisco, California
- Genre: Alternative rock
- Length: 30:13
- Label: Caldo Verde Records
- Producer: Mark Kozelek

Retribution Gospel Choir chronology
Retribution Gospel Choir (2008)	2 (2010)

Professional ratings
Review scores
Source	Rating
Allmusic	4/5 stars

Retribution Gospel Choir is the eponymous debut album from the American musical group band Retribution Gospel Choir, led by Alan Sparhawk of the band Low. The album was released in the US on March 18, 2008, through Mark Kozelek's Caldo Verde Records. Kozelek also produced the album.

According to the Caldo Verde website, the album is a major shift from the slow, minimalist music of Low:

Low visionary Alan Sparhawk cranks the amps for a radical stylistic departure. Crude, mangy guitars collide with trudging stoner-rock rhythms and some catchy melodies -- for modern-day spirituals that defy all preconceptions.

The first 1,000 copies pressed came with a 4 track bonus disc, titled RGC DUB, featuring untitled dub recordings. This version was only available through the Caldo Verde Records website link. The album was also pressed on limited edition vinyl in May 2008 and sold exclusively through Aural Exploits' website. The songs "Take Your Time" and "Breaker" first appeared on the Low album Drums and Guns in 2007 but were originally Retribution Gospel Choir songs.

== Track listing ==
All songs written by Alan Sparhawk.

1. "They Knew You Well" - 3:41
2. "Take Your Time" - 4:06
3. "Breaker" - 2:06
4. "Somebody's Someone" - 2:56
5. "Destroyer" - 3:33
6. "Holes in Our Heads" - 2:59
7. "What She Turned Into" - 2:22
8. "For Her Blood" - 2:10
9. "Kids" - 4:06
10. "Easy Prey" - 2:14

=== RGC DUB: bonus disc ===
1. "(Untitled)" - 6:52
2. "(Untitled)" - 6:42
3. "(Untitled)" - 4:21
4. "(Untitled)" - 12:48

== Musicians ==
- Alan Sparhawk - vocals, guitar
- Eric Pollard - drums, vocals
- Matt Livingston - bass
- Mimi Parker - vocals on "Breaker"

== Label ==
Caldo Verde Records Catalog#: 14064 Format: CD, Vinyl, Limited Edition
