= Eric Pollard (disambiguation) =

Eric Pollard may refer to:

- Eric Pollard, character on the British soap opera Emmerdale
- Eric Pollard (skier), American freeskier
- Eric Pollard, American musician who records as Actual Wolf
