= 7 Songs Belfast =

EP by Mark Kozelek
- Released: July 1, 2008
- Recorded: October–November 2007
- Genre: Folk rock
- Length: 39:40
- Language: English
- Label: Caldo Verde Records
- Producer: Mark Kozelek

Mark Kozelek chronology
Nights LP (2008)	7 Songs Belfast (2008)	The Finally LP (2008)

Professional ratings
Review scores
Source	Rating
Pitchfork Media	(7.2/10)

7 Songs Belfast is a live EP by Mark Kozelek. The limited edition CD was made available in July 2008, as a free gift with any order of a CD, t-shirt or vinyl record purchased via Caldo Verde Records' website. Starting from September 1, 2008, the EP was made available as a digital download. Tracks 1–6 were recorded live at the Black Box in Belfast on November 4, 2007, and track 7 was recorded live at the Dancehouse Theatre in Manchester on October 30, 2007.

== Track listing ==
All tracks are written by Mark Kozelek, except where noted.

No.	Title	Length
1.	"Michigan"	5:09
2.	"Around and Around" (John Denver)	2:19
3.	"River"	6:20
4.	"Gentle Moon"	4:55
5.	"Carry Me Ohio"	5:46
6.	"San Geronimo"	5:28
7.	"Tonight in Bilbao"	9:45

== Notes ==
- Mark Kozelek – vocals, guitar
- Phil Carney – guitar
- Photography by Nyree Watts
- Design by Brian Azer
