= Mark Kozelek & Desertshore =

Studio album by Mark Kozelek and Desertshore
- Released: August 20, 2013
- Genre: Indie rock
- Length: 44:21
- Language: English
- Label: Caldo Verde Records

Mark Kozelek chronology
Perils from the Sea (2013)	Mark Kozelek & Desertshore (2013)	Benji (2014)

Desertshore chronology
Mark Kozelek & Desertshore (2013)

Mark Kozelek & Desertshore is a collaborative studio album by American singer-songwriter Mark Kozelek and indie rock band Desertshore, released on August 20, 2013 on Caldo Verde Records. The album was Kozelek's third studio album of 2013.

In 2015, the American metal band Cult Leader covered the track "You Are Not of My Blood" for their Useless Animal EP.

== Reception ==
Professional ratings
Aggregate scores
Source	Rating
Metacritic	78/100
Review scores
Source	Rating
AllMusic	4/5 stars
Pitchfork Media	7.9/10.0

At Metacritic, which assigns a weighted average score out of 100 to reviews and ratings from mainstream critics, the album has received a metascore of 78, based on 6 reviews, indicating "generally favorable reviews".

== Track listing ==
No.	Title	Length
1.	"Mariette"	3:01
2.	"Livingstone Bramble"	5:00
3.	"Hey You Bastards I'm Still Here"	4:03
4.	"Katowice or Cologne"	3:44
5.	"Seal Rock Hotel"	2:58
6.	"Tavoris Cloud"	3:33
7.	"You Are Not of My Blood"	5:58
8.	"Sometimes I Can't Stop"	6:41
9.	"Don't Ask About My Husband"	2:27
10.	"Brothers"	6:56
