= Admiral Fell Promises =

Studio album by Sun Kil Moon
- Released: July 13, 2010
- Genres: Folk rock, contemporary classical
- Length: 60:44; 13:47 (bonus disc)
- Language: English
- Label: Caldo Verde
- Producer: Mark Kozelek

Sun Kil Moon chronology
April (2008)	Admiral Fell Promises (2010)	Among the Leaves (2012)

Admiral Fell Promises is the fourth studio album by American indie folk act Sun Kil Moon, released on July 13, 2010 on Caldo Verde Records. Despite being released under the Sun Kil Moon moniker, the album features Mark Kozelek performing solo on acoustic nylon-string guitar. Along with the standard CD release, the album was also released on vinyl in October 2010, which includes liner notes, lyrics, and two bonus tracks recorded live in Saint-Malo, France.

Regarding the album, Kozelek noted: "With this record, I had a vision in mind. I wanted to make something that was very personal, that had a theme and a flow, musically." Kozelek has subsequently named Admiral Fell Promises the album he is most proud of recording, stating, "Bury me with [Admiral Fell Promises]. That album is me at my best, my most focused. It's cohesive, beautiful and my playing was inspired by the legendary Andrés Segovia".

A live version of the title track previously appeared on Mark Kozelek's 2001 solo release, White Christmas Live.

== Background and recording ==
Regarding the decision to record Admiral Fell Promises alone on an acoustic nylon-string guitar, Mark Kozelek noted: "I was interested in classical guitar when I was younger, but got away from it. A few years ago, I picked up a Segovia five-CD set in New Zealand. Then came home, bought some classical records – by Liona Boyd, Ana Vidovic, Julian Bream. But I really fell in love with this record by Segovia. It's just called Segovia, composed by Tansman, Federico Mompou, and Maria Esteban de Valera. It was then that I decided, for my next record, that I wanted to play guitar and sing as beautifully as I could. With the classical guitar, the whole range of sounds is covered. Bass and drums would have swamped up the sound of this record. I wanted it to have the feel of those old classical guitar records."

Kozelek would subsequently record the songs as he wrote them with engineer Aaron Prellwitz. Kozelek stated, "When I wrote a few songs over the past year, my friend Aaron would fly down and record them. We did that off and on from April of last year until April of this year. If you record a song while it’s fresh, the odds of you being happy with it are stronger. It’s when you've played a song a million times that you find yourself struggling to find the spark that made it good the first time."

== Critical reception ==
Professional ratings
Aggregate scores
Source	Rating
AnyDecentMusic?	7.2/10
Metacritic	77/100
Review scores
Source	Rating
AllMusic	4/5 stars
The A.V. Club	B+
Billboard	4.5/5 stars
The Boston Phoenix	4/4 stars
Mojo	4/5 stars
Pitchfork	7.0/10
Rolling Stone	3.5/5 stars
Spin	6/10
The Sunday Times	5/5 stars
Uncut	4/5 stars

Admiral Fell Promises was released to generally positive reviews. At Metacritic, which assigns a normalized rating out of 100 based on reviews from mainstream critics, the album has received a favorable score of 77, which indicates "generally favorable reviews", based on 16 reviews. AllMusic reviewer Thom Jurek wrote: "Admiral Fell Promises is the simplest Sun Kil Moon album in terms of production and presentation, but the richest in terms of structural complexity, and poetic and emotional power." Steven Hayden of The A.V. Club stated that "Kozelek's Dylan-esque knack for delivering intensely internal narratives over simple folk melodies stretched out for several hypnotic minutes has once again resulted in top-notch mood music." Zeth Lundy of The Boston Phoenix commented that "Kozelek's picking and phrasing combine Andrés Segovia with José González and even flamenco flourishes — whatever you want to call it, it's light years ahead of the obvious strumming that permeates the singer-songwriter field." Pitchfork critic Stephen M. Deusner stated: "Despite some lyrical clichés and careless redundancies, Kozelek's songs change mood fluidly, and the contrast between the serene settings and his own tumultuous thoughts raises even the most languid instrumental passages above mere aural wallpaper, lending it the gravity of his best work while giving it a character all its own."

Evan Sawdey of PopMatters wrote: "By stripping away all those additional bells and whistles from Sun Kil Moon's sound, an unintentional side-effect is achieved: the whole thing turns out to be a bit too monochromatic." David Marchese of Spin described the record as a "beautifully recorded, intermittently moving" album. Matthew Cole of Slant Magazine commented: "Judged as an expansion on Kozelek's craft, Admiral Fell Promises is a slight effort; it offers intimate perspective, sure, but the object of observation remains the same." Sputnikmusic critic Jared Ponton thought: "When held up against prior Sun Kil Moon efforts, Ghosts of the Great Highway and April, Admiral Fell Promises can't help but come across as a disappointment."

== Track listing ==
All tracks are written by Mark Kozelek.

No.	Title	Length
1.	"Ålesund"	6:26
2.	"Half Moon Bay"	6:53
3.	"Sam Wong Hotel"	5:10
4.	"Third and Seneca"	7:14
5.	"You Are My Sun"	4:55
6.	"Admiral Fell Promises"	3:51
7.	"The Leaning Tree"	7:54
8.	"Australian Winter"	4:40
9.	"Church of the Pines"	6:05
10.	"Bay of Skulls"	7:36

Vinyl-only bonus tracks
No.	Title	Length
11.	"Australian Winter" (Live in Saint-Malo)
12.	"Blue Orchids" (Live in Saint-Malo)

== I'll Be There EP ==
A bonus EP titled I'll Be There was included with all purchases from Caldo Verde Records' website only upon the album's release date. Three of the four tracks are cover versions, with songs by Stereolab, Casiotone for the Painfully Alone, and The Jackson 5 reinterpreted. "I'll Be There" was originally performed live by Kozelek in the aftermath of Michael Jackson's death.

No.	Title	Writer(s)	Length
1.	"Third and Seneca" (Alternate Version)	Mark Kozelek	7:41
2.	"Tomorrow Is Already Here"	Tim Gane, Lætitia Sadier	2:10
3.	"Natural Light"	Owen Ashworth	1:38
4.	"I'll Be There"	Berry Gordy, Bob West, Hal Davis, Willie Hutch	2:20

== Personnel ==
Sun Kil Moon

- Mark Kozelek – performance, composition, production

Other personnel

- Aaron Prellwitz – engineering
- Nyree Watts – photography
- David Rager – design

== Chart positions ==
Chart (2010)	Peak position
US Billboard 200	118
US Billboard Alternative Albums	22
US Billboard Folk Albums	2
US Billboard Heatseekers Albums	1
US Billboard Independent Albums	14
US Billboard Top Rock Albums	37
US Billboard Tastemaker Albums	13
