= Retribution Gospel Choir =

Indie rock band

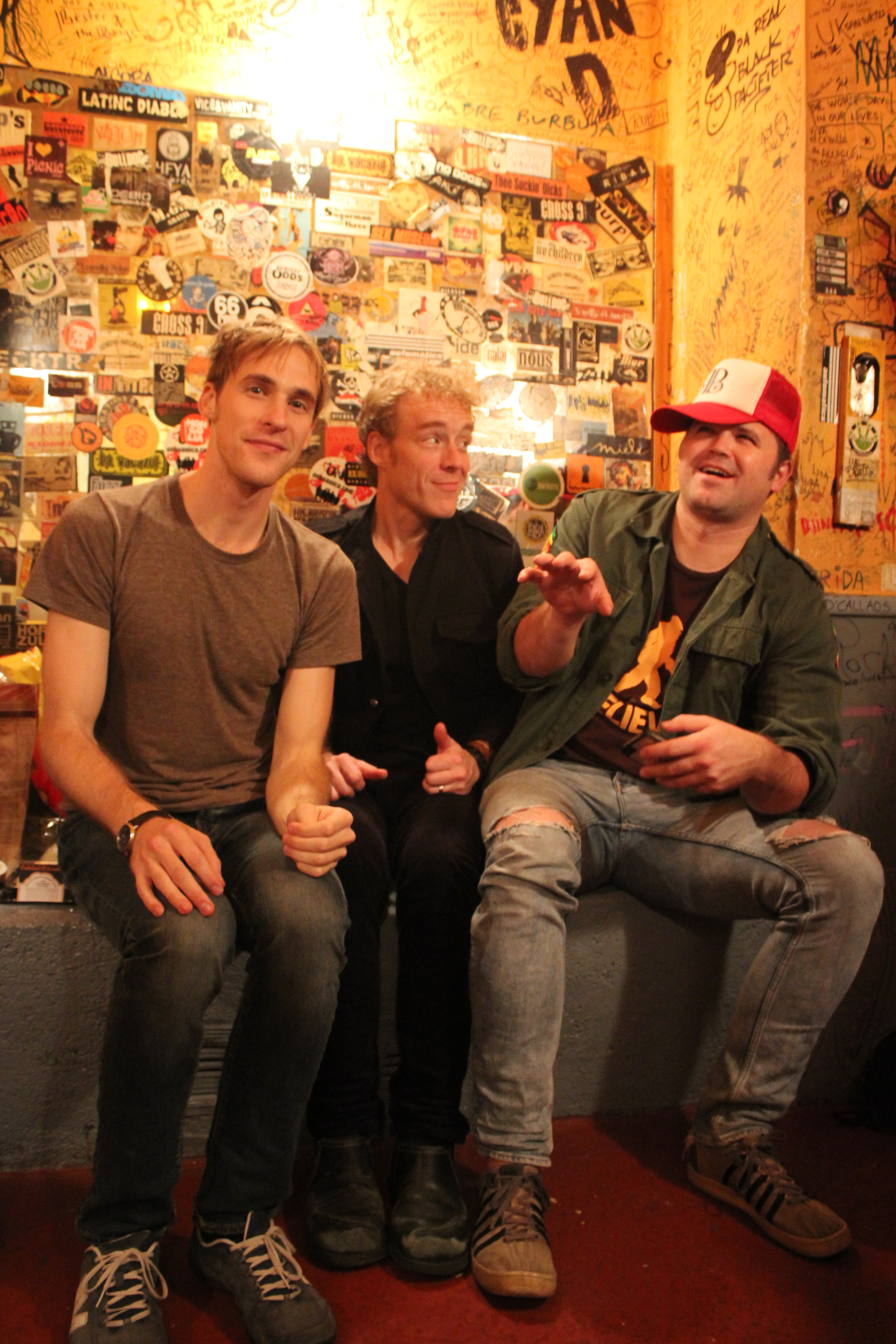
- Retribution Gospel Choir in 2013

Background information
- Origin: Duluth, Minnesota
- Genres: Indie rock
- Labels: Caldo Verde Records, Sub Pop
- Members: Alan Sparhawk; Steve Garrington; Eric Pollard
- Past members: Matt Livingston

Retribution Gospel Choir is an indie rock band based in Duluth, Minnesota. Current members of the band include Alan Sparhawk (guitar, vocals, sampler) and Steve Garrington (bass), both of whom were also in the band Low, and Eric Pollard (drums, vocals). Despite sharing the majority of their members, RGC's high-energy performance differs greatly from Low's subdued, minimalist feel.

Until 2008, Matt Livingston, also bassist with Low, played bass for the band. Sparhawk's wife and Low bandmate Mimi Parker appears on vocals on one Retribution Gospel Choir track.

The band's 2008 self-titled debut studio album received a 7.5 rating from Pitchfork, whose reviewer Mike McGonigal noted, "To address the album on 70s turf, Retribution Gospel Choir may not be as great as a Neil Young with Crazy Horse album, but it's better than any of the albums Crazy Horse made on their own."

== Discography ==
Studio albums

- Retribution Gospel Choir (2008)
- 2 (2010)
- 3 (2013)

EPs

- The Revolution EP (2012)

Appear on

- Twin Town High, Music Yearbook Volume 09 (2007)
- Leak- Volume #5 (2008)

== Musicians ==
- Alan Sparhawk - vocals, guitar
- Eric Pollard - drums, vocals
- Steve Garrington - bass
- Mimi Parker - vocals on "Breaker"
- Matt Livingston - bass (2007–2008)
