= All the Best, Isaac Hayes =

Studio album by Mark Kozelek
- Released: April 24, 2020
- Genre: Spoken word
- Length: 95:00
- Label: Caldo Verde Records
- Producer: Mark Kozelek

Mark Kozelek chronology
Mark Kozelek with Ben Boye & Jim White 2 (2020)	All the Best, Isaac Hayes (2020)

Professional ratings
Review scores
Source	Rating
AllMusic	3.5/5 stars

All the Best, Isaac Hayes is a studio album by the American singer and songwriter Mark Kozelek, released on April 24, 2020 on Caldo Verde Records. Recorded between October and November 2019, it is Kozelek's thirty-first studio album.

The album features spoken word, stream of consciousness compositions with piano accompaniment throughout. Its lyrical content focuses on Kozelek's experiences during a 2019 North American tour and its aftermath.

== Track listing ==
All tracks are written by Mark Kozelek.

No.	Title	Length
1.	"San Francisco"	7:47
2.	"Vancouver"	5:37
3.	"Calgary"	9:43
4.	"Winnipeg"	10:07
5.	"Ottawa"	15:35
6.	"Buffalo Valley Rest Area Smith County Welcome Center"	10:45
7.	"Highway 81"	8:53
8.	"Los Angeles"	21:51
9.	"November"	4:59
Total length:		95:00
