= Among the Leaves =

Studio album by Sun Kil Moon
- Released: May 29, 2012
- Recorded: October 2011 – January 2012
- Genre: Indie folk
- Length: 73:20
- Language: English
- Label: Caldo Verde
- Producer: Mark Kozelek

Sun Kil Moon chronology
Admiral Fell Promises (2010)	Among the Leaves (2012)	Benji (2014)

Mark Kozelek chronology
Admiral Fell Promises (2010)	Among the Leaves (2012)	Like Rats (2013)

Among the Leaves is the fifth studio album by American indie folk act Sun Kil Moon, released on May 29, 2012 on Caldo Verde Records. Similar to Sun Kil Moon's previous studio album, Admiral Fell Promises (2010), the album is predominantly performed by founding member Mark Kozelek on a nylon-string guitar.

In 2013, Mark Kozelek released a live album recorded shortly after Among the Leaves' release, entitled Live at Phoenix Public House Melbourne.

The album was listed 41st on Stereogum's list of top 50 albums of 2012.

== Background and recording ==
In a similar fashion to Sun Kil Moon's previous album, Admiral Fell Promises (2010), Among the Leaves was recorded primarily by founding member Mark Kozelek on a nylon string guitar, with the assistance of session musicians on certain tracks. Regarding his decision to continue recording alone, Kozelek noted, "Nylon string is still a new love and I'm not tired of it yet. Record sales are on their way out and I can't afford to make Dark Side of the Moon nor do I have the interest. I'm 45 and I don't have time to spend two years of my life bringing in producers and dragging the record around the planet. I'm always moving forward creatively and don't like stalling, trying to find the perfect snare drum sound."

Kozelek would record the album's songs quickly after writing them, noting, "I don't make demos. I don't have the interest or the energy or the time. Demos are something you do in the early stages of your career, but when you get going, you just go in and record the song. With this record, I wanted to give my first instincts a chance without shooting them down immediately, which I sometimes do. Songs like "Song For Richard Collopy" and "Not Much Rhymes With Everything's Awesome All the Time" were very impulsive, even my engineers were looking at me like, "What in the fuck are you doing?" And that's exactly the reaction I wanted. I didn't want to put myself, or anyone else, asleep with another quintessential Mark Kozelek album."

== Writing and composition ==
Regarding the album's lengthy track listing, which includes seventeen tracks, Mark Kozelek noted, "Recording a standard ten-song album is a concept I chose to make fun of on this record. [...] As far as the length, I wanted to challenge myself and do something out of the ordinary. When I was young, a gatefold album by Pink Floyd or Led Zeppelin was something to get excited about, something you longed for. I wanted to remind people that there was a time when music required an attention span. I could have easily doubled my profit and made two records out of Among the Leaves, but the songs represented a certain period and it made sense to get it out there as one piece."

The album's lyrical content frequently focuses upon life as a touring musician and the nature of songwriting, with Kozelek stating, "When you're a touring musician, you're always turning over new rocks and there's always a certain level of tension in your life. The music business, and the travel that comes with it, is stressful, challenging, redundant, exhausting, exciting, and often very depressing. After all of these years, I'm still trying to cope with aspects of it."

== Critical reception ==
Professional ratings
Aggregate scores
Source	Rating
AnyDecentMusic?	6.9/10
Metacritic	72/100
Review scores
Source	Rating
AllMusic	3/5 stars
The A.V. Club	B
The Boston Phoenix	2.5/4 stars
Consequence of Sound	3.5/5 stars
The Irish Times	3/5 stars
Mojo	4/5 stars
The Observer	4/5 stars
Pitchfork	6.8/10
Q	3/5 stars
Uncut	8/10

Upon its release, Among the Leaves received fairly positive reviews. At Metacritic, which assigns a weighted average score out of 100 to reviews and ratings from mainstream critics, the album has received a score of 72, based on 23 reviews, indicating "generally favorable reviews".

In a positive review, AllMusic's James Christopher Monger stated: "The fifth outing for Mark Kozelek under the Sun Kil Moon moniker follows in the quiet footsteps of 2010's excellent Admiral Fell Promises. Looser and less polished than its predecessor, Among the Leaves finds Kozelek in a mercilessly nostalgic mood, especially on the first three tracks, which play out like a post-rock & roll Lothario trilogy." The A.V. Club's Colleen Powers praised the album's dark lyrical content, writing: " [The song, "Track Number 8", is] a crushing moment, and somehow more bravely biographical than another ballad for an absent woman. It's on these darker songs that Kozelek's fresh urgency provides a needed spark to his familiar sorrow." Similarly, The Observer's Kitty Empire wrote: "[Kozelek] can still drag tears from hardened hacks with his "Song for Richard Collopy", a threnody for his late guitar restorer, whose devastation lies in its affectionate detail." Laura Snapes of Pitchfork stated: "[Kozelek] is the kind of talented songwriter that can mostly pull that off; though for a record so spare and simple, Among the Leaves comes off as strangely confrontational." Stereogum named Among the Leaves "Album of the Week" upon its release, writing: "It's art about, for the most part, shitty personality traits, but rendered beautifully."

Consequence of Sound critic Drew Litowitz wrote: "With 17 tracks, Kozelek proves that he in fact can write a song under the five-minute mark, can be bright and bereaved in equal measure, and can even have a little fun doing this whole music thing." Daniel Paton of musicOMH described the album as "a bold, honest and carefree collection that, rather than announcing Kozelek's frustrated retirement, seems set to point to new and exciting musical adventures." PopMatters critic Matthew Fiander stated: "The best parts of Among the Leaves show Kozelek stepping out from behind the blurry, echoing melancholy of his sound and showing us his humor, his insight, his knack for storytelling." Nevertheless, he also added: "There's enough of that to make this record solid, but the sad fact is that Mark Kozelek is also trying to put walls up between us and him through too much of this 73-minute record, and the truth is he succeeds there too, to his own detriment." Beca Grimm of Paste commented: "All the sullen lyricism dulls any chance of frisky spark. This does not make it a bad album, but it was a bit of a disappointment." Slant Magazine reviewer Jesse Cataldo wrote: Among the Leaves may not be the most captivating way to spend 70 minutes, but it's a valuable effort nonetheless, a deeply felt record of one man's never-ending struggle with himself."

== Track listing ==
No.	Title	Length
1.	"I Know It's Pathetic but That Was the Greatest Night of My Life"	1:47
2.	"Sunshine in Chicago"	2:34
3.	"The Moderately Talented Yet Attractive Young Woman vs. The Exceptionally Talented Yet Not So Attractive Middle Aged Man"	3:44
4.	"That Bird Has a Broken Wing"	2:31
5.	"Elaine"	5:15
6.	"The Winery"	4:26
7.	"Young Love"	6:43
8.	"Song for Richard Collopy"	3:29
9.	"Among the Leaves"	3:31
10.	"Red Poison"	1:52
11.	"Track Number 8"	5:16
12.	"Not Much Rhymes with Everything's Awesome at All Times"	3:15
13.	"King Fish"	6:39
14.	"Lonely Mountain"	5:29
15.	"UK Blues"	6:16
16.	"UK Blues 2"	4:58
17.	"Black Kite"	5:35

== Personnel ==
Sun Kil Moon

- Mark Kozelek - vocals, guitars, additional instruments, production

Additional musicians

- Michi Aceret - viola
- Mike Stevens - drums
- Eric Embry - banjo and additional vocals (7)
- Dave Muench - drums (15)

Recording personnel

- Gabriel Shepard - recording, mixing
- Aaron Prellwitz - recording, mixing

Artwork

- Brian Azer - sleeve design
- Barry Tribuzio - photography

== Charts ==
Chart (2012)	Peak position
US Billboard Folk Albums	8
US Billboard Heatseekers Albums	6
US Billboard Independent Albums	46
US Billboard Tastemaker Albums	25
