= 2 (Retribution Gospel Choir album) =

Studio album by Retribution Gospel Choir
- Released: January 26, 2010
- Genre: Alternative rock, indie-rock
- Label: Sub Pop

Retribution Gospel Choir chronology
Retribution Gospel Choir (2008)	2 (2010)

Professional ratings
Review scores
Source	Rating
Allmusic	3/5 stars
Drowned In Sound	7/10 stars
War on Pop	6.5/10 stars

2 is the second studio album from the American musical group Retribution Gospel Choir, led by Alan Sparhawk of the band Low. It was released on January 26, 2010, in the US and February 8, 2010, in the UK on the Sub Pop Records label.

== Track listing ==
All songs written by Alan Sparhawk.

No.	Title	Length
1.	"Hide It Away"	3:11
2.	"Your Bird"	2:58
3.	"'68 Comeback"	0:43
4.	"Workin' Hard"	2:20
5.	"Poor Man’s Daughter"	5:49
6.	"White Wolf"	2:48
7.	"The Last of the Blue Dream"	0:27
8.	"Something's Going to Break"	3:02
9.	"Electric Guitar"	8:07
10.	"Bless Us All"	4:23

== Personnel ==
- Alan Sparhawk – vocals, guitar
- Eric Pollard – drums, vocals
- Steve Garrington – bass
