= Lost Verses Live =

Live album by Mark Kozelek
- Released: May 12, 2009
- Recorded: October 2007–November 2008
- Genre: Folk rock
- Length: 73:52
- Language: English
- Label: Caldo Verde Records
- Producer: Mark Kozelek

Mark Kozelek chronology
Find Me, Ruben Olivares: Live in Spain (2009)	Lost Verses Live (2009)	Live at Union Chapel & Södra Teatern (2011)

Professional ratings
Review scores
Source	Rating
Allmusic	(not rated) link
Pitchfork Media	(7.0/10) link
PopMatters	(8/10) link
Stereo Subversion	link

Lost Verses Live is the second of two live albums released in spring 2009 by Mark Kozelek. Lost Verses Live was released on May 12, 2009. A limited edition vinyl pressing includes the exclusive live bonus tracks "I Am a Rock," "Last Tide," and "Floating," and was released in October 2009. The album was recorded live throughout solo tour dates in 2007 and 2008 in intimate, seated settings such as The First Unitarian Church in Philadelphia, Williamsburg Music Hall in Brooklyn, The Palace of Fine Arts in San Francisco and the Aladdin Theatre in Portland. Mark was accompanied by guitarist Phil Carney across the set.

== Track listing ==
No.	Title	Writer(s)	Length
1.	"Unlit Hallway"	Kozelek	4:42
2.	"Carry Me Ohio"	Kozelek	6:12
3.	"Four Fingered Fisherman"	Brock, Judy, Green	3:14
4.	"Moorestown"	Kozelek	5:10
5.	"Salvador Sanchez"	Kozelek	3:40
6.	"Heron Blue"	Kozelek	7:10
7.	"Lost Verses"	Kozelek	7:57
8.	"Tiny Cities Made of Ashes"	Brock, Judy, Green	2:49
9.	"Lucky Man"	Kozelek	6:10
10.	"Send in the Clowns"	Sondheim	3:02
11.	"Harper Road"	Kozelek	4:41
12.	"Tonight in Bilbao"	Kozelek	8:48
13.	"Blue Orchids"	Kozelek	6:01
14.	"Katy Song"	Kozelek	4:21

Vinyl-only bonus tracks
No.	Title	Writer(s)	Length
15.	"I Am a Rock"	Simon
16.	"Last Tide"	Kozelek
17.	"Floating"	Kozelek

== Credits ==
- Mark Kozelek – vocals and guitars
- Phil Carney – guitars
- Recorded live to CD-R at:
  - The First Unitarian Church, Philadelphia – June 15, 2008
  - Williamsburg Music Hall, Brooklyn – November 12, 2008
  - Attuck's Theatre, Norfolk – November 7, 2008
  - Aladdin Theatre, Portland – April 17, 2008
  - The Palace of Fine Arts, San Francisco – April 26, 2008
  - Stenhammarsalen, Gothenburg – October 24, 2007
  - Santiago Alquimista, Lisbon – October 27, 2007
- Mastered by Aaron Prellwitz
- Photography by Nyree Watts
- Design by David Rager
