= Kath Bloom =

American singer-songwriter

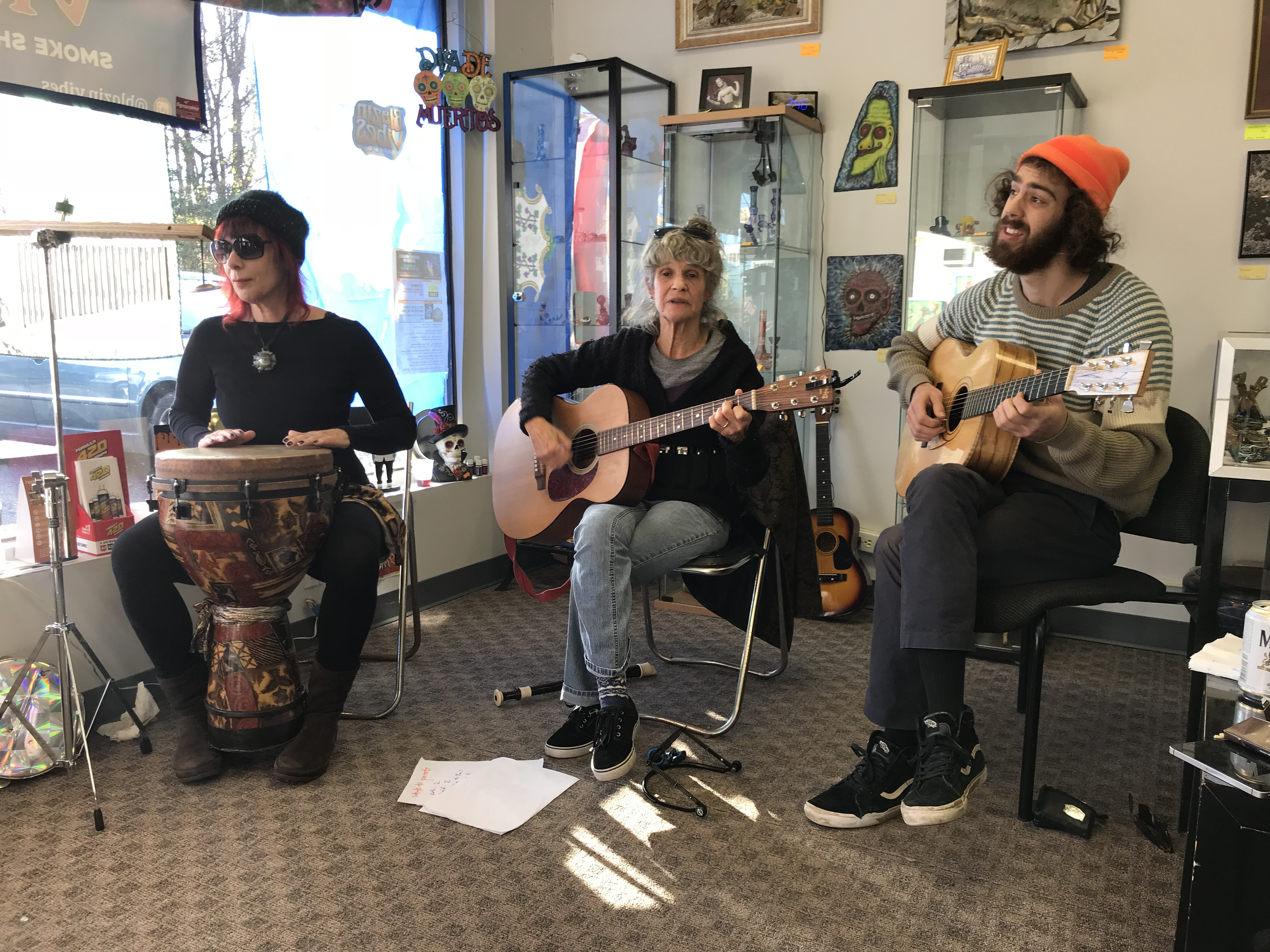

Background information
- Born: Katherine Bloom
- Origin: New Haven, Connecticut, U.S.
- Genres: Folk
- Occupations: Singer-songwriter, musician
- Years active: 1976–1984, 1999–present

Katherine Bloom is an American folk songwriter based in Litchfield, Connecticut.

== Biography ==
The daughter of oboist Robert Bloom, Bloom grew up in New Haven, Connecticut, where she studied the cello as a child and started playing the guitar when she was a teenager.

Bloom collaborated with Bruce Neumann in the early 1970s, and started to record music with avant-garde guitarist Loren MazzaCane Connors in 1976. Bloom and Connors recorded multiple albums of fragile, simple folk and blues melodies, the majority of which were written by Bloom. She cites Robert Johnson and Lightnin' Hopkins as inspiration in this period. Their collaboration ended in 1984 with the release of their final album Moonlight, of which only 300 copies were pressed.

Bloom stopped recording new material soon after her collaboration with Connors ended, and a period of financial hardship followed. A single mother, Bloom focused on raising her children, rarely playing shows outside of New Haven. She began writing songs and recording again in the early 1990s. According to a 2016 interview, Bloom first started touring in 2009, and she enjoys performing now more than she did earlier in her career.

Film director Richard Linklater was introduced to Bloom's music through his friend and fellow director Caveh Zahedi sometime in the early 1990s and featured her song "Come Here" in his 1995 film Before Sunrise. Encouraged by Linklater's interest in her music, Bloom started writing new songs and released her first album in over 10 years, titled Come Here: The Florida Years, in 1999.

A tribute album titled Loving Takes This Course was released in 2009 and features artists such as Devendra Banhart, Bill Callahan, Mark Kozelek, The Dodos, and Scout Niblett.

Presently Bloom trains donkeys and plays with her band Love at Work, which includes longtime collaborator Tom Hanford and husband Stan Bronski, offering musical programs for children and adults as well as playing solo shows in the Northeastern U.S. Bloom has been working with children since 1989. She lives in Litchfield, Connecticut.

== Discography ==
With Loren Mazzacane

- Gifts LP, Daggett Records, 1978
- Fields LP, Daggett Records, 1978
- Hanford, Bloom And Mazzacane LP (with Tom Hanford), Daggett Records, 1981
- Listen to the Blues 7-inch EP (with Tom Hanford), Daggett Records, 1981
- Pushin' Up Daisies 7-inch EP, Daggett Records, 1982
- 'Round His Shoulders Gonna Be A Rainbow LP, Daggett Records, 1982
- Sing the Children Over LP, Ambiguous Records, 1982
- Guitar Pieces cassette, Daggett Records, 1983
- Sand in My Shoe LP, St. Joan Records, 1983
- Restless Faithful Desperate LP, St. Joan Records, 1984
- Moonlight LP, St. Joan Records, 1984

Solo

- Come Here: The Florida Years CD, self-released, 1999
- Terror CD, Chapter Music, 2008
- Thin Thin Line CD, Caldo Verde, 2010
- It's Just a Dream CD, self-released reissue, 1996, 2011
- Here I Am CD, Caldo Verde, 2012
- Somewhere in California CD, Vow Records, 2014
- Pass Through Here CD, Chapter Music, 2015
- This Dream of Life CD, Caldo Verde, 2017
- Bye Bye These Are The Days LP Dear Life Records, 2020

Compilations

- 1981-1984 CD, Megalon Records, 2000
- Finally CD, Chapter Music, 2006
- Sing the Children Over / Sand in My Shoe 2-CD, Chapter Music, 2008
- Restless Faithful Desperate / Moonlight 2-CD, Chapter Music, 2009

Tribute albums

- Loving Takes This Course 2-CD, Chapter Music, 2009
