= Rock 'n' Roll Singer =

EP by Mark Kozelek
- Released: June 13, 2000
- Recorded: San Francisco, California
- Genre: Folk rock
- Length: 28:56
- Language: English
- Label: Badman Recording Co.
- Producer: Mark Kozelek

Mark Kozelek chronology
Rock 'n' Roll Singer (2000)	What's Next to the Moon (2001)

Professional ratings
Review scores
Source	Rating
AllMusic	3/5 stars
Pitchfork	6.1/10

Rock 'n' Roll Singer is the debut solo EP from Mark Kozelek. The EP was released on June 13, 2000, and was released while Kozelek's final album with his previous band Red House Painters (the 1998 album Old Ramon, which didn't get a release until 2001) was in limbo with record label mergers. Rock 'n' Roll Singer contains three original tracks and four covers: "Rock 'n' Roll Singer," "You Ain't Got a Hold on Me," and "Bad Boy Boogie" originally by AC/DC, and "Around and Around" originally by John Denver.

== Track listing ==
1. "Find Me, Rubén Olivares" – 4:00
2. "Rock 'n' Roll Singer" – 4:26
3. "You Ain't Got a Hold on Me" – 3:16
4. "Metropol 47" – 3:15
5. "Around and Around" – 2:25
6. "Bad Boy Boogie" – 5:16
7. "Ruth Marie" – 6:21

=== Notes ===
- Tracks 1, 4, and 7 written by Mark Kozelek.
- Tracks 2, 3, and 6 written by Bon Scott, Angus Young, and Malcolm Young.
- Track 5 written by John Denver.
