= What's Next to the Moon (album) =

Studio album by Mark Kozelek
- Released: January 10, 2001
- Recorded: San Francisco, California
- Genre: Contemporary folk
- Length: 30:21
- Language: English
- Label: Badman Recording Co.
- Producer: Mark Kozelek

Mark Kozelek chronology
Rock 'n' Roll Singer (2000)	What's Next to the Moon (2001)	If You Want Blood (2001)

Professional ratings
Review scores
Source	Rating
Allmusic	4/5 stars
Pitchfork	6.0/10

What's Next to the Moon is a solo album by folk singer-songwriter Mark Kozelek which was released on January 10, 2001. It features ten acoustic covers of Bon Scott-era AC/DC songs, each of which he significantly rearranged. The album followed the release of his debut solo EP Rock 'n' Roll Singer, which also features three AC/DC covers: "Rock 'n' Roll Singer," "You Ain't Got a Hold on Me," and "Bad Boy Boogie." This album's versions of "Rock 'n' Roll Singer" and "Bad Boy Boogie" are distinct from the EP versions.

== Track listing ==
1. "Up to My Neck in You" (from Powerage, 1978) – 2:41
2. "Love at First Feel" (from Love at First Feel, 1976) – 2:15
3. "Love Hungry Man" (from Highway to Hell, 1979) – 1:43
4. "Bad Boy Boogie" (from Let There Be Rock, 1978) – 4:51
5. "What's Next to the Moon" (from Powerage, 1978) – 3:37
6. "Walk All Over You" (from Highway to Hell, 1979) – 3:00
7. "You Ain't Got a Hold on Me" (from High Voltage, 1975) – 3:17
8. "If You Want Blood" (from Highway to Hell, 1979) – 2:40
9. "Riff Raff" (from Powerage, 1978) – 2:50
10. "Rock 'n' Roll Singer" (from T.N.T., 1975) – 3:33

== Notes ==
- All songs written by Bon Scott, Angus Young, and Malcolm Young.
