= Perils from the Sea =

Studio album by Mark Kozelek and Jimmy LaValle
- Released: April 30, 2013
- Genre: Downtempo; folktronica; slowcore
- Length: 77:41
- Language: English
- Label: Caldo Verde Records
- Producer: Jimmy LaValle, Mark Kozelek

Mark Kozelek chronology
Like Rats (2013)	Perils from the Sea (2013)	Mark Kozelek & Desertshore (2013)

Jimmy LaValle chronology
A Chorus of Storytellers (2010)	Perils from the Sea (2013)

Professional ratings
Review scores
Source	Rating
Allmusic	4/5 stars
Pitchfork	(7.3/10)

Perils from the Sea is a collaborative studio album by American singer-songwriter Mark Kozelek and multi-instrumentalist Jimmy LaValle, released on April 30, 2013 on Caldo Verde Records.

== Background and recording ==
On September 11, 2011, Sun Kil Moon's Mark Kozelek asked Jimmy LaValle, of The Album Leaf, to collaborate on a song, resulting in the album's opening track, "What Happened to My Brother". The two continued to work together over the next year, culminating in a finished album, Perils from the Sea.

"You Missed My Heart" previously appeared on Kozelek's 2013 live album Live at Phoenix Public House Melbourne.

== Release ==
Perils from the Sea was originally set to be released under Kozelek and LaValle's monikers, Sun Kil Moon and The Album Leaf, and was released under these monikers in Japan and Taiwan.

"You Missed My Heart" was later covered by Phoebe Bridgers on her 2017 album Stranger in the Alps and a German version was released by Tristan Brusch as a single from his 2023 album Am Wahn.

== Track listing ==
All tracks are written by Mark Kozelek (lyrics), Jimmy LaValle (music).

No.	Title	Length
1.	"What Happened to My Brother"	5:16
2.	"1936"	5:10
3.	"Gustavo"	7:11
4.	"Baby in Death Can I Rest Next to Your Grave"	8:12
5.	"Ceiling Gazing"	8:09
6.	"You Missed My Heart"	5:40
7.	"Caroline"	6:17
8.	"He Always Felt Like Dancing"	7:56
9.	"By the Time That I Awoke"	7:26
10.	"Here Come More Perils from the Sea"	5:52
11.	"Somehow the Wonder of Life Prevails"	10:32

== Personnel ==
=== Musicians ===
- Mark Kozelek – vocals
- Jimmy LaValle – music
- Marcel Gemperli – strings (11)
- Peter Broderick – strings (11)
- Vanessa Ruotolo – strings (11)

=== Recording personnel ===
- Mark Kozelek – producer
- Jimmy LaValle – producer, music recording
- Aaron Prellwitz – vocals recording, mixing
- Gabe Shepard – vocals recording
- Nathan Winter – vocals recording

=== Artwork ===
- Mark Kozelek – photography
- Et Cetera – design
