= Ghosts of the Great Highway =

Studio album by Sun Kil Moon
- Released: November 4, 2003; February 6, 2007 (re-issue)
- Genres: Folk rock; indie folk; Americana
- Length: 58:12
- Language: English
- Labels: Jetset Records; Caldo Verde Records
- Producer: Mark Kozelek

Sun Kil Moon chronology
| Ghosts of the Great Highway (2003) | Tiny Cities (2005) |

Ghosts of the Great Highway is the debut studio album by San Francisco quartet Sun Kil Moon, led by Red House Painters' founder Mark Kozelek, who composed all of the lyrics and music on this album. The other members are Anthony Koutsos (former drummer for Red House Painters), Geoff Stanfield, and Tim Mooney.

Three of the album's songs are named after boxers (Salvador Sanchez, Pancho Villa, Duk Koo Kim) following on from "Find Me, Rubén Olivares" from Kozelek's debut solo EP Rock 'n' Roll Singer. The band name is also derived from the Korean boxer Sung-Kil Moon. The opening track is named after Judas Priest guitarist Glenn Tipton.

Ghosts of the Great Highway was re-issued as a double CD on February 6, 2007 on Kozelek's own label, Caldo Verde Records. The second disc features 6 bonus tracks, including two versions of Leonard Bernstein's "Somewhere", and the instrumental track "Arrival", which was originally recorded for the movie The Girl Next Door. The songs "Carry Me Ohio" and "Lily and Parrots" were featured in the film Shopgirl, in which Kozelek made a cameo appearance.

The song "Carry Me Ohio" was listed at No. 462 on Pitchfork's Top 500 Songs of the 2000s list.

== Reception ==
Professional ratings
Aggregate scores
| Source | Rating |
|---|---|
| Metacritic | 84/100 |
Review scores
| Source | Rating |
| AllMusic | 4/5 stars |
| Blender | 4/5 stars |
| Entertainment Weekly | A− |
| Mojo | 4/5 stars |
| Pitchfork | 8.3/10 (2003); 8.0/10 (2007) |
| Q | 4/5 stars |
| Rolling Stone | 3.5/5 stars |
| Uncut | 4/5 stars |

Upon its release, Ghosts of the Great Highway received critical acclaim. At Metacritic, which assigns a weighted average score out of 100 to reviews and ratings from mainstream critics, the album has received a score of 84, based on 18 reviews, indicating "universal acclaim".

== Track listing ==
All tracks are written by Mark Kozelek, except where noted.

| No. | Title | Length |
|---|---|---|
| 1. | "Glenn Tipton" | 4:16 |
| 2. | "Carry Me Ohio" | 6:21 |
| 3. | "Salvador Sanchez" | 6:29 |
| 4. | "Last Tide" | 2:55 |
| 5. | "Floating" | 3:19 |
| 6. | "Gentle Moon" | 5:18 |
| 7. | "Lily and Parrots" | 4:18 |
| 8. | "Duk Koo Kim" | 14:32 |
| 9. | "Sí, Paloma" | 5:32 |
| 10. | "Pancho Villa" | 5:12 |

Double 12" vinyl bonus track
| No. | Title | Length |
|---|---|---|
| 11. | "Gentle Moon" (Acoustic) | 4:57 |

2007 re-issue bonus disc
| No. | Title | Writer(s) | Length |
|---|---|---|---|
| 1. | "Somewhere" | Leonard Bernstein | 2:13 |
| 2. | "Carry Me Ohio" (Alternate Version) | | 5:24 |
| 3. | "Salvador Sanchez" (Acoustic) | | 4:14 |
| 4. | "The Arrival" | | 2:28 |
| 5. | "Somewhere" (Version 2) | Bernstein | 2:15 |
| 6. | "Gentle Moon" (Live Radio Recording) | | 4:41 |

== Singles ==
- "Duk Koo Kim" (Mark Kozelek solo) (September 15, 2003)
  - Limited edition 10" vinyl single (limited to 2,000 copies worldwide), features acoustic studio version and live version.
