= BeatRoute =

Canadian print and online magazine

BeatRoute Magazine
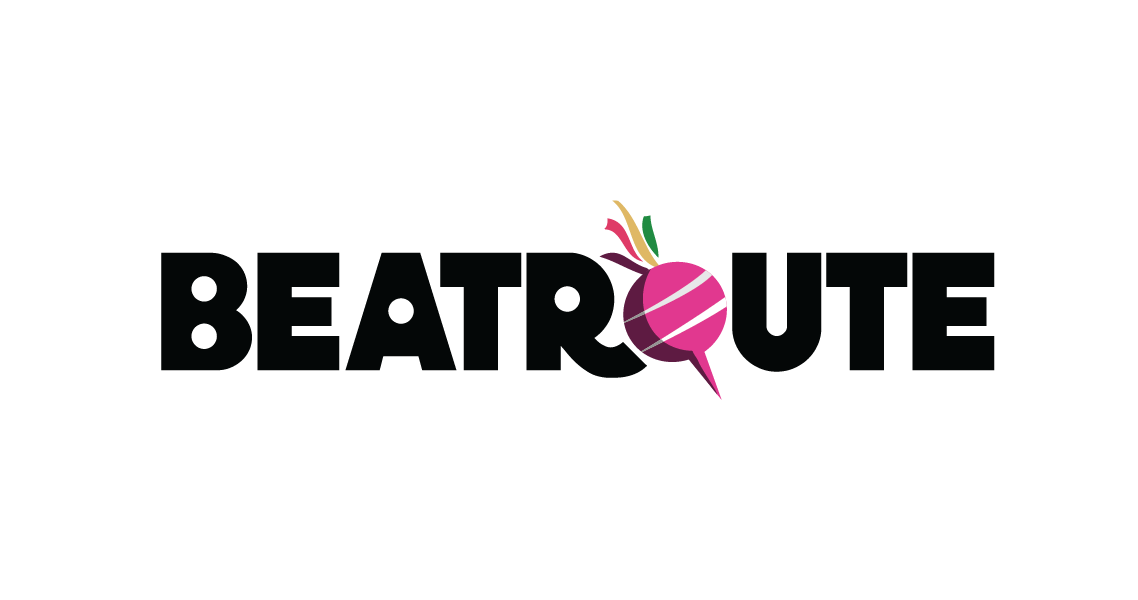
- Founder: Brad Simm and Glenn Alderson
- Founded: 2004
- Language: English
- Website: beatroutemedia.com

BeatRoute is a monthly print and online magazine published in Western Canada. The magazine is distributed across Alberta and British Columbia, with offices in Calgary and Vancouver. BeatRoute is a primarily music-oriented publication, with a circulation of more than 10,000.

== History ==
BeatRoute was founded by Brad Simm and Glenn Alderson in 2004. Simm also works in the journalism program at Mount Royal University.

In 2009, BeatRoute began producing a West Coast edition, with an additional 10,000 copies distributed in Vancouver, Victoria and Nanaimo. BeatRoute's British Columbia office has presented and sponsored a multitude of events in Vancouver, including celebrations surrounding the 2018 Juno Awards.

== Content ==
BeatRoute's initial target readership began as a younger age group, but has since expanded. Although primarily focused on music, BeatRoute also publishes articles on art, culture, and film reviews. On occasion, BeatRoute articles have been picked up by larger publications following major concert coverage in Western Canada. In 2018, for example, BeatRoute's feature interview with Arctic Monkeys was cited in multiple international publications including NME and iHeartRadio.
