= April (Sun Kil Moon album) =

Studio album by Sun Kil Moon
- Released: April 1, 2008
- Recorded: March – August 2007, San Francisco, California
- Genre: Folk rock
- Length: 73:44
- Language: English
- Label: Caldo Verde Records
- Producer: Mark Kozelek

Sun Kil Moon chronology
Tiny Cities (2005)	April (2008)	Admiral Fell Promises (2010)

Professional ratings
Aggregate scores
Source	Rating
Metacritic	80/100
Review scores
Source	Rating
AllMusic	4.5/5 stars
The A.V. Club	A−
Metromix	4/5 stars
Mojo	4/5 stars
Pitchfork	8.3/10
Rolling Stone	3/5 stars
Slant Magazine	4/5 stars
Spin	3/5 stars
The Sunday Times	5/5 stars
Uncut	4/5 stars

April is the third studio album by American folk rock band Sun Kil Moon, released in the US on April 1, 2008, through Caldo Verde Records, and on April 18, 2008, in Japan via P-Vine Records. The album was recorded at Hyde Street Studios in San Francisco and Well Recording in Seattle during a seven-month stretch from spring to late summer in 2007. The album was produced and written by Mark Kozelek. Will Oldham, Ben Gibbard and Eric Pollard lend their backing vocals throughout the album. The album also comes with a bonus disc of four alternate recordings.

April is also available on vinyl through Caldo Verde Records, Vinyl Films, and Aural Exploits. A limited pressing of 1,000 copies on black vinyl were released on May 6, 2008, to retail and online outlets; 500 on white vinyl from May 20, 2008, exclusively at sunkilmoon.com; and 400 on marble vinyl, exclusive to Aural Exploits, from June 3, 2008. The four bonus tracks (plus two previously unreleased live versions of "Lucky Man" and "Tonight in Bilbao") were released separately as a vinyl EP, titled Tonight the Sky, available exclusively on Caldo Verde Records' website in January 2009.

The songs "Moorestown" and "Unlit Hallway" first appeared on Mark Kozelek's 2006 live double album Little Drummer Boy Live. At the time of the album's release, the two songs were previously unreleased. The song "Lucky Man" refers to the Emerson, Lake & Palmer song of the same name from the band's 1970 debut self-titled album. "Heron Blue" is featured in the Gears of War 3 teaser trailer which premiered in April 2010.

April debuted in the Billboard Top 200 at No. 127. By its second week, the album remained in the chart at No. 200. The album was released to positive reviews, with Slant Magazine asking the question: "How many other artists can boast as many near-masterpieces?"

== Track listing ==
All tracks written by Mark Kozelek.

No.	Title	Length
1.	"Lost Verses"	9:43
2.	"The Light"	7:50
3.	"Lucky Man"	5:47
4.	"Unlit Hallway"	4:19
5.	"Heron Blue"	7:38
6.	"Moorestown"	4:41
7.	"Harper Road"	3:56
8.	"Tonight the Sky"	10:21
9.	"Like the River"	4:09
10.	"Tonight in Bilbao"	9:28
11.	"Blue Orchids"	5:56
Total length:		73:44

=== Bonus disc ===
1. "Tonight in Bilbao" (alternate version) – 9:43
2. "The Light" (alternate version) – 6:02
3. "Like the River" (alternate version) – 3:03
4. "Tonight the Sky" (alternate version) – 7:36

== Tonight the Sky (EP) ==
The bonus disc was released as a separate 12" vinyl EP in January 2009 by Caldo Verde Records and Vinyl Films. The vinyl release also features two previously unreleased live tracks.

Side A

1. "Tonight in Bilbao" (alternate version) – 9:43
2. "The Light" (alternate version) – 6:02
3. "Like the River" (alternate version) – 3:03

Side B

1. "Tonight the Sky" (alternate version) – 7:36
2. "Tonight in Bilbao" (live in Barcelona) – 9:04
3. "Lucky Man" (live in Glasgow) – 5:34

== Personnel ==
=== Sun Kil Moon ===
- Mark Kozelek – vocals, guitar
- Anthony Koutsos – drums
- Geoff Stanfield – bass guitar

=== Additional musicians ===
- Michi Aceret – viola
- David Revelli – percussion
- Will Oldham – additional vocals
- Ben Gibbard – additional vocals
- Eric Pollard – additional vocals

=== Recording personnel ===
- Mark Kozelek – producer
- Aaron Prellwitz – engineer
- Geoff Stanfield – engineer
- Jason McGerr – engineer
- Steve Armstrong – additional engineering
- HT Waterman – additional engineering
- John Golden – mastering

=== Artwork ===
- Nyree Watts – photographs
- David Rager – design
