= Stephen Deusner =

American music critic

Stephen M. Deusner is an American music critic and part-time record store clerk who lives in Bloomington, Indiana. A native of Tennessee, he has contributed to Pitchfork Media (including the Pitchfork 500), Salon, CMT, American Songwriter, Paste, eMusic, and the Village Voice, among other publications. He has also contributed an essay about Okkervil River and unreliable narrators to the 2011 book The Poetics of American Song Lyrics, published by the University Press of Mississippi.
