= Mark Kozelek =

American singer (born 1967)

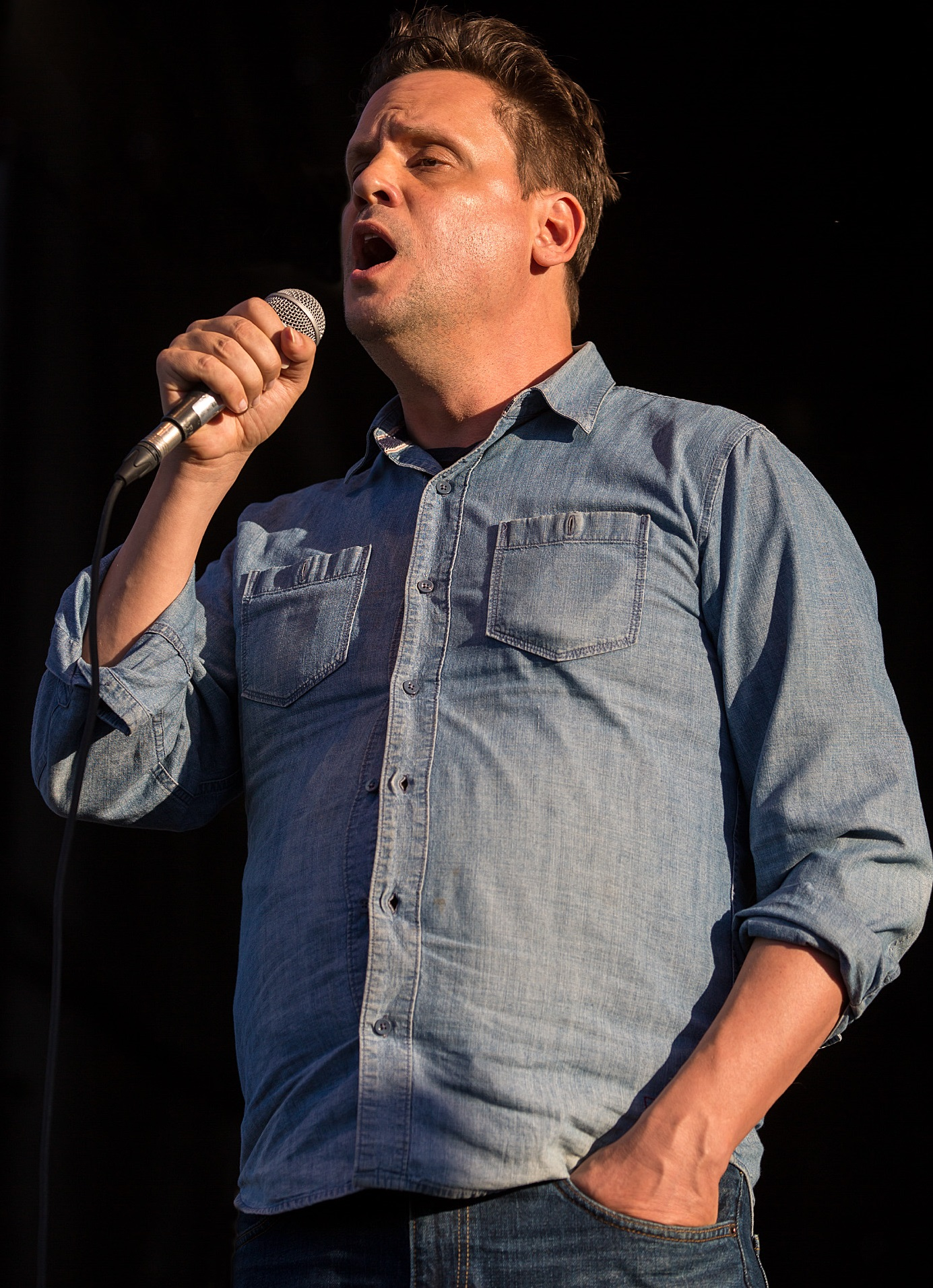
- Kozelek performing with Sun Kil Moon in 2014

Background information
- Born: Mark Edward Kozelek; January 24, 1967 (age 59); Massillon, Ohio, United States
- Genres: Folk rock; slowcore; alt country; indie rock; spoken word; experimental
- Occupations: Singer-songwriter; musician; record producer; record label owner
- Instruments: Vocals; guitar; bass; piano
- Years active: 1989–present
- Label: Caldo Verde
- Member of: Sun Kil Moon
- Formerly of: Red House Painters; God Forbid
- Website: www.sunkilmoon.com

Mark Edward Kozelek (born January 24, 1967) is an American singer, songwriter, guitarist, record producer and occasional actor. He is known as the vocalist and primary recording artist of the indie folk act Sun Kil Moon and founding member of the indie rock band Red House Painters, with whom he recorded six studio albums from 1988 until 2001.

In 1996, Kozelek recorded the band's fifth studio album, Songs for a Blue Guitar, mostly alone. The release of the band's final studio album, Old Ramon (2001), was delayed for three years. In the interim, Kozelek recorded both an album and an EP of AC/DC cover songs.

Reconvening with Koutsos and Vessel, the trio continued performing under the new name of Sun Kil Moon, releasing their debut album, Ghosts of the Great Highway, in 2003. Inspired by classical guitar music, Kozelek recorded Sun Kil Moon's fourth studio album, Admiral Fell Promises (2010), as a solo act and continued to record mostly alone on its follow-up, Among the Leaves (2012), and later Perils from the Sea and Mark Kozelek & Desertshore, both released in 2013.

In 2014, Sun Kil Moon's sixth studio album, Benji, was released to widespread critical acclaim and increased exposure with its follow-up, Universal Themes, featuring lengthy compositions and stream-of-consciousness lyrics. In 2016, Kozelek released a collaborative studio album with Jesu, titled Jesu/Sun Kil Moon.

Across his work in Sun Kil Moon, Red House Painters, and his own solo material, Kozelek has released thirty-one studio albums, with his most recent being Murals (2026). A number of commentators have described him as one of the greatest songwriters of all time.

== Career ==
Kozelek was born on January 24, 1967 and raised in Massillon, Ohio. In his teenage years, he led a band named God Forbid. Upon relocating to Atlanta, Georgia, he met drummer Anthony Koutsos. After the pair moved once again to San Francisco, California, Red House Painters formed with the addition of guitarist Gorden Mack and bassist Jerry Vessel. From 1992 to 1996, Red House Painters released a series of acclaimed albums, showcasing Kozelek's intense, highly autobiographical songs.

However, Kozelek's parting with the record label 4AD, followed by a major label merger which left Red House Painters' 1998 album Old Ramon on the shelf, proved highly frustrating and stifled the group's momentum.

In 2000, he released the solo EP Rock 'n' Roll Singer, which featured three original songs as well as covers of John Denver's "Around and Around" and three AC/DC songs ("Rock 'n' Roll Singer," "Bad Boy Boogie," and "You Ain't Got a Hold on Me"). Two of the AC/DC cover versions on Rock 'n' Roll Singer were radical re-arrangements of the originals which removed the Bon Scott-penned lyrics from their hard rock context and placed them into gentle, acoustic "folk ballad" settings.

Kozelek expanded on this idea in 2001, releasing a full-length album composed solely of AC/DC covers titled What's Next to the Moon.

Sun Kil Moon debuted with Ghosts of the Great Highway in 2003, and also features former RHP members Jerry Vessel and Anthony Koutsos as well as new collaborators Geoff Stanfield (formerly of Black Lab) and Tim Mooney of American Music Club. Their follow-up effort appeared in 2005 on Kozelek's newly formed label, Caldo Verde Records. Titled Tiny Cities, the album is made up entirely of covers of songs by Modest Mouse. Once again, Kozelek's cover versions varied greatly from the originals. In a February 2014 interview with Seattle's The Stranger, Kozelek commented that he's "never heard from Modest Mouse" as to what they think of the record.

In 2006, Kozelek was invited by Toronto indie rock label Paper Bag Records to exclusively contribute to their See You on the Moon! Songs for Kids of All Ages compilation with his original song "Leo and Luna." Then in November 2006, Kozelek released a live album titled Little Drummer Boy Live.

Kozelek returned in 2008 with the release of Sun Kil Moon's third album April. The album features 11 brand new recordings, including guest vocal contributions by Ben Gibbard, Will Oldham and Eric Pollard.

The release of the new album also brought the re-issue of Nights of Passed Over, a 256-page, hard-cover book of all the lyrics to Kozelek's solo songs, Red House Painters' songs, and Sun Kil Moon's songs. It also features setlists, handwritten lyrics, and a preface by Kozelek himself. The original edition of this book was released in 2002 in Portugal, and featured all the lyrics up to that point, printed in both English and Portuguese. The updated edition spans to his current Sun Kil Moon days, and the book also includes a 12-track bonus CD titled Nights LP, featuring live and rare versions of songs dated 1996 to 2007. The edition is sold exclusively on his label's website and is limited to 2,500 copies.

On December 9, 2008, Kozelek and Caldo Verde Records issued The Finally LP, a CD collection of 10 unreleased tracks, including covers of songs by Stephen Sondheim, Will Oldham, Hüsker Dü, and Low among others, as well as two previously unreleased instrumentals. Two newly recorded live albums, Find Me, Ruben Olivares: Live in Spain and Lost Verses Live, followed in spring 2009.

On April 23, 2010, the release of Sun Kil Moon's fourth album, Admiral Fell Promises, was announced. The album was released on July 13, 2010.

A documentary film titled Mark Kozelek: On Tour was released via Caldo Verde Records on August 16, 2011. The movie was filmed during portions Mark Kozelek's European/North American tours of 2010 and early 2011.

Sun Kil Moon's fifth album, Among the Leaves, was released on Caldo Verde Records on May 29, 2012.

Kozelek also contributed as a vocalist and bass player to Desertshore, a group featuring Red House Painters guitarist Phil Carney, classically trained pianist Chris Connolly, and more recently Sun Kil Moon drummer Mike Stevens. His first collaboration with Desertshore came on the group's second studio album, Drawing Of Threes (released November 22, 2011, Caldo Verde Records). Kozelek appeared in 6 out of 10 tracks as a vocalist and bass player. He played a more major role in the third studio album titled Mark Kozelek & Desertshore (released August 20, 2013, Caldo Verde Records), where he is featured as vocalist and bassist on all 10 tracks. In the same year, Kozelek released Perils From the Sea, a collaboration album with multi-instrumentalist Jimmy LaValle of The Album Leaf, and covers album Like Rats.

In 2014, Sun Kil Moon released Benji to wide acclaim, garnering a score of 85 from the critical rating aggregate website, Metacritic. No Ripcord calls it Kozelek's "most intimate work yet" and Kitty Empire of Observer added, it "might well be this difficult artist's most direct work." Soundblab rated it the best album of 2014, stating "When I remember 2014 in music, there will be Sun Kil Moon's Benji and there will be everything else." Several publications praised Kozelek's songwriting skills and highlighted Benji as his best work to date.

Sun Kil Moon's sixth album of original material, Universal Themes, was released on June 2, 2015. The album again featured drummer Steve Shelley, who previously played drums on Benji and then released an album in 2017 Common as Light and Love Are Red Valleys of Blood. Kozelek toured Europe, the United States, and South America in support of the album in 2017 and 2018. On May 11, 2018, Kozelek released an eponymously titled double CD album, which "was recorded in San Francisco hotels and studios between May 2017 and January 2018."

In August 2022, he announced two concerts in Hungary and Slovenia after an almost two-year absence from live performance.

== Acting ==
Kozelek has also dabbled in acting. Friend and director Cameron Crowe cast him in his film Almost Famous (2000) as Larry Fellows (the bass player in Stillwater) and in Vanilla Sky (2001) as a clubgoer who mocks Tom Cruise's character. In 2005, he appeared in Steve Martin's film Shopgirl, playing a musician who befriends and mentors Jason Schwartzman's character. Kozelek also performed "Lily and Parrots" (a Sun Kil Moon song) live in the film.

Kozelek appears as himself, and contributed to the soundtrack to Paolo Sorrentino's 2015 film, Youth.

== Controversies ==
=== Hopscotch Music Festival ===
On September 5, 2014, during a Sun Kil Moon performance at Hopscotch Music Festival in Raleigh, North Carolina, Kozelek called the noisy crowd "fucking hillbillies" and told them to "shut the fuck up" or else he would leave. He traded insults with the crowd before saying that his previous comments were meant as a joke. Allison Hussey of Indy Week first reported the incident, and linked to audio of Kozelek berating the audience. On September 9, 2014, Kozelek's label Caldo Verde began selling t-shirts with "All You Fuckin' Hillbillies Shut The Fuck Up" printed on the front.

=== The War on Drugs ===
On September 14, 2014, Sun Kil Moon performed at the Ottawa Folk Festival in Ottawa, Canada, and their set overlapped with that of American rock band The War on Drugs. Kozelek complained of noise from The War on Drugs' set bleeding over to his stage and told the audience, "I hate that beer commercial lead-guitar shit". He introduced his next song as being titled "The War on Drugs Can Suck My Fucking Dick".

On September 17, 2014, Kozelek wrote a statement on the Sun Kil Moon website which Pitchfork later reported on September 29, 2014, as being an apology to The War on Drugs. On September 30, 2014, Kozelek made another post in response to Pitchfork and Stereogum in which he clarified that his statement had in fact not been an apology to the band, saying that he does not "apologize for stage banter". He also challenged the band to let him join them onstage at their upcoming concert on October 6, 2014, at The Fillmore to play a "hilarious song" Kozelek wrote entitled "War On Drugs: Suck My Cock/Sun Kil Moon: Go Fuck Yourself". On October 6, 2014, Sun Kil Moon released "War on Drugs: Suck My Cock", a seven-minute "diss track" targeting The War on Drugs and featuring commentary about the Hopscotch and Ottawa festival incidents. In the song Kozelek also targeted Indy Week journalist Allison Hussey, calling her "some spoiled bitch rich kid blogger brat".

On October 28, 2014, War on Drugs frontman Adam Granduciel revealed in an interview that he was contacted privately by Kozelek to join them at The Fillmore before Kozelek posted the challenge online to the public, but that Kozelek responded that "the offer has expired" before Granduciel had time to respond. On October 30, 2014, Sun Kil Moon released a second diss track entitled "Adam Granofsky Blues", a spoken word track featuring Kozelek mockingly reciting Granduciel's comments.

=== Sexual misconduct allegations ===
In August 2020, in an article published by Pitchfork, Kozelek was alleged to have engaged in sexual misconduct with a woman named Sarah Golden, as well as two other unidentified women. On August 17, Kozelek denied the allegations against him and stated that he had retained a law firm to "investigate and pursue as necessary any claims against anyone participating to defame me".

On March 25, 2021, Pitchfork published another article on seven more women who accused Kozelek of sexual misconduct. Several of these women alleged that, in separate incidents, Kozelek brought them back to a hotel room, promising them that the encounter would not be sexual, before later emerging from the bathroom unclothed or in underwear and then masturbating. He then allegedly groped some of these women despite repeated requests to stop, then repeatedly pressured them to have sexual intercourse with him until they either left or had sex with him. Pitchfork reported that Kozelek denied the allegations in a letter issued to them by his attorney.

In May 2026, the Seahorse Tavern in Halifax, Nova Scotia cancelled a Sun Kil Moon concert set to happen on September 15, 2026 after receiving backlash to booking Kozelek due to the allegations of sexual misconduct against him.

== Discography ==
Solo albums

- What's Next to the Moon (2001)
- Like Rats (2013)
- Perils from the Sea (2013) (with Jimmy LaValle)
- Mark Kozelek & Desertshore (2013) (with Desertshore)
- Mark Kozelek Sings Christmas Carols (2014)
- Dreams of Childhood (2015) (with Nicolás Pauls)
- Mark Kozelek Sings Favorites (2016)
- Yellow Kitchen (2017) (with Sean Yeaton)
- Mark Kozelek with Ben Boye and Jim White (2017) (with Ben Boye and Jim White)
- Mark Kozelek (2018)
- Joey Always Smiled (2019) (with Petra Haden)
- Mark Kozelek with Ben Boye and Jim White 2 (2020) (with Ben Boye and Jim White)
- All the Best, Isaac Hayes (2020)

EPs

- Rock 'n' Roll Singer (2000)
- Down in the Willow Garden (2015)
- Night Talks (2017)
- Lovin‘ You (2021)

Compilations

- If You Want Blood (2001)
- Nights LP (2008)
- The Finally LP (2008)

Live albums

- White Christmas Live (2001)
- Little Drummer Boy Live (2006)
- White Christmas and Little Drummer Boy Live (2007)
- 7 Songs Belfast (2008)
- Find Me, Ruben Olivares: Live in Spain (2009)
- Lost Verses Live (2009)
- Live at Union Chapel & Södra Teatern (2011)
- Live at Lincoln Hall (2012)
- On Tour: A Documentary – The Soundtrack (2012)
- Live in Copenhagen (2012)
- Live at Phoenix Public House Melbourne (2013)
- Live at Mao Livehouse Shanghai & Beijing (2013)
- Live at Palladium: Malmö (2013)
- Live at Victoria Teatern and Stenhammarsalen (2014)
- Live at Biko (2014)
- The Kids – Live in London (2014)
