= Sun Kil Moon =

American folk rock act

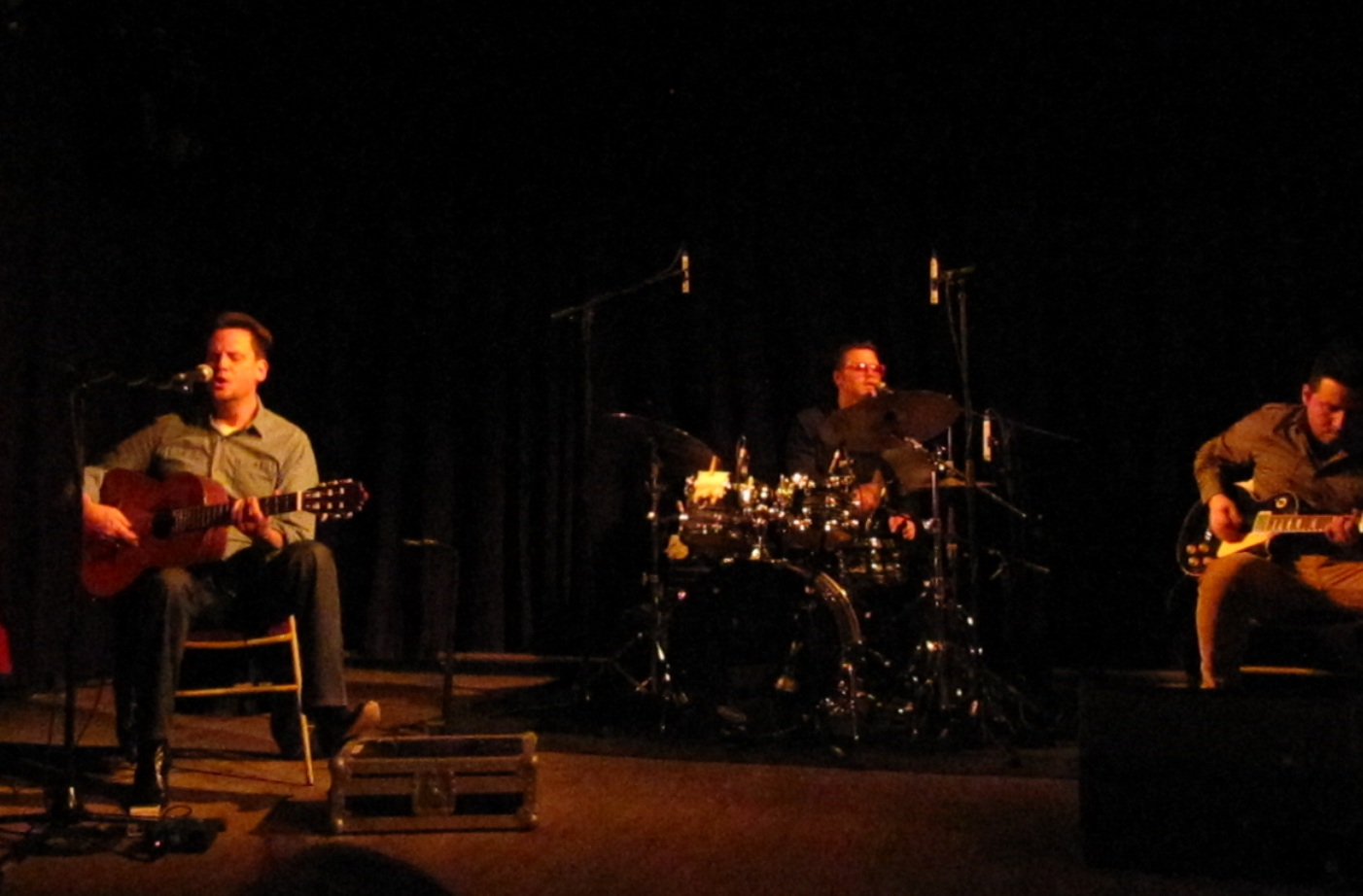
- Sun Kil Moon performing at Le Divan du Monde, (Mark Kozelek, Eric Pollard, Vasco Espinheira) Paris 2014

Background information
- Origin: San Francisco, California, U.S.
- Genres: Folk rock; indie folk; slowcore; alternative rock; spoken word
- Years active: 2002–present
- Label: Caldo Verde
- Spinoff of: Red House Painters
- Members: Mark Kozelek
- Past members: Tim Mooney; Anthony Koutsos; Geoff Stanfield; Vasco Espinheira; Jerry Vessel; Phil Carney; Matt Boyer; Eric Pollard; Isabel Castelvi
- Website: www.sunkilmoon.com

Sun Kil Moon in Calgary, Alberta on September 2, 2026 at Commonwealth Bar & Stage.

Sun Kil Moon is an American folk rock act from San Francisco, California, founded in 2002. Initially a continuation of the defunct indie rock band Red House Painters, Sun Kil Moon is now the primary recording moniker of vocalist and guitarist Mark Kozelek. The project is named after the Korean boxer Sung-Kil Moon.

Following the delayed release of Red House Painters' final studio album, Old Ramon (2001), vocalist and guitarist Kozelek began recording new material under the name Sun Kil Moon with bandmates Anthony Koutsos (drums) and Jerry Vessel (bass), alongside Geoff Stanfield and Tim Mooney. The resulting album, Ghosts of the Great Highway, was released in 2003 to critical acclaim. The project's second studio album, Tiny Cities (2005), was composed entirely of Modest Mouse cover songs.

In 2008, the band released its third studio album, April. Recorded as a three-piece by Kozelek, Koutsos and Stanfield, the album was well received and featured guest vocal appearances from noted indie rock musicians Will Oldham and Ben Gibbard.

Inspired by classical guitar music, Kozelek recorded Sun Kil Moon's fourth studio album, Admiral Fell Promises (2010), as a solo act, and continued to record mostly alone on its follow-up, Among the Leaves (2012). In 2013, Kozelek released three studio albums under his own name before releasing Sun Kil Moon's sixth studio album, Benji, in February 2014, to widespread critical acclaim and increased exposure, with the band releasing their seventh studio effort, Universal Themes, in 2015. Sun Kil Moon's eighth studio album, Common as Light and Love Are Red Valleys of Blood, was released in February 2017, which was followed by their ninth studio album, This Is My Dinner, in November 2018. The tenth Sun Kil Moon studio album, I Also Want to Die in New Orleans, was released in March 2019.

== History ==
Following the dissolution of Red House Painters after the tumultuous release of their last album, Old Ramon, Kozelek released a handful of solo recordings before forming Sun Kil Moon in 2002. The initial Sun Kil Moon consisted of Kozelek with former Red House Painters bandmates Anthony Koutsos and Jerry Vessel, as well as bassist Geoff Stanfield of Black Lab and drummer Tim Mooney.

The band's debut album, Ghosts of the Great Highway, was released in November 2003 by Jetset Records. It contains several songs concerned with true-life stories of deceased boxers, such as Mexican featherweight champion Salvador Sánchez, Filipino flyweight champion Pancho Villa, and also Korean boxer Duk Koo Kim. The album was well received by critics, garnering an overall rating of 84/100 on Metacritic.com.

The band's follow-up Tiny Cities was released in November 2005 on Kozelek's own label Caldo Verde Records. The album covers eleven songs by the indie/alternative group Modest Mouse. Ghosts of the Great Highway was re-issued as a double CD in February 2007 on Caldo Verde. The second disc features six bonus tracks, including a cover of "Somewhere" written by Leonard Bernstein.

Sun Kil Moon's third studio album April was released in April 1, 2008 and features guest vocals from Will Oldham and Ben Gibbard. The album was issued as a double CD, featuring a bonus disc of alternate recordings of album tracks. The album was met with further critical acclaim, including a 4.5/5-star rating from AllMusic and 4-star reviews from Billboard, Mojo, The Boston Globe, and Drowned in Sound.

Admiral Fell Promises was released on July 13, 2010, and whilst credited to Sun Kil Moon, only Kozelek plays on the record, on nylon stringed guitar, and vocals.

Among The Leaves, Sun Kil Moon's fifth studio album, was released on May 29, 2012. Tim Mooney, the band's former drummer, died in June 2012.

Sun Kil Moon's sixth studio album, Benji, was released in February 2014. The record met with critical acclaim, and was named in the Best of 2014 lists of Fact, Stereogum, Pitchfork, Rough Trade, Drowned in Sound, Tiny Mix Tapes, and the NME. Soundblab selected it as the best album of 2014.

Sun Kil Moon's seventh album of original material, Universal Themes, was released on June 2, 2015. The album features contributions from drummer Steve Shelley, who previously collaborated with Kozelek on the album, Benji.

On July 20, 2016 it was announced that Sun Kil Moon would release a new double album, Common as Light and Love Are Red Valleys of Blood on February 17, 2017. The announcement was accompanied by the release of a new song, God Bless Ohio. The album was released on February 17, 2017 with Caldo Verde Records. Mark Kozelek subsequently toured Europe, South America, and the United States, both as a solo act and with Sun Kil Moon, to promote the album.

On November 1, 2018, Sun Kil Moon released their ninth studio album, This Is My Dinner. The following year, their tenth studio album was released, titled I Also Want to Die in New Orleans, named after the $uicideboy$ album I Want to Die in New Orleans. This album saw Kozelek working with Donny McCaslin and Jim White, the former being heavily present on David Bowie's 2016 album, Blackstar.

== Boxing references ==
Kozelek's favorite sport is boxing, and the name Sun Kil Moon was inspired by that of boxer Moon Sung-kil. Kozelek discussed boxing and the murder of Agapito Sánchez four years after a fight he witnessed in a 2012 interview:

Their backgrounds are extremely harsh and they work very hard to move up in their careers. I was in attendance at the Manny Pacquiao-Agapito Sánchez fight in San Francisco in 2001. When I heard Sánchez was murdered shortly after, it had a profound effect on me. It hurts when anyone dies young, but when you see the backgrounds of these guys and the path they've taken to try to find some light in their lives, it hurts to see them die young.

Several of the band's songs are inspired by the sport, such as "Duk Koo Kim". Duk Koo Kim was a Korean boxer who died after a nationally televised bout with Ray Mancini on November 13, 1982. Mancini is from Youngstown, Ohio, which is approximately 70 miles from Kozelek's hometown of Massillon. The triumph of the local hero soon turned into a tragedy that included the suicide deaths of both Kim's mother and the bout's referee, Richard Green. The song "Pancho Villa" is named after the Filipino boxer known by that name, and also mentions Salvador Sánchez and Benny Paret.

== Band members ==
During live performances, Mark Kozelek is currently accompanied by:

- Nick Zubeck – electric guitar, six-string bass (2014–present)
- Chris Connolly – keyboards (2014–present)
- Mike Stevens – drums (2015–present)
- Ben Boye – keyboards (2016–present)
- Ramon Fermin – classical and electric guitar (2017–present)
- Steve Shelley – drums (2015–present; occasional performances)
- Neil Halstead – electric guitar (2015; occasional performances)

Former members

- Eric Pollard – drums (2014)
- Vasco Espinheira – guitar (2014)
- Isabel Castelvi – cello (2014)
- Matt Boyer – guitar
- Phil Carney – guitar
- Anthony Koutsos – drums
- Tim Mooney – drums
- Geoff Stanfield – bass guitar
- Jerry Vessel – bass guitar

== Discography ==
Studio albums

- Ghosts of the Great Highway (2003)
- Tiny Cities (2005)
- April (2008)
- Admiral Fell Promises (2010)
- Among the Leaves (2012)
- Benji (2014)
- Universal Themes (2015)
- Common as Light and Love Are Red Valleys of Blood (2017)
- This Is My Dinner (2018)
- I Also Want to Die in New Orleans (2019)
- Welcome to Sparks, Nevada (2020)
- Lunch in the Park (2021)
- Quiet Beach House Nights (2023)
- All the Artists (2025)

EPs

- Tonight The Sky (2009)
- I'll Be There (2010)
- Birthday Girl (2024)
- One Day In May (2024)
- Murals (2026)

Collaborations

- Perils from the Sea (2013) (with The Album Leaf) (Note: Only credited under the names Sun Kil Moon and The Album Leaf in Japan and Taiwan, elsewhere it was credited as a collaboration between Mark Kozelek and Jimmy Lavelle.)
- Jesu/Sun Kil Moon (2016)
- 30 Seconds to the Decline of Planet Earth (2017)
- Sun Kil Moon and Amoeba (2024)
- Sun Kil Moon and Amoeba, Vol. II (2025)

== Soundtracks / songs in films or television ==
- "Kentucky Woman" (in Elizabethtown)
- "The Arrival" (in The Girl Next Door)
- "Carry Me Ohio" and "Lily and Parrots" (in Shopgirl and The Elephant in the Living Room)
- "Gentle Moon" (in Friday Night Lights)
- "Heron Blue" (in Crash season 1, episode "F-36, Sprint Left, T-4" during closing credits, in I Am Zozo and in Gears of War 3 "Ashes to Ashes" trailer and The Elephant in the Living Room)
- "Lost Verses" (in Californication season 2, episode 12: "La petite mort")
- "Like the River" (in Sons of Anarchy season 1: pilot)
- "Tonight the Sky" (in Brothers & Sisters season 3) and The Elephant in the Living Room )
- "Ålesund" (in Sons of Anarchy season 3, episode 11: Bainne)
- "Glenn Tipton" (in Sons of Anarchy season 4, episode 12: Burnt and Purged Away)
- "Third and Seneca" (in Sons Of Anarchy season 5, episode 3: Laying Pipe)
- "Among The Leaves" (in The Big C season 4, episode 2: Hereafter: You Can't Take It With You)
- "Onward" (in Youth)
- "Third & Seneca" (in Youth)
- "That Bird Has A Broken Wing" (in Rectify season 2, episode 2: "Sleeping Giants")
- "Heron Blue" (in Tin Star season 2, episode 6: The Bagman Cometh)
