= Caldo Verde Records =

American record company

- Founded: 2005
- Founder: Mark Kozelek
- Genre: Indie rock, folk rock, sadcore
- Country of origin: United States
- Location: San Francisco, California
- Official website: caldoverderecords.com

Caldo Verde Records is a San Francisco–based indie rock and folk record label founded by Red House Painters and Sun Kil Moon frontman Mark Kozelek in 2005. The label primarily features releases by Kozelek and Sun Kil Moon, but has also released albums by Jesu, Corrina Repp, Retribution Gospel Choir, and Kath Bloom. Photographer Nyree Watts is the commissioned artist for Caldo Verde, as almost all of the releases on the label feature her photography.

== Roster ==
- Mark Kozelek
- Sun Kil Moon
- Jesu
- Corrina Repp (one album release)
- Retribution Gospel Choir (one album release)
- Kath Bloom (one album release)
- Desertshore (Phil Carney and Chris Connolly)
- Heirlooms of August (Jerry Vessel, former bassist for Red House Painters)
- Lisa Cerbone (one album release)

== Discography ==
- CV001: Tiny Cities, Sun Kil Moon (November 1, 2005)
- CV002: The Absent and the Distant, Corrina Repp (September 19, 2006)
- CV003: Little Drummer Boy Live, Mark Kozelek (November 28, 2006)
- CV004: Ghosts of the Great Highway (2CD reissue), Sun Kil Moon (February 6, 2007)
- CV005: Retribution Gospel Choir, Retribution Gospel Choir (March 18, 2008)
- CV006: April, Sun Kil Moon (April 1, 2008)
- CV007: Nights LP (and Nights of Passed Over book), Mark Kozelek (April 1, 2008) (back cover lists catalog number also as CV007)
- CV007: The Finally LP, Mark Kozelek (December 9, 2008)
- CV008: Lost Verses Live, Mark Kozelek (May 12, 2009)
- CV009: Opiate Sun EP, Jesu (October 27, 2009)
- CV010: Thin Thin Line, Kath Bloom (February 9, 2010)
- CV011: Admiral Fell Promises, Sun Kil Moon (July 13, 2010)
- CV012: Drifting Your Majesty, Desertshore (October 19, 2010)
- CV013: Ascension, Jesu (May 10, 2011)
- CV014: Forever the Moon, Heirlooms of August (June 21, 2011)

=== Other releases ===
- CVPRO1: 7 Songs Belfast EP, Mark Kozelek (free CD given away with purchases from Caldo Verde's website) (July 1, 2008)
- VFR-2008-2 (Caldo Verde/Vinyl Films): Tonight the Sky EP, Sun Kil Moon (January 6, 2009) (vinyl-only release)
- CVPRO2: Find Me, Ruben Olivares: Live in Spain, Mark Kozelek (free CD given away with purchases from Caldo Verde's website) (April 1, 2009)
- VFR-2009-1: The Finally LP double vinyl release, Mark Kozelek (December 2009)
- VFR 2009-2: Lost Verses Live double vinyl release, Mark Kozelek (December 2009)
- CVPRO3: I'll Be There EP, Sun Kil Moon (limited edition EP included with Admiral Fell Promises purchased made through Caldo Verde's website) (July 13, 2010)
- CVPRO4: Live at Union Chapel & Södra Teatern, Mark Kozelek (free CD given away with purchases from Caldo Verde's website) (March 1, 2011)

== See also ==
- List of record labels
