= Electric Trim =

Studio album by Lee Ranaldo
- Released: September 15, 2017
- Recorded: April 2015–April 2016 at Echo Canyon West in Hoboken, New Jersey and Estudios Calamar, Barcelona, Spain
- Genre: Alternative rock, experimental rock, acoustic rock
- Length: 55:07
- Label: Mute
- Producer: Lee Ranaldo; Raül Refree

Lee Ranaldo chronology
Acoustic Dust (2013)	Electric Trim (2017)

Professional ratings
Aggregate scores
Source	Rating
Metacritic	73/100
Review scores
Source	Rating
AllMusic	4/5 stars
Pitchfork	6.5/10
The Line of Best Fit	6.5/10
The Music	3.5/5 stars

Electric Trim is the twelfth studio album by American musician Lee Ranaldo, the former Sonic Youth guitarist, released on September 15, 2017, on Mute Records, marking his first solo album to be released on the label. The album was produced by Ranaldo along with Spanish musician Raül Refree. The album features several musicians, including Sharon Van Etten, Steve Shelley, Alan Licht, and Nels Cline.

== Reception ==
The album has been met with positive reviews from music critics. On Metacritic, which assigns a normalised rating out of 100 to reviews from mainstream publications, it received an average score of 73, based on 13 reviews.

== Track listing ==
All tracks are written by Lee Ranaldo and Jonathan Lethem, except tracks 1, 3 and 4 by Ranaldo.

No.	Title	Length
1.	"Moroccan Mountains"	7:28
2.	"Uncle Skeleton"	5:18
3.	"Let's Start Again"	5:28
4.	"Last Looks" (featuring Sharon Van Etten)	6:26
5.	"Circular (Right as Rain)"	4:27
6.	"Electric Trim"	6:26
7.	"Purloined"	5:11
8.	"Thrown Over the Wall"	7:26
9.	"New Thing"	6:49
Total length:		55:07

Japanese bonus track

No.	Title	Length
10.	"Sans Rat" (Electric Trim Demo)

== Personnel ==
- Lee Ranaldo – vocals, acoustic guitars, electric guitars, keyboards, electronics, drums, marimba, record producer, mixing

Additional members

- Raül Refree – productions, mixing, acoustic guitars, electric guitars, keyboards, electronics, drums, bass guitars, backing vocals
- Sharon Van Etten – additional vocals on "Last Looks"
- Mar Girona – backing vocals
- Alan Licht – electric guitars
- Nels Cline – electric guitars
- Xavi de la Salud – trumpets, flugelhorn
- Tim Luntzel – bajo quinto
- Kid Millions – drums, percussions
- Steve Shelley – drums, percussions
- Cody Ranaldo – electronics
- Greg Calbi – mastering at Sterling Sound, New York City in January 2017
