= Between the Times and the Tides =

Studio album by Lee Ranaldo
- Released: March 20, 2012
- Recorded: January–July 2011
- Studios: Echo Canyon West, Hoboken, New Jersey
- Genres: Alternative rock, experimental rock
- Length: 47:39
- Label: Matador
- Producers: John Agnello, Lee Ranaldo

Lee Ranaldo chronology
Maelstrom from Drift (2008)	Between the Times and the Tides (2012)	Last Night on Earth (2013)

Singles from Between the Times and the Tides
- 1. "Off the Wall" Released: January 14, 2012; 2. "Shouts" Released: May 8, 2012

Between the Times and the Tides is the ninth studio album by the American alternative rock musician Lee Ranaldo, released on March 20, 2012 on Matador Records. His first release on Matador Records and since Sonic Youth's indefinite hiatus, the album features a more straightforward songwriting approach to his prior material and includes guest musicians such as Nels Cline, John Medeski and Leah Singer. The album was originally intended to be a minimalist acoustic album but its sound was developed by Ranaldo during its recording at Echo Canyon West in Hoboken, New Jersey during a seven-month period in early 2011.

Between the Times and the Tide's sound was influenced by Joni Mitchell, Neil Young, and Leonard Cohen, as well as contemporary artists such as Cat Power. The title of the album comes from a lyric in the song "Xtina as I Knew Her." Upon its release, Between the Times and the Tides received positive critical acclaim and charted in four countries, including Belgium, France, Germany and the United States. Its two singles—"Off the Wall" and "Shouts"—were moderate critical successes but failed to chart. The album's release was followed by two tours of North America and Oceania from April to October 2012, which included appearances at various music festivals, including All Tomorrow's Parties I'll Be Your Mirror and the Melbourne International Arts Festival.

== Background ==
During his time as the lead guitarist of Sonic Youth, Lee Ranaldo had considered recording a "simple, acoustic album" of original songs "with just an acoustic guitar and a microphone." After the release of Maelstrom from Drift—a collection of group improvisations, live recordings and home studio sessions—in 2008, Ranaldo's plans developed further. Following Sonic Youth's indefinite hiatus, he began arranging the material with contributors such as Nels Cline, John Medeski, and Bob Bert. All three musicians, except Bert, had recorded renditions of Bob Dylan songs for the soundtrack to his 2007 biopic, I'm Not There, as The Million Dollar Bashers. Most of the material he began arranging had been written between June and August 2010 when the songs "just kept flowing out behind that one ["Lost"]."

== Recording ==
Ranaldo originally recorded acoustic demos for Between the Times and the Tides on his iPhone. He later rerecorded them in-studio with Steve Shelley, the drummer of Sonic Youth. According to Ranaldo, the subsequent demo recording led to the development of the songs, which then became "guitar-and-bass-and-drums demos." He referred to the recording process of the album as "gradual but really organic." When he began recording the album in January 2011 at Echo Canyon West in Hoboken, New Jersey, Ranaldo "started laying them down in a little bit more hi–fi fashion", using studio equipment and effects pedals.

Ranaldo used his signature Fender Jazzmaster guitar during the recording sessions of Between the Times and the Tides and a custom-built electric guitar by Jarrell Guitars. Several Martin and Gibson acoustic guitars were used, including a Martin D-35, Martin 00018, Gibson J-50 and Gibson J-45. Various equipment—such as Fender Prosonic and Fender Super Reverb amplifiers, Ibanez Analog Delay, Voodoo Lab Sparkle Drive, BJF Electronics' Honey Bee and DOD Two Second Digital Delay effects pedals—was used during the recording sessions to contribute to the album's sound.

== Composition ==
Between the Times and the Tides features material composed solely by Ranaldo. The album features a more "song-led approach" to his previous material, which is largely considered noise rock. According to Ranaldo, he did not "deliberately" suppress noise composition but with earlier acoustic versions of the songs he would "often kind of 'Sonic' them up." The album's overall sound has been described as "a set of catchy, poppy tunes that establish a new aspect in [Ranaldo's] career." Ranaldo further explained that "it wasn't a conscious choice to write pop songs, they just sprung out of the guitars."

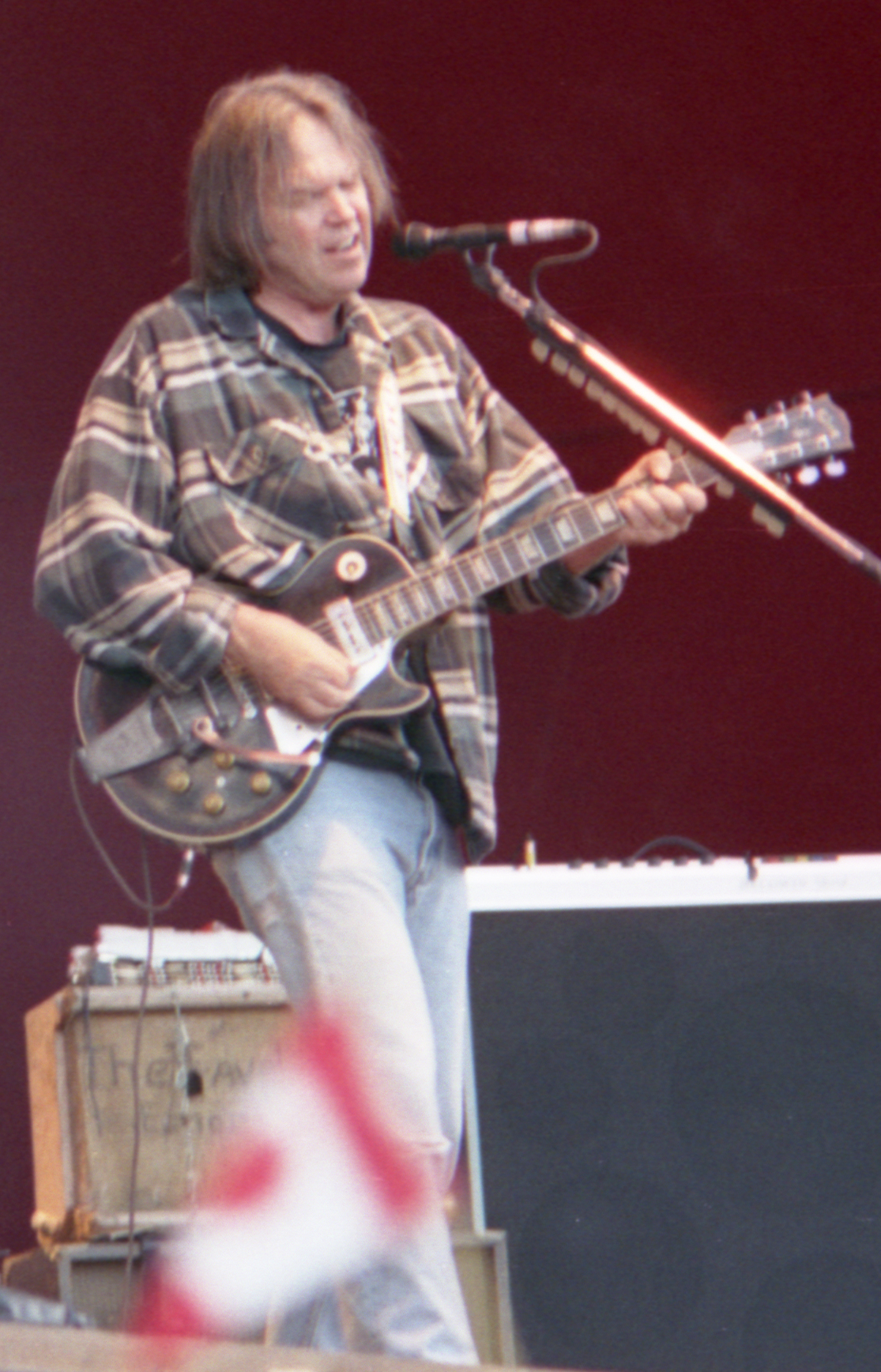
Several musicians, including Neil Young (pictured in 1996), influenced Between the Times and the Tides' sound

Certain musicians influenced Ranaldo's songwriting including Joni Mitchell, Neil Young, Leonard Cohen and Cat Power, which he referred to as "a kind of older generation of songwriting." He also mentioned Bob Dylan's Blonde on Blonde (1966) as a particular influence. Ranaldo stated that "these songs were allowed to breathe because they weren't sent through the fan machine. When Sonic Youth writes music, we write everything in a very communal way. It doesn't matter who brought something in initially, it all gets transformed by the band. In this case, I was making decisions, and I wanted them to have a certain kind of simplicity. They ended up more personal for that reason."

All of the songs on Between the Times and the Tides are composed in alternate guitar tunings, except "Fire Island" which is composed in standard tuning. Speaking of the use of tunings on the album, Ranaldo said "they're all brand-new tunings on this album, none of them are from the Sonic Youth period. They're things that started happening, and you just sort of roll with it." He further explained that "Fire Island" was the first song he composed in standard tuning since Sonic Youth's debut EP, released in 1982. "Waiting on a Dream", the album's opening track, contains a guitar riff that, according to Damian Fanelli, resembles The Rolling Stones' 1966 song "Paint It, Black" and "Tomorrow Never Comes", the album's closing track, references The Beatles' 1966 song "Tomorrow Never Knows."

== Packaging ==
"The figures from Maya Barkai's public artwork cover three sides of a city block with images of the 'walking man' symbol as it's interpreted in 99 different global cities. It's a beautiful work, and it's in my neighborhood. I didn't really realize it at the time, but I like the fact that the cover photo was taken locally, in my 'hood. The artwork actually has the names of the various cities over each figure—we had to remove them to put the album title there, but I really liked the image of me walking with all these city names over my head; it felt like an image that reflected the traveling minstrel/touring life."

— Lee Ranaldo on Between the Time and the Tides' cover art.

Ranaldo and Matt De Jong designed Between the Times and the Tides' artwork, which included photographs by Kelly Jeffrey and Ranaldo's son, Cody. The front cover art features Ranaldo walking past "Walking Men 99"—an art project in Lower Manhattan, New York, created by artist Maya Barkai. Ranaldo became interested in the project as he passed it daily and contacted Barkai who was "humbled to be approached by Lee."

Speaking of the album cover, Ranaldo said: "in some ways the whole album started with the cover photo, and I kind of built it up from there. A young Canadian photographer took that photo of me in September 2010 during an interview session about legendary Canadian group The Nihilist Spasm Band. When I saw the photo I thought it looked so much like a cool album cover. At that point I only had three or four acoustic demos going, and it remained in the back of my mind that if I ever made enough songs for an album, I'd use that pic as the cover. So that helped push me to develop the songs."

== Release ==
On November 10, 2011, Between the Times and the Tides was announced for release through an online blog post by Matador Records. The title of the album comes from a lyric in the song "Xtina as I Knew Her". The album was released worldwide on March 20, 2012 on Matador. It was released in a number of formats, including CD, LP, FLAC and MP3. Demo versions of "Stranded", "Shouts" and "Waiting on a Dream" were included as bonus tracks on the iTunes version of the release. Two singles were released from the album: "Off the Wall" and "Shouts". "Off the Wall" was released as a 7" record and digital download package on January 14 and "Shouts", which featured alternate mixes not found on the album, was released on May 8.

Ranaldo promoted Between the Times and the Tides' release with a 28-date tour throughout the United States and Europe, with Wilco, Disappears, and M. Ward supporting. The tour began on April 10, 2010 at The Satellite in Los Angeles, California and concluded on August 3 at the Highland Bowl in Rochester, New York. In October, Ranaldo performed three shows in Australia at the Oxford Art Factory in Sydney on October 20, The Zoo in Brisbane on October 21 and at The Hi-Fi on October 24, as part of the Melbourne Festival. Local Australian bands Pony Face and We All Want To supported Ranaldo's performances in Sydney and Brisbane.

Between the Times and the Tides charted in four countries upon its release. It reached number 79 on the Belgian Albums Chart in Flanders, number 149 on the French Albums Chart and number 92 on the German Albums Chart. In the U.S., the album peaked at number 13 on Billboard's Heatseeker Albums chart and number 24 on the Tastemaker Albums chart.

== Reception ==
Professional ratings
Review scores
Source	Rating
AllMusic	4/5 stars
The A.V. Club	B
Drowned in Sound	8/10
FILTER	86%
The Guardian	2/5 stars
MSN Music (Expert Witness)	A−
NME	7/10
Pitchfork	5.2/10
Q	4/5 stars
Rolling Stone	3/5 stars

Between the Times and the Tides received generally positive reviews from critics. At Metacritic, which assigns a normalised rating out of 100 to reviews from mainstream publications, it received an average score of 74, based on 24 reviews. Writing for MSN Music, Robert Christgau said Ranaldo's beautifully played guitar work and monophonic compositions complement his good-natured, cogent lyrics, which are "always palpable whether the songs reach out or recalibrate his options". AllMusic reviewer Heather Phares wrote that he "expands on those qualities in his music and reveals new ones", "displays a strong and surprising classic rock streak" and "gets downright hippie-ish, in a good way." In a review for The A.V. Club, Elliott Sharp said "Ranaldo's songs mostly adhere to a guitar-driven melancholic-pop mold, with songs like 'Off The Wall,' 'Angles,' and 'Lost' recalling Sonic Youth's 2006 effort Rather Ripped as well as early R.E.M.". Spencer Grady from BBC Music compared the music to The Byrds, Neil Young and R.E.M., and added that "flaws which initially seem awkward begin to make perfect sense after a few listens". Drowned in Sound's J.R. Moores said it was "advertised as his first 'rock album'" and impresses sonically. Filter critic Loren Auda Poin wrote "at times sounding like Hendrix operating a theremin, and elsewhere resembling the mournful cries of lonesome satellites", Ranaldo's songs "are accomplished and take surprising turns, shot through with a mellow fury that's endlessly appealing."

In a less enthusiastic review for The Guardian, Killian Fox said Between the Times and the Tides was "more interesting sonically in the tension between questing guitars and straightforward song structures than it is in terms of lyrics, which aim to be down to earth but end up middle of the road." NME writer John Doran wrote, "sure enough here are a wealth of rock gems that shine with a warm-hearted, Neil Young-like intensity. Those wanting clangour and dissonance will be disappointed, but everyone else will be pleasantly surprised." Writing for Pitchfork, Grayson Currin deemed it a "motley assortment of Sonic Youth nods, acoustic entreaties, and cloying pop-rockers" but that "Ranaldo's opportunity to step out of the Sonic Youth shadows and into his own proper spotlight is mostly a miss made of mediocrity." Ben Graham from The Quietus summarised the album as: "while it may be traditional in structure, Between the Times and the Tides is innovative and inimitable in actual performance. The playing may draw on jazz, country, rock and Ranaldo's own avant-garde catalogue." In Rolling Stone, Will Hermes found it "great to hear the third voice in Sonic Youth stretching out. But it's also a reminder of their irreplaceable magic."

== Track listing ==
All tracks are written by Lee Ranaldo.

No.	Title	Length
1.	"Waiting on a Dream"	6:14
2.	"Off the Wall"	3:04
3.	"Xtina as I Knew Her"	7:04
4.	"Angles"	3:17
5.	"Hammer Blows"	4:04
6.	"Fire Island (Phases)"	6:07
7.	"Lost (Planet Nice)"	3:59
8.	"Shouts"	4:54
9.	"Stranded"	4:20
10.	"Tomorrow Never Comes"	4:30
Total length:		47:39

iTunes bonus tracks
No.	Title	Length
11.	"Stranded" (demo version)	4:33
12.	"Shouts" (demo version)	4:50
13.	"Waiting on a Dream" (demo version)	6:26
Total length:		63:28

== Personnel ==
All personnel credits adapted from Between the Times and the Tides' liner notes.

Performer

- Lee Ranaldo – vocals, guitar, production, recording, design

Other musicians

- Alan Licht – guitar, marimba
- Nels Cline – guitar, lap steel guitar
- Irwin Menken – bass
- Steve Shelley – drums
- John Medeski – piano, organ
- Kathy Leisen – backing vocals (1, 2, 4, 8)
- Bob Bert – congas (5, 8)
- Leah Singer – backing vocals (8)

Technical personnel

- John Agnello – production, engineering, mixing
- Aaron Mullan – assistant mixing, recording
- Ted Young – assistant mixing
- Bentley Anderson – recording
- Tim Glasgow – recording
- Greg Calbi – mastering

Art personnel

- Matt De Jong – design, layout
- Kelly Jeffrey – photography
- Cody Ranaldo – photography, digital editing

== Chart positions ==
Chart (2012)	Peak position
Belgian Albums Chart (Flanders)	79
French Albums Chart	149
German Albums Chart	92
U.S. Billboard Heatseeker Albums	13
U.S. Billboard Tastemaker Albums	24
