= Scoot (EP) =

EP by Run On
- Released: 1997
- Genre: Indie rock, art rock
- Length: 15:37
- Label: Sonic Bubblegum

Run On chronology
No Way (1997)	Scoot (1997)	Sit Down (1997)

Professional ratings
Review scores
Source	Rating
Allmusic	3/5 stars

Scoot is an EP by Run On, released in 1997 through Sonic Bubblegum.

== Track listing ==
All tracks are written by Run On.

No.	Title	Length
1.	"Complainer(s)"	2:41
2.	"Hit Run"	5:10
3.	"Renee Away"	7:45
4.	"Copper Kettle"	4:13

== Personnel ==
- Rick Brown – drums, synthesizer, vocals
- Sue Garner – bass guitar, guitar, piano, vocals, design
- Katie Gentile – violin, organ, vocals
- Alan Licht – guitar
