= Elektrisk Regn =

- Origin: Bergen, Norway
- Genres: New wave; psychedelic rock; progressive rock
- Years active: 1978–2008
- Labels: Apollon; Rec 90
- Members: Dennis Reksten; Harald Nilsen; Trond Osland; Tom Kogstad; Harald Pallesen; Erik Reksten; Sam Fossbakk; Ine Tømmerås; Bjørn Vassbotn; Rune Kogstad; Morten Eide; Jan Gunnar Bortheim; Ragnar "Raggi" Kolstad

Elektrisk Regn is a new wave punk band from Bergen, Norway, founded in 1978. They appeared when new wave started growing in Norway with such bands as De Press, the Aller Værste! and Kjøtt. El-Regn was one of the first bands to introduce the underground genre in Norway.

== Biography ==
The lead vocalist is the well known Dennis Reksten, who worked at Bergen's most famous rock bar, Garage. Elektrisk Regn writes Norwegian lyrics and sing in Bergen dialect. Their debut studio album Steinbyen was released in 1982 and shows that Reksten manages to write both funny and serious lyrics concerning serious themes (some times heavy political themes). Their most famous song is “Naboen er nynazist” (“My neighbour is a neo-Nazi”).

Their second studio album Kropp uten sjel arrived three years later, but then they had to wait till 2002 before the next album was released. Stein igjen shows that the band still knows how to make great new wave rock, but they never managed to reach the charts.

They arranged gigs on an irregular basis in Bergen from time to time.

== Band members ==
- Dennis Reksten, synth, guitar, vocal, text and melody (1978–present)
- Harald Nilsen, bass (1978–present)
- Trond Osland, guitar (1987–present)
- Tom Kogstad, percussion (1979–present)
- Ine Tømmerås, vocal, synth (1982–present)
- Jan Gunnar Bortheim, guitar (1987–present)
- Harald Pallesen, synth, guitar, vocal (1978–1982)
- Erik Reksten, percussion (1978–1979)
- Sam Fossbakk, guitar (1981–1982)
- Bjørn Vassbotten, guitar (1982–1987)
- Rune Kogstad, percussion (1985–1987)
- Morten Eide, bass (1985–1987)
- Ragnar "Raggi" Kolstad (2002)

== Discography ==
- Steinbyen (LP 1982 Apollon Records, Rec 90 CD with extra tracks 1994)
- Sterkt stoff (LP 1982 Apollon Records)
- Kropp uten sjel (LP 1985)
- "Hilsen ElRegn" (single 1987)
- "Naboen er nynazist" (single 1994)
- Stein igjen Rec 90 (CD 2002)
- Reprise (CD 2006, soundtrack)
