= East Jesus =

East Jesus may refer to:

- A small town in the middle of nowhere
- East Jesus, an art installation at Slab City in southern California, USA
- East Jesus (album), a compilation of music by Lee Ranaldo

== See also ==
- East Jesus Nowhere, a song by Green Day
