= Reksten =

Reksten is a Norwegian surname. Notable people with this surname include:

- Dennis Reksten, Norwegian musician
- Egil Reksten (1917–2009), Norwegian engineer
- Grace Reksten Skaugen (born 1953), Norwegian executive
- Hilmar Reksten (1897–1980), Norwegian shipping magnate
