= Scriptures of the Golden Eternity =

Live album by Lee Ranaldo
- Released: 1993 (vinyl LP); 1995 (CD)
- Recorded: July 18, 1988 and November 28, 1989
- Genre: Noise music, lo-fi
- Length: 48:15
- Label: Father Yod (vinyl LP); Drunken Fish (CD)
- Producer: Lee Ranaldo

Lee Ranaldo chronology
A Perfect Day EP (1992)	Scriptures of the Golden Eternity (1993)	Broken Circle / Spiral Hill EP (1994)

Professional ratings
Review scores
Source	Rating
Allmusic	4.5/5 stars

Scriptures of the Golden Eternity is a solo album by guitarist Lee Ranaldo, who also performs in rock band Sonic Youth. It was released on vinyl by the Father Yod label, and later reissued on CD by the Drunken Fish label. The cover design is by visual artist Savage Pencil. The album consists of three untitled tracks featuring a solo Ranaldo performing guitar, tape loops, and occasional vocal. The first was recorded on 18 July 1988, and the remaining two were recorded on 28 November 1989.

Unlike his first solo work From Here to Infinity, Scriptures of the Golden Eternity was recorded live at two solo performances Ranaldo gave in New York City, around the same period when Sonic Youth were recording their landmark albums Daydream Nation and Goo. During the first minutes of opening track, Ranaldo relates a story recalled from an episode of The Adventures of Superman (which Ranaldo refers to as "not the cartoon, but the real show") where a kidnapped guest character had left as a clue for Superman two tape loops of a person's voice saying "hello" in an echo chamber and a sound effect of a cannon firing, the clue meaning "Echo Canyon". Echo Canyon would subsequently become the name of Sonic Youth's private studio where several of their later period Geffen Records and SYR Records albums were recorded.

The liner notes state that the album is "Dedicated to the Diamond Sutra and the Spirit of the Eternal Now!".

== Track listing ==
No track titles are given anywhere on the liner notes. Emusic and the iTunes Music Store list the individual song titles on their respective downloading menus as their respective track numbers.

1. One (22:42)
2. Two (15:05)
3. Three (10:28)

== Other similarly titled works ==
- Scriptures of the Golden Eternity is also the title of a short manual written by Jack Kerouac.
