= Walking Men Worldwide =

A pedestrian symbol, also known as a walk sign, crossing light, or walking man. This photo is not affiliated with the art project.

Walking Men Worldwide is a series of public art installations by artist Maya Barkai. The project is a collaboration created by numerous photographers who submit photographs of electronic pedestrian signals - "walking men" - from locations all over the world.

== Exhibition history ==
The project debuted in January 2010 in Manhattan in an installation entitled Walking Men 99, located at 99 Church Street. Walking Men 99 is a 500-foot-long mural of 99 "walk" symbols from cities worldwide which was exhibited over the following four years. The installation was created as part of the Alliance for Downtown New York's Re:Construction Program, with the goal of beautifying construction sites around Lower Manhattan, which is in a constant renewal process since 9/11.

Additional installations include Walking Men PERMM (2010), created in collaboration with the PERMM Museum of Contemporary Art in Perm Krai, Russia, as well as Walking Men Worldwide - The Banner Gallery, which was part of the Art & About Sydney Festival(2013), where more than 600 banners depicting Walking Men icons covered the city. The event was repeated conjunction with Walk 21 Sydney in 2014.

Men At Work, composed of over fifty-five life-size renderings of the ‘working men’ figures from cities around the world, was on display at the Bat-Yam International Biennale of Landscape Urbanism in Israel in 2010. The following year, Barkai presented Men At Work NYC surrounding the construction site of Four World Trade Center. The project, which was unveiled on September 11, 2011, depicted nearly 150 figures.

== Special Projects ==
- A set of two limited edition screen prints featuring artwork from Walking Men Worldwide, and Men At Work NYC were published in 2012.
- Imagery from the installation Walking Men 99 decorates the album cover of Between the Times and the Tides, the ninth studio album by the American alternative rock musician Lee Ranaldo (also member of American rock band Sonic Youth), released on March 20, 2012 on Matador Records.
