= Apollon platebar =

Record shop and bar in Bergen, Norway

Apollon Platebar
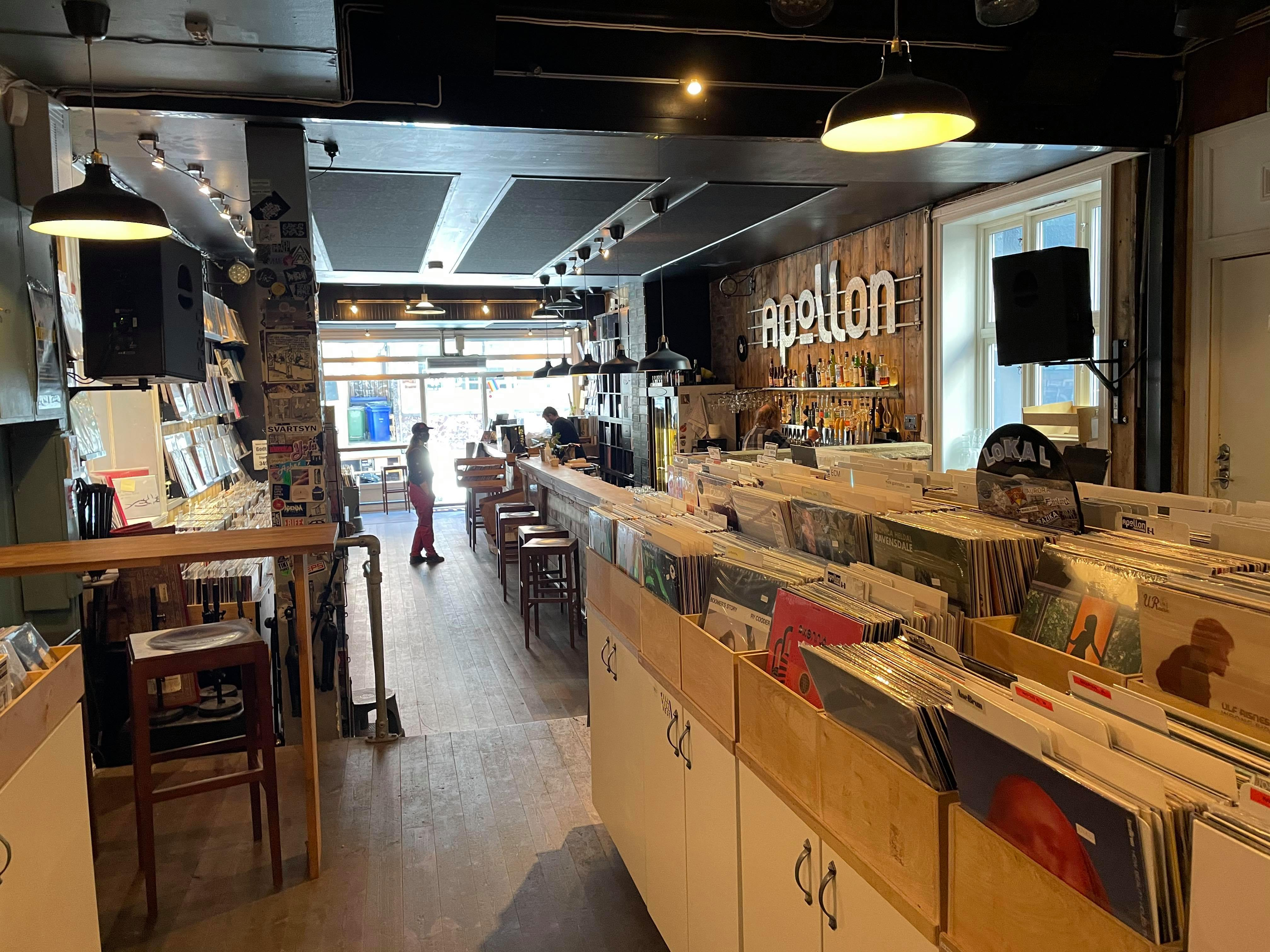
- Interior of Apollon Platebar
- Interactive map of Apollon Platebar
- Address: Nygårdsgaten 2A
- Location: Bergen, Norway
- Coordinates: 60.3877°N 5.3257°E
- Owner: Jonn Larsen Hoen; Einar Engelstad; Tor Tessem; Tor Inge Baldersheim
- Type: Record store, bar and live music venue

Construction
- Opened: 1978 (store); 1976 (mail-order business)

Apollon Platebar is an independent record store, bar and live music venue in Bergen, Norway. Founded in 1976, it is Norway's longest-running independent record store. The store specializes in classic rock, folk music, psychedelic music, indie rock and heavy metal, and sells vinyl records, CDs and other physical music formats.

== History ==
Apollon was founded by Frode Svanevik in 1976 as a small import and mail-order business. The first retail store opened in 1978 at Nøstet in Bergen. At a time when imported music was difficult to obtain in Norway, Apollon became known for offering international releases before they reached most other Norwegian record stores.

The store established a reputation within Bergen's music scene by focusing on alternative and niche genres rather than mainstream popular music, and became a popular meeting place for musicians, students and music enthusiasts.

In 1980, Apollon relocated to the corner of Christies gate and Nygårdsgaten, in premises later occupied by the rock club Garage. That same year, Einar Engelstad joined the business. In the early 1990s, the store moved to its present location in Nygårdsgaten.

== Bar and cultural venue ==
In 2012, Apollon opened a bar inside the record store in response to declining CD sales. It became the only retail store in Bergen to receive a licence to serve alcohol based on its status as a cultural institution.

The venue regularly hosts concerts by emerging artists, mini-festivals and other cultural events. The bar offers 46 beers on tap.

== Decline of physical music sales ==
Like other independent record stores, Apollon was affected by the rapid decline in physical music sales following the growth of digital downloads and streaming services. By the early 2010s, the business was operating at a loss.

In May 2014, the store organized Apollon Aid, a benefit concert featuring local artists to raise funds and secure its future. The business subsequently recovered, helped by increased media attention, a growing number of international visitors and the launch of an online store.

== International recognition ==
Apollon Platebar has received international attention as one of Bergen's distinctive cultural attractions. In 2014, the New York Post included the venue among its recommendations for visitors to Bergen. In 2019, The New York Times featured Apollon in its guide Five Places to Visit in Bergen, Norway.

== Tønsberg ==
In June 2021, a second Apollon store opened in Tønsberg, combining a record store and bar based on the same concept as the Bergen location.

== Awards ==
In August 2021, Apollon Platebar was voted Bergen's Best Bar in a competition organized by Bergens Tidende.
