= Dennis Reksten =

- Also known as: Dennis
- Born: Sven Johan Reksten; 12 September 1949; Bergen, Hordaland
- Origin: Norway
- Genres: Punk rock, new wave
- Instruments: Vocals, guitar, keyboard
- Member of: Elektrisk Regn

Sven Johan Reksten (born 12 September 1949 in Bergen, Norway), also known as Dennis Reksten, is a Norwegian musician, composer and music producer, known from bands like Elektrisk Regn.

== Biography ==
Reksten has been part of the Bergen rock scene for almost 50 years, and has released the albums Steinbyen (1982), Kropp Uten Sjel (1984), Stein Igjen (2002) with Elektrisk Regn, in addition to the EP Hilsen El-Regn (1987). He also wrote the song «Oslo By», a combat song when the Bergen football team Brann met the Oslo team Lyn in the Norwegian Cup final 2004. Reksten has been engaged in the rock club Garage since its opening in the late 1980s, arranging concerts in this Bergen rock venue.

== Discography ==
With Elektrisk Regn

- 1982: Steinbyen (Apollon Records)
- 1984: Kropp Uten Sjel (Robot Records)
- 1987: Hilsen El Regn EP (Robot Records)
- 2002: Stein Igjen (Self Release)

With Zimmerman

- 1982: LP 4 (Notabene Records)
- 2007: Till You Know What I Mean (JOA Music)

With Enslaved

- 2001: Monumension (Osmose Productions)
- 2003: Below The Lights (Osmose Productions)

== Honours and mentions ==
On the 2018 album This Is My Dinner Sun Kil Moon sings a verse about Reksten. In 2019 Reksten received the King's Medal of Merit.
