= Sitdown =

Sitdown, Sit Down or sit-down may refer to the following:

- Sit-down hydrofoil, a water sport in which one rides above the water, supported by a hydrofoil wing
- Sitdown strike, a strike in which workers take possession of a workplace by "sitting down"
- Sit-down restaurant, a type of restaurant
- Sitdown, a type of powerbomb, a professional wrestling throw
- A meeting, terminology frequently used in mafia media, such as The Godfather franchise
- In British Methodism, "to sit down" is a technical phrase referring to Ministers ceasing active stipendiary work to become "supernumerary" ministers

== Music ==
- Sit Down (EP), a 1997 EP by Run On
- "Sit Down" (song), a 1989 song by James
- "Sit Down" (Delta Rhythm Boys song)
- "Sit Down" (Kent Jones song)
- "Sit Down!", a 2020 song by NCT 127 on Neo Zone

== See also ==
- Sit-in, a form of direct action that involves one or more people nonviolently occupying an area for a protest
- Sitting, a body position
