= Jesu/Sun Kil Moon =

Jesu / Sun Kil Moon

Studio album by Jesu and Sun Kil Moon
- Released: January 21, 2016
- Recorded: Wales and the United States
- Genres: Post-metal; indie folk; electronic; ambient; spoken word
- Length: 79:39
- Language: English
- Labels: Caldo Verde, Rough Trade
- Producers: Justin Broadrick and Mark Kozelek

Sun Kil Moon chronology
| Universal Themes (2015) | Jesu / Sun Kil Moon (2016) | Common as Light and Love Are Red Valleys of Blood (2017) |

Mark Kozelek chronology
| Dreams of Childhood (2015) | Jesu/Sun Kil Moon (2016) | Mark Kozelek Sings Favorites (2016) |

Jesu chronology
| Everyday I Get Closer to the Light from Which I Came (2013) | Jesu / Sun Kil Moon (2016) | 30 Seconds to the Decline of Planet Earth (2017) |

Jesu / Sun Kil Moon is a collaborative studio album by American indie folk act Sun Kil Moon and British experimental act Jesu, released on January 21, 2016 on Caldo Verde Records and Rough Trade. The album also features guest musicians Will Oldham (a.k.a. Bonnie "Prince" Billy), members of Low, Rachel Goswell of Slowdive, and Isaac Brock of Modest Mouse. Jesu and Sun Kil Moon including drummer Steve Shelley of Sonic Youth played six shows in February and March 2016 to support the album.

== Background ==
Mark Kozelek first hinted at the collaborative album in an interview in the January 2015 issue of Uncut magazine, and officially announced on April 27, 2015, by Jesu frontman Justin Broadrick via Twitter. In the tweet Broadrick said, "A lot of questions about a new Jesu record, I've been working on it for some time, it's a collaboration LP between Sun Kil Moon and Jesu."

The album grew out of a long-standing relationship between Broadrick and Sun Kil Moon frontman Mark Kozelek. Kozelek first approached Broadrick in 2007 about a release through his label, after being impressed by a live performance in San Francisco. In 2009 Jesu released Opiate Sun through Caldo Verde Records (a record label owned by Kozelek), and later the same year Broadrick interviewed Kozelek for the Caldo Verde website. In 2013, Kozelek covered Broadrick's band Godflesh's song "Like Rats". Broadrick and Godflesh are mentioned in "The Possum", the opening track from Sun Kil Moon's 2015 album Universal Themes.

On October 5, 2015, the track "America's Most Wanted Mark Kozelek and John Dillinger" was made available for streaming; on October 21 the track "Exodus" was available for streaming, pre-orders of the album's CDs were enabled, and Isaac Brock of Modest Mouse was added to the album's guesting musicians. On January 15, 2016, a week before the album's official January 22 release date, the project was available to stream in full on Sun Kil Moon's website.

== Critical reception ==
Professional ratings
Aggregate scores
| Source | Rating |
|---|---|
| AnyDecentMusic? | 6.5/10 |
| Metacritic | 75/100 |
Review scores
| Source | Rating |
| AllMusic | 3.5/5 stars |
| Consequence of Sound | B− |
| Drowned in Sound | 7/10 |
| Pitchfork | 7.5/10 |
| The Skinny | 4/5 stars |
| Slant Magazine | 2.5/5 stars |
| Spectrum Culture | 3.5/5 stars |
| Uncut | 8/10 |

Jesu/Sun Kil Moon was positively received by critics. Reviews of the album discussed its combination of Mark Kozelek's songwriting with the musical contributions of Justin K. Broadrick, reflecting the collaboration between Sun Kil Moon and Jesu.

== Track listing ==
All tracks are written by Mark Kozelek and Justin Broadrick, except where noted.

| No. | Title | Writer(s) | Length |
|---|---|---|---|
| 1. | "Good Morning My Love" | | 7:04 |
| 2. | "Carondelet" | | 8:36 |
| 3. | "A Song of Shadows" | | 6:19 |
| 4. | "Last Night I Rocked the Room Like Elvis and Had Them Laughing Like Richard Pryor" | Kozelek, Broadrick, Victor Rinaldi | 8:03 |
| 5. | "Fragile" (contains lyric extractions from "Onward" originally performed by Yes) | Kozelek, Chris Squire | 5:57 |
| 6. | "Father's Day" | | 6:12 |
| 7. | "Sally" | | 6:27 |
| 8. | "America's Most Wanted Mark Kozelek and John Dillinger" | Kozelek, Broadrick, Tania from Sheffield | 7:15 |
| 9. | "Exodus" | Kozelek, Chris Connolly | 9:45 |
| 10. | "Beautiful You" | | 14:01 |

== Personnel ==
Musicians

- Mark Kozelek – vocals, nylon string guitar on "Fragile"
- Justin Broadrick – all instruments (on all tracks except "Fragile" and "Exodus")
- Chris Connolly – keyboards on "Exodus"
- Will Oldham – guest vocals on "Fragile"
- Rachel Goswell – guest vocals on "Father's Day", "Exodus", and "Beautiful You"
- Alan Sparhawk – guest vocals on "Exodus"
- Mimi Parker – guest vocals on "Exodus"
- Isaac Brock – guest vocals on "Beautiful You"

Production

- Produced by Justin Broadrick and Mark Kozelek
- Recorded by Justin Broadrick, Will Chason, and Nathan Winter
- Additional recording by Steve Clarke and Jeremy Sherrer
- Mixed by Will Chason and Nathan Winter
- Cover photo of Mark Kozelek and Macha Kouznetsova by Steve Shelley
- Back cover photo by Mark Kozelek
- Inside photo of Broadrick and Kozelek by Mike Stevens
- Sleeve design by Brian Azer at Et Cetera
