= Steve Shelley =

American drummer (born 1962)

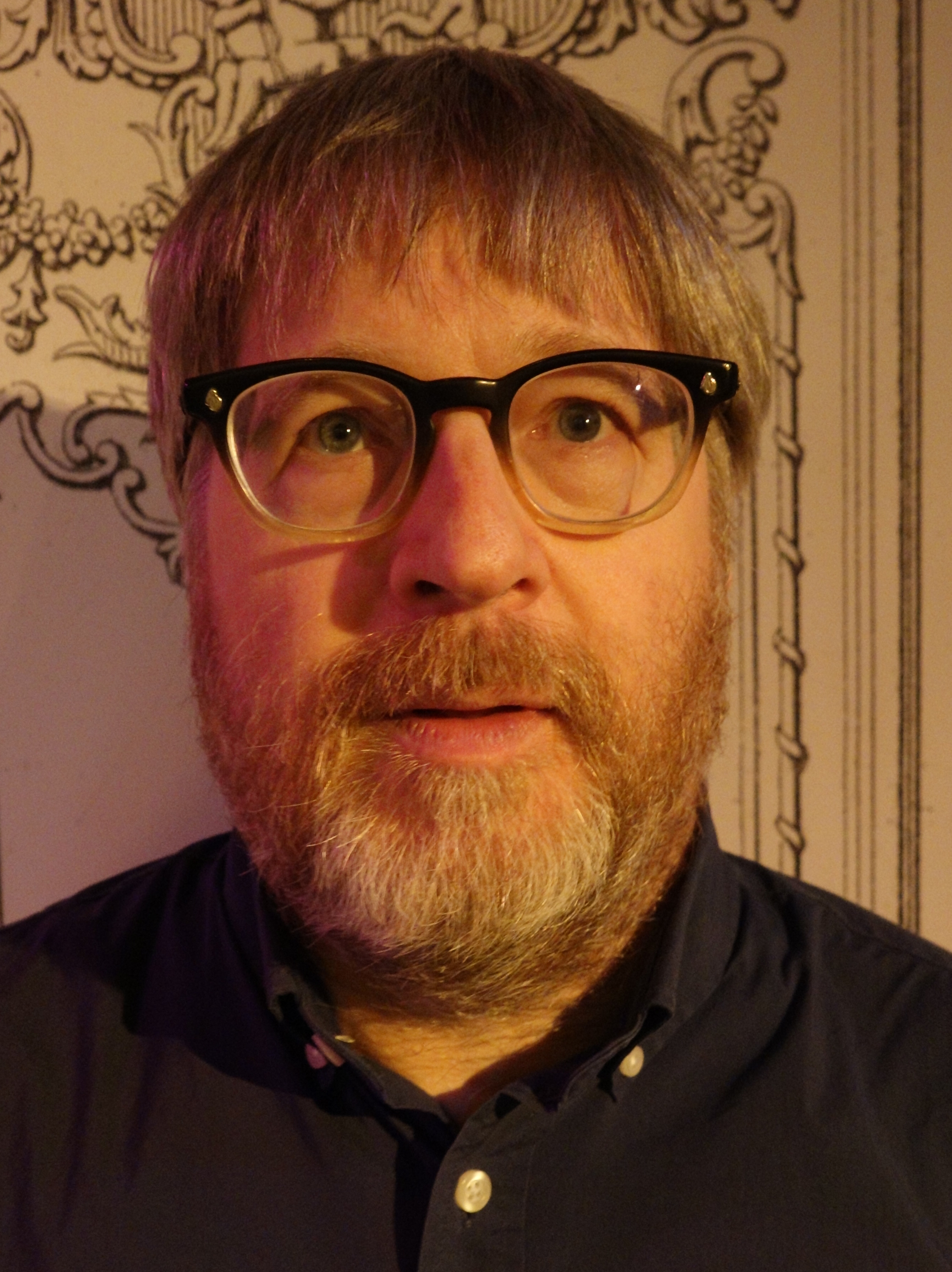
- Shelley in 2024

Background information
- Born: Steven Jay Shelley; June 23, 1962 (age 64); Midland, Michigan, U.S.
- Genres: Alternative rock; noise rock; hardcore punk; punk rock; experimental rock
- Occupations: Musician, producer
- Instrument: Drums
- Years active: 1983−present
- Labels: Alternative Tentacles, Geffen, Smells Like, SST, Matador

Steven Jay Shelley (born June 23, 1962) is an American drummer. He is best known as the longtime drummer of the alternative rock band Sonic Youth, for whom he played from 1985 until their 2011 disbandment.

== Biography ==
Shelley was born in Midland, Michigan, and played in several mid-Michigan bands, including Faith and Morals and Strange Fruit, and was among the original lineup of the punk band the Crucifucks. From 1985 to 2011, he performed with the noise rock band Sonic Youth, after replacing Bob Bert.

After leaving the Crucifucks, he moved to Manhattan with a friend, living in the apartment of Sonic Youth's Thurston Moore and Kim Gordon for dog sitting purposes while the band was in Europe. When the band returned, former drummer Bob Bert had left the band, and they hired Shelley as their drummer without an audition.

In 1992 he founded the independent record label Smells Like Records, based in Hoboken, New Jersey.

Along with friend and Two Dollar Guitar musician Tim Foljahn, he helped advance Cat Power's musical career, serving as drummer on her first three albums. He also produced Blonde Redhead's debut self-titled album in 1995. Steve was able to track down Lee Hazlewood in 1997 and secure permission to reissue five of the finest titles of the Hazlewood back catalog. Smells Like Records also released a collection of standards recorded in 1997, which was the first new recording from Hazlewood released domestically in nearly two decades. In 1998 Shelley played on the soundtrack of the film Velvet Goldmine as a member of Wylde Ratttz, along with the Stooges' Ron Asheton, Thurston Moore, Mike Watt, Don Fleming, Mark Arm of Mudhoney and Jim Dunbar.

Other significant work away from Sonic Youth include recording and performing with an array of artists such as Christina Rosenvinge, Chris Lee, John Wolfington, Michael Powers, Michael Rother, Howe Gelb, and Enrique Morente. In 2007, Shelley recorded a number of tracks for the I'm Not There soundtrack with a supergroup called The Million Dollar Bashers, featuring Lee Ranaldo, Wilco guitarist Nels Cline, Television guitarist Tom Verlaine, Dylan bassist Tony Garnier, guitarist Smokey Hormel and keyboardist John Medeski.

In February 2009, Shelley spent a weekend in Chicago recording with Chris Connelly, Sanford Parker, and Jeremy Lemos. The results of this collaboration were released under the moniker the High Confessions by Relapse Records on July 20, 2010.

In 2010, Michael Rother played shows in Europe with Shelley and Tall Firs guitarist Aaron Mullan as Halogallo 2010. This group performs music "in the spirit of" Neu! including some tracks by Harmonia and from Michael Rother's solo albums. Other 2010 concert dates included the ATP New York 2010 music festival in Monticello, New York, and Incubate 2010 in Tilburg, Netherlands.

His enthusiasm for the music of Daniel Johnston and Townes Van Zandt led to his appearances in the documentaries The Devil and Daniel Johnston and Be Here to Love Me.

Shelley is also in charge of operating Sonic Youth's own record labels, SYR and Goofin'. In 2010, he started a new label called Vampire Blues whose inaugural release was a 7" by Hallogallo 2010.

In 2011 he joined Disappears. In 2012, he left the band due to scheduling conflicts.

From 2014 to 2017, Shelley played the drums for Sun Kil Moon on the albums Benji, Universal Themes and Common as Light and Love Are Red Valleys of Blood. He also toured with Sun Kil Moon on select 2015 dates.

== Non-Sonic Youth discography ==
Date	Artist	Release	Comments
1983	Strange Fruit	On Top of the Hill	7" Babel 01
1984	Strange Fruit	Strange Fruit/Abiku	split 12" Babel 02
1985	Crucifucks	The Crucifucks	Alternative Tentacles 38
1989	Maureen Tucker	Life in Exile After Abdication	50 Skidillion Watts 007
1990	Daniel Johnston	1990	Shimmy Disc 028 (w/ Lee Ranaldo on "Spirit World Rising")
1991	Lucky Sperms	Lucky Sperms	7" Ecstatic Peace! 15 (recorded in 1987)
1991	Dim Stars	Dim Stars	3x7" Ecstatic Peace! 11
1991	Nikki Sudden	Whiskey Priest	7" Singles Only Label 228
1992	Jad Fair	I Like It When You Smile	Paperhouse 009
1992	Richard Hell	3 New Songs	7" Overground 24
1992	Mosquito	Down	7" ERL 9
1992	Makigami Koichi	Koroshi No Blues	Toshiba EMI 6496
1992	Dim Stars	Dim Stars	Caroline 1724
1992	Free Kitten/Mosquito	Split	7" Time Bomb 09
1992	Mosquito	U.F.O. Catcher	Time Bomb 13
1993	Mosquito	Oh No...	Psychoacoustic 6
1993	Mosquito	Time Was	SLR 05
1993	Two Dollar Guitar	Lost Bird	7" SLR 06
1994	The Raincoats	Extended Play	SLR 012
1995	Male Slut	Male Slut	7" Stomach Ache 57
1995	Cat Power	Dear Sir	Runt 6
1995	Thurston Moore	Psychic Hearts	DGC 24810
1995	Mike Watt	"Tuff Gnarl" Ball-Hog or Tugboat?	Columbia Records C2-66464
1996	Cat Power	Myra Lee	SLR 019
1996	Cat Power	What Would the Community Think	Matador OLE-202
1998	Mark Eitzel	Caught in a Trap...	Matador OLE-179
2000	Hungry Ghosts	Alone, Alone	SLR 039
2001	Christina Rosenvinge	Frozen Pool	SLR 042
2001	John Wolfington	John Wolfington	SLR 043
2001	Chris Lee	Plays & Sings Torch'd Songs...	SLR 045
2004	Christina Rosenvinge	Foreign Land	SLR 050
2006	Michael Powers	Prodigal Son	Baryon 006
2006	Christina Rosenvinge	Continental 62	SLR 053
2007	The Million Dollar Bashers	I'm Not There	Columbia COLB 12038
2007	John Wolfington	American Dreamsicle	SLR 054
2007	Thurston Moore	Trees Outside the Academy	Ecstatic Peace! E#91C
2008	Matt Madly	Checkered	P.O.S. 062808
2008	Christina Rosenvinge	Tu labio superior	Warner Spain 25646 93707
2009	Anna Ternheim	Leaving on a Mayday	Emarcy 06025178719-15
2009	Samara Lubelski	Future Slip	Ecstatic Peace! E#110
2010	D-W/L-SS	D-W/L-SS / JBe	7" Sixgunlover SGL018
2010	The High Confessions	Turning Lead into Gold With the High Confessions	Relapse 7084
2010	Hallogallo 2010	Blinkgurtel / Drone Schlager	7" Vampire Blues VB 01
2010	Circle of Animals	Destroy the Light	Relapse 7104
2011	Israel Nash Gripka	Barn Doors and Concrete Floors	CRS CSCCD1073
2011	Disappears	Live at Echo Canyon	Plus Tapes
2011	Spectre Folk	The Blackest Medicine, Vol. II	Woodsist
2012	Disappears	Pre Language	Kranky
2012	Lee Ranaldo	Between the Times and the Tides	Matador OLE-980
2012	M. Ward	A Wasteland Companion	Merge
2012	Spectre Folk	Ancient Storm	Vampire Blues VB 02
2012	Chris Lee	Bury the Kings	Vampire Blues VB 03
2012	Lee Ranaldo	Between the Times and the Tides: Demos	Lazy8 01
2012	Lee Ranaldo	Between the Times and the Tides: Alternate Mixes	7" Lazy8 02
2012	Lee Ranaldo/J Mascis	"Albatross" Just Tell Me That You Want Me: A Tribute to Fleetwood Mac	Hear Music HRM-33327
2012	Carice van Houten	See You on the Ice	EMI 9782242
2012	Samara Lubelski	Wavelength	De Stijl IND115
2013	Dyveke Kuloy	Gabriel	7"
2013	Howe Gelb	The Coincidentalist	New West Records
2013	Lee Ranaldo and The Dust	Last Night on Earth	Matador OLE-1041
2013	Lee Ranaldo and The Dust	The Rising Tide	Lazy8 03
2013	Lee Ranaldo and The Dust	El Blues De La Revolución	7" El Segell Del Primavera PS006
2014	Sun Kil Moon	Benji	Caldo Verde
2014	Admiral Freebee	The Great Scam	Sony Music 0888430378728
2014	Thurston Moore	The Best Day	Matador OLE-1062
2015	Sun Kil Moon	Universal Themes	Caldo Verde
2016	Kino Kimino	"Bait Is For Sissies"	Ghost Ramp
2017	Sun Kil Moon	Common as Light and Love Are Red Valleys of Blood	Caldo Verde
2017	Cinnamon Tapes	Nabia	Balaclava Records
2017	Thurston Moore	Rock n Roll Consciousness	Caroline
2017	Jessica Lea Mayfield	Sorry is Gone	ATO Records
2018	Riviera Gaz	Connection	Hearts Bleed Blue
2019	Sick Gazelle	Odum	War Crimes Records
2020	Thurston Moore	By the Fire	Daydream Library
2024	Winged Wheel	Big Hotel	12XU
2025	Orcutt Shelley Miller	Orcutt Shelley Miller	Silver Current Records
