= Universal Themes =

Studio album by Sun Kil Moon
- Released: June 2, 2015
- Recorded: 2014–2015; San Francisco and Hoboken
- Genre: Folk rock, indie folk, indie rock, garage rock, spoken word
- Length: 70:10
- Label: Caldo Verde

Sun Kil Moon chronology
Benji (2014)	Universal Themes (2015)	Jesu/Sun Kil Moon (2016)

Mark Kozelek chronology
Mark Kozelek Sings Christmas Carols (2014)	Universal Themes (2015)	Dreams of Childhood (2015)

Universal Themes is the seventh studio album by American indie folk act Sun Kil Moon, released on June 2, 2015, on Caldo Verde Records.

The album was preceded by the singles, "The Possum", "Garden of Lavender" and "Ali/Spinks 2", and features contributions from Sonic Youth drummer and Benji collaborator Steve Shelley. Noting the "spoken segments, garage-rock and pretty acoustic passages", Jon Dennis of The Guardian described the overall sound of the album as "intimate and minimal".

== Reception ==
Professional ratings
Aggregate scores
Source	Rating
AnyDecentMusic?	7.1/10
Metacritic	79/100
Review scores
Source	Rating
AllMusic	4/5 stars
The A.V. Club	A−
Consequence of Sound	A−
The Guardian	3/5 stars
Mojo	4/5 stars
NME	8/10
Pitchfork	6.0/10
Q	4/5 stars
Spin	8/10
Uncut	9/10

Upon its release, Universal Themes received acclaim from music critics. At Metacritic, which assigns a normalized rating out of 100 to reviews from critics, the album currently holds an average score of 79, indicating "generally favorable reviews". Corbin Reiff of The A.V. Club wrote that Universal Themes "lives up to the promise of its vague title", and while Kozelek "keeps the actual events described in the music as personal to himself as they ever been, the experiences and the feelings they evoke are relatable on a hundred different levels." Noting its "increased rawness" in comparison to Sun Kil Moon's previous work, Consequence of Sound's Dan Caffrey called Universal Themes the band's most demanding album, whilst concluding that it "might be one of the most in-the-moment albums ever made". Paul Simpson of AllMusic noted that "like Benji, Universal Themes is a challenging listen, and some might view it as Kozelek's most indulgent album yet," but that Kozelek's "brilliant musicianship and guitar playing combined with his fascinating storytelling skills ensure that his music is as poignant and life-affirming as ever, and the album is yet another success in his remarkable catalog."

While stating that Kozelek's veering "between wry, pissed-off, and ruminative expression without ever really settling on any of those" means that the album "never reaches the same highs as Benji", Jeremy Winograd of Slant Magazine wrote that "it does allow the listener to become fully immersed inside Kozelek's head, which is an alternately terrifying and hilarious place to be." In a mixed assessment, Observer critic Kitty Empire stated that Universal Themes "may test the patience of later adopters". Mark Richardson of Pitchfork stated that Universal Themes is "ultimately a spotty album from a guy who has released a lot of spotty albums."

== Track listing ==
No.	Title	Length
1.	"The Possum"	8:59
2.	"Birds of Flims"	9:04
3.	"With a Sort of Grace I Walked to the Bathroom to Cry"	9:46
4.	"Cry Me a River Williamsburg Sleeve Tattoo Blues"	7:28
5.	"Little Rascals"	7:47
6.	"Garden of Lavender"	10:12
7.	"Ali/Spinks 2"	6:45
8.	"This Is My First Day and I'm Indian and I Work at a Gas Station"	10:09

== Personnel ==
- Mark Kozelek – vocals, guitar, percussion, production, photography
- Steve Shelley – drums
- Alex Schwartz – bass guitar (3)
- Chris Connolly – keyboards (8)
- Nathan Winter – recording
- Aaron Mullan – additional recording
- Jack Kertzman – additional recording
- Will Chason – recording, mixing
- Brian Azer – design

== Charts ==
Chart (2015)	Peak position
Belgian Albums (Ultratop Flanders)	170
Dutch Albums (Album Top 100)	95
Irish Albums (IRMA)	64
UK Albums (OCC)	96
US Americana/Folk Albums (Billboard)	10
US Independent Albums (Billboard)	44
US Top Rock Albums (Billboard)	48
