= The Pacific Ocean (band) =

American indie rock band

- Origin: New York City, U.S.
- Genres: Indie rock, Indie pop
- Years active: 1996–2003
- Labels: TeenBeat, Enchanté
- Members: Connie Lovatt; Edward Baluyut; Steve Pilgrim

The Pacific Ocean was an American indie rock band formed in 1996 and based in New York City.

Edward Baluyut had left Versus in 1996 due to work and family commitments and had played drums for Connie Lovatt's band Containe that year. Shortly afterward, Connie and Edward formed The Pacific Ocean. They released their debut EP Birds don't think they're flying on Enchanté Records that same year with Edward playing both drums and guitar on the album, Lovatt on bass and lead vocals, and Patrick Ramos (his replacement in Versus) playing drums on one track. Several other songs were recorded around this time as well, though they would not be released until 1999.

Drummer Steve Pilgrim joined the group in 1997, and the band played numerous shows in New York City and around the east coast, and toured with both Versus and The Magnetic Fields. In 1999 the band released the full-length Less Than the Needle, More Than the Shotgun, co-produced by Edward's brother James Baluyut. Their third and final album, So Beautiful and Cheap and Warm was released by TeenBeat Records in 2002. This album was produced by Bill Callahan (a.k.a. Smog) under the alias of Johnny Appleseed and featured additional guitar by Alan Licht.

The Pacific Ocean has not played live or recorded since 2003. Connie Lovatt played bass for Smog on the album A River Ain't Too Much to Love (2005) and subsequently toured with Smog. She has since co-authored the cookbook The Dumpling: A Seasonal Guide with Wai Hon Chu.

== Members ==
- Connie Lovatt - vocals, bass
- Edward Baluyut - guitar, vocals, drums
- Steve Pilgrim - drums, keyboards

== Discography ==
- Birds don't think they're flying [mini-album] (1997) Enchanté Records
- Less Than the Needle, More Than the Shotgun (1999) Enchanté Records
- So Beautiful and Cheap and Warm (2002) TeenBeat Records
