= A Perfect Day (EP) =

EP by Lee Ranaldo
- Released: November 1, 1992
- Recorded: Summer 1989 at Two Car Garage Studios, Nuremberg
- Genre: Indie, alternative rock, noise rock, experimental
- Length: 13:29

Lee Ranaldo chronology
From Here to Infinity (1987)	A Perfect Day (1992)	Scriptures of the Golden Eternity (1993)

A Perfect Day is a split EP by Sonic Youth's Lee Ranaldo and the German experimental rock band Something to Burn.

== Track listing ==
1. "Instrumental #2 (Something to Burn)" – 3:10
2. "Deva, Spain: Fragments" – 2:12
3. "A Perfect Day..." – 2:08
4. "For Mr. Chapman" – 5:59
