= Sit Down (EP) =

EP by Run On
- Released: 1997
- Genre: Indie rock, art rock
- Length: 22:38
- Label: Matador

Run On chronology
No Way (1997)	Sit Down (1997)

Professional ratings
Review scores
Source	Rating
Allmusic	3/5 stars

Sit Down is an EP by Run On, released in 1997 through Matador Records.

== Track listing ==
All tracks are written by Run On.

No.	Title	Length
1.	"Owe You"	5:11
2.	"Go There"	7:23
3.	"Xmas Trip"	2:00
4.	"Double Gemini"	8:04
5.	"Half of Half"	4:29

== Personnel ==
- Rick Brown – drums, synthesizer, vocals
- Sue Garner – bass guitar, guitar, piano, vocals, design
- Katie Gentile – violin, organ, vocals
- Alan Licht – guitar
