= Era (Disappears album) =

Studio album by Disappears
- Released: August 26, 2013
- Genre: Rock
- Length: 38:42
- Label: Kranky
- Producer: John Congleton

Disappears chronology
Pre Language (2012)	Era (2013)

Professional ratings
Aggregate scores
Source	Rating
Metacritic	75/100
Review scores
Source	Rating
Consequence of Sound	3.5/5 stars
Drowned in Sound	8/10

Era is the fourth studio album by American rock band Disappears. It was released in August 2013 under Kranky.

== Track listing ==
No.	Title	Length
1.	"Girl"	3:51
2.	"Power"	4:11
3.	"Ultra"	9:33
4.	"Era"	3:46
5.	"Weird House"	4:10
6.	"Elite Typical"	7:52
7.	"New House"	6:39
