= Christina Rosenvinge =

Spanish singer

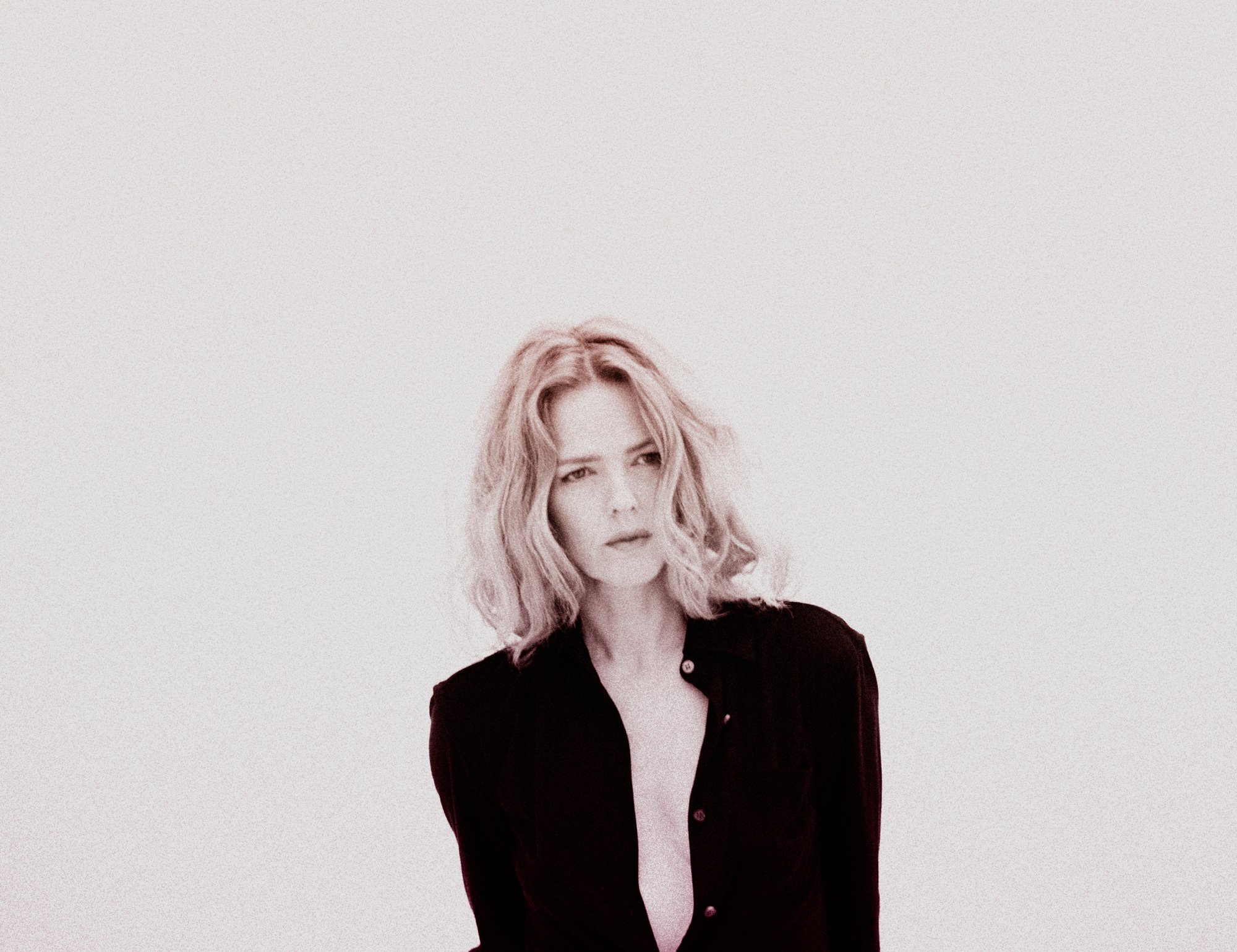
- Rosenvinge in 2015

Background information
- Born: Christina Rosenvinge Hepworth; 29 May 1964 (age 62); Madrid, Spain
- Genres: Alternative rock; indie rock; indie pop; shoegazing
- Occupations: Singer; songwriter; actress
- Years active: 1980–present
- Labels: Smells Like Records; WEA; Segell de Primavera

Christina Rosenvinge Hepworth (born 29 May 1964) is a Spanish singer.

== Career ==
A veteran of the music industry with a career spanning more than thirty years, she was a member of the Spanish groups Alex y Christina and Christina y Los Subterráneos before she started a solo career. Rosenvinge has spoken about facing sexism in the industry and is a vocal critic of it. Lee Ranaldo, the guitarist for Sonic Youth, produced one of her albums before she moved to New York City in 1999. She recorded three albums in English released by Smells Like Records before moving back to Spain. She was considered one of Spain's leading musicians in the 2000s decade. In 2018, she was honoured with the Premio Nacional de las Musicas Actuales.

Rosenvinge tours regularly in Spain, Mexico, and South America. It was in a trip to Huacho, Peru, that she wrote her song "La Tejedora".

== Discography ==
=== With Alex y Christina ===
- Alex y Christina (1987)
- El ángel y el diablo (1989)

=== With Christina y Los Subterráneos ===
- Que me parta un rayo (1992)
- Mi pequeño animal (1994)

=== Solo ===
- Cerrado (1997)
- Flores raras (1998)
- Frozen Pool (16 January 2001) Smells Like Records
- Foreign Land (2002)
- Continental 62 (20 February 2006)
- Alguien que cuide de mí – Grandes éxitos (2007)
- Verano fatal (2007) with Nacho Vegas
- Tu labio superior (2008)
- Tu labio inferior (2008)
- La joven Dolores (2011)
- Un caso sin resolver (2011)
- Lo nuestro (2015)
- Un hombre rubio (2018)
- Los versos sáficos (2023)
