= This Is My Dinner =

Studio album by Sun Kil Moon
- Released: November 1, 2018
- Recorded: 2017
- Length: 1:29:29
- Label: Caldo Verde
- Producer: Mark Kozelek

Sun Kil Moon chronology
Common as Light and Love Are Red Valleys of Blood (2017)	This Is My Dinner (2018)	I Also Want to Die in New Orleans (2019)

Professional ratings
Aggregate scores
Source	Rating
Metacritic	46/100
Review scores
Source	Rating
AllMusic	2.5/5 stars
Exclaim!	7/10
Pitchfork	2.8/10
Under the Radar	6/10

This Is My Dinner is the ninth studio album by American band Sun Kil Moon. It was released in November 2018 under Caldo Verde Records.

== Track listing ==
No.	Title	Length
1.	"This Is Not Possible"	9:12
2.	"This Is My Dinner"	12:36
3.	"Linda Blair"	11:49
4.	"Copenhagen"	10:04
5.	"Candles"	13:40
6.	"David Cassidy"	4:18
7.	"Come On Get Happy"	1:05
8.	"Rock ‘N’ Roll Singer"	6:46
9.	"Soap for Joyful Hands"	13:11
10.	"Chapter 87 of He"	6:48
