= On/Off (Run On EP) =

EP by Run On
- Released: June 6, 1995
- Recorded: Iiwii Studios, Weehawken, New Jersey
- Genre: Indie rock, art rock
- Length: 16:43
- Label: Matador
- Producer: Gene Holder, Run On

Run On chronology
On/Off (1995)	Start Packing (1996)

Professional ratings
Review scores
Source	Rating
Allmusic	3.5/5 stars

On/Off is an EP by Run On, released on June 6, 1995 through Matador Records.

== Track listing ==
All tracks are written by Run On.

No.	Title	Length
1.	"Into the Attic"	2:25
2.	"Switch On"	3:35
3.	"Pretty Note"	4:16
4.	"Water"	1:54
5.	"Beat Out"	4:29

== Personnel ==
Run On

- Rick Brown – drums, synthesizer, piano, vocals
- Sue Garner – guitar, bass guitar, vocals
- Alan Licht – guitar, bass guitar, harmonica, marimba
- David Newgarden – organ

Production and additional personnel

- Greg Calbi – mastering
- Juan Garcia – engineering
- Gene Holder – production, recording
- Matthew J. Minehan – engineering
- Run On – production
- Jon Sowle – engineering
