= Run On (band) =

- Origin: New York City, United States
- Genres: Indie rock, art rock
- Years active: 1993–1998
- Labels: Matador
- Past members: Rick Brown; Sue Garner; Katie Gentile; Alan Licht; David Newgarden

Run On were an American art rock band based in New York City, formed in 1993. The group originally consisted of Rick Brown, Sue Garner and Alan Licht. This line-up recorded the single Days Away and released it on Ajax in 1994. The EP On/Off was issued through Matador in 1995 and according to Licht a vast improvement over the band's previous effort. Newgarden was replaced by Katie Gentile after the release of Run On's debut album. No Way, released in 1997, found the band exploring acid rock and Indian music territories while remaining rooted in classic rock.

== Discography ==
Studio albums

- Start Packing (1996, Matador)
- No Way (1997, Matador)

EPs

- On/Off (1995, Matador)
- Scoot (1997, Sonic Bubblegum)
- Sit Down (1997, Matador)
