= Last Night on Earth (Lee Ranaldo album) =

Studio album by Lee Ranaldo and the Dust
- Released: October 7, 2013
- Recorded: September 2012–June 2013
- Studios: Echo Canyon West, Hoboken, New Jersey
- Genres: Alternative rock, experimental rock
- Length: 63:48
- Label: Matador
- Producers: Lee Ranaldo, Ted Young, Alan Licht, Steve Shelley

Lee Ranaldo and the Dust chronology
| Between the Times and the Tides (2012) | Last Night on Earth (2013) |

Last Night on Earth is the tenth studio album by the American alternative rock musician Lee Ranaldo, released on October 7, 2013 on Matador Records. Recorded over a nine-month period at Echo Canyon West in Hoboken, New Jersey, the album features Ranaldo's backing band The Dust which comprises former Sonic Youth bandmate Steve Shelley, guitarist Alan Licht and bassist Tim Lüntzel. In addition to studio recordings, Last Night on Earth incorporates field recordings of Ranaldo in Berlin, Germany and Valeggio sul Mincio, Italy.

Upon its release, Last Night on Earth received positive reviews from music critics and placed in two international charts, Belgium's Ultratop albums chart and the United States' Billboard Heatseekers Albums chart. Last Night on Earth was further promoted by a 32-date international tour.

== Release ==
Last Night on Earth was announced for release on July 22, 2013 by Matador Records alongside upcoming tour dates in the United States and Canada. Further details of the album were published on August 13 and it was described as "a more intense, expansive work" than Ranaldo's previous album Between the Times and the Tides (2012) and "darker in tone & lyrical content than its immediate predecessor." Last Night on Earth was released on October 7 in the United Kingdom and the following day in the United States on various formats, including CD, LP and as a digital download. An alternate mix of the album track "Late Descent #2" was included as a bonus track with iTunes pre-orders of the album.

In promotion of Last Night on Earth's release, Lee Ranaldo and the Dust commenced a three-leg, 32-date international tour of North America and Europe. The first leg of the band's North American tour began with a performance at Club Helsinki in Hudson, New York on October 8, 2013 and concluded at The Bellhouse in Brooklyn, New York on October 25. On November 10, the European leg commenced in Groningen, Netherlands and concluded in Tours, France on November 26. The final North American leg, consisting of five dates, began in Portland, Oregon on December 6 and ended with a performance at The Echo in Los Angeles, California on December 13. Lee Ranaldo and the Dust had embarked on an eight-date South American tour three months prior to Last Night on Earth's release, which commenced on July 14 in Santiago, Chile and concluded on July 24 in Pompéia, Brazil.

Upon its release, Last Night on Earth placed in record charts in Belgium and the United States. In Belgium, it debuted on Flanders' Ultratop albums chart at number 176 and in the United States, the album peaked at number 44 on Billboard's Heatseekers Albums chart.

== Critical reception ==
Professional ratings
Review scores
| Source | Rating |
|---|---|
| AllMusic | 4/5 stars |
| Consequence of Sound | C+ |
| Cuepoint (Expert Witness) | A− |
| Filter | 71% |
| The Irish Times | 4/5 stars |
| Paste | 7.1/10 |
| Pitchfork | 5.5/10 |
| PopMatters | 5/10 |
| Q | 2/5 stars |
| Uncut | 8/10 |

Last Night on Earth received generally positive reviews from critics. At Metacritic, which assigns a normalized rating out of 100 to reviews from mainstream publications, the album received an average score of 68, based on 18 reviews. In a review for Cuepoint, Robert Christgau said the graceful and occasionally beautiful melodies Ranaldo composed for the album would have been subdued by Sonic Youth's noisy aesthetic, while his singing, still somewhat wordier "than even the alt-rock norm, has turned tender, elegiac, lyrical". Writing for AllMusic, Heather Phares summarized that Lee Ranaldo and the Dust "concentrate on expansive songs filled with shimmering melodies and epic solos" and called Last Night on Earth "an album in the old-school sense, with expansive tracks and detours that still add up to a cohesive whole". Uncut deemed the album "ambitious, mature and noisy." Consequence of Sound reviewer Steven Arroyo said the record "features warm, extended guitar pop tracks". Although criticizing the album's length, Arroyo added that it was "a testament that [Ranaldo] can still create something familiar and comforting, while not lowering the songwriting bar. Even when jamming, The Dust remain expertly dense, never too loose, and never too derivative." Paste reviewer Robert Ham was critical of certain compositional elements of the album but praised Alan Licht's guitar work and said "the loose, free spirit of Last Night is to be expected considering how quickly the songs were written and recorded ... and for the most part, it suits Ranaldo. His lyrics are far more discursive and poetic."

In a mixed review, Colin St. John from Pitchfork criticized the songs' similarities to Sonic Youth and stated "while [the album] has been billed as more of a cohesive band's vision, it still suffers from a similar blurry schizophrenia." Kevin Korber of PopMatters stated that "Last Night on Earth finds a great songwriter capable of much more retreating to comfortable surroundings". Tiny Mix Tapes critic Jeff Milo took note of how the album's songs "spread, shift, transform, and soar—never too waywardly in a 'jammy' sense, but like a showcase of the splendors of each player's instrumental range and talent", adding it is "a highlight of his aptitude for rich and compelling lyrics".

== Track listing ==
All tracks are written by Lee Ranaldo.

| No. | Title | Length |
|---|---|---|
| 1. | "Lecce, Leaving" | 6:55 |
| 2. | "Key/Hole" | 7:04 |
| 3. | "Home Chds" | 7:29 |
| 4. | "The Rising Tide" | 9:09 |
| 5. | "Last Night on Earth" | 4:58 |
| 6. | "By the Window" | 6:57 |
| 7. | "Late Descent #2" | 3:27 |
| 8. | "Ambulancer" | 6:23 |
| 9. | "Blackt Out" | 11:26 |
| Total length: | | 63:48 |

iTunes bonus track
| No. | Title | Length |
|---|---|---|
| 10. | "Late Descent #2" (Dusted Mix) | 3:28 |

== Personnel ==
All personnel credits adapted from Last Night on Earth's album notes.

Lee Ranaldo and the Dust

- Lee Ranaldo – vocals, guitar, vibraphone, bells, production, recording
- Alan Licht – guitar, bells, backing vocals, production
- Tim Lüntzel – bass,
- Steve Shelley – drums, shaker, bells, production

Additional musicians

- John Medeski – organ, piano, electric piano
- Refree – ukulele (5)
- Elina Albach – harpsichord (7), recording (7)
- Sage Ranaldo – backing vocals (9)

Technical personnel

- Ted Young – production, recording, mixing

Technical personnel (continued)

- Aaron Mullan – additional recording
- Bentley Anderson – additional recording
- Elias Gwinn – additional recording
- Tim Glasgow – additional recording
- Johannes Buff – recording (7)
- Greg Calbi – mastering

Design personnel

- Ted Lee – artwork, design, paintings
- Michael Lavine – photography
- Cody Ranaldo – photography, design, technician
- Danielle Petrosa – photography

== Chart positions ==
| Chart (2013) | Peak position |
|---|---|
| Belgian Albums Chart (Flanders) | 176 |
| U.S. Billboard Heatseekers Albums | 44 |
