= Amarillo Ramp (For Robert Smithson) =

Studio album by Lee Ranaldo
- Released: 1998
- Genre: Noise music
- Length: 52:23
- Label: Starlight Furniture

Lee Ranaldo chronology
Dirty Windows (1998)	Amarillo Ramp (For Robert Smithson) (1998)	Countless Centuries Fled Into The Distance Like So Many Storms (2008)

Professional ratings
Review scores
Source	Rating
AllMusic	4/5 stars

Amarillo Ramp (For Robert Smithson) is a studio album by American musician Lee Ranaldo. The album was for Robert Smithson, whose work as an artist was influential on Ranaldo. "Isolation" is a cover of the John Lennon song.

== Track listing ==
1. "Amarillo Ramp (for Robert Smithson)" – 32:20
2. "Non – Site #3" – 6:37
3. "Notebook" – 5:02
4. "Here" – 5:30
5. "Isolation" – 2:54
