= Dreams of Childhood =

Studio album by Mark Kozelek and Nicolás Pauls
- Released: October 27, 2015
- Genre: Spoken word
- Length: 18:37
- Label: Caldo verde

Mark Kozelek and Nicolás Pauls chronology
Universal Themes (2015)	Dreams of Childhood (2015)	Jesu / Sun Kil Moon (2016)

Dreams of Childhood is a spoken word album by American indie folk musician Mark Kozelek and Argentine actor Nicolás Pauls. Executive produced by Pauls, the album features eleven poems written by Argentine street kids, translated by Pauls, Federico Novik, Pablo Cubarle and Catalina Moran. Proceeds from the album will be donated to La Casa de la Cultura de la Calle, an Argentine non-profit organization for homeless children.

== Track listing ==
No.	Title	Length
1.	"Castle"	1:29
2.	"My Love Will Protect You"	1:03
3.	"Dreams Of Childhood"	0:35
4.	"Go To Your Bed"	0:28
5.	"If I Wrote About You I'd Write A Book"	1:32
6.	"Anticipation / Hope"	1:19
7.	"I Dreamed Of My Sister"	0:31
8.	"Close To Me"	0:38
9.	"My Sweetheart"	0:23
10.	"Beautiful Letter Dreams"	0:27
11.	"Cotton Cloud"	0:53
12.	"The Value of Charm"	0:46
13.	"Castillo"	1:08
14.	"Mi Amor te Protegerá"	1:01
15.	"Sueños De Niñez"	0:34
16.	"Andá A La Cama"	0:23
17.	"De Escribir Por Ti Escribiría Un Libro"	1:24
18.	"Esperanza"	1:20
19.	"Sueño Con Mi Hermana"	0:22
20.	"Cerca Mío"	0:27
21.	"Mi Dulce Corazón"	0:22
22.	"Sueño Lindo En Letras"	0:30
23.	"Nube De Algodón"	0:38
24.	"El Valor Del Encanto"	0:24
