= Broken Circle / Spiral Hill EP =

EP by Lee Ranaldo
- Released: 1994
- Recorded: Dec. 1992–1994
- Genre: Alternative rock
- Label: Starlight Furniture Co.

Lee Ranaldo chronology
Scriptures of the Golden Eternity (1993)	Broken Circle / Spiral Hill EP (1994)	East Jesus (1995)

Professional ratings
Review scores
Source	Rating
Allmusic	(not rated, no review) link

Broken Circle / Spiral Hill EP is the second EP by Lee Ranaldo. It was released in 1994, and is Lee's third official release. It was released on the Starlight Furniture Co. as a 7" single (containing just the first two tracks) and as a five track CD-EP. The album is a mix of guitar drone and spoken word pieces, and ending with a Sebadoh cover.

== Track listing ==
1. "Broken Circle" - 3:48
2. "Spiral Hill" - 3:55
3. "Bloomington, Indiana [Early Version]" - 2:34
4. "Midnight Headlights" - 3:46
5. "Brand New Love" - 2:33

== Personnel ==
- Michael Morley – Drawing
- Lee Ranaldo – Guitar
