= Countless Centuries Fled into the Distance Like So Many Storms =

Countless Centuries Fled Into The Distance Like So Many Storms

EP by Lee Ranaldo
- Released: July 22, 2008
- Genre: Experimental, rock
- Length: 10:55
- Label: Table of the Elements

Lee Ranaldo chronology
Amarillo Ramp (For Robert Smithson) (2000)	Countless Centuries Fled Into The Distance Like So Many Storms (2008)

Countless Centuries Fled into the Distance Like So Many Storms is a studio EP by Sonic Youth's Lee Ranaldo. It was released on July 22, 2008. It is a one-sided 12" EP, pressed on light-green vinyl, and housed in a clear PVC-jacket. It consists of five untitled instrumental tracks on the A-side, and an etched picture of a snake-like creature on the B-side. The etching is by Savage Pencil, and is similar to the one on Ranaldo's From Here to Infinity LP.

== Track listing ==
1. "Untitled" - 4:05
2. "Untitled" - 3:28
3. "Untitled" - 1:15
4. "Untitled" - 2:07
