= Clouds (Lee Ranaldo album) =

Studio album by Lee Ranaldo
- Released: 1997
- Genre: Noise music
- Length: 58:13
- Label: Victo
- Producer: Lee Ranaldo

Lee Ranaldo chronology
East Jesus (1995)	Clouds (1997)	Dirty Windows (1999)

Professional ratings
Review scores
Source	Rating
Allmusic	1.5/5 stars

Clouds is an album by Sonic Youth guitarist/vocalist Lee Ranaldo. The album is a reworked recording of the concert performed by Ranaldo & William Hooker at the 1997 edition of the Festival International de Musique Actuelle de Victoriaville.

== Track listing ==
1. "Vast Beings" - 5:57
2. "25 Views Of Florence" - 13:32
3. "New Thought Life" - 3:52
4. "Trees Lie Cut" - 6:41
5. "Junkyard Language" - 3:05
6. "No Apples Fell" - 7:44
7. "Train Wreck" - 5:42
8. "Nothing Was Revealed" - 6:19
9. "Cloud Nine" - 5:21
