= I Also Want to Die in New Orleans =

Studio album by Sun Kil Moon
- Released: March 1, 2019
- Genre: Folk rock, indie folk, spoken word, avant-folk, slowcore
- Length: 89:04
- Label: Caldo Verde Records
- Producer: Mark Kozelek

Sun Kil Moon chronology
| This Is My Dinner (2018) | I Also Want to Die in New Orleans (2019) | Welcome to Sparks, Nevada (2020) |

Professional ratings
Review scores
| Source | Rating |
|---|---|
| AllMusic | 2.5/5 stars |
| Pitchfork | 3.2/10 |

I Also Want to Die in New Orleans is the tenth studio album by American band Sun Kil Moon. It was released in March 2019 under Caldo Verde Records.

The album's title was originally set to be titled Mark Kozelek with Donny McCaslin and Jim White, but after seeing a promotional poster for the 2018 $uicideboy$ album I Want to Die in New Orleans, Kozelek changed the album's title as a response to the hip-hop duo. A CD release of I Also Want to Die in New Orleans was made available on April 12, 2019. To date, I Also Want To Die In New Orleans is unavailable on vinyl, one of the few works of Kozelek not on vinyl.

== Track listing ==
| No. | Title | Length |
|---|---|---|
| 1. | "Coyote" | 12:31 |
| 2. | "Day in America" | 15:07 |
| 3. | "L-48" | 4:51 |
| 4. | "Cows" | 9:58 |
| 5. | "I'm Not Laughing at You" | 11:39 |
| 6. | "Couch Potato" | 11:44 |
| 7. | "Bay of Kotor" | 23:14 |
| Total length: | | 89:04 |
