= East Jesus (album) =

Compilation album by Lee Ranaldo
- Released: May 9, 1995
- Genre: Rock
- Length: 55:37
- Label: Atavistic

Lee Ranaldo chronology
Broken Circle / Spiral Hill EP (1994)	East Jesus (1995)	Clouds (1997)

Professional ratings
Review scores
Source	Rating
AllMusic	4.5/5 stars

East Jesus is a collection of material Lee Ranaldo recorded between 1981 and 1991. It was released on Atavistic Records. Tracks 2, 5, 8 and 10 are pieces that appeared on the CD version of his first LP From Here to Infinity or slight re-edits of that material. The rest of the collection ranges from obscure compilations and 7" releases, or previously unreleased material.

== Track listing ==
1. "The Bridge" – 3:17
2. "Time Stands Still/Destruction Site/Oroboron/Slo Drone" – 10:11
3. "Some Distortion..." – 12:22
4. "Live co # 1" – 8:49
5. "New Groove Loop" – 2:52
6. "Some Hammering..." – 0:33
7. "Walker Groves" – 1:36
8. "Fuzz/Locusts/To Mary X2/Lathe Speaks" – 7:22
9. "Deva, Spain (Fragments)" – 2:03
10. "The Resolution/King's Ogg" – 6:32
