= Start Packing =

Studio album by Run On
- Released: March 12, 1996
- Recorded: Soma, Chicago, Illinois; Funhouse, Barton Boys' Ranch and Greene Street, New York,
- Genre: Indie rock, art rock
- Length: 43:42
- Label: Matador
- Producer: Run On

Run On chronology
On/Off (1995)	Start Packing (1996)	No Way (1997)

Professional ratings
Review scores
Source	Rating
AllMusic	4.5/5 stars
Robert Christgau	(choice cut)
MusicHound Rock: The Essential Album Guide	4.5/5 stars

Start Packing is the debut album by Run On, released in 1996 through Matador Records.

== Critical reception ==
Trouser Press wrote that "the first half is winsomely melodic, while a more abrasively experimental (but still accessible) sonic approach dominates the latter portion." Washington City Paper wrote that the album "bounces from combustible drone ’n’ squall ('Miscalculation') to dusty Velvet melancholy ('Doesn't Anybody Love the Dark') to sexy rhythmic grooves ('Go There')." The Stranger deemed it "some of the most complex and beautiful work of the era." The Chicago Reader called the album "superb," writing that "Sue Garner's sweet, languid, but most of all powerful vocals spin golden threads of melody while Alan Licht's nervy guitar rumbles beneath with purposeful noise and texture."

== Track listing ==
All tracks are written by Run On.

No.	Title	Length
1.	"Tried"	3:27
2.	"Baap"	3:15
3.	"Go There"	4:31
4.	"A to Z"	3:32
5.	"Miscalculation"	1:33
6.	"In Strength"	3:37
7.	"Xmas Trip"	1:56
8.	"Doesn't Anybody Love the Dark"	3:38
9.	"Tell Me"	3:01
10.	"You Said"	4:05
11.	"Coffee"	2:35
12.	"Surprise"	8:32

== Personnel ==
Run On

- Rick Brown – drums, synthesizer, clarinet, vocals, percussion, programming
- Sue Garner – bass guitar, guitar, piano, organ, tambourine, vocals, cover art
- Alan Licht – guitar, bass guitar, piano, accordion, vocals
- David Newgarden – organ, synthesizer, trumpet, tuba, marimba, percussion

Production and additional personnel

- Tony Cenicola – photography
- Rod Hui – mixing, recording
- John McEntire – recording
- Anne McNeil – photography
- Jerry Teel – recording
- Wharton Tiers – mixing
