= Dramamine (disambiguation) =

Dramamine is a brand name of dimenhydrinate.

Dramamine may also refer to:

- Dramamine Less Drowsy Formulation, also called Dramamine II, a brand name of meclizine
- "Dramamine", a song by Modest Mouse from This Is a Long Drive for Someone with Nothing to Think About
- The song was notably covered by Sun Kil Moon on Tiny Cities
- "The Ending of Dramamine", a song by Car Seat Headrest on How to Leave Town
