= Un Hombre Rubio =

2018 studio album by Christina Rosenvinge

Studio album by Christina Rosenvinge
- Released: 9 February 2018
- Recorded: 2017
- Studio: El Lado Izquierdo (Pozuelo de Alarcón, Madrid)
- Label: El Segell del Primavera

Christina Rosenvinge chronology
Lo Nuestro (2015)	Un Hombre Rubio (2018)

Un Hombre Rubio (Spanish for "A Blond Man") is the tenth studio album by Spanish singer Christina Rosenvinge, released on 9 February 2018.

== Background and composition ==
Rosenvinge is known for reinventing herself in new genres from album to album. Beginning while on the last leg of the tour for her electronic album Lo Nuestro (2015), she composed the nine songs that comprised Un Hombre Rubio over four months in early 2016. She took inspiration from childhood idol David Bowie (who died in January 2016) and reconsidering her poor relationship with her father (who died decades earlier when she was 26 years old). The album was recorded in El Lado Izquierdo studio in Pozuelo de Alarcón in the spring of 2017.

The album's lyrics are written from various male points of view (though they can also be read as gender neutral in Spanish), reflecting on the constraints of traditional machismo culture. The first song written for the album, "Romance de la Plata", is a tribute to her father, who loved flamenco; the idea arose after the singer Rocío Márquez commissioned Rosenvinge to write a flamenco ballad. Other songs deal with contemporary social issues: "El Pretendiente" takes the perspective of an African immigrant to Europe; "Berta Multiplicada" is dedicated to the assassinated Honduran activist Berta Cáceres; and "Pesa la Palabra" imagines the El Cordobés singing to his illegitimate son. Musically, the album returns to the rock sound of Rosenvinge's early solo career.

== Critical reception ==
Un Hombre Rubio received positive reviews from Mondo Sonoro and Jenesaispop.

== Track listing ==
No.	Title	Length
1.	"La Flor Entre la Vía"	4:27
2.	"Romance de la Plata"	5:10
3.	"El Pretendiente"	4:35
4.	"Ana y los Pájaros"	5:02
5.	"Pesa la Palabra"	4:23
6.	"Niña Animal"	4:03
7.	"Berta Multiplicada"	4:15
8.	"Afónico"	5:26
9.	"La Piedra Angular"	4:08

== Personnel ==
- Christina Rosenvinge – vocals, piano, guitar, castanets, production
- Manuel Cabezalí – guitar, bass
- Juan Diego Gosálvez – drums
- David Tuya Ginzo – keyboards, guitar, backing vocals
- Dany Richter – production
