= Disappears =

American rock band

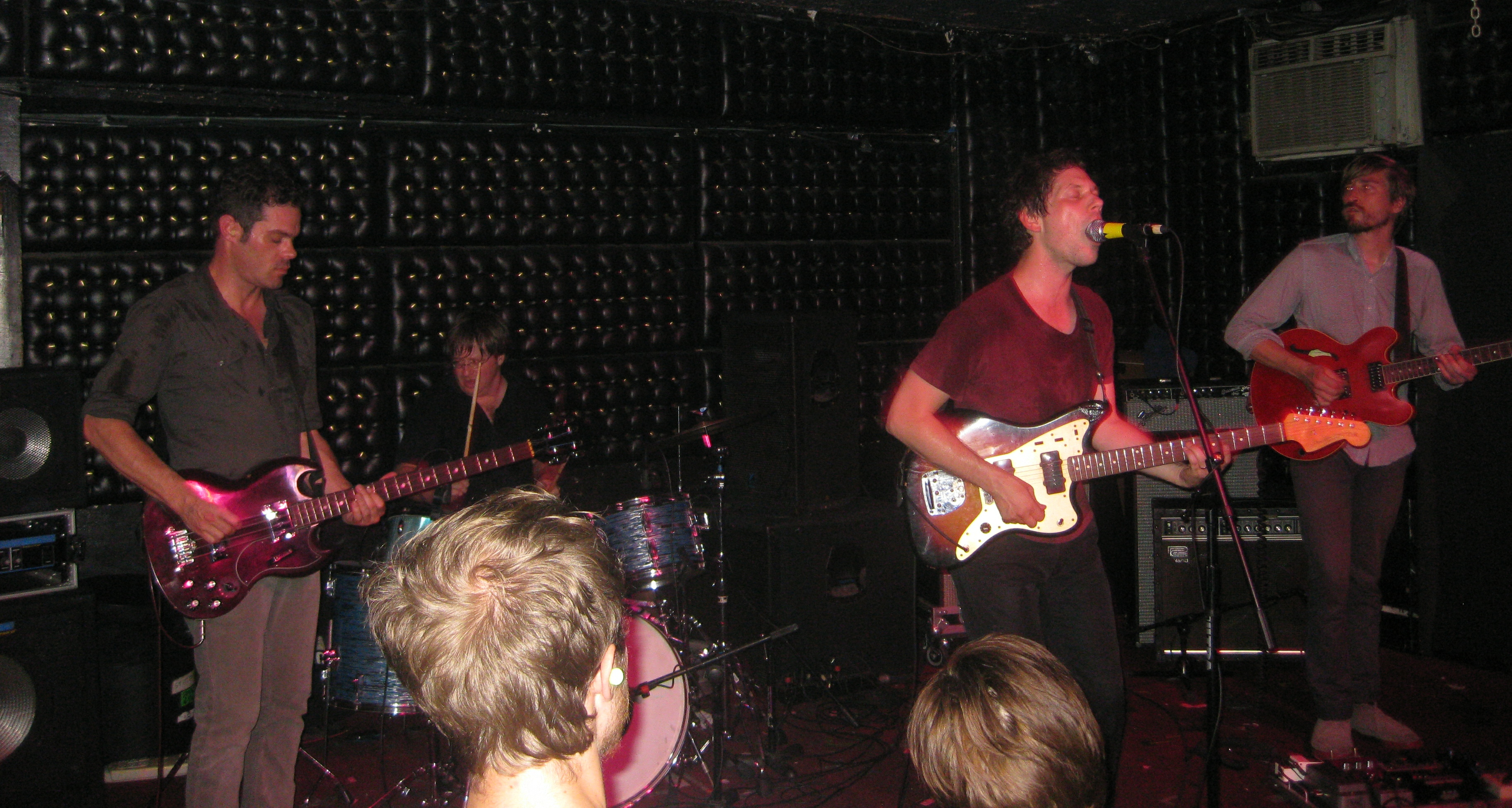
- Disappears in 2011. Left to right: Carruesco, Shelley, Case, and Van Herik

Background information
- Origin: Chicago, Illinois, United States
- Genre: Alternative rock
- Years active: 2008–2016
- Label: Kranky
- Members: Brian Case; Jonathan Van Herik; Damon Carruesco; Noah Leger
- Past members: Graeme Gibson; Steve Shelley
- Website: disappearsmusic.com

Disappears was an American rock band from Chicago, Illinois, United States, which formed in 2008. The band played a mixture of shoegaze, krautrock and garage rock.

The band was formed by Brian Case (ex-90 Day Men, The Ponys) and Graeme Gibson and fleshed out with guitarist Jonathan Van Herik and bassist Damon Carruesco. They played Pitchfork Music Festival in 2009. In 2010 their debut album Lux was released on Kranky. After their second album Guider was released in 2011, Steve Shelley of Sonic Youth joined the band and the band went on tour through the US and Europe.

Shelley left the group in 2012, citing touring scheduling conflicts. He was replaced by Noah Leger (Electric Hawk, Anatomy of Habit).

Disappears have been on hiatus as of the fall of 2016, with Damon Carruesco wanting to focus on his art and design work as well as solo musical project Tüth. The three other members debuted the new band FACS as a three-piece in January 2017.

== Discography ==
- "DIS001", 2008 7"
- "DIS002", 2008 7"
- Live Over the Rainbo
- Lux, 2010, Kranky
- Guider, 2011, Kranky
- Live at Echo Canyon, 2012
- Pre Language, 2012, Kranky
- "A New House in a New Town", 2013 12"
- "Kone", 2013 12"
- Era, 2013, Kranky
- Irreal, 2015, Kranky
