= No Way (album) =

Studio album by Run On
- Released: February 25, 1997
- Recorded: October 1996
- Studio: Idful, Chicago, Illinois
- Genre: Indie rock, art rock
- Length: 46:30
- Label: Matador
- Producer: Run On

Run On chronology
Start Packing (1996)	No Way (1997)	Scoot (1997)

Professional ratings
Review scores
Source	Rating
AllMusic	4/5 stars
The Austin Chronicle	3.5/4 stars
MusicHound Rock: The Essential Album Guide	5/5 stars

No Way is the second album by Run On, released in 1997 through Matador Records.

== Critical reception ==
Tucson Weekly called the album "phenomenal," writing that "Run On delivers avant-garde pop of a ... dark sensibility with a sophisticated, technically educated and carefully orchestrated approach." The Austin Chronicle praised the "lo-fi production, mudfuzz guitar with tom-tom driven Delta rhythms, graveyard violin, and Sue Garner's dusty-road clarion call (hubby Rick Brown and guitarist Alan Licht also sing), all wrapped around hooky pop songs."

Guitar Player wrote that Alan Licht surrounds Garner's vocals "with ominous clouds of droning feedback, supporting the song's melodic flow for two or three verses before unleashing a short, furious storm of groans, squeals and rapid-fire hammer-ons." The Pittsburgh Post-Gazette wrote that the "nine originals [span] the indie-pop spectrum from the impossibly quirky 'As Good As New' to the heartbreaking violin-fueled lament, 'Anything You Say'."

== Track listing ==
All tracks are written by Run On, except "Road" by Nick Drake and "Sinner Man" which is traditional.

No.	Title	Length
1.	"Something Sweet"	2:59
2.	"Lab Rats"	2:40
3.	"As Good as New"	4:36
4.	"Look"	2:33
5.	"Bring Her Blues"	3:21
6.	"Half of Half"	3:42
7.	"Anything You Say"	3:54
8.	"Road"	1:41
9.	"Days Away"	5:15
10.	"Out for a Walk"	3:14
11.	"Ropa Vieja"	3:10
12.	"Sinner Man"	9:25

== Personnel ==
Run On

- Rick Brown – drums, synthesizer, marimba, vocals, programming
- Sue Garner – bass guitar, guitar, piano, vocals, design
- Katie Gentile – violin, organ, cowbell, backing vocals
- Alan Licht – guitar, chord organ, cowbell, vocals

Production and additional personnel

- Hugh Hamrick – painting
- Rod Hui – mixing on "Something Sweet", "Road" and "Sinner Man"
- Brent Lambert – mastering
- Casey Rice – engineering, mixing
