= Common as Light and Love Are Red Valleys of Blood =

Studio album by Sun Kil Moon
- Released: February 17, 2017
- Recorded: August 2016
- Genre: Folk rock; indie folk; spoken word; anti-folk
- Length: 129:48
- Label: Caldo Verde
- Producer: Mark Kozelek

Sun Kil Moon chronology
Jesu/Sun Kil Moon (2016)	Common as Light and Love Are Red Valleys of Blood (2017)	30 Seconds to the Decline of Planet Earth (2017)

Common as Light and Love Are Red Valleys of Blood is the eighth studio album by the American indie folk act Sun Kil Moon, self-produced by primary recording artist Mark Kozelek. The album was released on 17 February 2017 on Caldo Verde Records. It is a double album and comprises 16 tracks in total, being Sun Kil Moon's longest album to date.

== Reception ==
Professional ratings
Aggregate scores
Source	Rating
AnyDecentMusic?	6.6/10
Metacritic	65/100
Review scores
Source	Rating
AllMusic	3.5/5 stars
Consequence of Sound	C
Drowned in Sound	7/10
Exclaim!	5/10
Loud and Quiet	8/10
Paste	7.6/10
Pitchfork	6.5/10
Rolling Stone	3.5/5 stars
State	4/5

Upon its release, Common as Light and Love Are Red Valleys of Blood received positive reviews from music critics. At Metacritic, which assigns a normalized rating out of 100 to reviews from critics, the album currently holds an average score of 65, indicating "generally favorable reviews".

In a positive review for Chorus.fm, Aaron Mook writes, "Common as Light and Love is strange and flawed and beautiful all at once, sometimes all within the span of one eight-minute song," concluding, "regardless of general spottiness, Kozelek is still capable of creating moments of true beauty and unique insight."

== Track listing ==
Disc One
No.	Title	Length
1.	"God Bless Ohio"	10:36
2.	"Chili Lemon Peanuts"	8:58
3.	"Philadelphia Cop"	10:47
4.	"The Highway Song"	7:55
5.	"Lone Star"	9:13
6.	"Window Sash Weights"	6:29
7.	"Sarah Lawrence College Song"	5:13
8.	"Butch Lullaby"	8:33

Disc Two
No.	Title	Length
9.	"Stranger Than Paradise"	12:23
10.	"Early June Blues"	7:16
11.	"Bergen to Trondheim"	7:49
12.	"I Love Portugal"	7:58
13.	"Bastille Day"	5:38
14.	"Vague Rock Song"	7:08
15.	"Seventies TV Show Theme Song"	7:29
16.	"I Love You Forever and Beyond Eternity"	6:13

== Personnel ==
- Mark Kozelek – composer, instrumentation, photography, producer
- Steve Shelley – drums, percussion
- Nick Zubeck – bass guitar, composer, keyboards
- Forrest Day – saxophone
- Will Chason – recording, mixing
- Nathan Winter – engineer, mixing
- Brian Azer – design

== Charts ==
Chart (2017)	Peak position
Belgian Albums (Ultratop Flanders)	157
Belgian Albums (Ultratop Wallonia)	190
