= Jean-Pierre Domingue =

Canadian photographer

- Born: Montreal, Quebec, Canada
- Occupation: Photographer

Jean-Pierre Domingue (born in Montreal) is a French-Canadian photographer. He began his career in fashion photography and publicity at the age of 19. Following this commercial fashion career of 25 years, in 2010 has dedicated his practice to art photography.

== Early years ==
Jean Pierre Domingue was born to parents of Canadian origin with Sicilian, Basque and Mohawk progeny, and has three sons. He found his early inspiration in photography magazines such as Camera and Zoom.

He left Montreal for Paris at age 18 to meet the fashion photographer Guy Bourdin, having discovered his work in the magazine Photo. Following several early fruitless attempts, he finally met him by chance . He became the assistant of Guy Bourdin, and through this position gained experience. During his return to Montreal, from 1981 to 1984 Jean-Pierre Domingue opened his own studio and was published in several magazines, as well as worked in publicity.

== Career ==
After working in a model agency, Jean-Pierre Domingue concentrate entirely on is photography. He opened his own studio, in which all his Paris shoots took place. Partly due to his contacts in fashion magazines and houses, he met with success in fashion photography. He worked with the most prestigious fashion publications including Vogue (France, Espagne), ELLE (Italy, Quebec), Surface, Tank, Depeche Mode, Votre Beauté, and Jardin des Modes in which he did a portrait of Serge Gainsbourg, and photographed fashion models such as Laetitia Casta, Diane Kruger, and more recently Lara Stone, Enikő Mihalik, Jessica Hart. His clients included l'Oréal, Yves Saint Laurent, Dior. He is also artistic director in 2007 of the clip once upon a time of the French group AIR.

Domingue photographed icons of the international rock scene, notably the group Sonic Youth before their concert at La Maroquinerie, and also the actor Jared Leto in 2012.

Domingue decided in 2009 to concentrate on his personal work in image creation. He exhibited in 2012 in his studio, and also showed 100 Polaroids at the gallery Basia Embiricos in Paris, as well as participated in many group exhibitions, including one on his premises. Since 2013, he has traveled to photograph churches in Southern Italy, mummies, catacombs nasturtiums of Palermo, the ruins of Pompeii, Cambodian monks and the temple of Angkor Vat, Hanoi, and the Bay of Hạ Long in Vietnam, and he continues to photograph models and dancers.

In 2011 with his associate and friend Julien Courtois he set up Le Solaris in a 1920 theater where Edith Piaf, Maurice Chevalier performed among others.

He was at the origin of the recreation of the magazine Camera, along with Bruno Bonnabry-Duval and Eric Fantou.

=== Gallery exhibitions/group shows ===
- Galerie Emotion, Photo Off (photo salon), group show, Paris, 2012
- Galerie Basia Embiricos, "100 polaroids", Paris, 2014
