= Lee Ranaldo =

American rock musician

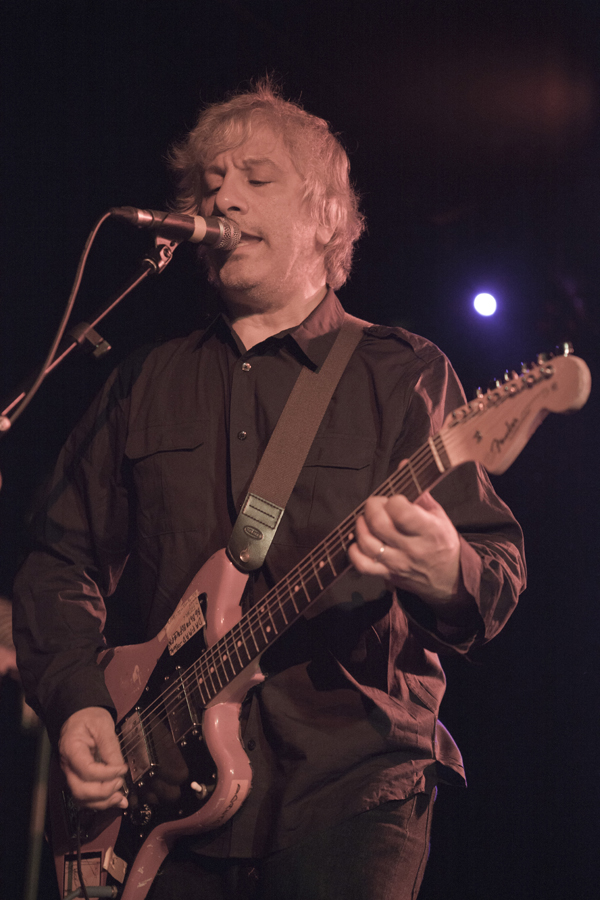
- Lee Ranaldo in 2013

Background information
- Born: Lee Mark Ranaldo; February 3, 1956 (age 70); Glen Cove, New York, U.S.
- Genres: Alternative rock, noise rock, no wave, experimental rock, art rock
- Occupations: Musician, songwriter
- Instruments: Vocals, guitar
- Years active: 1980–present
- Spouse: Leah Singer (m. 1999)
- Website: www.sonicyouth.com/symu/lee/

Lee Mark Ranaldo (born February 3, 1956) is an American musician, singer and songwriter best known as guitarist and vocalist of alternative rock band Sonic Youth. In 2004, Rolling Stone ranked Ranaldo at number 33 on its "Greatest Guitarists of All Time" list. In May 2012, Spin published a staff-selected top 100 guitarist list, ranking Ranaldo and his Sonic Youth bandmate Thurston Moore together at number 1.

== Biography ==
Ranaldo was born in Glen Cove, Long Island, studied art and graduated from Binghamton University. He has three sons, Cody, Sage and Frey, and has been married twice: first to Amanda Linn in 1983 (they later divorced) and later to experimental artist Leah Singer in 1999.

Ranaldo started his career in New York in several bands, including The Flucts, and by playing guitar in Guitar Trio with Rhys Chatham before joining the electric guitar orchestra of Glenn Branca. In Branca's orchestra he played mainly electric guitar, but he also played some of the harmonic guitars Branca designed and built. In 1981, Ranaldo and David Linton briefly joined the band Plus Instruments that had been formed by Truus de Groot. With this line-up they recorded the album February - April 1981, released on the Dutch Kremlin label. After the release of the album, Ranaldo left the band and started Sonic Youth with Thurston Moore and Kim Gordon.

== Solo records during Sonic Youth ==
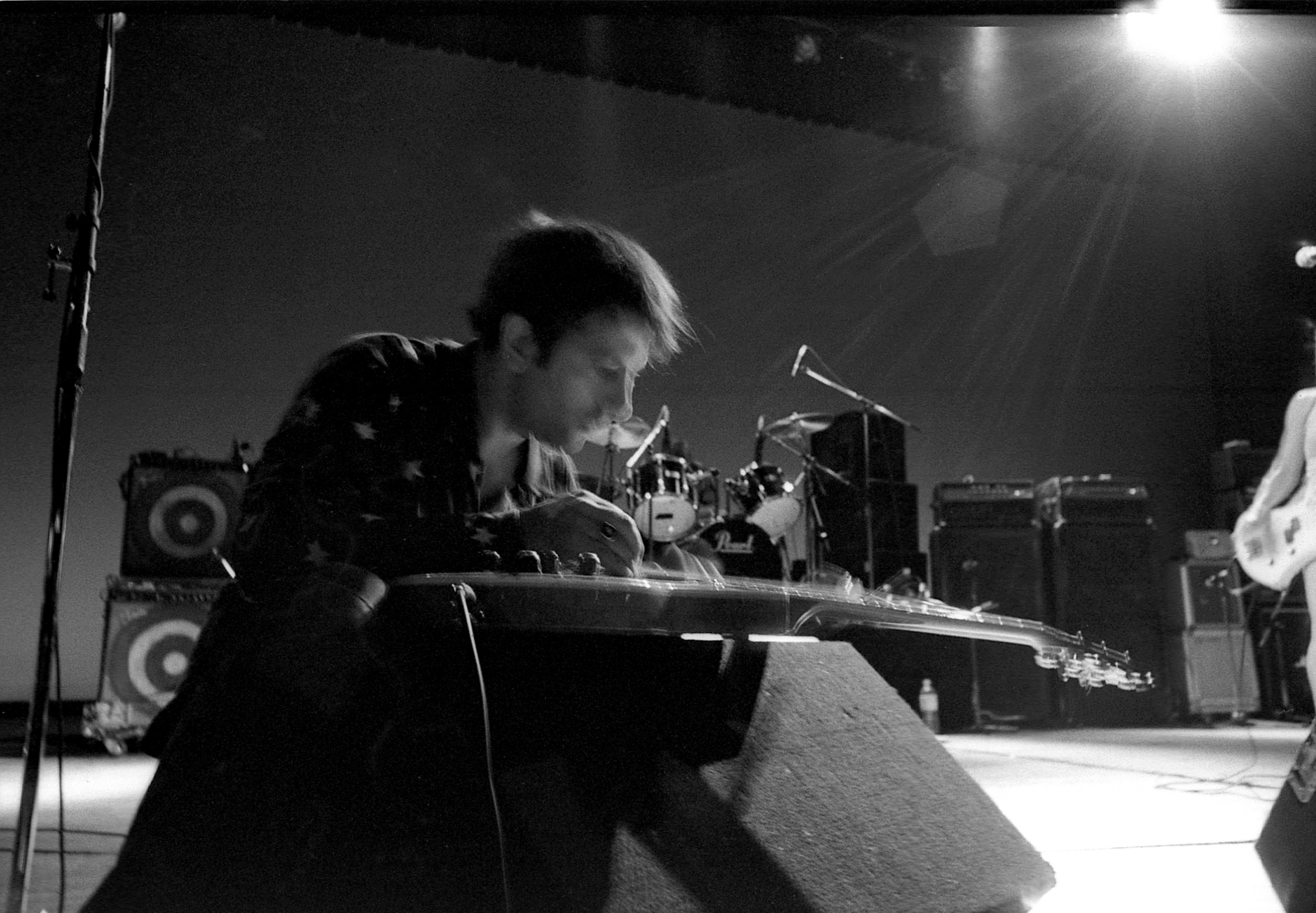
Lee Ranaldo with Sonic Youth in Tokyo, Japan, 1991

In 1987, Ranaldo released his first solo album, From Here to Infinity, compositions which ended in locked grooves. The second side of the album also featured an unplayable engraving by Savage Pencil.

Among Ranaldo's solo records are Dirty Windows, a collection of spoken texts with music, Amarillo Ramp (For Robert Smithson), pieces for the guitar, and Scriptures of the Golden Eternity. His books include several with art or photography by Leah Singer, including Drift, Bookstore, Road Movies, and Moroccan Journal: Jajouka excerpt (from a full-length book of writings on Moroccan travels and music). Ranaldo has also published Jrnls80s (published by Soft Skull Press), as well as a book of poems, Lengths & Breaths, with photography by Cynthia Connolly. His most recent book of poetry, Against Refusing, was published by Water Row Press in April 2010 with cover artwork by Leah Singer. His visual and sound works have been shown at galleries and museums in Paris, Toronto, New York, London, Sydney, Los Angeles, and Vienna.

== After Sonic Youth ==
After Sonic Youth went on hiatus in 2011, Ranaldo released Between the Times and the Tides in early 2012 on Matador Records. The record was the first under his own name to feature comparatively straightforward, vocal pop rock songs. Contributors to the record include Jim O'Rourke, Sonic Youth drummer Steve Shelley, former Sonic Youth drummer Bob Bert, Wilco's Nels Cline, Alan Licht, John Medeski, and bassist Irwin Menken.

Preceded by a 2012 event at Nuit Blanche, on October 21, 2011, The Music Gallery, InterAccess and the Images Festival presented the North American premiere of Ranaldo's Contre Jour, a performance piece for swinging guitar, with visuals by longtime partner and collaborator Leah Singer. This performance was also done in Paris, Rotterdam, during IFFR, and Madrid. In 2012, he performed a solo concert at Parisian music club La Maroquinerie where he was photographed by Jean-Pierre Domingue.

To tour for the album, Ranaldo organized The Dust as his formal group, featuring Licht, Shelley, and bassist Tim Lüntzel. In 2013, his follow-up album Last Night on Earth was released, credited to Lee Ranaldo and the Dust.

In 2014, Ranaldo and the Dust spent one week in Barcelona with producer Raül Refree and cut a full-band, all-acoustic album Acoustic Dust, consisting of songs from Between The Times and the Tides and Last Night On Earth, plus cover songs including Neil Young's Revolution Blues, Sandy Denny's Bushes and Briars, and Mike Nesmith (The Monkee)'s You Just May Be The One.

In September 2017, Ranaldo released Electric Trim, his third proper solo album, made in collaboration with Barcelona Musician/Producer Raül Refree, on Mute records. The album featured 9 songs, many of the lyrics co-written with American author Jonathan Lethem. Musical contributors included Nels Cline, Sharon Van Etten, Alan Licht, Tim Luntzel, Kid Millions and Steve Shelley. A film about the making of the album HELLO HELLO HELLO : LEE RANALDO : ELECTRIC TRIM was directed by Fred Riedel.

Besides working as a guitarist, Ranaldo has frequently produced sound, performance and visual art independently of Sonic Youth. He has released over fifty solo, band and collaborative recordings, and a dozen books; including travel journals, poetry and artists' books. His work has been exhibited at numerous galleries and museums, including the Hayward Gallery in London, the Sydney Museum of Contemporary Art, NSCAD in Halifax, the Kunsthalle Düsseldorf, Mercer Union in Toronto, and Printed Matter, Inc., Artspace and White Columns in New York. In 2017, there was a large overview exhibition in Menen, Belgium about his visual art.

In 2019, he was the curator for a concert series in Fondation Feltrinelli in Milan, Italy, under the umbrella name of Natural Disruptors.

In 2021, Ranaldo released In Virus Times, an EP of solo acoustic guitar pieces recorded during the COVID-19 pandemic.

In May 2024, Ranaldo received the honorary Doctor of Music degree from his alma mater, Binghamton University.

In 2026, Ranaldo released through Doxy Music/Riva Media Records The System, a predominantly guitar-heavy instrumental soundtrack LP based on the sound work Ranaldo recorded for Dutch filmmaker Joris Postema’s documentary film about three climate activists The System.

== Collaborations and side projects ==
Ranaldo has produced albums for artists including Babes in Toyland, You Am I, Magik Markers, Deity Guns, and Dutch art rock-ensemble Kleg. He has edited a volume of tour journals from the 1995 Lollapalooza tour written by himself, Thurston Moore, Beck, Stephen Malkmus, Courtney Love, and others.

Ranaldo has worked with jazz drummer William Hooker on improvised music, and reading and improvising poetry and released several records together.

His main side projects are Drift and Text of Light.

Drift is a duo with his wife Leah Singer, with whom he has performed many live installation pieces with improvised music. The collaboration, utilizing live manipulated 16mm film projections, electric guitar and recited texts, occupied the duo from the early 1990s until late 2005, when they re-created the performance as an art installation at Gigantic Art Space, a gallery in New York City. Since then the pair have been performing a new piece entitled "iloveyouihateyou", a combination installation and performance work that has been presented in the US and Europe. In 2005 Drift released a box set with a DVD and a book.

Text of Light was founded in 2001 by Ranaldo, Alan Licht, Ulrich Krieger, Christian Marclay and William Hooker. The core group is Ranaldo, Licht and Krieger with changing DJs (Marclay, DJ Olive, Marina Rosenfeld) and drummers (Hooker, Tim Barnes, Steve Shelley). The music is free improvised and mostly played along with, but not really referencing, films by Stan Brakhage. The name for the band comes from Brakhage's film The Text of Light.

In 2007 Ranaldo collaborated with British rock band The Cribs on their third album Men's Needs, Women's Needs, Whatever. Ranaldo performs a spoken word piece against the track "Be Safe". Ranaldo made an appearance in the 2008 feature documentary by Nik Sheehan about Brion Gysin and the Dreamachine entitled FLicKer.

Glacial Trio is a band consisting of Ranaldo, Bagpiper David Watson and drummer Tony Buck. In 2010 Ranaldo released the solo album Maelstrom From Drift on Three Lobed Recordings with guest appearances of Buck and Watson. The band released On Jones Beach in 2012.

In 2022 Ranaldo collaborated with Catalan French musician Pascal Comelade and drummer Ramon Prats in a concert inspired by Velvet Underground music for the premiere of Linger On: The Velvet Underground, a book published by Eva and Thurston Moore’s Ecstatic Peace Library by Catalan music journalist Ignasi Julià. The concert was recorded and released as Velvet Serenade.

== Art projects ==
=== Visual works ===
Ranaldo also has had some exhibitions with his visual arts and video works in combination with Sonic Youth-related art (posters, flyers, album covers, etc.). This took place as gallery and museum shows in Porto, Halifax, Miami, Tampa, Vienna, Prague, Gent, Bratislava, Auckland, Salt Lake City and in Brooklyn and at the VOLTA art fair in Manhattan in 2015. Artist-in-Residence: CNEAI, Paris (2007, 2008); NSCAD, Halifax, Nova Scotia (2013); Villa Arson, Nice, France (2014). In October 2017, his first European solo exhibition 'Lost Ideas' by Curator Jan Van Woensel takes place in Cultuurcentrum De Steiger in Menen, Belgium together with a music festival curated by Ranaldo. The festival also features his field recording sound art piece Shibuya Displacement.

=== Sound art ===
In the late 2000s, Ranaldo started giving many sound art performances in the US and Europe with his installation 'Suspended Guitar', which involved a guitar hanging on a rope from the ceiling feedbacking and being played with a bow, or hitting against the body or the strings. In 2006, he made the sound art piece 'Shibuya Displacement (a Soundwalk)' for the Hudson Valley Center For Contemporary Art.

== Equipment ==
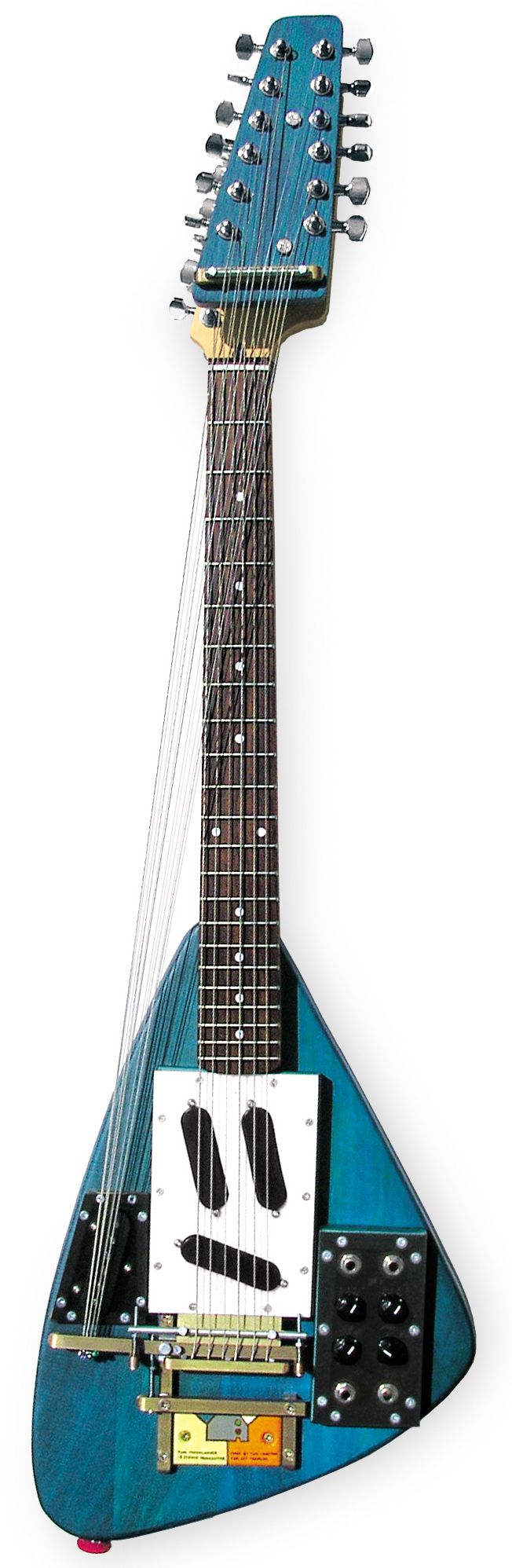
Moonlander guitar.

Ranaldo has used many guitars throughout his career, but is mostly associated with the Fender Jazzmaster, and Telecaster Deluxe models, as well as Gibson Les Pauls sometimes, usually with radically alternative tunings, and modifications. One of his Jazzmasters has a single coil pickup installed between the bridge and the tailpiece to exploit the resonating chiming sounds on that area of string at these so-called tailed bridge guitars. Ranaldo is one of the few popular artists to use the Ovation Viper solid body electric.

In 2007, Yuri Landman built for Ranaldo the Moonlander, a biheaded electric guitar with 18 strings: 6 normal strings and 12 sympathetic strings.

Since Ranaldo and Moore are popularizers of the Fender Jazzmaster, Fender introduced in 2009 a special Lee Ranaldo signature edition of a transparent blue version, together with a transparent green one for Moore.

In 2013, Ranaldo played a Watcher guitar from the French company Custom77 during his last Lee Ranaldo & The Dust tour throughout Europe.

== Printed works ==
- Bookstore and Others (Paperback) - Lee Ranaldo, Leah Singer, Hozomeen Press (April 1995), ISBN 978-1-885175-06-9
- Drift (box set with DVD) - Lee Ranaldo, Leah Singer, Gigantic ArtSpace (2005), ISBN 978-1-933045-34-4
- Ground Zero: New Yorkers Respond (Paperback) - Lee Ranaldo, David Amram, Frank Messina, Wasteland Press (August 15, 2002), ISBN 978-0-9715811-7-3
- Hello from the American Desert (Paperback) - Lee Ranaldo, Curt Kirkwood, Silver Wonder Press (November 2007)
- JRNLS80s (Paperback) - Lee Ranaldo, Soft Skull Press (1998), ISBN 978-1-887128-31-5 (Portuguese edition 2017 by Terreno Estranho)
- Lengths & Breaths (Paperback) - Lee Ranaldo, Cynthia Connolly, Water Row Press (August 2004), ISBN 978-0-934953-79-5
- Moroccan Journal (Hardcover) - Lee Ranaldo, Fringecore (1999), ISBN 978-90-76207-52-0
- Moroccan Journal: Jajouka excerpt (Unknown Binding) - Lee Ranaldo, Leah Singer, Ring Tarigh for the Literary Renaissance (1997), ASIN: B0006RJF80
- Online Diaries: the Lollapalooza '95 tour journals (Paperback) - Beck, Courtney Love, Stephen Malkmus, Thurston Moore, Lee Ranaldo, Mike Watt, David Yow, Soft Skull Press (1996), ISBN 978-1-887128-20-9
- Road Movies (Paperback) - Lee Ranaldo, Leah Singer, Soft Skull Press (November 30, 2004), ISBN 978-1-932360-73-8
- Against Refusing (Hardcover) - Lee Ranaldo, Water Row Press (April 2010), ISBN 978-0-934953-84-9
- Burglarproof Wheelbase
- Water Days (w/ Leah Singer) (also in French published by Dis Voir under the title 'Jours D'eau')
- IloveyouIhateyou (w/ Leah Singer), (Magasin3 catalog)
- Some Writings on Music and Musicians, self-published, 2017
- How not to get played on the Radio, SoundBarn press December 2012, 22 poems

== Discography ==
Solo albums

- From Here to Infinity (1987)
- Scriptures of the Golden Eternity (1993) (Recorded 1988–1989)
- Dirty Windows (1998) (Recorded 1991–95)
- Amarillo Ramp (For Robert Smithson) (1998) (Recorded 1990–95)
- Outside My Window The City Is Never Silent - A Bestiary (2002) (Recorded 1991–95)
- Music For Stage And Screen (2004)
- Ambient Loop For Vancouver (2006)
- Maelstrom From Drift (2008)
- Between the Times and the Tides (Matador Records, 2012)
- Last Night on Earth (with the Dust) (2013)
- Acoustic Dust (with the Dust) (2014)
- Electric Trim (2017)
- Electric Trim Live at Rough Trade East (2018)
- Names of North End Women (with Raul Refree) (2020)
- The System (Original Film Music) (2025)

Singles and EPs

- A Perfect Day EP (1992)
- Broken Circle / Spiral Hill EP (1994)
- Countless Centuries Fled into the Distance Like So Many Storms (2008)
- In Virus Times (2021)

Compilations

- East Jesus (1995)

Collaborations with William Hooker

- Envisioning (1995)
- The Gift of Tongues (also with Zeena Parkins) (1995)
- Clouds (1997)
- Bouquet [also with Christian Marclay] (2000)
- Out Trios Volume One: Monsoon (also with Roger Miller) (2003)
- Oasis of Whispers (also with Glen Hall) (2005)
- The Celestial Answer (2005)

Collaborations with others

- cover of Pink Floyd's "Money" on Martin Bisi's Creole Mass LP (1988)
- MMMR (also with Loren Mazzacane Connors, Jean-Marc Montera & Thurston Moore) (1997)
- New York - Ystad (with Thurston Moore, Steve Shelley, Mats Gustafsson) (2000)
- New Life After Fire (For Tom Thomson) (With Dave Dyment) (2003)
- Four Guitars Live (Ranaldo / Giffoni / Moore / Cline (2006)
- Les Anges Du Péché [Jean-Marc Montera / Thurston Moore / Lee Ranaldo] (2011)
- Trouble and Desire (The Callas with Lee Ranaldo) (2018)
- Ranaldo Jarmusch Urselli Pandi (Lee Ranaldo / Jim Jarmusch / Marc Urselli / Balazs Pandi) (2019)
- Churning of the Ocean (Lee Ranaldo / Jim Jarmusch / Marc Urselli / Balazs Pandi) (2021)
- Velvet Serenade (Pascal Comelade, Ramon Prats, Lee Ranaldo) (2023)
- Hell Gate (Wild Classical Music Ensemble with Lee Ranaldo) (2023)
- Split Release with Rob Menard (cassette/digital, 2024)

Live recordings

- Fuck Shit Up (with Thurston Moore & Christian Marclay) (2000) [Live]
- Text of Light (a band which included Alan Licht, Christian Marclay, Tim Barnes, Ulrich Krieger, William Hooker) (2004)

As a band member

See discography for Sonic Youth discography

- Glacial (Lee Ranaldo, David Watson & Tony Buck) - On Jones Beach, LP, (2012) Insound
- Afternoon Saints
- Text of Light
- Plus Instruments - February - April 1981, Kremlin records, 1981
