= Frozen Pool =

2001 album by Christina Rosenvinge

Studio album by Christina Rosenvinge
- Released: January 16, 2001
- Label: Smells Like Records

Christina Rosenvinge chronology
Flores raras (1998)	Frozen Pool (2001)	Foreign Land (2002)

Frozen Pool is an album by Christina Rosenvinge. It was released on January 16, 2001 on Smells Like Records.

== Track listing ==
1. "Hunter's Lullaby"
2. "Expensive Shoes"
3. "White Ape"
4. "Frozen Pool"
5. "Taking Off"
6. "Muertos o algo Mejor"
7. "As the Wind Blows"
8. "Green Room"
9. "Glue"
10. "Seems So Long Ago, Nancy"
