= From Here to Infinity (album) =

Studio album by Lee Ranaldo
- Released: 1987 (vinyl); 1988 (compact disc)
- Recorded: 1983–1987, New York City and Nottingham, England
- Genre: Noise music
- Length: 29:50 (CD version); 12:14 (LP version)
- Label: US: SST (113); UK: Blast First
- Producer: Lee Ranaldo

Lee Ranaldo chronology
From Here to Infinity (1987)	A Perfect Day EP (1992)

Professional ratings
Review scores
Source	Rating
Allmusic	1.5/5 stars

From Here to Infinity (rendered on the cover and label art as From Here → Infinity) is the first solo album by the Sonic Youth guitarist/songwriter Lee Ranaldo. The album consists of several compositions performed by Ranaldo with guitar, amplifier feedback, and guitar stompbox effects recorded onto extended tape loops.

== Album history ==
The album was originally released by SST Records on lock groove vinyl, which allowed the listener to listen to the remaining few seconds of each composition for as long as they desired. On the original vinyl recording, Ranaldo created a few of the tracks directly in the mastering studio where the cutting of the original vinyl version took place. In addition to the locked grooves, the LP was mastered at 45 RPM (although the vinyl's record label also gave a "varispeed" designation, suggesting that the record could be enjoyed at any speed) and also contained on the album's second side an engraving of the serpent designed by Savage Pencil, which was given its own track number, title, and facetious "infinity" track length.

The spontaneous insertion of recordings during the vinyl cutting stage proved to be both a blessing and a minor setback when it came time for the compact disc edition of the album to be created, according to Ranaldo's sleeve note on the CD edition; Ranaldo utilized a combination of the original master tapes, and recordings taken directly from a vinyl copy of the album to reproduce the tracks that Ranaldo had done in the mastering studio. Ranaldo also extended the length of many of the tracks, and cut new tape loops based on the original recordings "to replace certain lock grooves" that the artist "wasn't altogether happy with" on the original record. The utilization of some transfers from a vinyl copy inspired Ranaldo to boast on the bottom of the sleeve note that the CD edition of From Here to Infinity was "the only compact disc with surface noise".

The album reached No. 20 in the UK Indie Chart, spending six weeks on the chart.

The title was taken out of print after a business dispute between Sonic Youth and SST led to the deletion of all Sonic Youth titles from the SST catalog, although the title did remain on SST catalog inserts for a few years afterward; as of the spring of 2007, no new edition of From Here to Infinity is planned, although used/leftover copies of the CD trade for an average of $14 to $28 on such sites as Half.com.

== Track listing ==
=== Original vinyl edition ===
==== Side one ====
1. "Time Stands Still" – 2:40
2. "Destruction Site" – 1:17
3. "Ouroboron" – 0:46
4. "Slo Drone" – 1:10
5. "New Groove Loop" – 0:48
6. "Florida Flower" – 0:40
7. "Hard Left" – 0:18

==== Side two ====
1. "Fuzz/Locusts" – 1:04
2. "To Mary" – 0:40
3. "Lathe Speaks" – 1:39
4. "The Resolution" – 0:48
5. "Sav X" – ∞
  - This track is actually an etching of Savage Pencil's dragon from the front cover.
6. "The Open End" – 0:24

=== Compact disc edition ===
1. "Time Stands Still" – 3:51
2. "Destruction Site" – 2:17
3. "Ouroboron" – 1:41
4. "Slo Drone" – 2:25
5. "New Groove Loop" – 2:50
6. "Florida Flower" – 1:05
7. "Hard Left" – 1:43
8. "Fuzz/Locusts" – 2:06
9. "To Mary (X2)" – 3:26
10. "Lathe Speaks" – 1:58
11. "The Resolution" – 2:13
12. "King's Ogg" – 4:15
  - Savage Pencil's dragon etching (aka the "track" "Sav X" from side two of the vinyl) is reproduced on the CD's silkscreened label.
