= Garage (rock club) =

Rock club in Bergen and Oslo, Norway

Garage was a bar that opened in 1990 in Bergen, Norway, with a branch established 2004 in Oslo. Both of the bars also have their own concert departments. The Bergen branch of Garage was created by Frode Svanevik together with veterans at the rock scene of Bergen, and quickly became one of the city's most popular venues, especially among students. Because of municipal rules on opening hours the bar was divided into two separate departments with different opening hours for several years. Garage is one of the most renowned rock clubs in Northern Europe.

As one of the most popular night clubs in Bergen, Garage was a hub for music interested people. The Oslo Department premises previously belonged to rock club "So What". Garage then took over, with Henning Christensen as manager in 2001, in collaboration with the Oslo club "Café Mono. This location, in addition to being a bar and concert venue, also had outdoor seating. Both departments are adorned with statuettes that had been provided by various Spellemannpris Winners from their respective cities.

The bar went out of business in 2018.
