= Alan Licht =

American guitarist (born 1968)

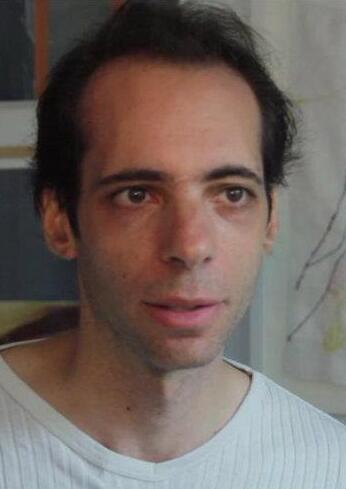

Background information
- Born: June 6, 1968 (age 58); New Jersey, U.S.
- Genres: Avant-garde, noise rock, pop
- Instrument: Guitar
- Years active: 1991-current

Alan Arthur Licht (born June 6, 1968) is an American guitarist and composer, whose work combines elements of pop, noise, free jazz and minimalism. He is also a writer and journalist.

== Biography ==
Licht was born in New Jersey in 1968. His earliest musical influences, in the 1970s, were mainstream rock bands like the Bee Gees and Wings—he remarks in an interview with Paris Transatlantic magazine that 'What made me want to play guitar was that painting of Wings in concert in the gatefold of Wings Over America. It looked so exciting... I wanted to be part of it.' Later, in school, he listened to punk and no wave bands like Mission of Burma, Hüsker Dü and Sonic Youth. However, his musical trajectory was set when his guitar teacher gave him a copy of Steve Reich's Music for 18 Musicians, which would lead to his discovery of other minimalist music. Licht majored in Film Studies at Vassar College in New York. Since the 1980s, he has worked and recorded with the bands Love Child, Run On and The Pacific Ocean and with other avant-garde musicians including Jim O'Rourke, Rudolph Grey, and Loren Mazzacane Connors. He has also recorded several solo albums. Licht participated as drummer 42 in the Boredoms 77 Boadrum performance which occurred on July 7, 2007, at the Empire-Fulton Ferry State Park in Brooklyn, New York.

== Musical style ==
Licht's music draws on a wide range of different styles, from tape-loops, to noisy guitar (sometimes using a prepared instrument), to pure pop music.

== Writing ==
Licht is also a music journalist and writer on minimalist music, and in 2000, he published his first book, An Emotional Memoir of Martha Quinn. In 2007 Rizzoli published his book Sound Art: Beyond Music, Between Categories. In 2021 his book Common Tones: Selected Interviews with Artists and Musicians 1995-2020 was published by Blank Forms Edition.

== Discography ==
=== Solo ===
- Sink the Aging Process (Siltbreeze 1994)
- The Evan Dando of Noise (Corpus Hermeticum 1997)
- Rabbi Sky (Siltbreeze 1999)
- Plays Well (Crank Automotive 2000)
- A New York MInute (XI 2003)
- YMCA (Family Vineyard 2009)
- Four Years Older (Editions Mego 2013)

=== with The Blue Humans ===
- Clear to Higher Time (New Alliance 1992)

=== with Jandek ===
- Glasgow Sunday 2005 (Corwood Industries 2008) (Uncredited on 'Tribal Ether')

=== with Loren Mazzacane Connors ===
- Live In NYC (New World of Sound 1996)
- Two Nights (Road Cone Records 1996)
- Mercury (Road Cone Records 1997)
- Hoffman Estates (Drag City 1998)
- In France (FBWL 2003)

=== with Love Child ===
- Okay? (Homestead 1991)
- Witchcraft (Homestead 1992)

=== with Run On ===
- On/Off (Matador 1995)
- Start Packing (Matador 1996)
- No Way (Matador 1997)

=== with The Pacific Ocean ===
- So Beautiful and Cheap and Warm (TeenBeat Records 2002)

=== with Aki Onda ===
- Everydays (Family Vineyard 2008)

=== with Lee Ranaldo and the Dust ===
- Last Night on Earth (Matador 2013)

== Bibliography ==
- Cheslow, Sharon (2008). Interrobang?! Anthology on Music and Family: Writings and Interviews. contributions by Alan Licht, Sharon Cheslow, others. San Francisco: Decomposition. ISBN 978-0-9818706-6-3.
- Licht, Alan (2007). Sound Art: Beyond Music, Between Categories. introduction by Jim O'Rourke. New York: Rizzoli. ISBN 978-0-8478-2969-9.
- Lesser, Tom; Alan Licht; Roland Spekle; Lee Ranaldo; Leah Singer; Sam Durant; Jonas Mekas (2006). Lee Ranaldo & Leah Singer: Drift. Lea Rekow (contributor). New York: Plexifilm. ISBN 1-933045-34-5.
- Marclay, Christian; Douglas Kahn; Miwon Kwon; Alan Licht (2003). Christian Marclay. edited by Russell Ferguson. Los Angeles: Steidl Publishing. ISBN 3-88243-931-9.
- Licht, Alan (2000). An Emotional Memoir of Martha Quinn. Chicago: Drag City. ISBN 0-9656183-3-1.
