= Answering machine (disambiguation) =

An answering machine is a device for automatically answering telephone calls and recording messages left by callers.

Answering Machine may also refer to:

== Music ==
=== Artists ===
- The Answering Machine, a British indie band from Manchester

=== Albums ===
- The Answer Machine?, by British folk metal band Skyclad
- Answering Machine Music (1999), by Casiotone for the Painfully Alone

=== Songs ===
- "Answering Machine", by The Replacements from the 1984 album Let It Be
- "The Answering Machine", by Marillion from the 1998 album Radiation
- "Answering Machine", by Cherry Poppin' Daddies from the 1990 album Ferociously Stoned
- "Answering Machine", by Rupert Holmes
- "Answerphone" (Nicholas McDonald song)
- "Answerphone" (Banx & Ranx and Ella Eyre song)
- "Answerphone", by David Long, performed by the Mutton Birds
- "Ansaphone", performed by Pulp from the single "Disco 2000"

== Other uses ==
- Question answering machine
