= Pocket symphony =

Song with extended form

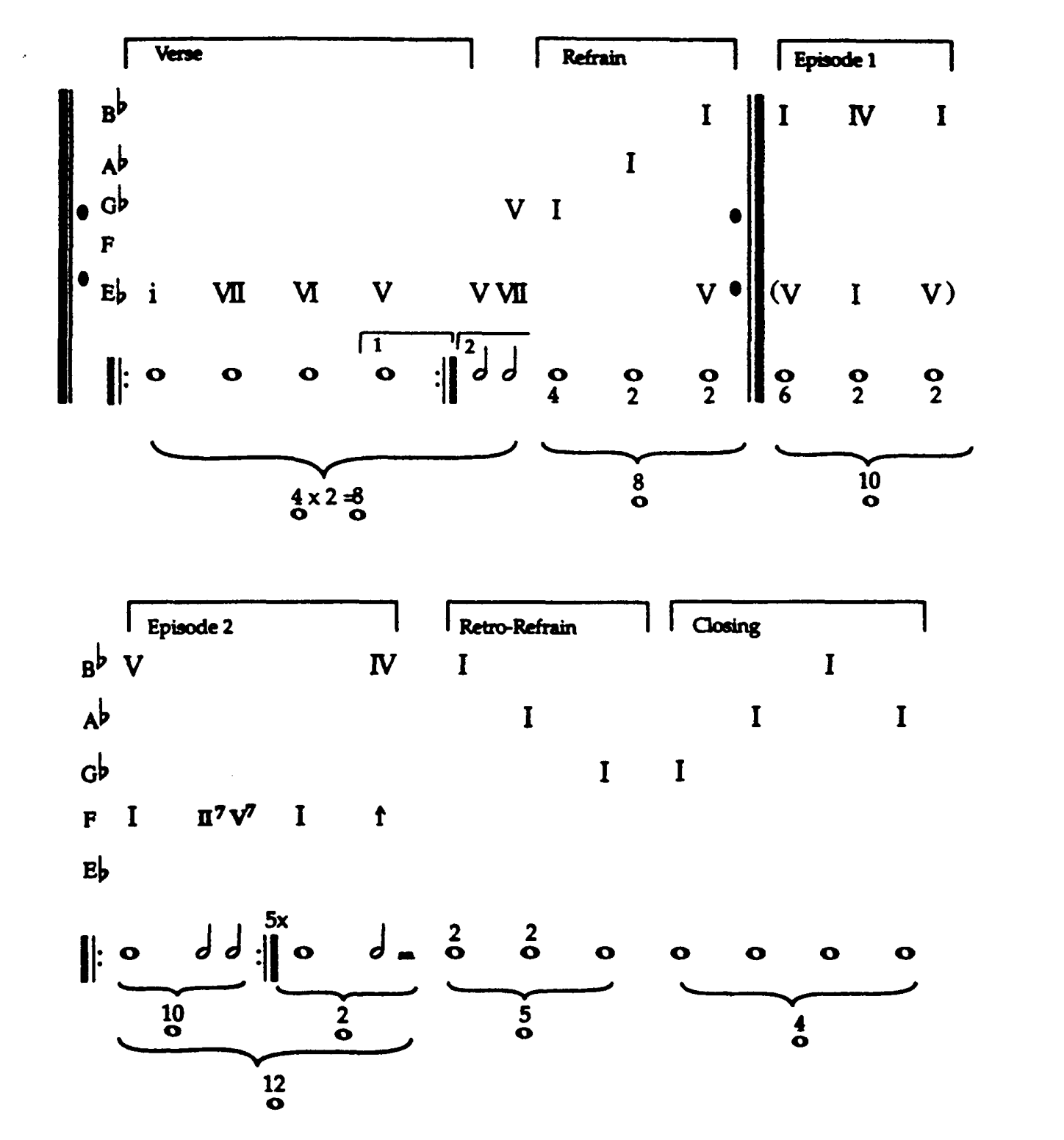
A visual representation of the structure to "Good Vibrations" (1966). It shows how the song develops without the guidance of overdetermined formal patterns.

A pocket symphony is a song with extended form. The term was popularized by English journalist Derek Taylor, who used it to describe the Beach Boys' 1966 single "Good Vibrations". (The description of a "pocket" symphony had appeared in print since as early as 1928.)

== Attributions ==
=== Popular music ===
- The Beach Boys - "Good Vibrations" (1966)
- The Beatles – "A Day in the Life" (1967)
- T. Rex – "Telegram Sam" (1971)
- Serge Gainsbourg – Histoire de Melody Nelson (1971)
- Paul McCartney & Wings – "Band on the Run" (1973)
- Queen – "Bohemian Rhapsody" (1975)
- Radiohead - "Paranoid Android" (1997)
- My Chemical Romance - "Welcome to the Black Parade" (2006)
- Weezer - "The Greatest Man That Ever Lived (Variations on a Shaker Hymn)" (2008)

=== Classical compositions ===
- Wolfgang Amadeus Mozart – Eine kleine Nachtmusik
- Havergal Brian – Symphony No. 12

== See also ==
- Pocket Symphonies
- Pocket Symphonies for Lonesome Subway Cars
