= Dune Forest Village =

Coordinates: 43°40′22″N 86°31′23″W

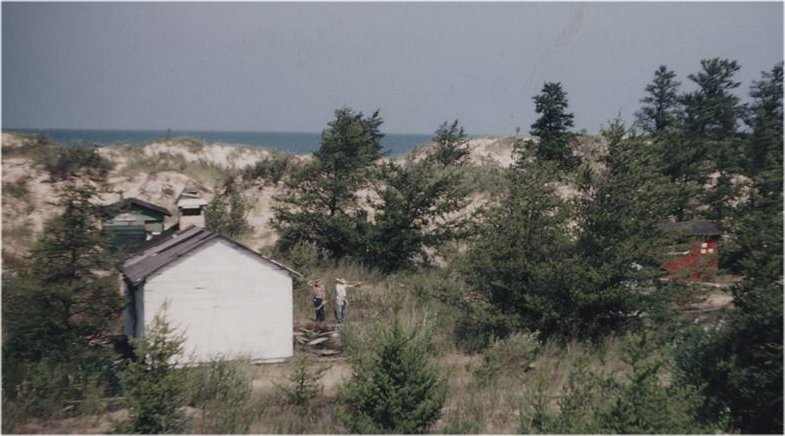
Swift Lathers' Dune Forest Village at Silver Lake State Park

Dune Forest Village was an "island" retreat of Swift Lathers the publisher of the Michigan newspaper The Mears Newz. It was constructed between 1939 and 1957 for the purpose of having a place to go to for a simple life away from a cosmopolitan lifestyle. It was finally removed in the 1970s to make way for a state park.

== Description ==
Dune Forest Village was an "island" retreat not surrounded by water, but by the sand dunes of the Lower Peninsula of Michigan in the United States. It consisted of a set of several small custom-made summer cabins and buildings at a homesteaded property in Michigan. The village consisted not only of summer resident dwellings, but also had a schoolhouse, church, general store, restaurant, and printing office. The little red schoolhouse had desks and books ready for class lessons; the church had an organ for music for the churchgoer worshipers, and the general store had 25 post office boxes. There was also a small restaurant boutique and a print shop office. The buildings were small but functional and used from time to time. One Sunday there were 32 people from Grand Rapids, Michigan that attended church services in the village chapel.

== Background ==
Lathers had homesteaded a tract of land of some 60 acres (24 ha) on the shores of Lake Michigan in Western Michigan near Hart. Here he developed a small village as a retreat for himself and guests. The group of buildings constructed by Lathers was called Dunes Forest Village because there were trees in the area. The boards and construction material for his village were transported by Lathers by hand, as these was no public access to the remote area. He dragged the lumber and material for construction across the dunes.

Lathers, considered a romanticist, envisioned his own island where he could go to for peace and quiet away from the hustle and bustle of the real world. He made his "island" in the sand dunes on the shores of Lake Michigan at the village of Mears near Hart. Lathers started construction of his small buildings in 1939. Lathers had a vision of a simple lifestyle and continued to work on building the village until 1957.

== Works related to the village ==
- Gardener of the Dunes (1929)—Lathers wrote of a simple lifestyle that he ultimately developed in the dunes of the ideal village for peace of mind.
- Village in the Dunes (1942)—Lathers wrote on his family's life at the dunes village.

== Demise ==
The village buildings of Dune Forest deteriorated over a twenty-year period of time and were vandalized. The dunes area became the Silver Lake State Park in the 1970s and state park management removed what was left of the buildings.

== Gallery ==
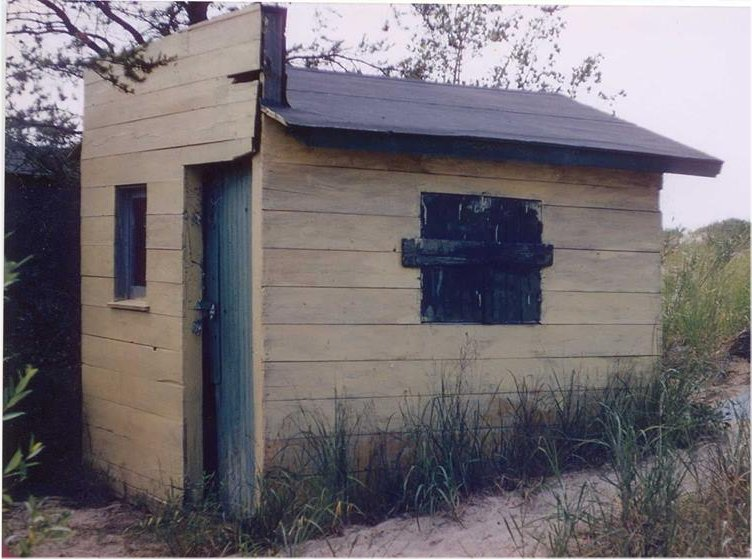
General Store

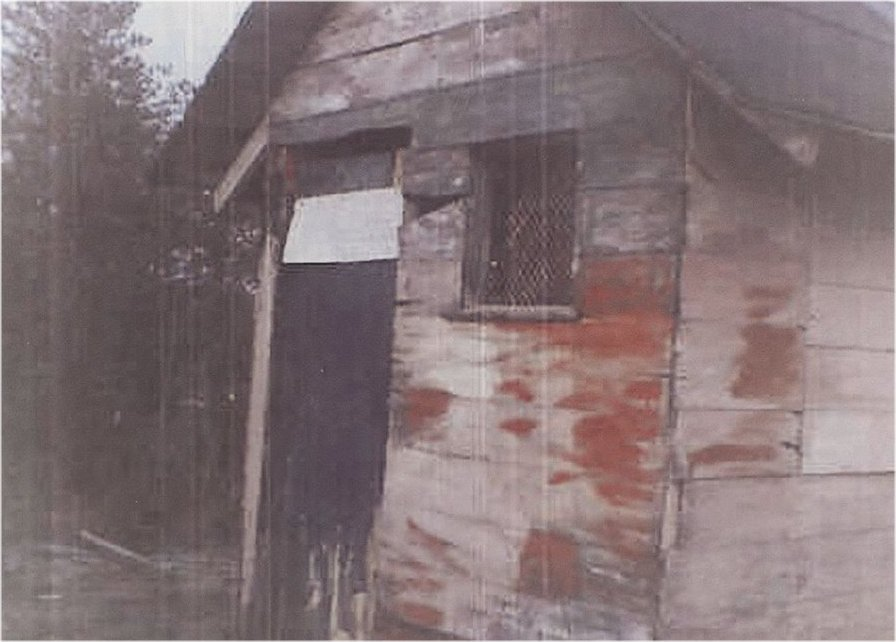
Jail

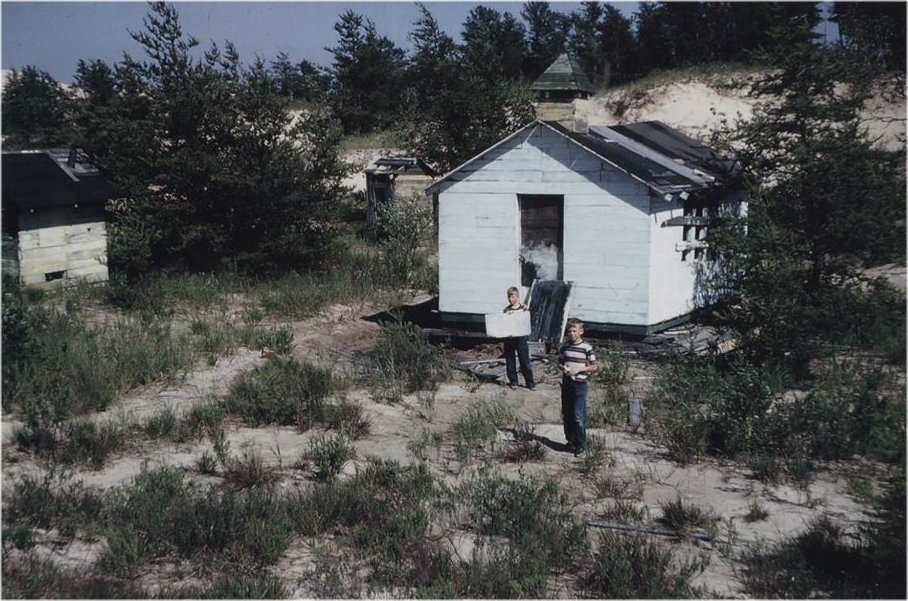
Church

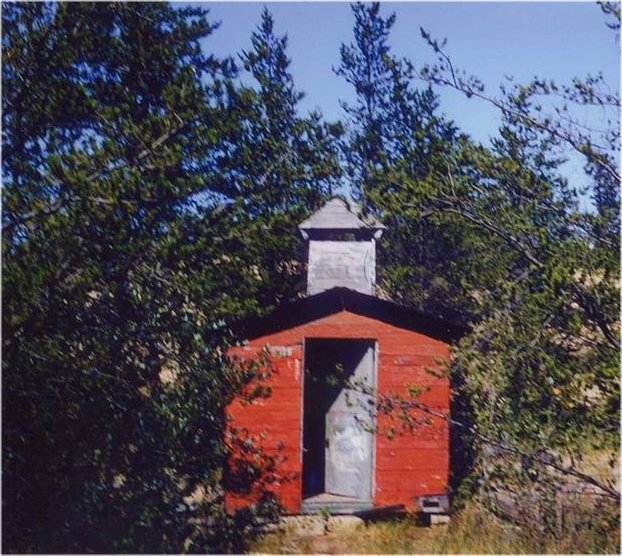
School House
