= Etiquette (disambiguation) =

Etiquette refers to shared cultural norms governing individual behavior.

Etiquette may also refer to:

== Arts, entertainment, and media ==
- Etiquette (Casiotone for the Painfully Alone album), 2006
- Etiquette (Something with Numbers album), 2004
- Etiquette, one of the Bab Ballads by W. S. Gilbert
- Etiquette in Society, in Business, in Politics, and at Home, a 1922 book by Emily Post

== Other uses ==
- Etiquette (technology), online etiquette
- Etiquette, labels applied to postal items, such as airmail etiquette
