= Casiotone for the Painfully Alone =

Musical solo-project by Owen Ashworth

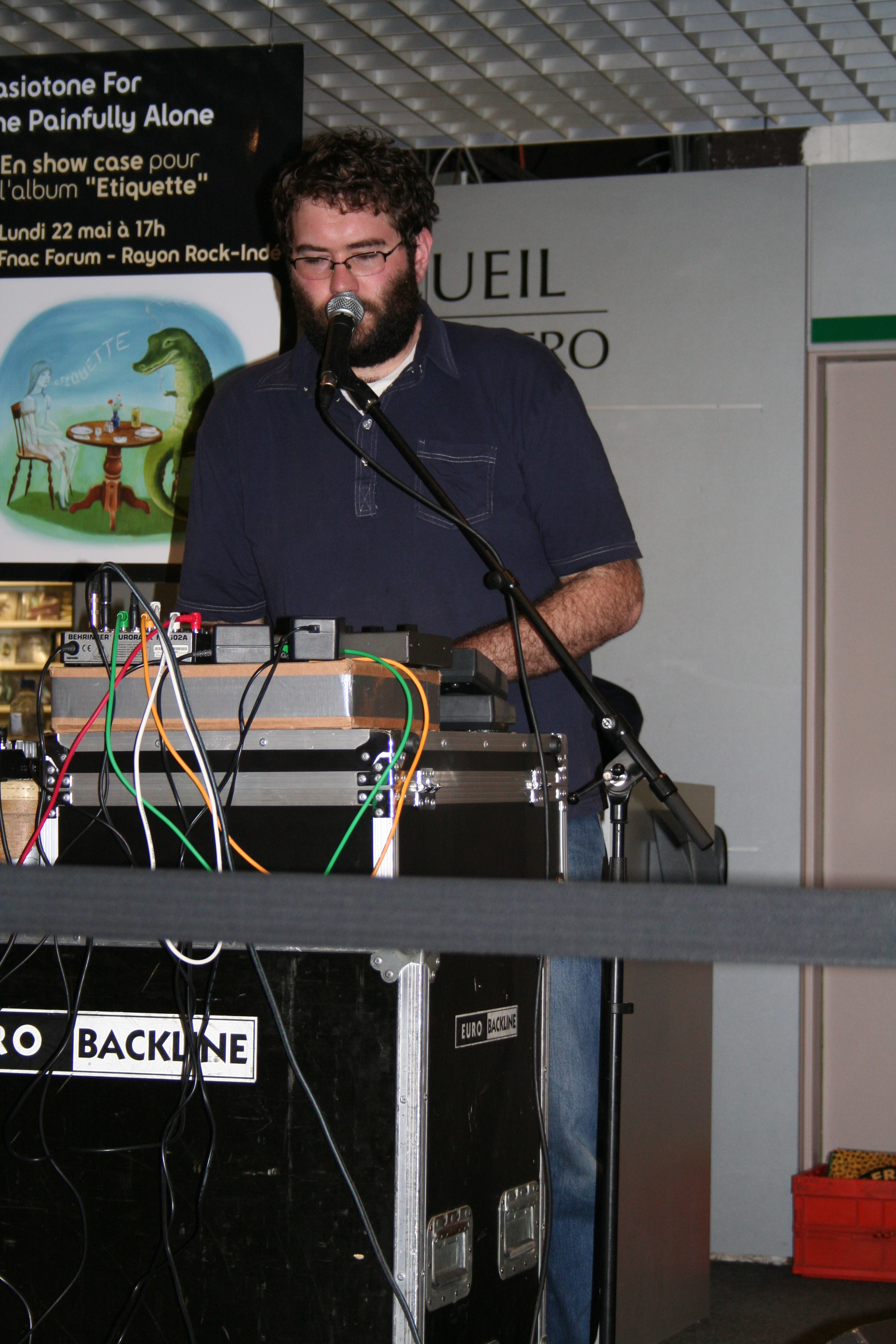
- Owen Ashworth

Background information
- Origin: San Francisco, California, United States
- Genres: Lo-fi; indietronica; indie pop
- Years active: 1997–2010
- Label: Tomlab
- Past members: Owen Ashworth
- Website: Official website

Casiotone for the Painfully Alone (CFTPA) was the musical solo-project of musician Owen Ashworth (born April 22, 1977) of Redwood City, California.

CFTPA was active from 1997 to 2010, and released five studio albums, alongside numerous other releases. CFTPA toured with other indie artists such as The Donkeys, Papercuts, P:ano, The Dead Science, David Bazan, The Rapture, and Xiu Xiu. Following the end of CFTPA, Ashworth began a new project, Advance Base.

== History ==
Owen Ashworth started CFTPA after dropping out of film school in 1997. The project was initially established under a set of Dogme 95-like rules: short songs, played in C, on the white notes of Casio keyboards. The band's musical style was characterized by the use of electronically-produced beats, cheap keyboards, and slow, frank lyrics. From Etiquette onwards, CFTPA widened in musical scope, adding more analog instruments and crafting an overall more organic sound.

In 2010, Ashworth announced that he was retiring Casiotone for the Painfully Alone, as well as the songs he wrote under that name, although he planned to continue making music under the name Advance Base. The project's final show was on December 5, 2010, the thirteen-year anniversary of its first show.

In 2011, Ashworth started the label Orindal Records, through which he releases his own music as Advance Base, as well as other artists including Gia Margaret and Dear Nora.

Owen Ashworth's brother is Gordon Ashworth, who makes experimental harsh noise as Oscillating Innards and ambient works as Concern; Gordon also plays in grindcore/black metal project Knelt Rote.

== Discography ==
=== Casiotone for the Painfully Alone albums ===
- Answering Machine Music - CD/LP (Cassingle USA, 1999) (reissue: Tomlab, 2001)
- Pocket Symphonies for Lonesome Subway Cars - CD/LP (Tomlab, 2001)
- Twinkle Echo - CD/LP (Tomlab, 2003)
- Bobby Malone EP - LP (Tomlab, 2006)
- Etiquette - CD/LP (Tomlab, 2006)
- Vs. Children - CD/LP (Tomlab, 2009)

=== Casiotone for the Painfully Alone compilation albums ===
- The First Two Albums by Casiotone for the Painfully Alone - CD (Tomlab, 2005)
- Town Topic EP - CD EP (Tomlab, 2008)
- Advance Base Battery Life - CD/LP (Tomlab, 2009)

=== Advance Base albums ===
- A Shut-In's Prayer - CD/LP (Caldo Verde / Orindal / Tomlab, 2012)
- Nephew in the Wild - CD/LP/CS (Orindal / Tomlab, 2015)
- In Bloomington - LP/CS (Orindal / Tye Die Tapes, 2016)
- Animal Companionship - LP (Run for Cover Records, 2018)
- Live At Home - LP/CD (Orindal, 2021)
- Wall of Tears & Other Songs I Didn't Write - CS/CD (Orindal, 2021)
- Horrible Occurrences - CS/CD (Orindal, 2024)

=== Advance Base compilation albums ===
- Instrumentals #1 - CS (Orindal, 2012)
- Plastic Owen Band - CS (Orindal, 2015)

=== Advance Base EPs ===
- The World Is In A Bad Fix Everywhere - 7"/CS (Orindal, 2013)
- Tomorrow's Homes Today - CD/CS (Orindal, 2013)

=== Advance Base Singles ===
- Whirlaway the Horse - 7" (PIAPTK, 2011)
- Traditionals - Split 7" with Concern (Orindal, 2011)
- Our Cat - 7" (Orindal, 2011)
- Pamela - 7" (Orindal, 2015)
- Christmas Steve - MP3 (Orindal, 2020)
- Little Sable Point Lighthouse - MP3 (Orindal, 2022)
- How You Got Your Picture on the Wall - MP3 (Orindal, 2023)
