= St Aidan's High School =

Location
- Waverley Drive; Wishaw, North Lanarkshire, ML2 7EW; Scotland
- Coordinates: 55.7803°N 3.9167°W

Information
- Other name: St Aidan's
- Type: Secondary school
- Motto: Latin: Optima Petenda (Seeking the best)
- Religious affiliation: Roman Catholic
- Established: 1963; 63 years ago
- Local authority: North Lanarkshire Council
- Oversight: Roman Catholic Diocese of Motherwell
- Head teacher: Audrey Farley
- Gender: Mixed
- Age range: 11–18
- Colours: Purple, Gold, Black
- Website: blogs.glowscotland.org.uk/nl/StAidans

St Aidan's High School (simply referred to as St Aidan's) is an 11–18 mixed, Roman Catholic, secondary school in Wishaw, North Lanarkshire, Scotland. It is located in the Roman Catholic Diocese of Motherwell.

It was rated 'good' by Education Scotland following its inspection in December 2018, and was ranked 139th out of 339 secondary schools in Scotland for exam results in 2019.

== Notable alumni ==
- John Higgins - snooker player
- Joe Jordan - footballer, Leeds United F.C., Manchester United F.C., A.C. Milan, Scotland national football team
- Nicholas McDonald - singer
- Geraldine McKelvie, journalist
- Stephen O'Donnell - footballer, Motherwell F.C., Scotland national football team
- Jobby - Proper Unit
