= Animal Companionship =

Studio album by Advance Base
- Released: September 21, 2018
- Recorded: Los Angeles, Oak Park, Illinois, Philadelphia, Chicago
- Studios: Palmetto Studio, Los Angeles, Soundhole Studios, Chicago
- Genres: Lo-fi, Indie
- Length: 33:08
- Labels: Run for Cover Records; RFC181, Orindal Records U.S.A; ORD36
- Producers: Jason Quever, Owen Ashworth

Advance Base chronology
In Bloomington (2016)	Animal Companionship (2018)

Animal Companionship is the third studio album by Advance Base, released on 21 September 2018.

== Reception ==
Professional ratings
Aggregate scores
Source	Rating
Metacritic	78/100
Review scores
Source	Rating
AllMusic	4/5 stars
MusicOMH	4/5 stars
Mojo	4/5 stars
PopMatters	(7/10)

Animal Companionship received mainly positive reviews; according to online review aggregator Metacritic, it has a score of 78%, indicating "generally favorable reviews". Ben Thompson of Mojo wrote that the dog-themed album "could all be too cute for its own good but some inspired darker moments elevate the whole to the level of a Raymond Carver short story collection set to music by 'Joan of Arc'-era OMD".

== Track listing ==
All songs written by Owen Ashworth except "You & Me & The Moon" by Stephen Merritt.

1. "True Love Death Dream" – 3:45
2. "Dolores & Kimberly" – 5:05
3. "Your Dog" – 3:45
4. "Christmas in Nightmare City" – 2:10
5. "You & Me & The Moon" – 3:28
6. "Walt's Fantasy" – 3:06
7. "Rabbits" – 4:57
8. "Same Dream" – 2:28
9. "Care" – 3:21
10. "Answering Machine" – 1:07

== Personnel ==
- Owen Ashworth – pianos, synthesizers, samplers, sequencers, drum loops, singing
- Howard Draper – lap steel on "Dolores & Kimberly"
- Peter Gill – pedal steel on "Dolores & Kimberly"
- Gia Margaret – upright piano on "Christmas in Nightmare City"
- Jason Quever – drums on "Care"

Production

Animal Companionship was recorded by Jason Quever at Palmetto Studio, Los Angeles, with additional parts recorded by Owen Ashworth in Oak Park, Illinois. It was mixed by Jason Quever and Owen Ashworth, and mastered by Matthew Barnhart at Chicago Mastering Service.

The cover features a painting by Jessica Seamans, with lettering and design by Dan Black.
