= In the Arms of an Angel =

Studio album by Nicholas McDonald
- Released: 17 March 2014
- Recorded: January 2014
- Genre: Pop
- Length: 38:53
- Label: RCA, Syco
- Producer: Brian Rawling, Richard "Biff" Stannard, Ash Howes, Paul Meehan, Craig Hardy

Singles from In the Arms of an Angel
- 1. "Answerphone" Released: 16 March 2014

In the Arms of an Angel is the debut studio album by Scottish singer Nicholas McDonald, released through RCA Records on 17 March 2014. Consisting mostly of covers, the album was recorded over a seven-day period in January 2014. The album's title comes from the line "you're in the arms of the angel", from the Sarah McLachlan song "Angel", which is one of the songs McDonald covered for the album.

The lead single "Answerphone" was released on 16 March 2014, a day before the album. "Answerphone" is one of just three original songs on the album—the others are "Smile" and "Solid Gold".

== Background ==
On 15 December 2013, McDonald finished as the runner-up on the tenth series of The X Factor. On 8 January 2014, he tweeted "BIG NEWS COMING UP .....", and then announced the following that he had signed a record deal with RCA Records and would be releasing his debut album in March 2014. He said, "When I found out that I was signing to RCA I was over the moon as I knew that they worked with some of the biggest artists in the world. It feels absolutely amazing to be recording my own album and I can't wait to get it out there and give something back to all the fans who have supported me from the very start." On 22 January, it was confirmed that McDonald's debut album would be called Arms of an Angel, though it was later changed to In the Arms of an Angel.

== Recording ==
McDonald went into the recording studio the day after making his announcement and finished making his debut album in just one week. He explained that he was meant to be recording for two weeks, but finished a week early because he had already perfected several of the album's songs, having already performed them on The X Factor. He said, "I was really surprised but it meant I got to come home early. I got everything done. It wasn't too quick. I made sure before I left that everything sounded right and it sounded good. I didn't rush it. They said it could take someone a week, a month or a year. It just depends. But the album sounds the way I want it to sound."

It was also confirmed that the album would consist mostly of covers of songs such as Bruno Mars' "Just the Way You Are", Adele's "Someone like You" and Westlife's "Flying Without Wings" (all of which McDonald performed on The X Factor), but would contain three original tracks which McDonald had been working on since the show. One of these original tracks was the album's lead single, "Answerphone". The others are "Smile" and "Solid Gold".

== Singles ==
On 3 February 2014, the song "Answerphone" was posted to YouTube. It was released as McDonald's debut single on 16 March 2014, the day before the album's release. The single managed to spend one week within The UK Top 75, peaking at #73.

== Track listing ==
No.	Title	Writer(s)	Producer(s)	Length
1.	"Superman"	John Ondrasik	Richard "Biff" Stannard; Ash Howes	3:30
2.	"Answerphone"	Roy Stride, Josh Wilkinson, Red Triangle	Brian Rawling; Paul Meehan; Craig Hardy	3:13
3.	"When the Stars Go Blue"	Ryan Adams	Rawling; Meehan	3:55
4.	"Angel"	Sarah McLachlan	Rawling; Meehan	3:44
5.	"A Thousand Years"	Christina Perri; David Hodges	Rawling; Meehan	4:11
6.	"Smile"	Paul Barry; Paul Meehan; Zak London	Rawling; Meehan	3:49
7.	"Someone like You"	Adele Adkins; Dan Wilson	Rawling; Meehan	4:43
8.	"Flying Without Wings"	Wayne Hector; Steve Mac	Rawling; Meehan	3:42
9.	"Just the Way You Are"	Bruno Mars; Philip Lawrence; Ari Levine; Khalil Walton; Khari Cain	Rawling; Meehan	3:55
10.	"If You're Not the One"	Daniel Bedingfield	Rawling; Meehan	3:54
11.	"Solid Gold"	Nicholas McDonald; Patrick Mascall; Hardy; Barry	Hardy	2:57

== Chart performance ==
On 20 March 2014, the album entered the Irish Albums Chart at number 21. On 23 March, it debuted at number six on the UK Albums Chart and number one on the Scottish Albums Chart.

== Charts ==
Weekly chart performance for In the Arms of an Angel
Chart (2014)	Peak position
Irish Albums (IRMA)	21
Scottish Albums (OCC)	1
UK Albums (OCC)	6
UK Album Downloads Chart (OCC)	31
UK Physical Album Chart (OCC)	6

== Release history ==
Region	Date	Format	Label
Ireland	14 March 2014	CD, digital download	RCA, Syco
United Kingdom	17 March 2014	CD, digital download	RCA, Syco
