= Vs. Children =

Studio album by Casiotone for the Painfully Alone
- Released: April 7, 2009
- Genre: Lo-fi, indie, electronic
- Length: 30:36
- Label: Tomlab; TOM128
- Producer: Owen Ashworth, Jason Quever

Casiotone for the Painfully Alone chronology
Etiquette (2006)	Vs. Children (2009)

Professional ratings
Review scores
Source	Rating
Tiny Mix Tapes	3/5 stars
Allmusic	4/5 stars
Pitchfork Media	(7.9/10)

Vs. Children is the fifth and final studio album by Casiotone for the Painfully Alone.

== Track listing ==
All songs written by Owen Ashworth

1. "Casiotone for the Painfully Alone vs. Children" – 0:49
2. "Tom Justice, The Choir Boy Robber, Apprehended at Ace Hardware in Libertyville, IL" – 4:12
3. "Optimist vs. The Silent Alarm (When The Saints Go Marching In)" – 1:51
4. "Natural Light" – 2:23
5. "Traveling Salesman's Young Wife Home Alone on Christmas in Montpelier, VT" – 2:45
6. "Man O' War" – 3:08
7. "Northfield, MN" – 5:08
8. "Killers" – 2:39
9. "Harsh The Herald Angels Sing" – 3:05
10. "You Were Alone" – 2:58
11. "White Jetta" – 3:17

Notes

- The second track is based on a true story about a bank robber (and former co-worker of songwriter Owen Ashworth).
