= Twinkle Echo =

Studio album by Casiotone for the Painfully Alone
- Released: September 9, 2003
- Recorded: 2001–2003
- Genre: Lo-fi, indie, electronic
- Length: 29:54
- Label: Tomlab; TOM31

Casiotone for the Painfully Alone chronology
Pocket Symphonies for Lonesome Subway Cars (2001)	Twinkle Echo (2003)	Etiquette (2006)

Professional ratings
Review scores
Source	Rating
Allmusic	link
Pitchfork Media	6.9/10 26 Sep 03

Twinkle Echo is a studio album of Lo-fi music by Casiotone for the Painfully Alone. It was released in 2003 on Tomlab.

== Track listing ==
1. "To My Mr. Smith" – 1:52
2. "Jeane, if You're Ever in Portland" – 2:28
3. "Toby, Take a Bow" – 1:59
4. "It Wasn't the Same Somehow" – 2:21
5. "Hey Eleanor" – 1:29
6. "Half Ghost" – 3:04
7. "Calloused Fingers Won't Make You Strong, Edith Wong" – 1:43
8. "Blue Corolla" – 2:03
9. "Casiotone for the Painfully Alone in a Yellow T-Shirt" – 2:18
10. "Students for Scarves & Charm" – 0:55
11. "Roberta C." – 3:45
12. "Attic Room" – 3:08
13. "Giant" – 2:10
14. "Twinkle Echo" – 0:39
