= Nicholas McDonald =

Scottish singer-songwriter (born 1996)

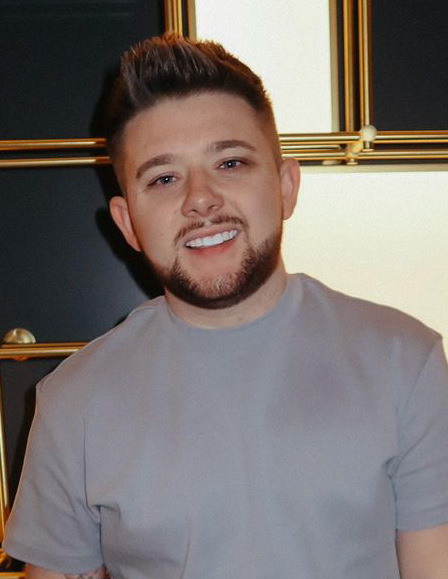
- McDonald in 2023

Background information
- Also known as: Nicky McDonald
- Born: Nicholas McDonald; 23 November 1996 (age 29); Bellshill, North Lanarkshire, Scotland
- Origin: Wishaw, North Lanarkshire, Scotland
- Genre: Pop
- Occupations: Singer–songwriter, recording artist
- Years active: 2013–present
- Label: RCA
- Website: nicholasmcdonald.co.uk

Nicholas "Nicky" McDonald (born 23 November 1996) is a Scottish singer–songwriter and recording artist. He was the runner-up of the tenth series of The X Factor in 2013. After the show, he signed with RCA Records and released his debut single "Answerphone" as the lead single from his debut album. The single peaked at number twenty eight in Scotland and number seventy three in the United Kingdom. The album, In the Arms of an Angel (2014), was recorded in a period of only one week, and debuted at number one in his native Scotland, spending eight weeks within the Scottish Albums Chart Top 100. Additionally, it debuted at number six in the United Kingdom and number twenty-one in the Republic of Ireland.

He had previously indicated that he wished to release two studio albums, and in 2018, released the single "Limelight", expected to be the lead single from his yet to be announced second studio album. Despite delays in the release of his second studio album, he continues to tour, both at festivals and private functions, with McDonald claiming in 2023 that he "roughly does about 100 to 120 shows a year".

In 2024, McDonald headlined a homecoming performance in his hometown of Wishaw, celebrating ten years since his debut on The X Factor. He performed at the Town House in Wishaw, and stated that the performance was "probably the biggest show of the year for me".

== Early life ==
McDonald was born in Bellshill, to parents Eileen and Derrick McDonald. He has two brothers and a sister. He has the rare heart condition Long QT syndrome and, in an interview with the Daily Star, said that he almost died when he was eight.

McDonald previously attended St Aidan's High School in Wishaw. He missed Sixth Year due to The X Factor and quit in January 2014 after the show.

== Career ==
=== The X Factor (2013–2014) ===
On 4 June 2013, McDonald auditioned in Glasgow for the tenth series of The X Factor in front of judges Louis Walsh, Gary Barlow, Nicole Scherzinger and Sharon Osbourne. He sang Secret Garden's "You Raise Me Up" and received three yeses from the judges except for Barlow, who reasoned that he was not yet ready for the competition. At the arena auditions, he sang "A Thousand Years" and received four yeses from the judges, putting him through to bootcamp in the boys category, mentored by Walsh. At the six-chair challenge, he was the final contestant in the boys category to perform. He sang Jason Mraz's "I Won't Give Up" and afterwards Walsh said, "That was my favourite audition of the entire night." McDonald took the seat of Alejandro Fernandez-Holt and progressed through to judges' houses. At judges' houses he sang "If You're Not the One" and "Someone like You". Walsh later chose him for the live shows, along with Luke Friend and Sam Callahan.

McDonald advanced through every week without ever being in the bottom two. On 8 December, along with Sam Bailey and Luke Friend, he made it to the final. He became the first Scottish contestant to achieve this feat since Leon Jackson in 2007. On the 7th of December he published a song titled "Born on SouthSide", On 14 December, he duetted with former Westlife singer Shane Filan and was later announced as one of the final two, advancing along with Bailey. After singing "Superman (It's Not Easy)" by Five for Fighting as his winner's song, he finished as runner-up to Bailey. When the weekly voting statistics were revealed after the final, they showed that McDonald and Bailey had been the top two contestants every week; McDonald won three weeks and Bailey won the other seven.

The X Factor performances and results
Show	Song choice	Theme	Result
Room audition	"You Raise Me Up" - Westlife	—N/a	Through to arena audition
Arena audition	"A Thousand Years" - Christina Perri	—N/a	Through to six chair challenge
Six chair challenge	"I Won't Give Up" - Jason Mraz	—N/a	Through to judges' houses
Judges' houses	“If You're Not the One” - Daniel Bedingfield	—N/a	Through to live shows
Live show 1	"True" - Spandau Ballet	Songs from the 1980s	Saturday - Safe (2nd)
Live show 1	"True" - Spandau Ballet	Songs from the 1980s	Sunday - Safe (1st)
Live show 2	"She's the One" - Robbie Williams	Love and heartbreak	Saturday - Safe (1st)
Live show 2	"She's the One" - Robbie Williams	Love and heartbreak	Sunday - Safe (1st)
Live show 3	"Angel" - Sarah McLachlan	Movie week	Saturday - Safe (2nd)
Live show 3	"Angel" - Sarah McLachlan	Movie week	Sunday - Safe (2nd)
Live show 4	"Rock with You" - Michael Jackson	Disco	Safe (2nd)
Live show 5	"Dream a Little Dream of Me" - Cass Elliot with The Mamas & the Papas	Big band	Safe (2nd)
Live show 6	"Someone like You" - Adele	The Great British Songbook	Safe (1st)
Live show 7	"The Climb" - Joe McElderry	The Best of The X Factor	Safe (2nd)
Quarter-Final	"Just the Way You Are" - Bruno Mars	Jukebox	Safe (2nd)
Quarter-Final	"Greatest Day" - Take That	Musical heroes	Safe (2nd)
Semi-Final	"Halo" - Beyoncé	Elton John vs. Beyoncé	Safe (2nd)
Semi-Final	"Don't Let the Sun Go Down on Me" - Elton John	Elton John vs. Beyoncé	Safe (2nd)
Final (Part 1)	"Candy" - Robbie Williams	No theme	Safe (2nd)
Final (Part 1)	"Flying Without Wings" - (with Shane Filan)	Celebrity duet	Safe (2nd)
Final (Part 2)	"Angel" - Sarah McLachlan	Song of the series	Runner-up
Final (Part 2)	"Superman (It's Not Easy)"	Winners single	Runner-up

=== In the Arms of an Angel (2014–2017) ===
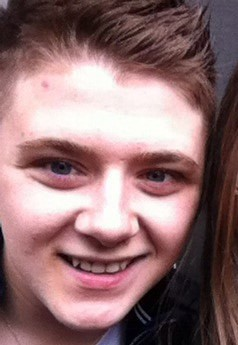
McDonald in 2014

After the show ended, McDonald quit school to concentrate on his singing career. In January 2014, McDonald announced that he had signed with RCA Records and would release his debut album in March. McDonald said, "When I found out that I was signing to RCA I was over the moon as I knew that they worked with some of the biggest artists in the world. It feels absolutely amazing to be recording my own album and I can't wait to get it out there and give something back to all the fans who have supported me from the very start."

On 22 January, he confirmed the title of his debut album, Arms of an Angel, though it was later changed to In the Arms of an Angel. The album includes covers of songs such as Bruno Mars's "Just the Way You Are", Adele's "Someone Like You" and Westlife's "Flying Without Wings", all of which McDonald performed on The X Factor. It also contains three original tracks which he had been working on since the show-"Answerphone", "Smile" and "Solid Gold". The album was preceded by the lead single "Answerphone", which was released on 16 March, the day before the album, the song peaked at number 73 on the UK Singles Chart and number 28 on the Scottish Singles Chart. He released his debut album In the Arms of an Angel on 17 March 2014. On 23 March 2014 the album entered the UK Albums Chart at number 6 and number 1 on the Scottish Albums Chart.

=== "Limelight" and second album (2017–2023) ===
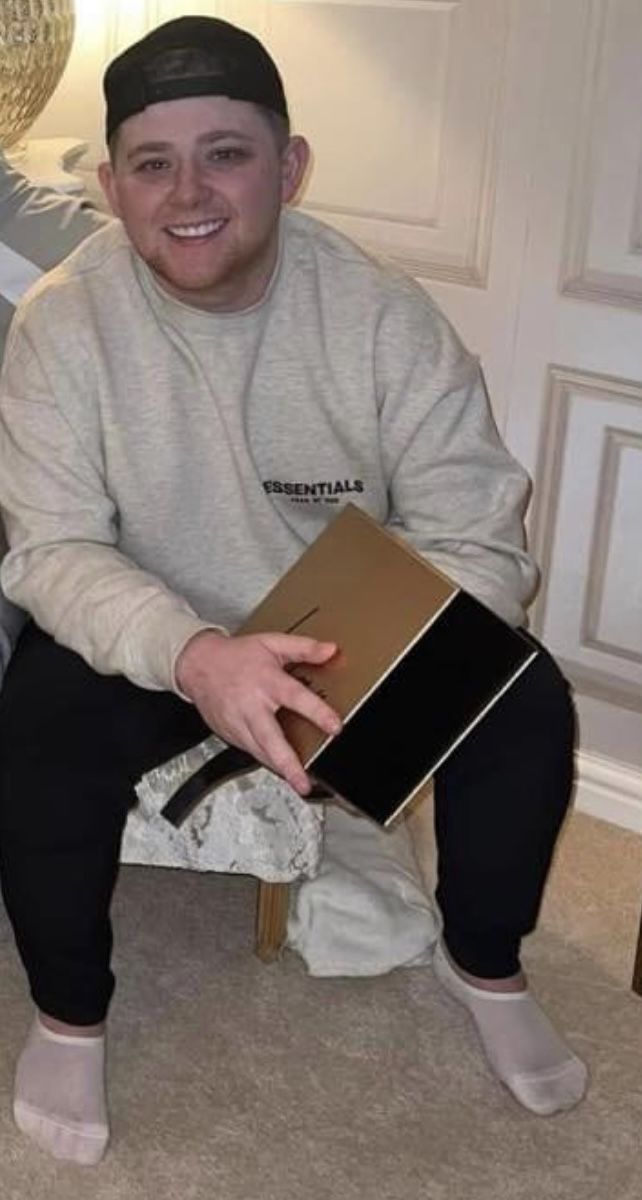
McDonald in the late 2010s

In 2017, work towards a second studio album was announced via McDonald's official website and McDonald was cited acts such as Michael Jackson, Bruno Mars, One Direction and Justin Bieber as influences towards the musical sound that will be contained on his upcoming album. As of August 2017, no release date has been confirmed by McDonald or by his record label. McDonald developed a new touring show where he performs original material, covers of modern chart music, as well as "the beloved ballads".

On 19 October 2018, McDonald posted on his official Twitter account indicating to followers about new music, confirming his new single "Limelight" would be released on 23 November 2018. The single was noted for a more "stripped back" approach, focusing primarily on his vocal ability and usage of a piano as the main instrument throughout the song. It was claimed that the single continued a more "mature sound" to his music.

=== 10th anniversary (2023–present) ===
In 2023, it was announced that McDonald would perform a homecoming concert in Wishaw in October 2023 to mark ten years since his debut. Ahead of the concert and following the announcement, he claimed that he was "excited to be going back" and that the "homecoming day [on The X Factor] was something I’ll never forget". The performance was originally scheduled for 21 October 2023 at Motherwell Theatre, but was rescheduled instead to 25 May 2024, taking place at the Town House in Hamilton. The postponement of the original date in Motherwell was later attributed to roofing issues, particularly construction issues regarding the roof, meaning a new venue required to be sought for the performance.

In October 2024, he performed at the NHS Lanarkshire Staff Awards, dedicating his performance to NHS staff who has cared for him since he suffered a cardiac arrest when he was 8 years old, confirming that he still receives regular care from NHS Scotland as a result. He is scheduled to headline the Airdrie Town Hall in June 2025.

== Artistry ==
McDonald has been described as being "able to make people smile with both his beaming personality and incredible performances". McDonald has performed alongside Westlife frontman Shane Filan, both on The X Factor as well as being invited by Filan to join him on his Right Here tour in 2016.

Elton John requested to meet with McDonald personally, and when speaking about McDonald, regarded himself as a fan of McDonald and his work.

== Personal life ==
McDonald attended St Aidan's High School in Wishaw, but left the school early to participate in The X Factor. McDonald was diagnosed with Long QT Syndrome at a young age, which is a rare heart condition that causes delayed repolarization of the heart following a heartbeat which in turn increases the risk of episodes of torsades de pointes. In recent times his Long QT Syndrome has rendered him partially deaf.

On 31 August 2019, he got engaged to his American girlfriend, Brandi Sommer from Florida, and has been married since 2019. McDonald continues to live in Wishaw.

== Discography ==
=== Albums ===
Title	Details	Peak chart positions				
Title	Details	SCO	IRE	UK	UK Down	UK Phys
In the Arms of an Angel	Released: 17 March 2014; Label: RCA Records Syco; Format: Digital download, CD	1	21	6	31	6

=== Singles ===
Title	Year	Peak chart positions			Album
Title	Year	SCO	UK	UK Down	Album
"Answerphone"	2014	28	73	90	In the Arms of an Angel
"Limelight"	2018	—	—	—	Non-album single
"—" denotes a single that did not chart or was not released.

== Tours ==
Headlining

- The X Factor Live Tour (2014)
- MAC Music Tour (2014)
- In the Arms of an Angel Tour (2014)

Supporting

- Shane Filan - Right Here Tour – singing "Flying Without Wings" (2016)
