= Silver Lake State Park (Michigan) =

State park in Michigan, United States

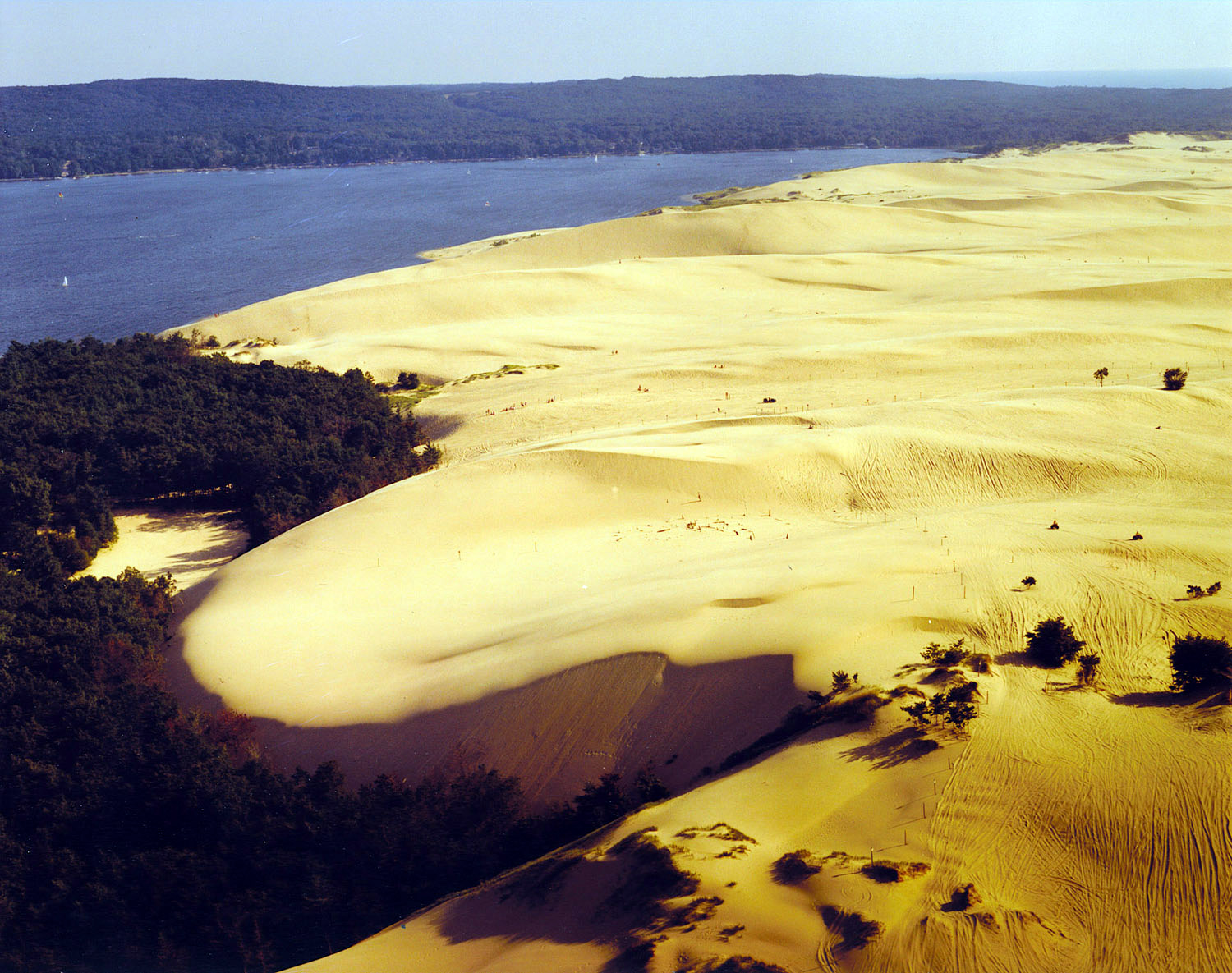
- Silver Lake and sand dunes

- Location within Michigan Location within the United States
- Location: Golden Township, Oceana County, Michigan, United States
- Nearest town: Mears, Michigan
- Coordinates: 43°40′43″N 86°30′40″W
- Area: 2,936 acres (1,188 ha)
- Elevation: 656 feet (200 m)
- Established: 1920
- Administrator: Michigan Department of Natural Resources
- Designation: Michigan state park
- Website: Official website

Silver Lake State Park is a 2,936-acre (1,188 ha) public recreation area bordering Lake Michigan and Silver Lake, four miles (6.4 km) west of Mears in Oceana County, Michigan. The state park is composed of mature forest land and over 2,000 acres (810 ha) of sand dunes. Park grounds include the Little Sable Point Light and an off-road vehicle (ORV) area for driving on the sand dunes.

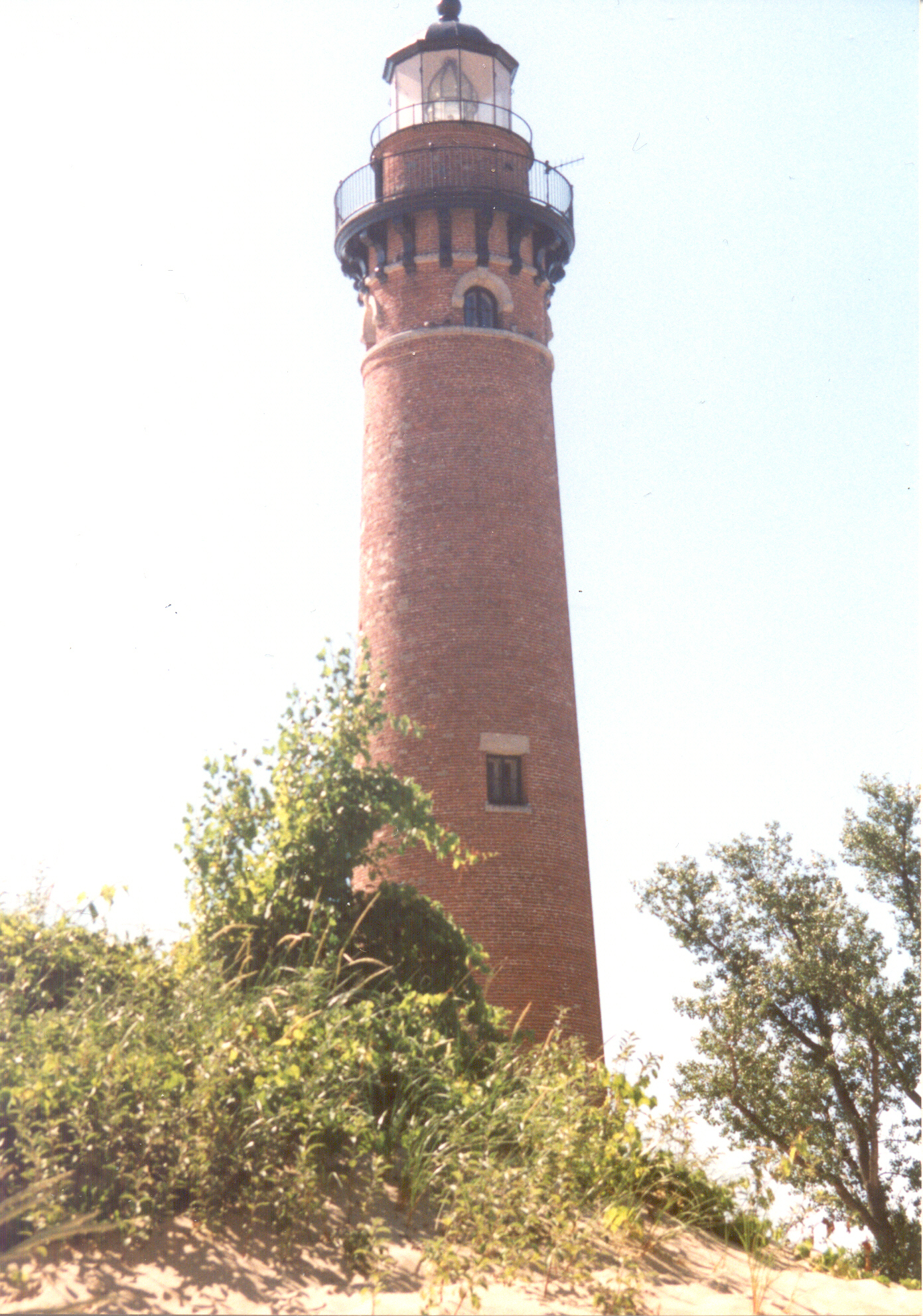
Little Sable Point Lighthouse

== History ==
The park originated in 1920 when 25 acres on the east side of Silver Lake were donated for park purposes by Carrie E. Mears, the daughter of lumber baron Charles Mears. In 1926, the federal government transferred 900 acres to the state, which became Sand Dunes State Park in 1949. Based upon a 1949 master plan, the two were merged, with Silver Lake State Park seeing its new boundaries dedicated in 1951.

== Features ==
The park is 1.5 miles (2.4 km) wide and three miles (4.8 km) long and is divided into three segments: The northern area is an all-terrain vehicle dunes area where private motorized vehicle may be driven, the middle of the park is a non-vehicle area (the Walking Dunes), and the southernmost section is leased to a private operator.

The park encompasses the entire 1.6-mile (2.6 km) western shoreline of Silver Lake, a 690-acre (280 ha) kidney-shaped natural lake approximately one mile inland from Lake Michigan. The Silver Lake shore includes the park's active dune complex and an emergent wetland area adjacent to the lake in its southwestern corner.

The discovery of Piping plovers in the northern portion of the ORV area during nesting season has led officials to create buffer zones from time to time to protect the federally endangered species.

== Activities and amenities ==
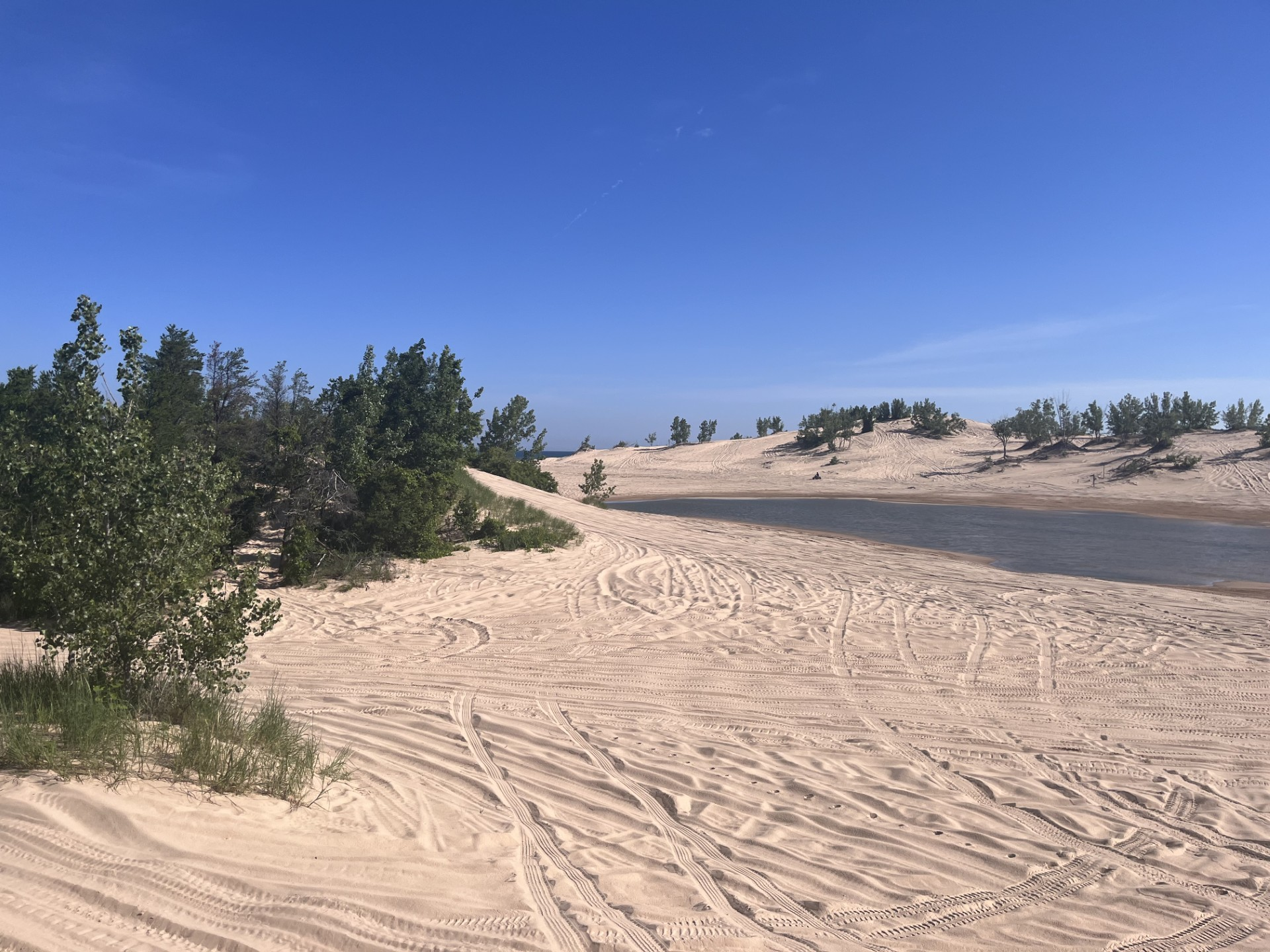
Off-road vehicle zone of Silver Lake Sand Dunes, with Lake Michigan visible in the background

The park's recreational opportunities include camping, hunting, swimming, hiking, boating, fishing, picnicking, and off-road vehicle driving.
