= Answering Machine Music =

Studio album by Casiotone for the Painfully Alone
- Released: 1999
- Recorded: 1999
- Genre: Lo-fi, indie, electronic
- Length: 37:39
- Label: Tomlab
- Producer: Owen Ashworth

Casiotone for the Painfully Alone chronology
| Answering Machine Music (1999) | Pocket Symphonies for Lonesome Subway Cars (2001) |

Professional ratings
Review scores
| Source | Rating |
|---|---|
| AllMusic | 3/5 stars |

Answering Machine Music is an album by Casiotone for the Painfully Alone, released in 1999 on Owen Ashworth's label Cassingle USA. This album was reissued on Tomlab in 2002 and included four bonus tracks (13–16 below).

In 2005, a remastered version of the album, along with a remastered version of Pocket Symphonies for Lonesome Subway Cars, was released on Tomlab as The First Two Albums by Casiotone for the Painfully Alone.

== Track listing ==
1. "Theme from Answering Machine Music (David Hanna)" – 0:23
2. "When the Bridge Toll Was a Dollar" – 2:45
3. "Casiotone for the Painfully Alone Joins the Foreign Legion" – 2:38
4. "Cold Shoulder" – 2:08
5. "Rice Dream Girl" – 1:53
6. "Secretest Crush" – 1:54
7. "A Normal Suburban Lifestyle is a Near Impossibility Once You’ve Fallen In Love With an International Spy" – 2:43
8. "Baby It's You" – 4:55
9. "You Never Call" – 1:40
10. "Daina Flores You're The One" – 1:51
11. "Beeline" – 3:47
12. "I Should Have Kissed You When I Had a Chance" – 1:15
13. "Hey Jelly" – 2:03
14. "Hotel Huntington Sign" – 2:31
15. "It’s Winter and You Don’t Love Me Anymore" – 3:00
16. "Seattle, Washington" – 2:13
