= The Mears Newz =

Michigan Newspaper

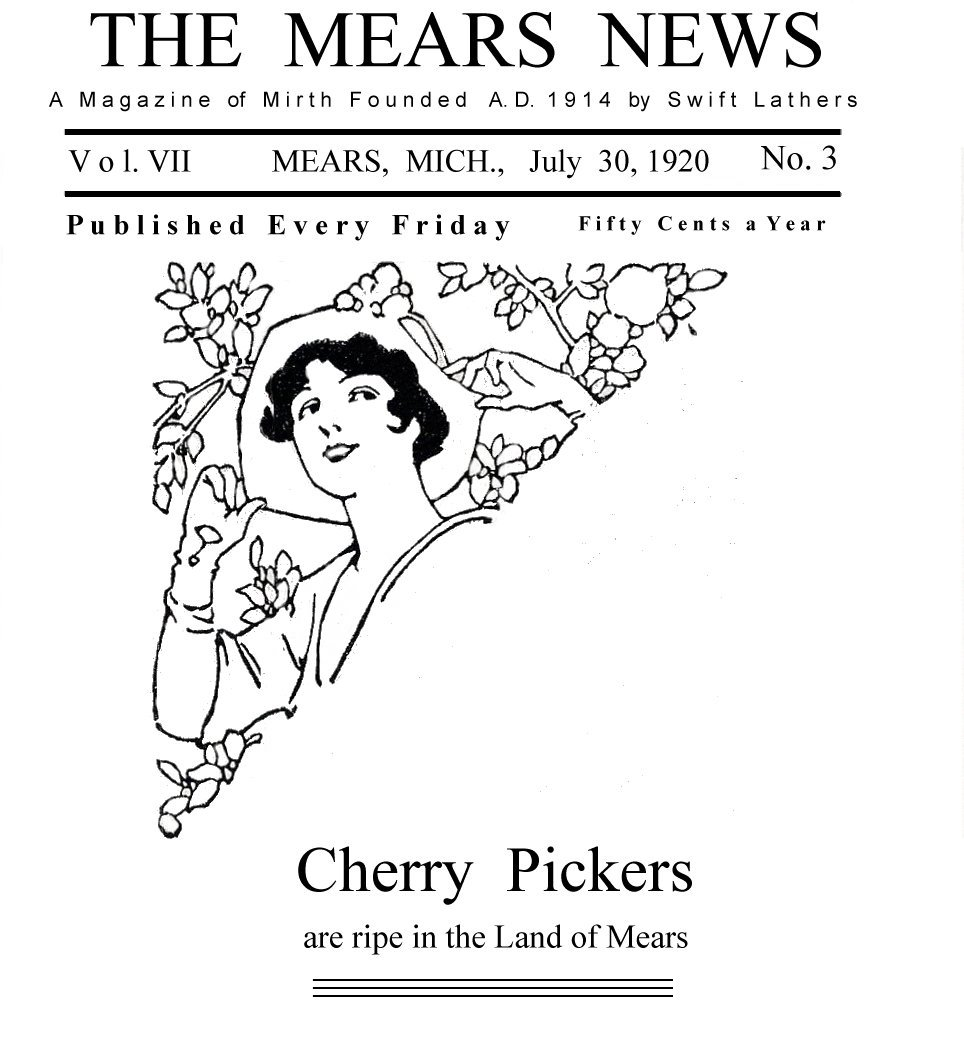
Typical front page

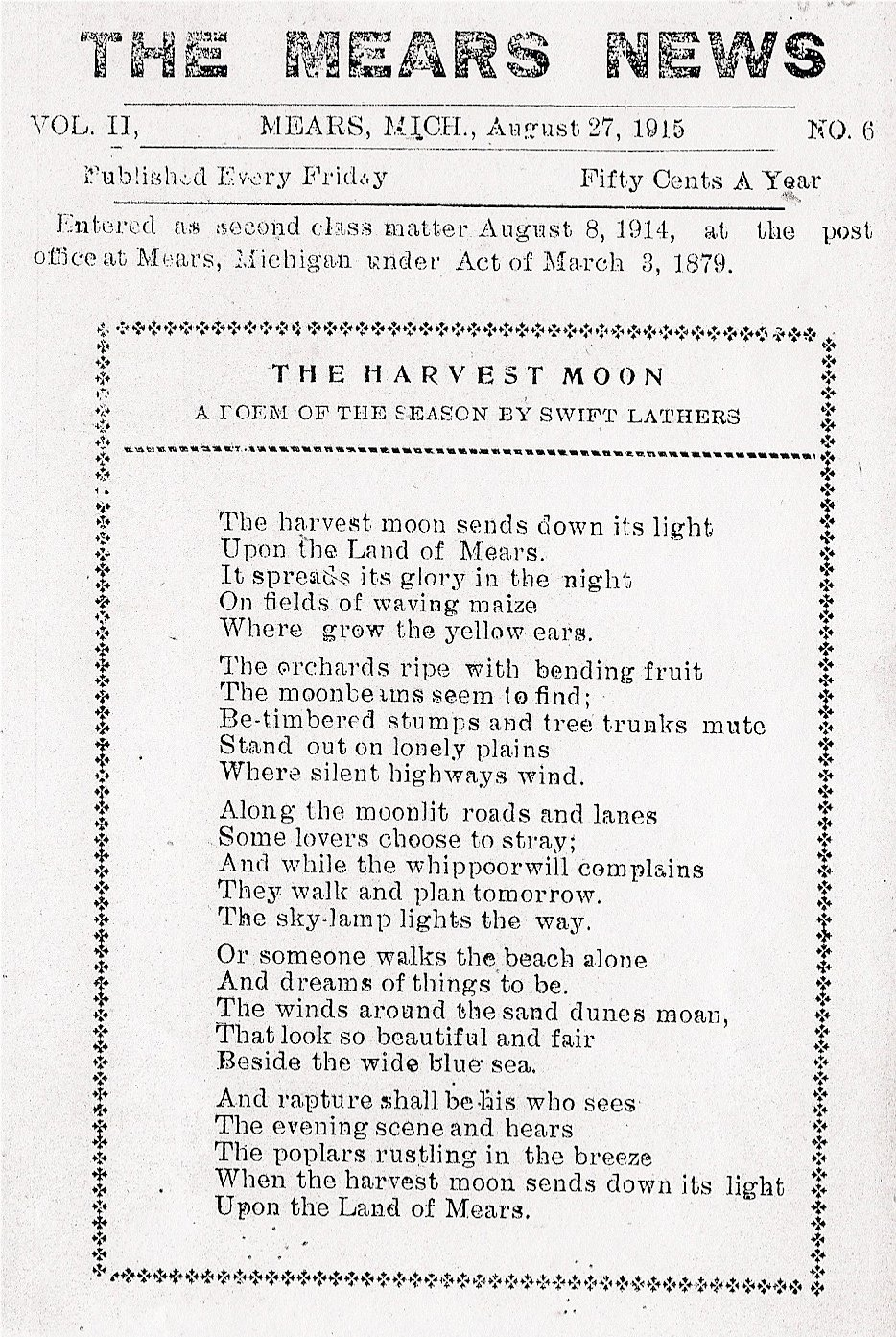
Lathers' poem "The Harvest Moon"

The Mears Newz (earlier known as The Mears News) was a twentieth-century newspaper published in Mears, Michigan.

== History ==
The Mears News (Note: Original spelling of the newspaper's name.) made its debut July 24, 1914. The Mears Newz was published by Swift Lathers, its founder and editor. Lathers worked as a stringer for a Detroit newspaper, he moved to Mears in 1909, and started The Mears News and reported on events in Mears. Lathers worked as reporter, writer, editor, printed the newspapers on a foot-operated printing press, and would hand deliver the newspapers locally.

The newspaper was self-proclaimed as The Smallest Newspaper in the World. It was published on a paper that was smaller than the normal size bond. Its size was approximately that of a postcard at about five by seven inches and consisted of four pages. The weekly newspaper was published every Friday from 1914 to 1970. Lathers had paid subscribers in 38 states. Sometime after 1916 and before 1919 the News name was changed to Newz on the suggestion from a subscriber.

The Mears Newz during the 1940s had a worldwide circulation of over 2000. Lathers had a circulation at one time of over 2,700 when he voluntarily cut the list to keep subscription circulation manageable. Those whose name started before D and all those after S no longer received his newspaper."

The subscription cost for the newspaper was 50 cents per year and 1 dollar for a six-month subscription. When a local businessman told Lathers that his publication would not last six months and offered him 25 cents Lathers set his subscription fee at 50 cents a year, 1 dollar for six months and 2 dollars for 3 months. The newspaper was in production for 56 years and the subscription cost never changed.

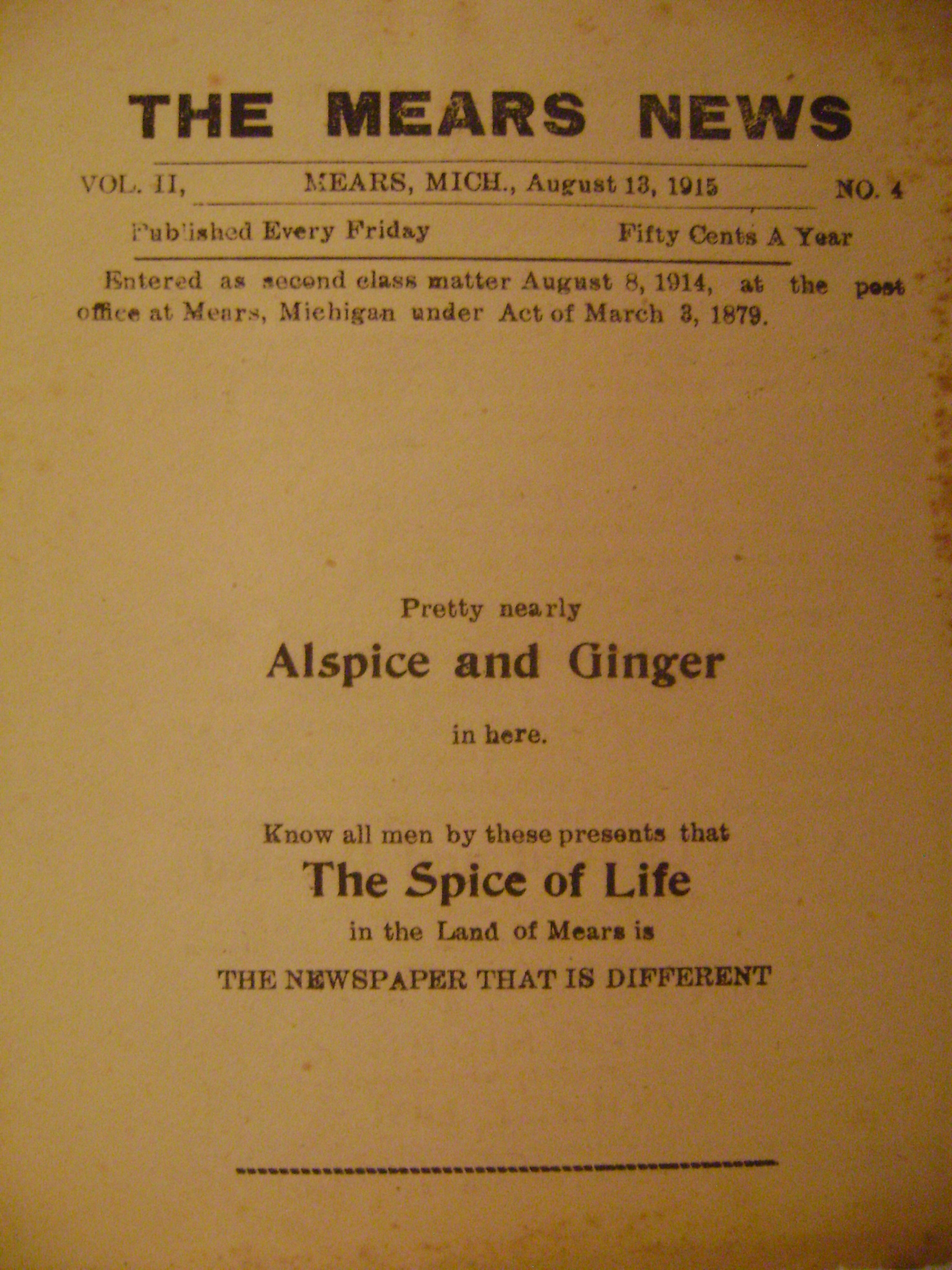

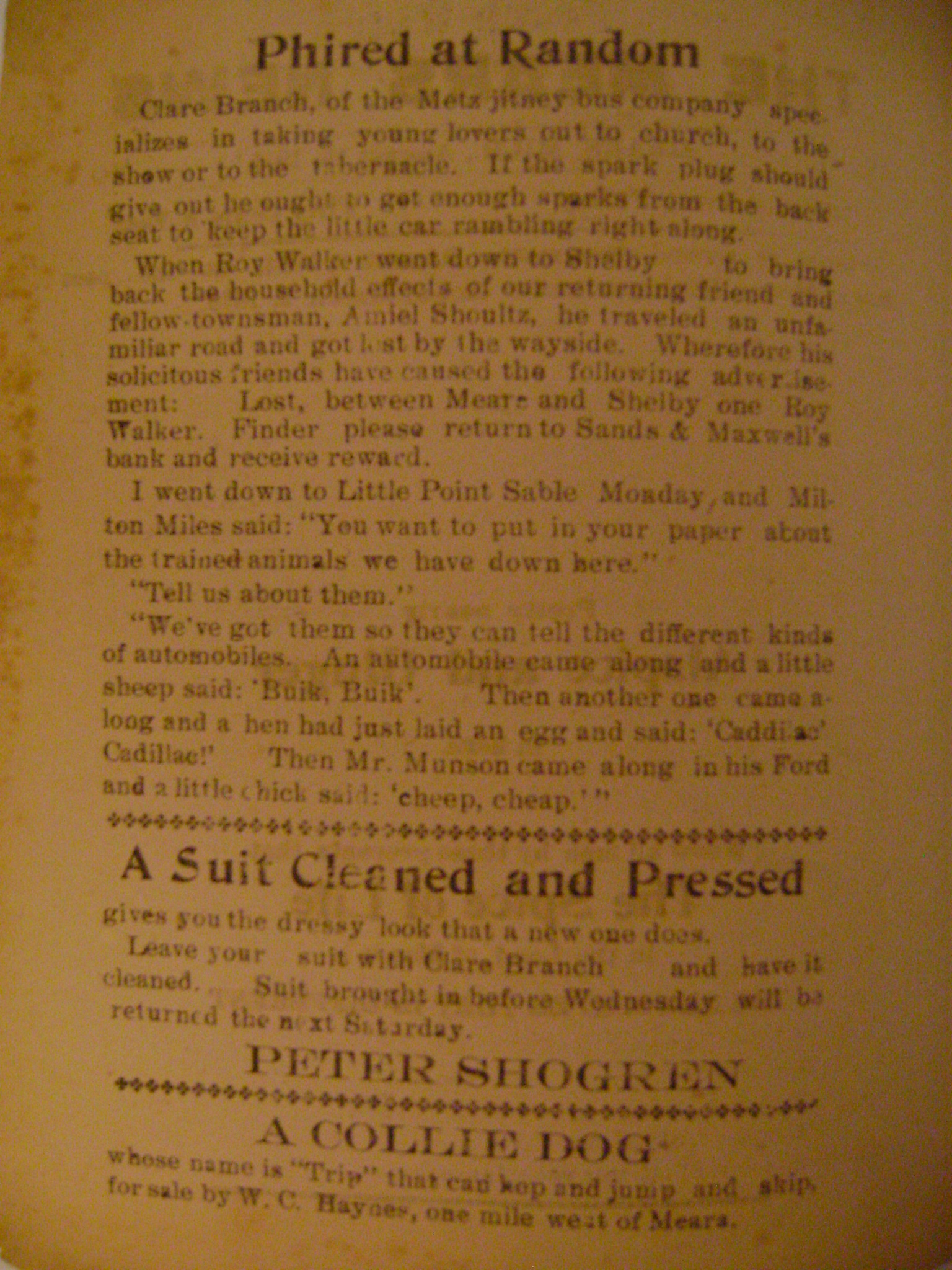

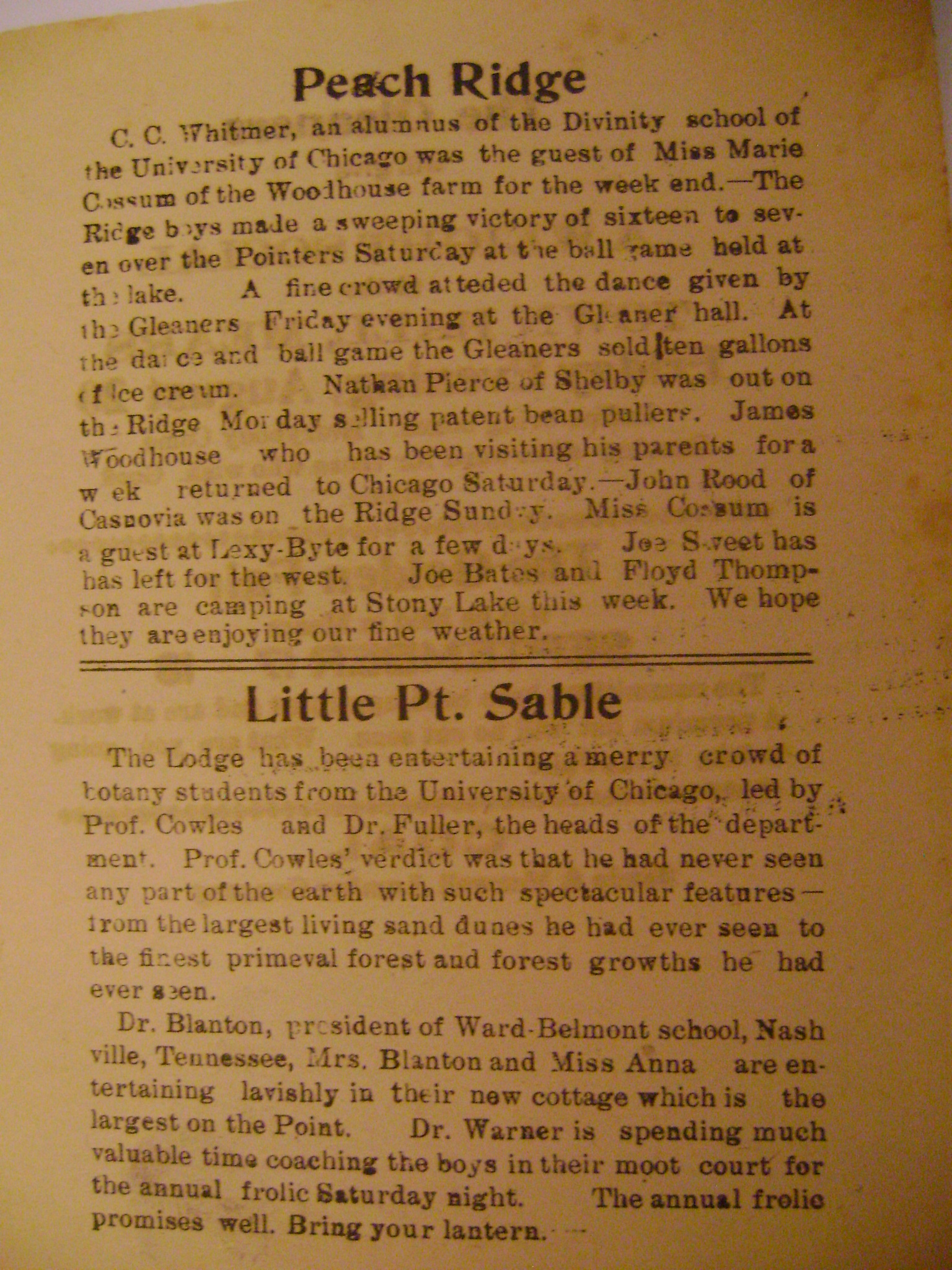

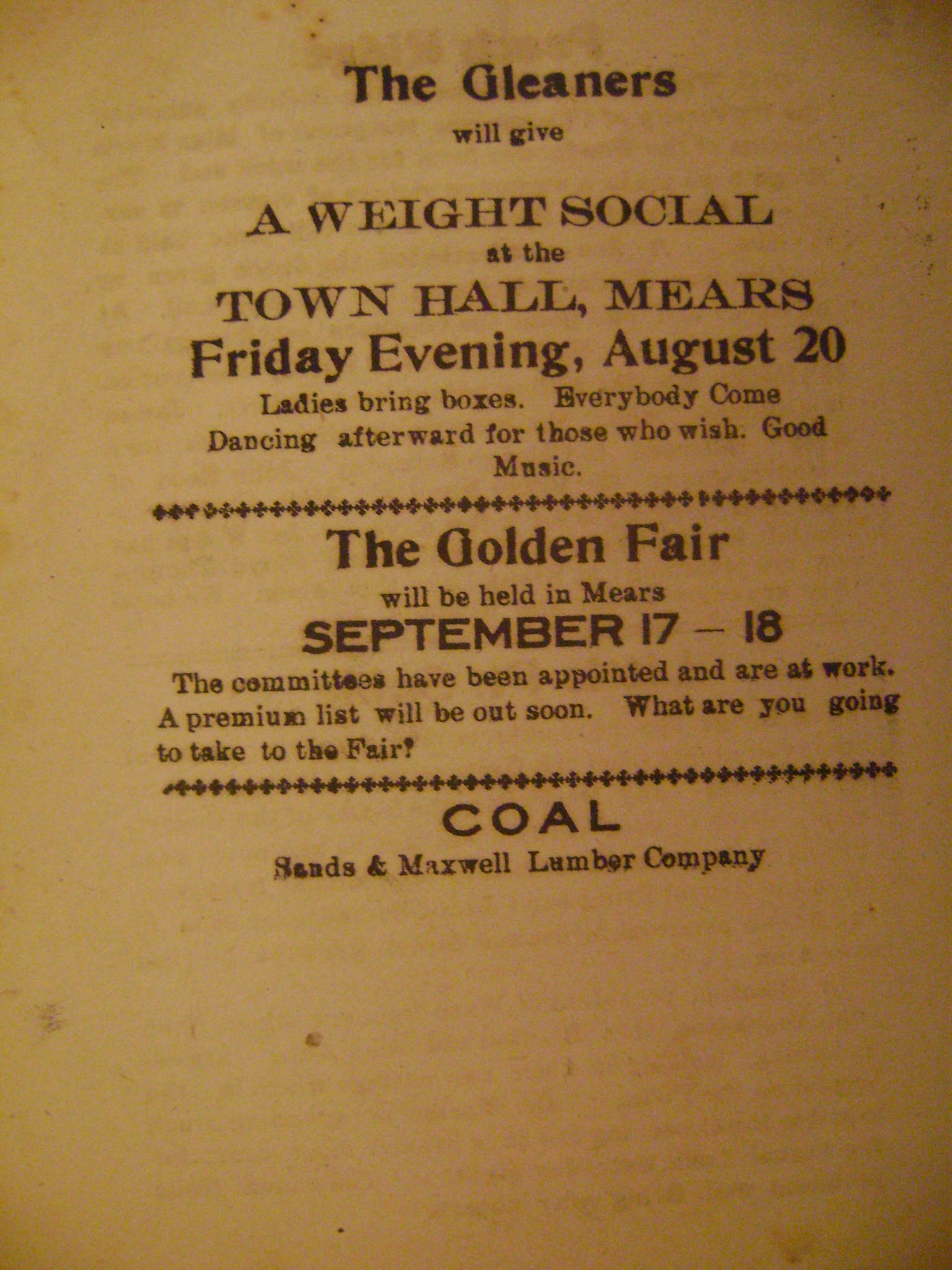

The Mears Newz August 18, 1922:

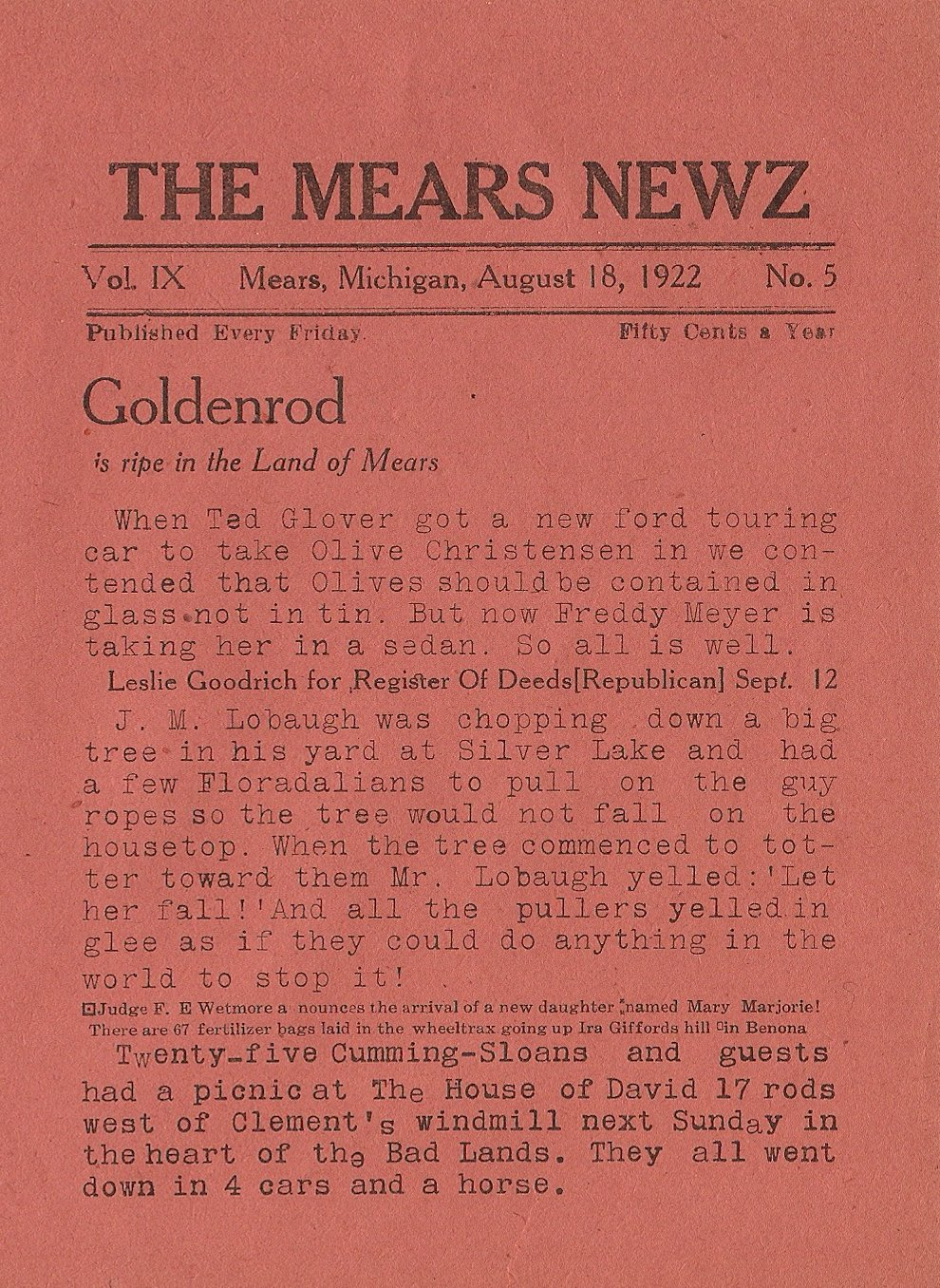

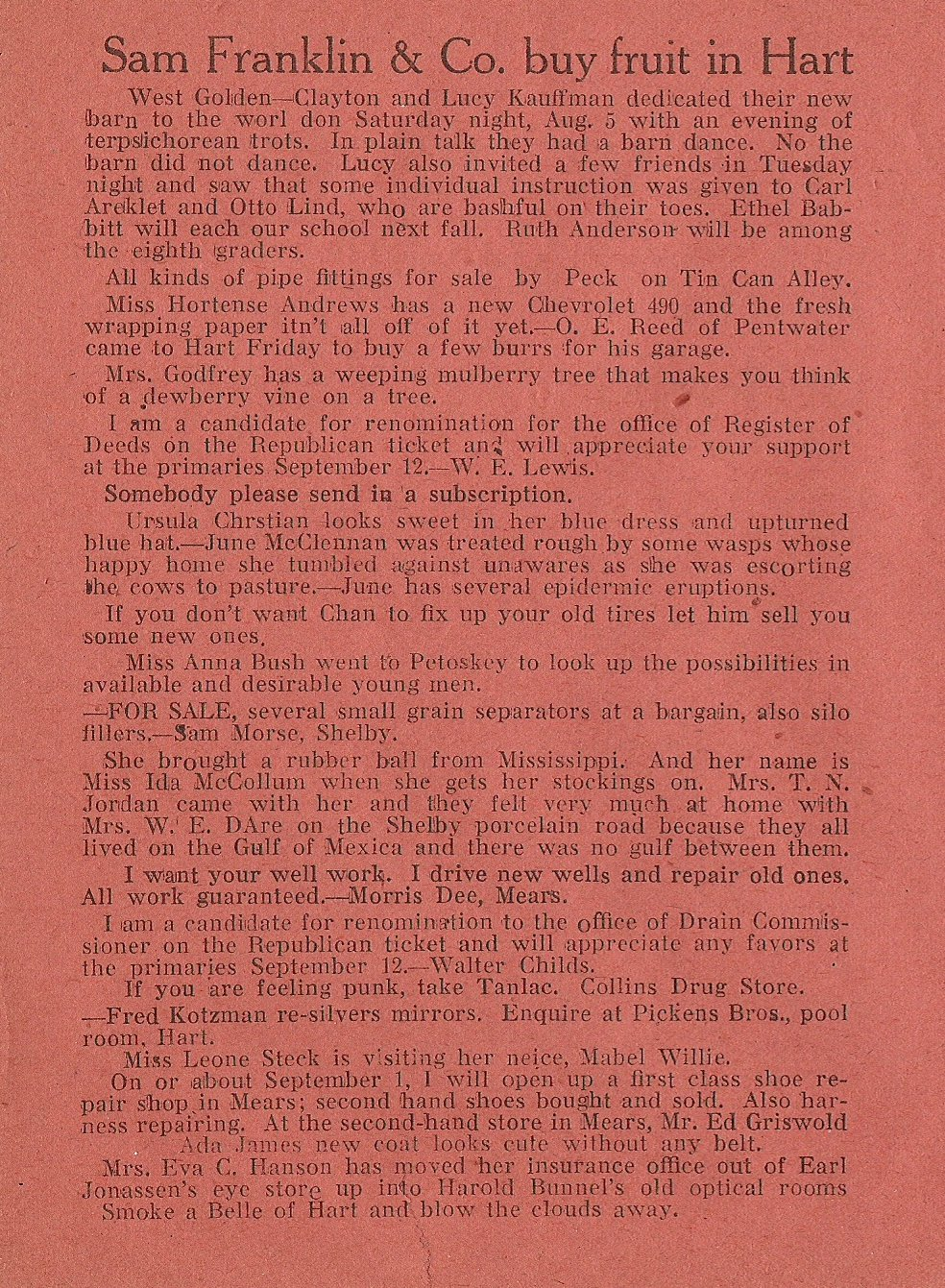

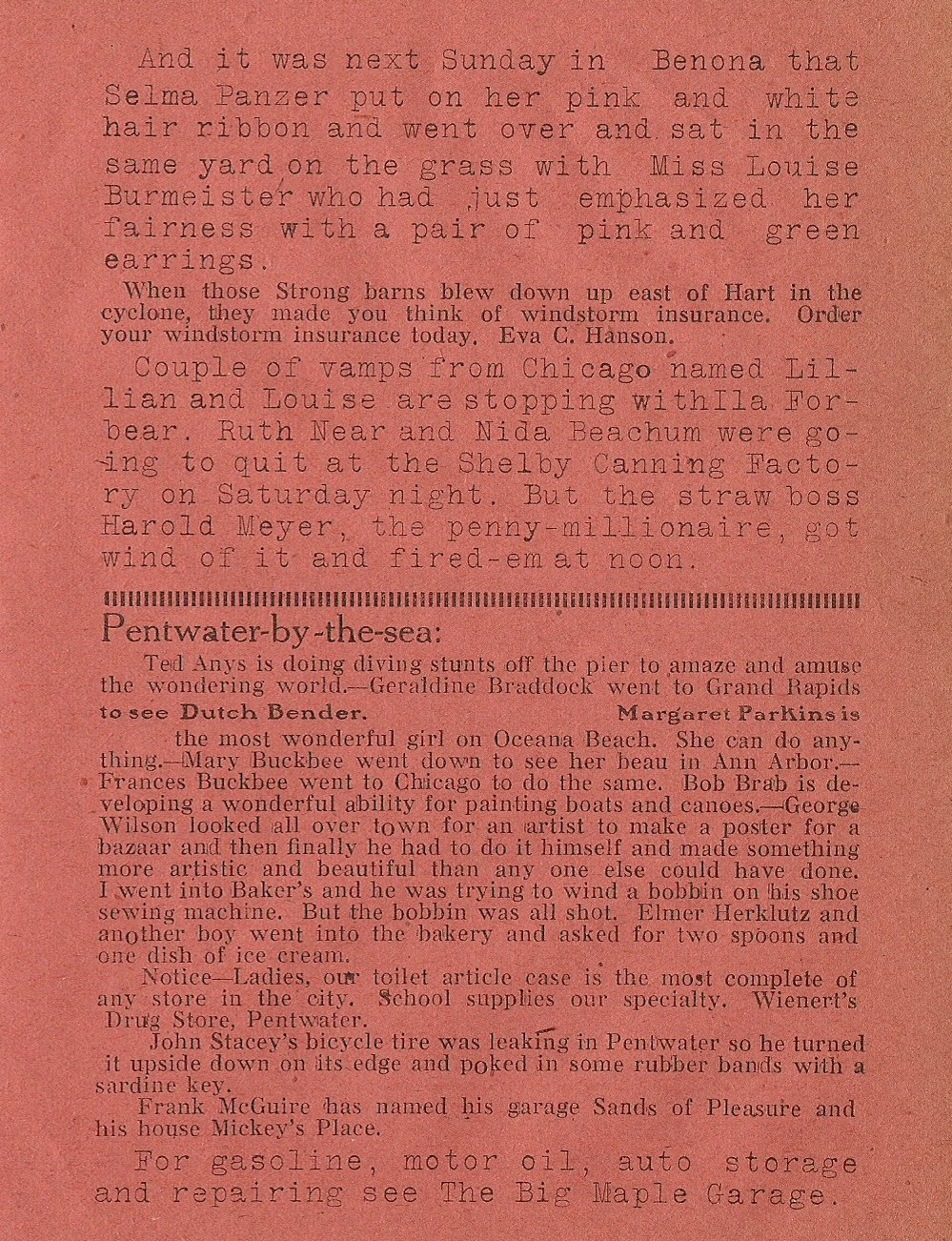

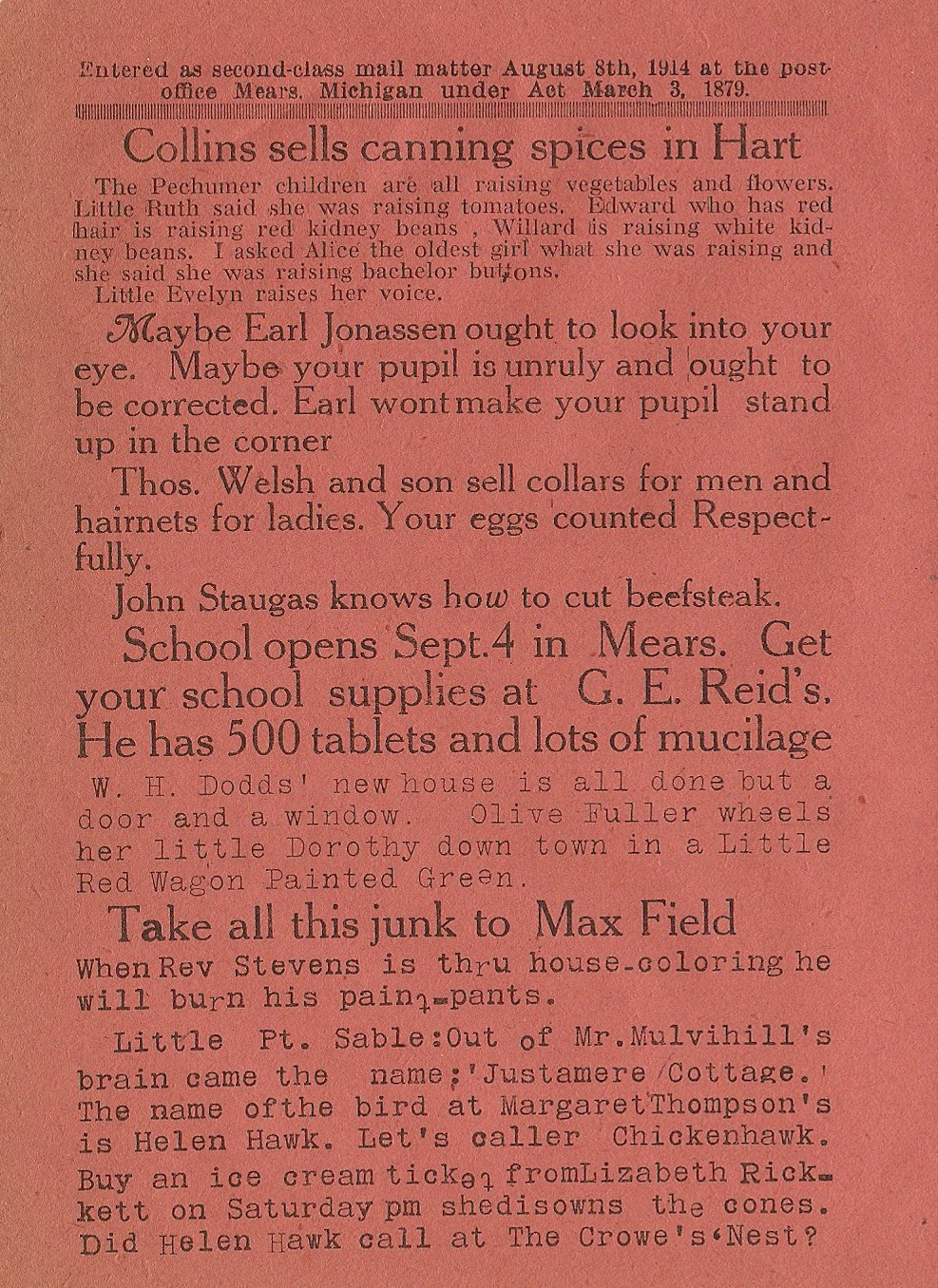

The Mears News next to a standard United States Post Office issued postcard.

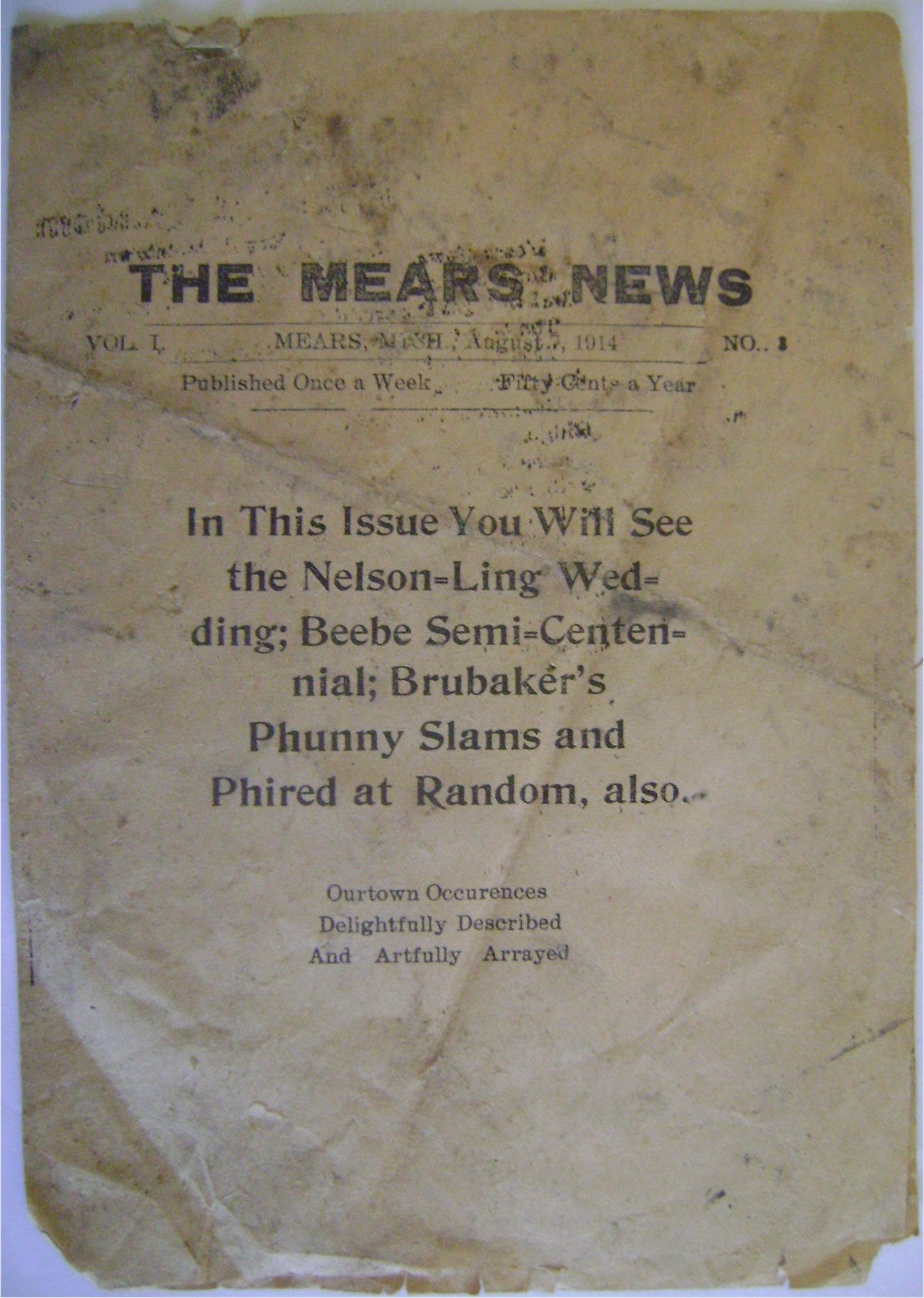
The Mears News of August 7, 1914

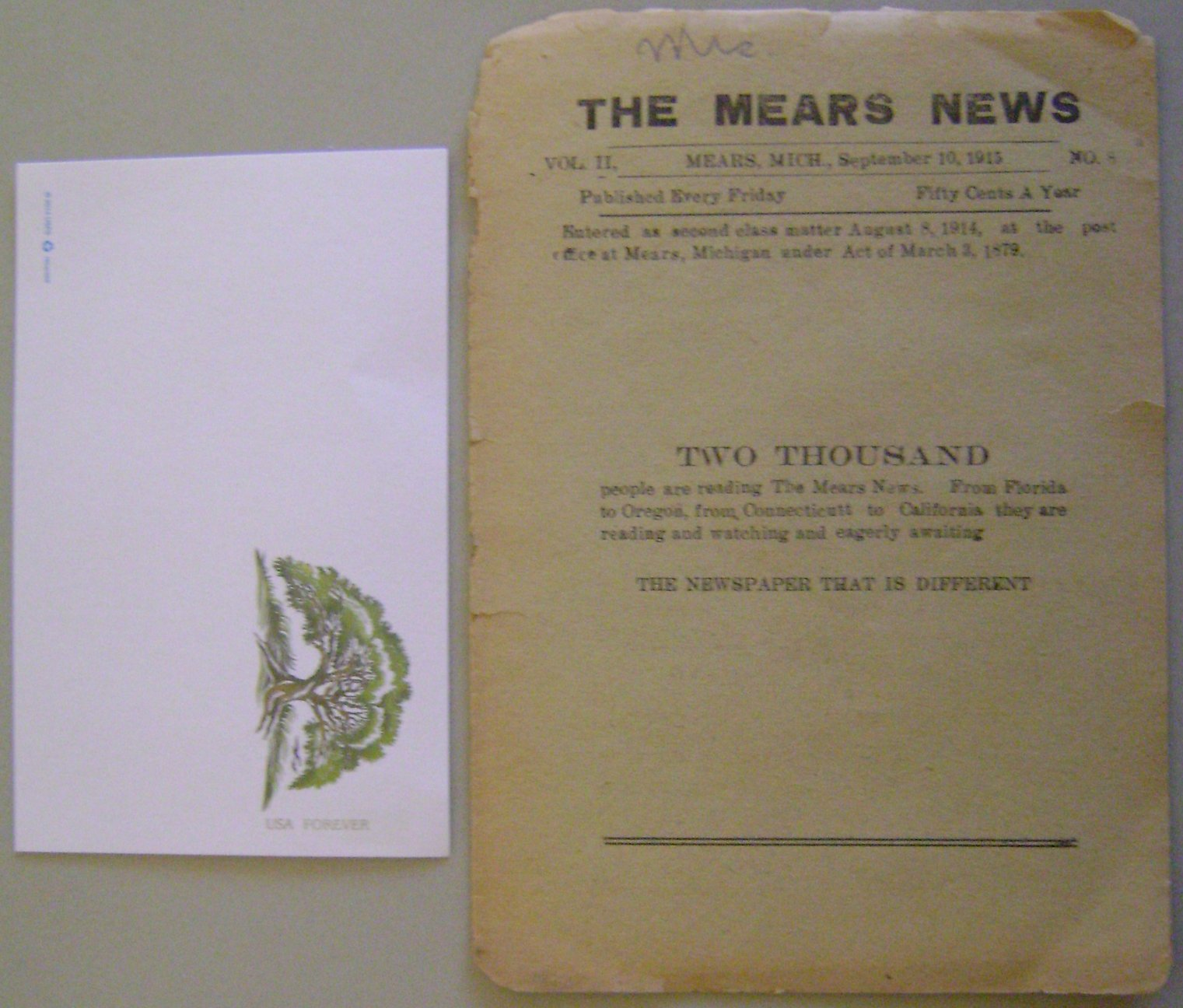

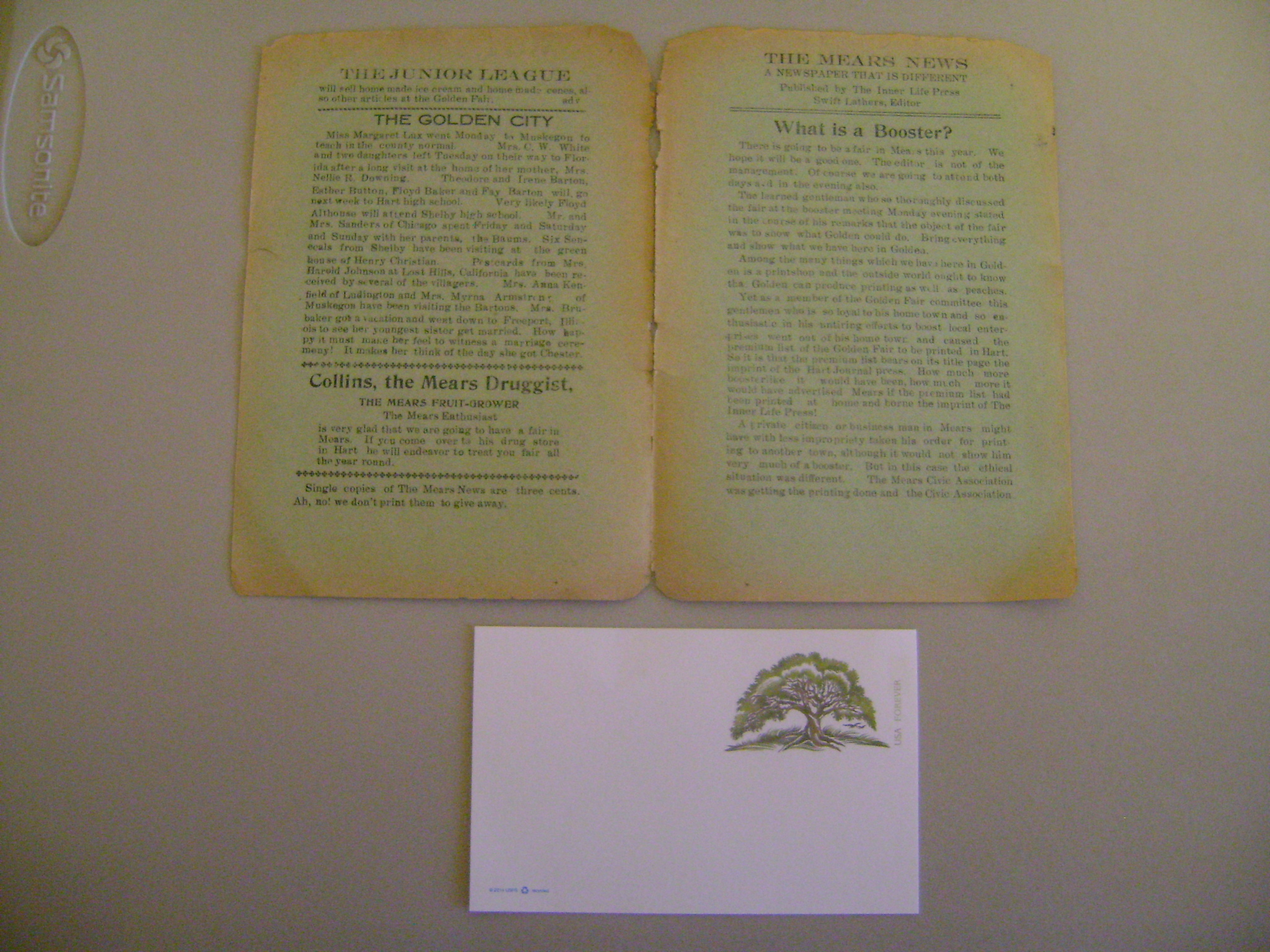
pages 2 & 3 with postcard

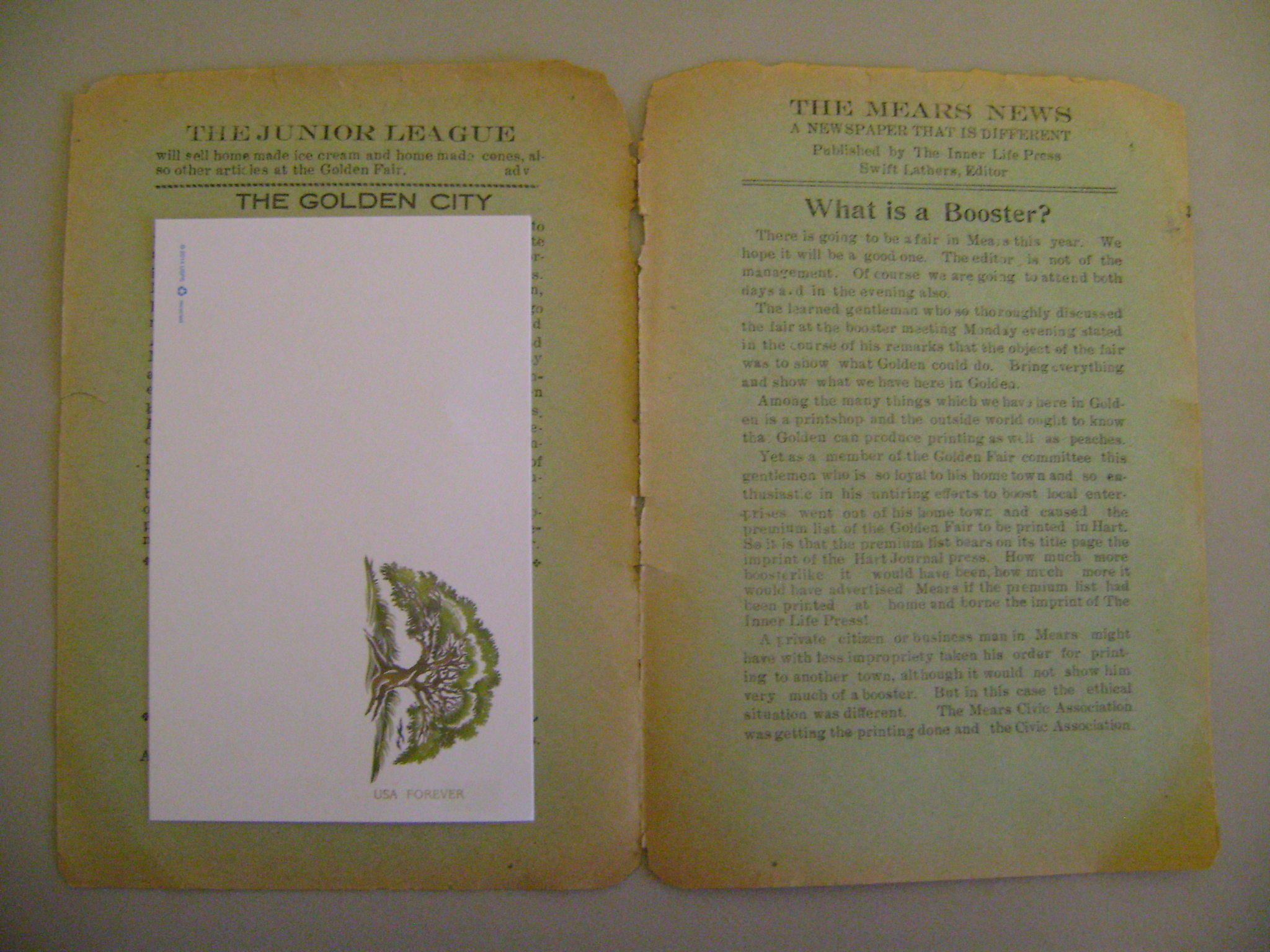
USPS postcard over pg 2

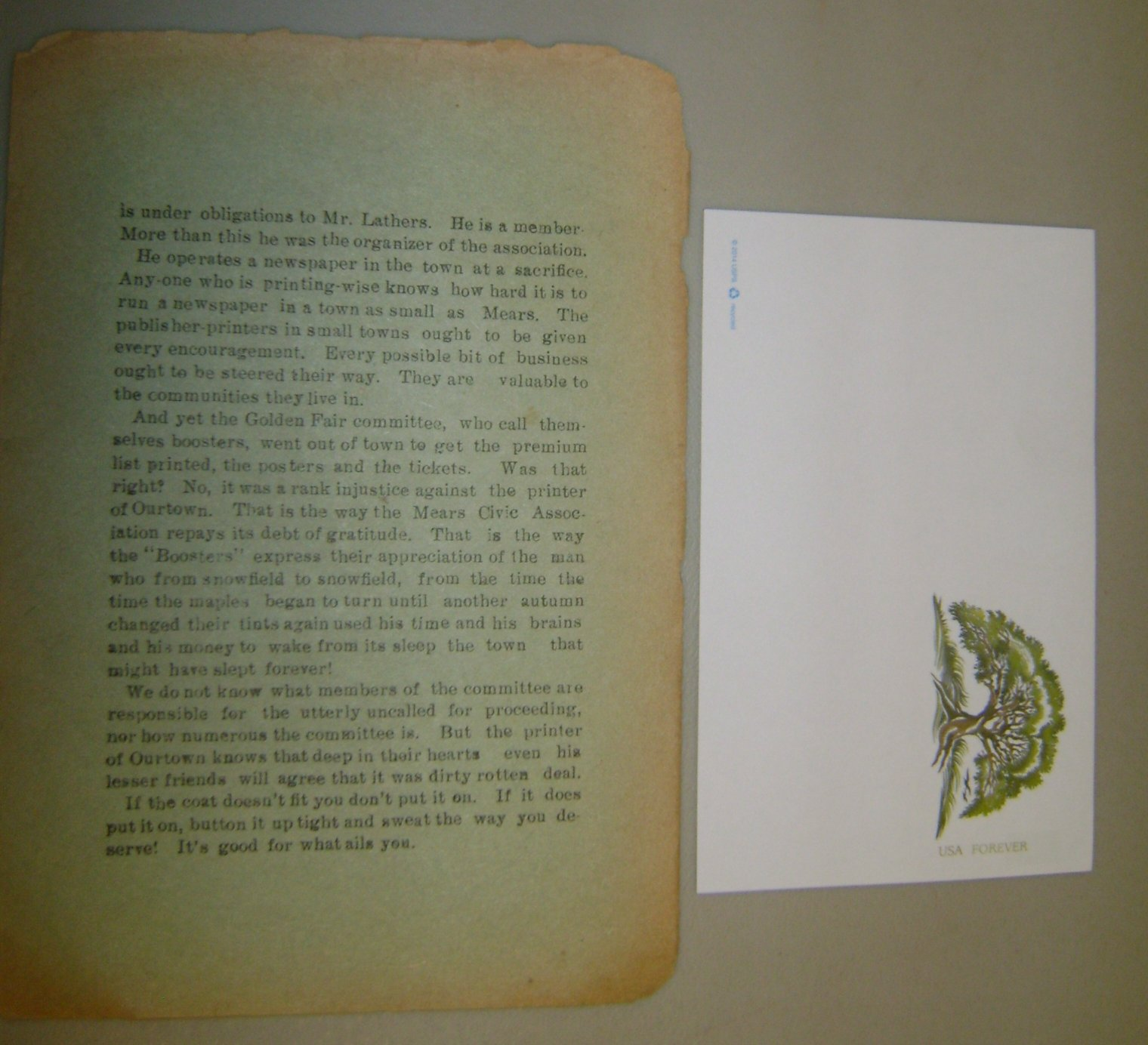

== See also ==
- Swift Lathers

== Sources ==
- Books, Best (1941). Michigan; a Guide to the Wolverine State. Best Books on. ISBN 978-1-62376-021-2.
- Hoogterp, Edward (2006). West Michigan Almanac. University of Michigan Press. ISBN 0-472-03125-2.
- Scott, Gene (2005). Michigan shadow towns: a study of vanishing and vibrant villages. G. Scott.
