= Little Sable Point Light =

Lighthouse in Michigan, United States

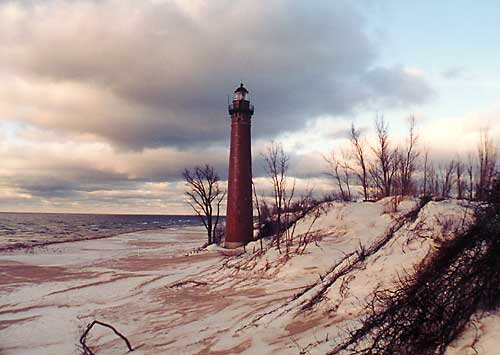
- Listed in National Register of Historic Places
- Location: Ten miles south of Pentwater, Michigan on Lake Michigan, Little Sable Point, Golden Township, Michigan
- Coordinates: 43°39′6″N 86°32′20″W

Tower
- Constructed: 1874
- Foundation: 109 wooden piles, driven into sand
- Construction: Rust brick, Italianate bracketing
- Automated: 1955
- Height: 107 feet (33 m)
- Shape: Frustum of a cone
- Markings: Red brick, natural (orig. white), black trim and lantern
- Heritage: National Register of Historic Places listed place

Light
- First lit: 1874
- Deactivated: 2014
- Focal height: 115 feet (35 m)
- Lens: Third-Order Fresnel lens
- Intensity: 40,000 candlepower
- Range: 15 nautical miles; 27 kilometres (17 mi)
- Characteristic: Flashing white, 1 flash every 6 sec.
- Little Sable Point Light Station (U.S. Coast Guard Light Station/Great Lakes)
- U.S. National Register of Historic Places
- Michigan State Historic Site
- Area: 1 acre (0.40 ha)
- Architect: Col. Orlando M. Poe
- Architectural style: Italianate bracketing
- MPS: U.S. Coast Guard Lighthouses and Light Stations on the Great Lakes TR
- NRHP reference No.: 84001827
- Added to NRHP: July 19, 1984

The Little Sable Point Light is a lighthouse located south of Pentwater in the lower peninsula of the U.S. state of Michigan. It is in the southwest corner of Golden Township, just south of Silver Lake State Park.

The lighthouse was designed by Col. Orlando M. Poe and has been described as "a classic Poe tower." The design used 109 1-foot-diameter wood pilings driven into the sand, capped by 12 feet of stone as a stout base for the brick tower. The walls of the tower are 5 feet (1.5 m) thick at the base and 2 feet (0.61 m) at its zenith.

== History ==
Following the loss of the Schooner Pride in 1866, public outcries for a light at this locale were finally heard and heeded. Congress approved funding in 1871, but construction was delayed until 1874 due to lack of roads to the site.

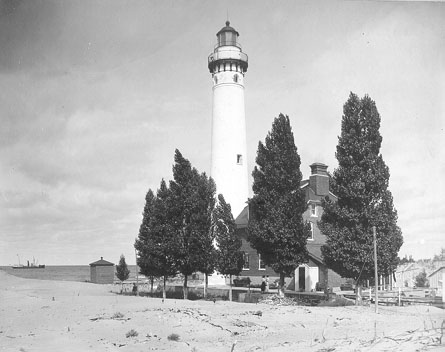
Undated USCG photo

The station was originally named "Petite Pointe Au Sable Lighthouse", which is the name used on most official records; officially, however, the name was changed in 1910. Although commonly called "Little Sable Point Light", it is listed by the National Park Service as "Little Point Sable Light".

The lantern room has eight fixed panels in its lower section, and the upper has ten rotating panels.

In 1954, the Lighthouse keeper's dwelling was destroyed by the Coast Guard when electricity reached the site and the light was automated. "Evidence of the connection between the dwelling and tower are obvious to the visitor."

Prior to 1900, the brick was left in its natural color and state, as it was unusually hard and held up well to the elements. (Unlike its sister, Big Sable Point Light, which was made from Cream City Brick, and had to be encased in steel boilerplate to retard the deterioration.) Having it in natural tones, however, was a boon to the Lighthouse keeper, who did not have to apply a yearly coat of whitewash. In 1900 the light was painted white for the first time, to assuage the complaints of mariners who said the brick was difficult to see. It remained that color until 1975, when it was sand blasted, and returned to its natural color. The lantern is capped by a copper roof.

Big Sable Point Lighthouse (erected in 1867) is the same height, and is several miles to the north. It is distinguishable at night from Little Sable by having a fixed white light, and by day by the Daymark of the tower, being banded in black and white.

For the first time in over 50 years (last open in 1949), in June, 2006, the lighthouse opened to the public, so they can now climb its 139 steps and view the Third Order Fresnel lens (manufactured by Sautter & Co. of Paris) and the panoramic landscape. It is open everyday, from 10:00 a.m. to 5:00 p.m. from the first weekend in June through the end of September.

The presence and continuous use of the original Third Order Fresnel lens makes this a relatively rare light. This is one of only seventy such lenses that are still operational in the United States, sixteen of which are use on the Great Lakes of which eight are in Michigan.

It is listed on the National Register of Historic Places. It is not listed on the State Register, but is in a protected area, i.e., a state park.

== Access ==
Little Sable Point is in Silver Lake State Park, close to Mears, Michigan. The lighthouse parking lot is off of N. Lighthouse Dr. Take Silver Lake Road to its south end, where one will find N. Lighthouse Dr. Follow it a little over a mile. "It has an excellent swimming beach and Lake Michigan produces some great sunsets." There are about 200 parking spaces, but these are shared with beach users. As it is part of a Michigan State Park, an entrance fee is charged for automobiles. "A dollar tower climbing fee helps preserve the lighthouse. Five dollars for children and eight for adults."

== See also ==
- Lighthouses in the United States
