= Etiquette (Casiotone for the Painfully Alone album) =

Studio album by Casiotone for the Painfully Alone
- Released: March 7, 2006
- Recorded: Pan American Recording Studio - San Francisco, CA
- Genre: Lo-fi; Indie; Electronic; Indietronica
- Length: 30:36
- Label: Tomlab; TOM65
- Producer: Jherek Bischoff, Jason Quever

Casiotone for the Painfully Alone chronology
Twinkle Echo (2003)	Etiquette (2006)	Vs. Children (2009)

Professional ratings
Review scores
Source	Rating
AllMusic	3.5/5 stars
Pitchfork Media	(7.7/10)
Prefix	(7/10)
Tiny Mix Tapes	3.5/5 marks

Etiquette is a studio album by Casiotone for the Painfully Alone, released in 2006. Etiquette is thought by many to have slightly abandoned the simple lo-fi "made in a basement" sound by including a more diverse range of instruments and a marginally higher production quality than previous albums.

== Track listing ==
1. "Etiquette I.D." – 0:05
2. "New Year's Kiss" – 2:02
3. "Young Shields" – 3:04
4. "I Love Creedence" – 2:33
5. "Nashville Parthenon" – 2:55
6. "Scattered Pearls" – 2:42
7. "Happy Mother's Day" – 0:47
8. "Holly Hobby (version)" – 2:43
9. "Cold White Christmas" – 4:56
10. "Bobby Malone Moves Home" – 3:14
11. "Don't They Have Payphones Wherever You Were Last Night" – 2:21
12. "Love Connection" (Parenthetical Girls cover) – 3:14
