= Answerphone (Nicholas McDonald song) =

Single by Nicholas McDonald

from the album In the Arms of an Angel
- Released: 16 March 2014
- Recorded: January 2014
- Genre: Bubblegum pop
- Length: 3:15
- Label: RCA
- Songwriters: Nicholas McDonald, Paul Barry

Nicholas McDonald singles chronology
"Answerphone" (2014)	"Limelight" (2018)

"Answerphone" is the debut single by Scottish singer Nicholas McDonald, who finished as the runner-up on the tenth series of The X Factor in 2013. It was written by McDonald alongside Paul Barry. It was released on 16 March 2014 as the lead single from McDonald's debut studio album In the Arms of an Angel (2014). The song peaked at number 73 on the UK Singles Chart and number 28 on the Scottish Singles Chart.

== Background ==
After finishing as runner-up on the tenth series of The X Factor in December 2013, McDonald signed a record contract with RCA Records. "Answerphone" was one of three original tracks written for his debut studio album In the Arms of an Angel. The song was co-written by McDonald and Paul Barry. McDonald stated that, "I chose that as my first song because it's a really original, fresh and fun song. It's a song that I knew I would enjoy performing."

In an interview with sugarscape.com, McDonald said that "'Answerphone' is about me being in the studio, working hard, doing my thing and I've got a girlfriend during this, this work in progress - something happens and I'm trying to get a hold of her, she's trying to get a hold of me. I just keep checking my phone, like 'where is she?' and 'what have I done?'. I'm just like in this video going 'what have I done wrong?' and 'what's happening?' Basically, then she turns up at the door with a phone like 'I've been trying to call you when you've been trying to call me'."

The track received its debut airplay on 3 February 2014 on the Clyde 1 Breakfast Show with George Bowie.

== Music video ==
The music video was filmed on 5 February 2014. McDonald took a break from rehearsals for the X Factor Live Tour in order to film the video. He said on Twitter, "Access all areas #Answerphone video shoot.", before later adding "AND THATS A WRAP !!! MUSIC VIDEO FOR ANSWERPHONE IS ALL DONE !! NOW LETS HOPE ALL THAT HARD WORK WAS WORTH IT #answerphone !!!" The video premiered on McDonald's Vevo channel and YouTube on 18 February.

== Track listing ==
Digital download
No.	Title	Length
1.	"Answerphone"	3:13

== Chart performance ==
The song debuted at number 73 on the UK Singles Chart on 23 March 2014. It was a major flop in comparison to In the Arms of an Angel, which debuted at number six on the UK Albums Chart the same week. The song also charted at number 28 on the Scottish Singles Chart.

== Charts ==
Chart (2014)	Peak position
Scottish Singles Sales (Official Charts)	28
UK Singles (Official Charts Company)	73
UK Download Singles (Official Charts Company)	90

== Release history ==
Region	Date	Format	Label
United Kingdom	3 February 2014	Radio premiere	RCA
Ireland	14 March 2014	CD, digital download	RCA
United Kingdom	16 March 2014	CD, digital download	RCA
