= Pocket Symphonies =

American indie rock band

- Origin: Austin, Texas, United States
- Genres: Indie rock
- Years active: 2000–present
- Labels: Bubble Empire Recordings
- Members: Paul Etheredge; Sean Beckius; Brian Reed; Jason Buntz
- Past members: Trina Mann

Pocket Symphonies is an American, Austin indie rock band, formed in 2000. Their debut album Leaving Is Believing was well received by the Austin Chronicle. Also, the recording of the album attracted Fastball vocalist Tony Scalzo and Young Heart Attack guitarist Chris "Frenchie" Smith, both who took part in the recording. The Pocket Symphonies are currently recording their next album Echo Park which was released in 2006.

The members of the band are Paul Etheredge on vocals and keyboards, Sean Beckius on bass, Brian Reed on drums, and Jason Buntz on guitar.

== Discography ==
=== Albums ===
- Leaving Is Believing (2002)
- Echo Park 2006)
