= Pocket Symphonies for Lonesome Subway Cars =

Studio album by Casiotone for the Painfully Alone
- Released: 2001
- Genre: Lo-fi, indie, electronic
- Length: 34:18
- Label: Tomlab; TOM16
- Producer: Owen Ashworth

Casiotone for the Painfully Alone chronology
Answering Machine Music (1999)	Pocket Symphonies for Lonesome Subway Cars (2001)	Twinkle Echo (2003)

Professional ratings
Review scores
Source	Rating
Allmusic	link

Pocket Symphonies for Lonesome Subway Cars is an album by Casiotone for the Painfully Alone, released in 2001. This album was reissued and remastered in 2005 accompanying Answering Machine Music as a single CD entitled The First Two Albums. The song "Yr Boyfriend" was covered by Welsh indie pop group Los Campesinos! as a b-side to their 2008 single "My Year in Lists".

== Track listing ==
1. "We Have Mice" – 2:00
2. "Tonight Was a Disaster" – 1:48
3. "Suitcase in Hand" – 2:25
4. "Caltrain Song" – 2:18
5. "Dying Batteries" – 0:50
6. "Oh, Contessa!" – 3:26
7. "Bus Song" – 3:10
8. "Yr Boyfriend" – 0:54
9. "Casiotone for the Painfully Alone in a Green Cotton Sweater" – 2:18
10. "Number Ten" – 1:29
11. "Destroy the Evidence" – 3:42
12. "Lesley Gore on the TAMI Show" – 2:14
13. "Oh, Illinois!" – 1:55
14. "The Subway Home" – 2:45
15. "Airport Samba" – 1:08
16. "We Have Mice (Boombox Version)" – 1:56
