= Evangeline Records =

American record label

Evangeline Records is an independent American record label based in San Francisco, California that promotes and releases music in the indie rock, baroque pop, psychedelic folk, and Americana genres. The label was founded by notable songwriters Bob Frank and John Murry in 2006. Artists on the label include Bob Frank and John Murry, Jeffrey Luck Lucas, Kira Lynn Cain, Christine Shields, Danny Pearson, Birdgang, Ryan Auffenberg, Chuck Prophet

== History ==
Frank and Murry were both raised in the American South and moved to the San Francisco Bay Area. Initially, it was a vehicle for the duo's own work. Their critically acclaimed "World Without End" received international recognition and got them a European record deal, however they were unable to secure a suitable record deal in the United States. The label's first release was "World Without End", coming in July 2007 several months after its European debut on Decor Records.

The name for the label comes from John Murry's daughter born in 2004, named Evangeline after the tale by Longfellow and of Acadian and Cajun history. Following its release, additional artists were signed to the roster. Most of the artists are based in the San Francisco Bay Area, with the exception being Zach Roberts, known as 'Birdgang'. Most of the artists have some folk or Americana influence and have a somewhat dark, cinematic sound. The label offices are located at 1441 Howard Street, home of Closer Recording studios, owned by producer and engineer Tim Mooney, the former drummer for American Music Club, The Toiling Midgets, and The Sleepers.

The majority of the records released by or to be released by the label have been recorded there and many of the same musicians have collaborated on these recordings. The label views itself as a collective that is influenced by and is attempting to recreate the spirit of Stax, Motown, Muscle Shoals, and Sun Records. Musicians such as Sean Coleman, Tim Mooney, John Murry, Nate Cavalieri, and Quinn Miller have appeared on a number of these recordings and Sean Coleman has engineered two of them and produced and engineered one, Kira Lynn Cain's "The Ideal Hunter", released in May 2008.

The record label was purchased in 2011 by Lori Graves Murry and reopened as Evangeline Recording Company. It is still a Bay Area-based independent label operating out of Oakland, CA. Most of the previous artists remain on the roster of the new label and the first scheduled releases under the new label name are scheduled for January 2012. The back catalog is available through the Evangeline Recording Co website.
