= United Kingdom (album) =

Studio album by American Music Club
- Released: 1989
- Genres: Indie rock; slowcore; Americana
- Length: 33:11
- Labels: Frontier; Demon
- Producer: Tom Mallon

American Music Club chronology
California (1988)	United Kingdom (1989)	Everclear (1991)

Professional ratings
Review scores
Source	Rating
AllMusic	4.5/5 stars
NME	8/10
Spin Alternative Record Guide	4/10

United Kingdom is the fourth studio album by American indie rock band American Music Club. It was released exclusively in the United Kingdom in 1989 on Frontier Records and Demon Records. The album was recorded primarily for the country, where the band had a larger following than in their native United States, and consists of a mixture of studio and live tracks. United Kingdom was produced by Tom Mallon, who also produced the band's previous three LPs, The Restless Stranger, Engine and California.

United Kingdom contains the song "Kathleen", the most obvious of many that Mark Eitzel has composed about his long-term muse, Kathleen Burns.

== Track listing ==
All tracks are written by Mark Eitzel.

No.	Title	Length
1.	"Here They Roll Down"	4:12
2.	"Dreamers of the Dream"	2:59
3.	"Never Mind" (Live at the Hotel Utah)	4:05
4.	"United Kingdom"	4:20
5.	"Dream Is Gone"	3:55
6.	"Heaven of Your Hands"	3:01
7.	"Kathleen" (Live at the Hotel Utah)	2:20
8.	"The Hula Maiden" (Live at the Hotel Utah)	4:59
9.	"Animal Pen"	3:20

== Personnel ==
American Music Club

- Mark Eitzel – vocals, guitar
- Tom Mallon – bass, production
- Mike Simms – drums
- Vudi – guitar, accordion, backing vocals

Additional musicians

- Charles Gillingham – piano
- Bruce Kaphan – pedal steel

Artwork and design

- Kathleen Burns – cover photography
