= San Francisco (American Music Club album) =

Studio album by American Music Club
- Released: October 1994
- Recorded: 1994
- Genres: Indie rock, slowcore
- Length: 60:50
- Label: Reprise (released on Virgin Records in the U.K.)
- Producer: Joe Chiccarelli/American Music Club

American Music Club chronology
Mercury (1993)	San Francisco (1994)	Love Songs for Patriots (2004)

Professional ratings
Review scores
Source	Rating
Allmusic	3/5 stars
Chicago Tribune	3/4 stars
Christgau's Consumer Guide	(dud)
The Encyclopedia of Popular Music	3/5 stars
Rolling Stone	4/5 stars
Spin Alternative Record Guide	8/10

San Francisco was the seventh album by American Music Club and their last before a nine-year hiatus.

== Track listing ==
All songs written by Mark Eitzel.

1. "Fearless" - 4:34
2. "It's Your Birthday" - 4:33
3. "Can You Help Me" - 3:11
4. "Love Doesn't Belong" - 4:22
5. "Wish the World Away" - 3:09
6. "How Many Six Packs Does It Take to Screw in a Light" - 4:15
7. "Cape Canaveral" - 5:04
8. "Hello Amsterdam" - 3:29
9. "The Revolving Door" - 4:47
10. "In the Shadow of the Valley" - 6:28
11. "What Holds the World Together" - 4:44
12. "I Broke My Promise" - 3:37
13. "The Thorn in My Side Is Gone" - 4:41
14. "I'll Be Gone" - 3:56
15. "California Dreamin'" (unlisted on CD) - 2:34

== Personnel ==
- Mark Eitzel - Vocals; guitars
- Vudi - Guitars; backing vocals
- Tim Mooney - Drums; guitar; backing vocals
- Dan Pearson - Bass; guitar; mandolin; backing vocals
- Bruce Kaphan - Pedal steel; keyboards; guitar; tablas; backing vocals
- Omewenne - Background vocals on Hello Amsterdam
- Bill Ortiz - Trumpet on It's Your Birthday
- Jean Lowe - Cover painting
