= Mercury (American Music Club album) =

Studio album by American Music Club
- Released: March 1993
- Recorded: November–December 1992
- Studios: Sunset Sound Factory (Hollywood, California)
- Genres: Slowcore; indie rock
- Length: 49:37
- Labels: Reprise; Virgin
- Producer: Mitchell Froom

American Music Club chronology
Everclear (1991)	Mercury (1993)	San Francisco (1994)

Singles from Mercury
- 1. "Johnny Mathis' Feet" Released: 1993; 2. "Keep Me Around" Released: 1993

Mercury is the sixth studio album by American indie rock band American Music Club. It was released in March 1993 on Reprise Records as their major-label debut, while Virgin Records released the album in the United Kingdom.

"I've Been a Mess" remained a staple of the band's concerts. The album's title comes from a beverage featured in the lyrics of "Challenger."

== Release ==
"Johnny Mathis' Feet" and "Keep Me Around" were released as singles from Mercury. The "Johnny Mathis' Feet" CD had a 10-track bonus live CD; it was recorded at Slim's in San Francisco on June 15, 1993, and is usually called Live at Slim's.

A black-and-white 11-minute promotional VHS tape, generally referred to as "1992 press kit," was issued in advance of the album's release. This contained interviews with each band member, live performances, studio footage, and assorted clips, including of Mark Eitzel riding his bike by the ocean. The band members talk at length about the origins of American Music Club, with two of them commenting on how scary it is to be in the band.

== Critical reception ==
Professional ratings
Review scores
Source	Rating
AllMusic	4/5 stars
Chicago Tribune	3/4 stars
Christgau's Consumer Guide	B−
Los Angeles Times	3.5/4 stars
NME	9/10
The Philadelphia Inquirer	3.5/4 stars
Q	4/5 stars
Rolling Stone	4/5 stars
Select	4/5
Spin Alternative Record Guide	7/10

Spin magazine ranked Mercury the 14th best album of 1993 describing the album as a "lushly arranged collision between indie rock and adult-alternative music". Treble ranked the album among the "10 Essential Slowcore Albums".

== Legacy ==
In a retrospective "On Second Thought" feature for Stylus Magazine, critic Todd Hutlock wrote that "the rock-solid ensemble musicianship and straightforward production... let in just enough light to let Eitzel's darkness contrast but not overwhelm things."

Franz Nicolay of the Hold Steady has cited Mercury as one of his biggest musical influences.

== Track listing ==
All tracks are written by Mark Eitzel.

No.	Title	Length
1.	"Gratitude Walks"	4:14
2.	"If I Had a Hammer"	3:36
3.	"Challenger"	2:57
4.	"I've Been a Mess"	4:24
5.	"Hollywood 4-5-92"	4:12
6.	"What Godzilla Said to God When His Name Wasn't Found in the Book of Life"	3:40
7.	"Keep Me Around"	2:53
8.	"Dallas, Airports, Bodybags"	2:00
9.	"Apology for an Accident"	3:57
10.	"Over and Done"	3:05
11.	"Johnny Mathis' Feet"	3:40
12.	"The Hopes and Dreams of Heaven's 10,000 Whores"	4:20
13.	"More Hopes and Dreams"	1:55
14.	"Will You Find Me?"	4:06

== Personnel ==
American Music Club

- Mark Eitzel
- Bruce Kaphan
- Tim Mooney
- Daniel Pearson
- Vudi

Production

- Tchad Blake – engineering, mixing
- Mitchell Froom – production
- John Paterno – assistant engineer, additional engineering on "Over and Done"
- Bob Ludwig – mastering

Artwork and design

- Bobby Neal Adams – cover and inlay photography
- Jeff Gold – art direction
- Tom Recchion – art direction, design
- Ralf Strathmann – other photography

Management

- Wally Brill – management for Building Management
- Ross Schwartz – management for Building Management

Production notes

- All songs recorded and mixed at Sunset Sound Factory, Hollywood, November–December 1992, and mastered at Gateway Mastering.

== Charts ==
Chart (1993)	Peak position
UK Albums (Official Charts)	41
