= Negative Trend (EP) =

EP by Negative Trend
- Released: September 1978
- Recorded: June 1978
- Genre: Punk rock, hardcore punk
- Length: 11:26
- Language: English
- Label: Heavy Manners
- Producer: Debbie Dub; Negative Trend

Alternate cover art
- 1983 reissue as We Don't Play, We Riot.

Negative Trend is the debut EP and the only stand-alone official release by American punk rock band Negative Trend.

== Production ==
Produced by Debbie Dub and the band, Negative Trend was recorded and mixed in June 1978, in a process which took only two days.

== Release ==
Negative Trend was originally released in September 1978 on the label Heavy Manners in 7-inch vinyl disc format. (Note: Heavy Manners #HM-1) Only 1,000 copies of this edition were pressed.

== Critical reception ==
Professional ratings
Review scores
Source	Rating
AllMusic	4/5 stars
Punknews	5/5 stars

Matt Whalley of AllMusic retrospectively lauded the EP as being some of America's finest punk music and credited it as being "a surprisingly powerful and gifted piece of American punk history". He gave it 4 out of 5 stars, concluding that Negative Trend "is a complete package that puts one of America's least appreciated punk bands on display".

== Reissues ==
In December 1983, Negative Trend was reissued by Subterranean Records, (Note: Subterranean #SUB 32) this time in 12-inch vinyl disc format, under the title We Don't Play, We Riot and featuring alternate cover art, taken from a Negative Trend flyer designed by band's bassist Will Shatter for a gig, shared with Readymades and Avengers, held at the Mabuhay Gardens on December 30, 1977.

In April 2006, a new edition, remastered by Steven Tupper at Fantasy Studios in Berkeley, California, was released on CD via Henry Rollins' label 2.13.61 Records. (Note: 2.13.61 #213CD1705)

In 2005, Rollins commented about this release:

"About 25 years ago, I found a single ... that has remained one of my favorite 7" records of all time: The Negative Trend EP. ... Over the years I would see the Negative Trend record here and there, mostly bootlegged versions of the 7" and the occasional copy of the 12" re-release. At one point in the late 1990s, I asked the band's drummer Steve DePace what was happening with the Negative Trend record and told him if I ever found out where the master tapes were, I was going to put that record out so everyone could hear it. Early this year, I found them and we're releasing the EP on CD. ... The tape held up over all these years and the mastering is fantastic. The Negative Trend EP never sounded better. I am so excited to be releasing this record on my label."

All previous editions would eventually go out of print. However, as of 2006, individual tracks were made available as digital downloads.

In late 2013, 35 years after its debut, Negative Trend was remastered, again at Fantasy Studios but this time by its chief mastering engineer George Horn, for a reissue in its original 7-inch vinyl disc format and cover art (Note: Although it didn't come with the original disc labels and lyrics insert.) on Superior Viaduct, (Note: Superior Viaduct #SV038) an archival record label.

== Re-recordings ==
In November 1978, "Mercenaries", "Meathouse" and "Black and Red" were re-recorded, along with the new songs "I Got Power" and "Atomic Lawn", all of them as demo versions, by the third lineup of Negative Trend, featuring Richard Elerick (pka Rik L Rik) (Note: Former lead singer of the short-lived West Covina band F-Word!) on vocals, and Tim Mooney on drums, (Note: Former drummer of the Sleepers.) in a six-hour session produced by Robbie Fields from Posh Boy Records at Media Art Studio in Hermosa Beach, California. This was the last time the band went into a recording studio.

In mid-1979, the L.A.-based Upsetter Records issued the Tooth and Nail (Note: Upsetter #UP WR 1&2) compilation, featuring Chris Desjardins and Rik L Rik's remixed versions (Note: Done at Media Art Studio in Hermosa Beach, California. "I Got Power" was also overdubbed with new vocals by Rik L Rik.) of the Posh Boy demo recordings of "Mercenaries" and "I Got Power".

Following that, Posh Boy decided to remix (Note: At Media Art Studio in Hermosa Beach, California.) all five demos from the November 1978 session, adding bass overdubs, as well as a new guitar track on "Atomic Lawn", by Jay Lansford. Shortly after, Posh Boy issued the single "Meat House", (Note: Posh Boy #PBS 4) (Note: "Meathouse" is spelled "Meat House" in Rik L Rik's releases.) initially conceived for Negative Trend, as the first Rik L Rik stand-alone release after he quit the band. This 7-inch pressing on white vinyl featured the Posh Boy remixed versions of "Meathouse" and "I Got Power". In the summer of 1979, the five Posh Boy remixes were included on the label's compilation LP Beach Blvd. (Note: Posh Boy #PBS 102) The recordings were credited to Rik L Rik.

In 1982, Rik L Rik, backed by members of the Gleaming Spires (an offshoot of the Sparks), re-recorded "Mercenaries" and "I Got Power" for the soundtrack of a horror short film titled The Bishop of Battle, starring Emilio Estevez as a video game-addicted teenager who listens to punk rock. Written by Christopher Crowe and directed by Joseph Sargent, the story was originally conceived and shot for the short-lived Universal Television TV series Darkroom, but it was never broadcast because its producers deemed it too intense for TV audiences. However, in 1983, the following year after the show was canceled, the tale was included, along with other three never-aired Darkroom episodes, in Sargent's anthology film Nightmares, released theatrically in September of that year. The music featured in the movie has never been released on a soundtrack album.

In 1997, Rik L Rik re-recorded "Meathouse" and "I Got Power" with New Jersey band Electric Frankenstein for their album Rock 'n' Roll Monster (Note: Au Go Go #ANDA 245) released by Australian label Au Go Go Records.

The following year, the live EP Electric Frankenstein with Rik L Rik, (Note: Munster #MR7115) issued by the Spanish label Munster Records, featured live versions of "Meathouse" and "I Got Power".

In November 2011, Posh Boy compiled the two Negative Trend tracks on Tooth and Nail, along with their five cuts (credited to Rik L Rik) from Beach Blvd, as a downloadable digital audio collection titled November 1978.

== Track listing ==
Side A
No.	Title	Lyrics/Music	Length
1.	"Mercenaries"	Will Shatter/Craig Gray	2:51
2.	"Meathouse"	Shatter/Gray	3:05

Side B
No.	Title	Lyrics/Music	Length
1.	"Black and Red"	Gray	3:38
2.	"How Ya Feelin'"	Mikal Waters/Craig Gray	1:52
Total length:			11:26

== Personnel ==
Negative Trend

- Mikal Waters – vocals
- Craig Gray – guitar
- Will Shatter – bass, backing vocals
- Steve DePace – drums

Production

- Debbie Dub – co-production
- Negative Trend – co-production
- Stu the Hippy – engineering

Additional production

- Steven Tupper – remastering (2006 CD edition)
- George Horn – remastering (2013 7" reissue)
