= Candy Ass =

Studio album by Mark Eitzel
- Released: October 3, 2005
- Genre: Electronic
- Length: 50:26
- Label: Cooking Vinyl

Mark Eitzel chronology
The Ugly American (2002)	Candy Ass (2005)	Klamath (2009)

Professional ratings
Aggregate scores
Source	Rating
Metacritic	51/100
Review scores
Source	Rating
AllMusic	3/5 stars
Pitchfork	4/10
PopMatters	3/10

Candy Ass is the eighth studio album by American singer-songwriter and lead vocalist of American Music Club, Mark Eitzel. It was released on October 3, 2005, by Cooking Vinyl.

== Critical reception ==
Candy Ass was met with "mixed or average" reviews from critics. At Metacritic, which assigns a weighted average rating out of 100 to reviews from mainstream publications, this release received an average score of 51 based on 11 reviews.

In a review for AllMusic, Mark Deming said: "Candy Ass largely finds Eitzel exploring his interest in electronic music, with most of it apparently recorded by the artist all by his lonesome. While The Invisible Man found Eitzel finding a warmth and humanity deep in his masses of loops and samples, Candy Ass sounds considerably colder and less inviting, and the several instrumental cuts on the album are a severe miscalculation." Ryan Dombal of Pitchfork gave the album a four out of ten rating, calling the release a "bore of a detour". At PopMatters, Zeth Lundy wrote: "Eitzel's amateur electronic dabbling, dated and nondescript, suffocates the already stagnant snippets of recycled melodies and exhausted tempos. Candy Ass has an overabundance of maniacal house, club thumping, and digital depictions of real instrumentation, but none of it ever serves the songs appropriately."

== Track listing ==
All tracks are written by Mark Eitzel.

Candy Ass track listing
No.	Title	Length
1.	"My Pet Rat St. Michael"	3:28
2.	"Cotton Candy Tenth Power"	4:44
3.	"Make Sure They Hear"	5:40
4.	"Sleeping Beauty"	3:41
5.	"A Loving Tribute to My City"	3:47
6.	"Homeland Pastoral"	4:52
7.	"Roll Away My Stone"	3:36
8.	"Green Eyes"	3:15
9.	"Cobh"	3:09
10.	"I Am Fassbinder"	4:26
11.	"Song of the Mole"	3:35
12.	"Guitar Lover"	6:13
Total length:		50:26
