= Klamath (album) =

Studio album by Mark Eitzel
- Released: 2009
- Recorded: 2009
- Genre: Rock
- Length: 43:33
- Label: Decor
- Producer: Mark Eitzel

Mark Eitzel chronology
| Candy Ass (2005) | Klamath (2009) | Brannan Street (2010) |

Professional ratings
Review scores
| Source | Rating |
|---|---|
| Drowned in Sound | 7/10 |
| Rolling Stone | 4/5 stars |

Klamath is an album by the American Music Club singer/songwriter Mark Eitzel. Released by Decor in 2009, it was his first solo album since Candy Ass, in 2005. All of the songs were written by Eitzel.

Eitzel himself printed and manufactured the album; friends mailed the copies.

== Critical reception ==
The Independent called it "gorgeous and every bit as good as those early American Music Club records." The Herald considered it a "simple, beautiful record."

== Track listing ==
1. "Buried Treasure"
2. "Like a River That Reaches The Sea"
3. "The Blood on My Hands"
4. "I Miss You"
5. "There's Someone Waiting"
6. "What Do You Got for Me"
7. "The White of Gold"
8. "I Live in This Place"
9. "Why I'm Bullshit"
10. "Remember"
11. "Antennas"
12. "Ronald Koal was a Rock Star"
