= Theatre of Sheep =

- Origin: Portland, Oregon, United States
- Genres: New wave
- Years active: 1982–1984, 2007, 2010
- Label: Sheepish

Theatre of Sheep was an American new wave band from Portland, Oregon, formed in 1982. They were popular locally but never made the jump to a wider audience.

== History ==
Theatre of Sheep formed in 1980 with a line-up of Rozz Rezabek (formerly of Negative Trend), Jimi Haskett (guitar), Brian Wassman (drums), John (Clifford) Goins (bass) and Lesli Arbuthnot (keyboards). Bassist Jim Wallace then replaced Goins. Their 1983 cassette-only release, A Cathartic Aquacade, was produced and engineered by Greg Sage, leader of Portland punk band the Wipers.

Theatre of Sheep's debut 12" extended play, A Quiet Crusade, was released on their own Sheepish label in 1983, followed by a cassette-only collection, Theatre of Sheep's Greatest Hits.

The band broke up in 1984.

== Other projects ==
Rezabek later released several solo recordings, including the 1999 album Lover Legend Liar, and appeared in the 1998 documentary film Kurt & Courtney.

== Legacy and reunions ==
Theatre of Sheep were documented with the 2006 compilation album Old Flames.

The band reunited for Portland shows at Slabtown in 2007. and the closing of Satyricon in 2010.

== Members ==
- Rozz Rezabek – vocals (1980-1984, 2007, 2010)
- Jimi Haskett – guitar (1980-1984, 2007, 2010)
- Brian Wassman – drums (1980-1984)
- Lesli Arbuthnot – keyboards (1980-1984, 2007, 2010)
- John (Clifford) Goins – bass (1980)
- Jim Wallace – bass/keyboards (1983, 2007, 2010)
- Mark Sten – bass
- Rob Ohearn – keyboards
- Kevin Jarvis – drums

== Discography ==
=== EPs ===
- A Cathartic Aquacade cassette (1983, self-released)
- A Quiet Crusade 12" (1983, Sheepish)

=== Compilation albums ===
- Theatre of Sheep's Greatest Hits cassette (1984, Sheepish)
- Old Flames (2007, self-released)
