= Don't Be a Stranger =

Don't Be a Stranger may refer to:

- Don't Be a Stranger (Preston Reed album), a 1982 album by Preston Reed
- Don't Be a Stranger (Mark Eitzel album), a 2012 album by Mark Eitzel
- Don't Be a Stranger (Dina Carroll song), a 1993 song by Dina Carroll
