= Negative Trend =

American punk rock band

- Negative Trend at the Mabuhay Gardens in 1978. From left to right are Craig Gray, Steve DePace, Mikal Waters, and Will Shatter.

Background information
- Origin: San Francisco, California, U.S.
- Genres: Punk rock, hardcore punk
- Years active: 1977–1979, 2008–2010
- Labels: Heavy Manners, Posh Boy, Upsetter
- Past members: Craig Gray; Will Shatter; Todd Robertson; Rozz Rezabek; Mikal Waters; Steve DePace; Rik L Rik; Tim Mooney; Jonathan Henrickson; Ricky Williams; Paul Casteel; Paul Hood; Toby Dick; Tom Mallon; Tony Sales
- Website: negativetrend.net

Negative Trend was an American punk rock band active between 1977 and 1979. Before they disbanded, the band released one self-titled EP in September 1978.

The former members of Negative Trend would go on to start a number of other notable western US punk bands. Soon after the breakup of Negative Trend, bassist Will Shatter and early drummer Steve DePace went on to be founding members of Flipper, while guitarist Craig Gray and drummer Tim Mooney were among the founding members of the Toiling Midgets. Former vocalists Rozz Rezabek and Rik L Rik went on to become notable punk singers in their own right.

== History ==
=== Grand Mal (1977) ===
Grand Mal was a short-lived band which formed in July 1977. Its first lineup consisted of Don Vinil on vocals, Craig Gray on guitar, V. Vale (of Search & Destroy punk zine) on bass, and Todd Robertson on drums. Due to his magazine commitments, Vale quickly left the band and Will Shatter replaced him, despite having no previous musical experience. The quartet played only three gigs, sharing bills with bands such as the Avengers, the Dils, and the Dead Boys. During their last show at the Mabuhay Gardens in San Francisco, California on November 7, 1977, Rozz Rezabek stepped in as the band's new vocalist, after jumping on stage, not allowing Vinil to continue performing. Vinil then left the band to start the Offs, and Grand Mal became Negative Trend.

=== Negative Trend One (1977–1978) ===
On December 14, 1977, the band played their first show under the name Negative Trend at the Mabuhay Gardens. Rozz Rezabek was now the singer of the band, and the rest of the lineup remained the same.

During a show with the Avengers at Iguana Studios, during which Sandy Pearlman was in attendance (although he was really only there to watch the Avengers performance), Rezabek broke his arm while performing on stage after tripping over a microphone cord. Rezabek was notorious for his electrifying performances, oftentimes jumping onto tables and throwing drinks onto the floor.

On January 14, 1978, after playing six shows in the southern United States, the Sex Pistols played their final show at Winterland Arena in San Francisco, California. The day before the show, someone spray painted the walls of Winterland with the words "Negative Trend". Before the Sex Pistols went on, Malcolm McLaren demanded that Bill Graham, who set up the show, allow Negative Trend to go on before the Sex Pistols. Before the show had started, McLaren asked Howie Klein who the worst band in San Francisco was, and Klein responded saying that it was Negative Trend. McLaren told Graham that if the band were not allowed to play, the Sex Pistols would refuse to play. Graham agreed to let Negative Trend go on after the Sex Pistols. However, by the time the Sex Pistols left the stage and Negative Trend got set up, there was nobody left in attendance, so Negative Trend never got to play.

=== Negative Trend Two (1978) ===
In March 1978, Rezabek quit the band, and Shatter and Gray decided to find a new drummer, as Robertson had failed to show up to a few shows. Mikal Waters would end up replacing Rezabek after the band auditioned a few singers at Iguana Studios, and Steve DePace would replace Robertson on drums. This new version of Negative Trend played their first gig on June 1, 1978.

It was this version of Negative Trend that recorded the band's first studio recordings. The eponymous 7-inch EP was produced by Debbie Dub. While the record is much more famous now, Dub and the band had a hard time giving the record away when it was produced. The record was released in September 1978 by the label Heavy Manners. Side one of the record included the tracks "Mercenaries" and "Meathouse", while side two had the tracks "Black and Red" and "How Ya Feelin". The record has been re-released two times, once in December 1983 by Subterranean Records, and again in April 2006 by 2.13.61.

=== Negative Trend Three (1978–1979) ===
In November 1978, Negative Trend needed to find another singer to replace Waters. Gray and Shatter heard that the band F-Word had broken up, and decided to recruit former F-Word singer Rik L Rik for Negative Trend. Gray and Shatter also asked drummer Tim Mooney, previously of the band The Sleepers, to take over for DePace. Shortly after the formation of this version of Negative Trend, the band went to Los Angeles to record five demos for Posh Boy Records. However, the only tracks released under the name Negative Trend from the recordings with Posh Boy Records were "Mercenaries" and "I Got Power" on the Tooth and Nail Compilation LP, released by Upsetter Records in 1979. However, all five of the tracks recorded by Negative Trend for Posh Boy Records were released under the name Rik L Rik on the compilation album Beach Blvd.

=== Negative Trend 3.5 and Break-up (1979) ===
After only a few gigs with the third version of Negative Trend, Shatter quit the band and was replaced by 16-year-old Jonathan Henrickson. After traveling to Austin, Texas to play two shows, Rik decided leave the band. The final three Negative Trend shows had guest singers. The final Negative Trend show took place on April 27, 1979, at Mills College in Oakland, California with The Queer and Dead Kennedys. Ricky Williams did most of the singing at this final show. Mooney, Williams, and Gray would go on to form the band Toiling Midgets.

=== Reformation (2008–2010) ===
In July 2008, DePace put together a version of Negative Trend with himself on drums, Gray on guitar, Paul Hood on bass, and Paul Casteel singing. Rezabek was not asked to perform with the reformed version of the band. After the first gig, Tom Mallon took over Hood's position as bass player. After the second gig, DePace was forced to stop playing due to his commitments with the band Flipper. Tony Sales then replaced DePace on drums. The band went on to play a few more shows before splitting up in 2010.

== Former band members ==
- Craig Gray – guitar
- Will Shatter – bass; died at the age of 31 after an accidental heroin overdose on December 9, 1987
- Todd Robertson – drums
- Rozz Rezabek – vocals
- Mikal Waters – vocals
- Steve DePace – drums
- Rik L Rik – vocals; died at the age of 39 as a result of brain cancer on June 30, 2000
- Tim Mooney – drums
- Jonathan Henrickson – bass
- Ricky Williams – vocals; died of a heroin overdose on November 21, 1992
- Paul Casteel – vocals
- Paul Hood – bass
- Toby Dick – vocals
- Tom Mallon – bass
- Tony Sales – drums

== Discography ==
=== Singles & EPs ===
- Negative Trend, also released as We Don’t Play, We Riot. (1978, Heavy Manners).
- Meat House/I Got Power (released as Rik L Rik) (1979, Posh Boy)
- Atomic Lawn (released as Rik L Rik) (1989, Gift of Life)

=== Various artists compilation appearances ===
- "I Got Power", and "Mercenaries", on Tooth and Nail (1979, Upsetter).
- Beach Blvd (credited to Rik L Rik) (1979, Posh Boy)
- Miners Benefit (2003, White Noise Records)
