= The Ugly American (album) =

Studio album by Mark Eitzel
- Released: 2002
- Genre: Rock
- Label: Thirsty Ear Recordings

Mark Eitzel chronology
Music for Courage and Confidence (2002)	The Ugly American (2002)	Candy Ass (2005)

Professional ratings
Review scores
Source	Rating
AllMusic	4/5 stars
The Encyclopedia of Popular Music	2/5 stars
Pitchfork	7.7/10
Rolling Stone	3/5 stars

The Ugly American is an album by singer/songwriter Mark Eitzel. The second of Eitzel's two covers albums released in 2002 (along with Music for Courage and Confidence), The Ugly American was put out by Thirsty Ear Recordings. It contains new versions of songs Eitzel wrote with his earlier band American Music Club, as arranged by an ensemble of Greek musicians playing in the Rebetiko style.

== Critical reception ==
AllMusic called the album "a fascinating and pleasurable detour that casts some of [Eitzel's] best songs in a new light."

== Track listing ==
1. "Western Sky"
2. "Here They Roll Down"
3. "Jenny"
4. "Nightwatchman"
5. "Take Courage"
6. "Anything"
7. "What Good is Love"
8. "Will You Find Me"
9. "Last Harbor"
10. "Love's Humming"
