= Love Songs for Patriots =

Studio album by American Music Club
- Released: October 12, 2004
- Recorded: October 2003 – March 2004
- Genres: Indie rock; slowcore
- Length: 61:08
- Labels: Merge; Devil in the Woods; Cooking Vinyl
- Producers: Mark Eitzel; Tim Mooney

American Music Club chronology
San Francisco (1994)	Love Songs for Patriots (2004)	The Golden Age (2008)

Singles from Love Songs for Patriots
- 1. "Home" Released: 2004; 2. "Another Morning" Released: 2004; 3. "Ladies and Gentlemen" Released: 2004

Professional ratings
Aggregate scores
Source	Rating
Metacritic	82/100
Review scores
Source	Rating
AllMusic	3.5/5 stars
Blender	4/5 stars
Entertainment Weekly	B+
The Guardian	4/5 stars
The Independent	4/5 stars
NME	8/10
Pitchfork	8.0/10
Q	3/5 stars
Rolling Stone	3/5 stars
Spin	B+

Love Songs for Patriots is the eighth studio album by American indie rock band American Music Club, released on October 12, 2004, by Merge Records and Devil in the Woods in the United States and by Cooking Vinyl in Europe.

American Music Club reformed in 2003 to critical acclaim and recorded Love Songs for Patriots in San Francisco between day jobs and other commitments. The album's songs were all written by Mark Eitzel and many had been performed live by him in solo performances before the band's reformation.

== Track listing ==
1. "Ladies and Gentlemen" – 3:18
2. "Another Morning" – 3:21
3. "Patriot's Heart" – 6:01
4. "Love Is" – 4:27
5. "Job to Do" – 5:04
6. "Only Love Can Set You Free" – 5:55
7. "Mantovani the Mind Reader" – 4:05
8. "Home" – 4:27
9. "Myopic Books" – 3:31
10. "America Loves the Minstrel Show" – 4:21
11. "The Horseshoe Wreath in Bloom" – 4:40
12. "Song of the Rats Leaving the Sinking Ship" – 4:21
13. "The Devil Needs You" – 7:37

The vinyl LP also includes "1000 Miles".

== Personnel ==
American Music Club

- Marc Capelle – piano, organ, brass arrangements
- Mark Eitzel – vocals, guitars
- Tim Mooney – drums
- Dan Pearson – bass guitar
- Vudi – guitars

Additional personnel

- Brad Johnson – paintings and design
- Jude Mooney – band pictures
- Matt Pence – mixing
