= Rozz Rezabek =

- Also known as: Rozz Rezabek-Wright
- Born: June 4, 1960 (age 65)
- Genres: Post-punk, new wave
- Occupation: Musician
- Instrument: Vocals
- Years active: 1977–present
- Labels: Truce, Tombstone Records, Imadethese Records

Rozz Rezabek-Wright (born June 4, 1960), usually Rozz Rezabek, is an American musician based in Portland, Oregon, formerly of San Francisco.

According to Willamette Week, Rezabek "gave ex-flame Courtney Love (once Courtney Harrison) her rocker name; he thrashed backstage with Johnny Rotten at the Sex Pistols' final show, took a teenage Joan Jett to Deep Throat, and shall be remembered in punk histories (his own forthcoming) ever after".

== History ==
=== Negative Trend ===
In 1977, Rezabek formed punk San Francisco-based band Negative Trend with guitarist Craig Gray (later of Toiling Midgets) and bassist Will Shatter (later of Flipper). He left the band in March 1978, prior to their released recordings.

=== Theatre of Sheep ===
In 1980, Rezabek formed Portland new wave band Theatre of Sheep, who were popular locally but never made the jump to a wider audience. Their 1983 cassette-only release, A Cathartic Aquacade, was produced and engineered by Greg Sage, leader of Portland punk band the Wipers. Theatre of Sheep's debut 12-inch extended play, A Quiet Crusade, was released on their own Sheepish label in 1983, followed by a cassette-only collection, Theatre of Sheep's Greatest Hits. The band broke up in 1984. Theatre of Sheep were later documented with the 2006 compilation album Old Flames.

=== Solo work ===
In an attempt to escape ongoing conflicts with several women (one being Love), Rezabek moved back to San Francisco for several years.

Rezabek's first solo release, the Stockholm Today 7-inch EP, was released in 1986 by Truce. A 7-inch single, "Blue Blessing", followed in 1988, issued on Tombstone Records.

He appeared in the 1998 documentary film Kurt & Courtney, which also featured the Theatre of Sheep song "Pyramid's Babylon".

In 1999, Rezabek released his first solo studio album, Lover Legend Liar.

=== Reunions ===
On November 3, 2007, Rezabek performed a set of Negative Trend songs in San Francisco at a Lennon Studios benefit for punk musician Johnny Genocide of No Alternative.

Theatre of Sheep reunited for Portland shows at Slabtown in 2007. and the closing of Satyricon in 2010.
