= Faster (soundtrack) =

Faster (Music from the Motion Picture)

Soundtrack album by Clint Mansell
- Released: November 23, 2010
- Recorded: 2010
- Genres: Film score; electronic; rock; classical
- Length: 54:06
- Label: Lakeshore
- Producers: Clint Mansell; Geoff Foster

Clint Mansell chronology
Farewell (2010)	Faster (2010)	Black Swan (2010)

Faster (Music from the Motion Picture) is the soundtrack album to the 2010 film Faster directed by George Tillman Jr. and starring Dwayne Johnson and Billy Bob Thornton. The album features 16 tracks, with five licensed songs and Clint Mansell's score accompanying the remainder of the album. It was released through Lakeshore Records on November 23, 2010.

== Background ==
Clint Mansell composed the film score for Faster. Tillman chose Mansell after being impressed by his work, particularly for Darren Aronofsky's features and his style of music not being "on-the-face" traditional score which led to his music being in sync with the visuals. After his commitments to Aronofsky's Black Swan (2010) completed by that July, he began scoring the film simultaneously with Last Night (2010).

Tillman visited various music stores in New York City after the release of Notorious (2009) for selecting source music and though unaware of where the songs come from, he would use it in the film, which seemed to work. He felt specific songs from Kenny Rogers and Iggy Pop worked well in the film, which led to their inclusion. Additionally, another song used for the film include "En mi viejo San Juan" (Spanish for, "In my old San Juan") composed by Noel Epinanio Estrada Suárez and sung by Mexican singer and actor, Javier Solís. The soundtrack to the film released through Lakeshore Records on November 23, 2010.

== Reception ==
Christian Clemmensen of Filmtracks wrote "this revenge score could suffer the same fate as its film, generally palatable with glimpses of coolness smothered by extended sequences of quietly discomforting turmoil." William Ruhlmann of AllMusic wrote "Mansell mixes echoing piano pieces with lots of simmering strings to anticipate the violence and speeding cars, and when the action beats kick in, he supports them with rock elements bordering on heavy metal."

Kirk Honeycutt of The Hollywood Reporter wrote "Clint Mansell’s propulsive music and some hard-rock songs egg on the action". Robert Koehler of Variety wrote "Clint Mansell’s score is characteristically intense and jangly." Calling it a "moody, pared-down score", Gabe Toro of IndieWire noted that the album in whole is "a restrained series of cues from the usually-dynamic [Clint] Mansell, perhaps convinced that the project more closely resembled a drama than a grimy action picture." Glen Chapman of Den of Geek summarized that "Pounding schizophrenic rhythms with heavy rock guitars create a damn exciting, pulse pounding score."

== Track listing ==
No.	Title	Artist(s)	Length
1.	"Goodbye My Friend"	Guido & Maurizio De Angelis	4:03
2.	"I Wanna Be Your Dog"	Iggy Pop	4:05
3.	"Just Dropped In (To See What Condition My Condition Was In)"	Kenny Rogers & The First Edition	3:19
4.	"Short Change Hero"	The Heavy	5:21
5.	"Grifos Muertos"	Jeffrey Luck Lucas	3:00
6.	"John the Revelator"	Adewale Akinnuoye-Agbaje	0:54
7.	"Ten Year Stretch"	Clint Mansell	1:49
8.	"History Lesson"	Clint Mansell	3:03
9.	"Predators & Prey"	Clint Mansell	7:01
10.	"Lost Lives"	Clint Mansell	1:53
11.	"Lovers"	Clint Mansell	2:51
12.	"Hospital Visit"	Clint Mansell	4:34
13.	"The Driver Drives"	Clint Mansell	4:27
14.	"Family Matters"	Clint Mansell	2:36
15.	"On a Mission"	Clint Mansell	3:37
16.	"Redemption"	Clint Mansell	1:33
Total length:			54:06

== Personnel ==
Credits adapted from liner notes:

- Music composer – Clint Mansell
- Music producer – Clint Mansell, Geoff Foster
- Orchestrator and conductor – Matt Dunkley
- Orchestra contractor – Isobel Griffiths
- Assistant orchestra contractor – Charlotte Matthews
- Percussion – Frank Ricotti
- Piano – Simon Chamberlain
- Viola – Vicci Wardman
- Recording – Geoff Foster, Tom Bailey
- Mixing – Geoff Foster
- Mastering – Ray Staff
- Copyist – Jill Streater
- Technical assistance – Nigel Weisehan
- Executive producer – George Tillman, Jr., Brian McNelis, Skip Williamson
- Executive in charge of music – Spring Aspers
- A&R – Eric Craig
- Art direction – John Bergin
