= Atwater Afternoon =

Compilation album by American Music Club
- Released: 2008
- Genres: Indie rock; slowcore
- Label: Self released

American Music Club chronology
The Golden Age (2008)	Atwater Afternoon (2008)

Professional ratings
Review scores
Source	Rating
AllMusic	3/5 stars

Atwater Afternoon was a limited edition CD released by the band American Music Club and initially sold on the tour to promote their album The Golden Age. Half of it was a recording of the band rehearsing songs for the tour and the other half was studio recordings of new songs. The initial run of 300 copies came with either blank covers or covers featuring pictures drawn by the band members. Once these had sold out, it was repressed in an edition of 1500 and sold from the band's web site. Two of the original songs on the album were written by members of the band other than Mark Eitzel. Neither has been released elsewhere. The name of the album relates to the area in Los Angeles where the recording took place.

== Critical reception ==
Jack Rabid of All Music said "American Music Club and singer Mark Eitzel often bring limited-edition CDs to sell on their tours, and their 2008 world tour was no exception. They tend to be high quality and sometimes indispensable (see Eitzel's Lovers Leap USA from 1997), and Atwater, recorded at their rehearsals for globe-trotting, is no exception." The All Music rating was three of five stars.

== Track listing ==
1. "City Lights" (Ray Price cover)
2. "All My Love"
3. "For The Good Times" (Ray Price/Kris Kristofferson cover)
4. "I'm Your Puppet" (made popular by James & Bobby Purify)
5. "Long Long Walk"
6. "Little Joy" (Written and sung by Vudi )
7. "One Step Ahead"
8. "Who You Are"
9. "All The Lost Souls Welcome You To San Francisco"
10. "Insider's Guide To Life" (S. Didelot penned; Mark sings)
11. "Hello Amsterdam"
12. "Home"
13. "Western Sky"

== Personnel ==
- Mark Eitzel
- Vudi
- Steve Didelot
- Sean Hoffman
