= West (Mark Eitzel album) =

Studio album by Mark Eitzel
- Released: May 6, 1997
- Recorded: December 10–16, 1996
- Studio: Ironwood, Seattle, United States
- Genre: Rock, singer–songwriter
- Length: 53:33
- Label: Warner Bros.
- Producer: Peter Buck

Mark Eitzel chronology
Words and Music (1997)	West (1997)	Caught in a Trap and I Can't Back Out 'Cause I Love You Too Much, Baby (1998)

Professional ratings
Review scores
Source	Rating
AllMusic	4.5/5 stars
NME	7/10
Pitchfork Media	9.6/10
Rolling Stone	3.5/5 stars
Uncut	3/5 stars

West is the fourth solo album by the American Music Club singer/songwriter Mark Eitzel, released by Warner Bros. Records in 1997. It includes songs co-written and produced by the R.E.M. guitarist Peter Buck from October 15 to October 17, 1996.

== Critical reception ==
The Chicago Tribune wrote that "with Buck producing and co-writing West, Eitzel has never been part of such an overtly inviting pop album."

== Track listing ==
All songs written by Buck and Eitzel, except where noted:

1. "If You Have to Ask" – 4:20
2. "Free of Harm" – 3:21
3. "Helium" – 5:25
4. "Stunned & Frozen" – 5:10
5. "Then It Really Happens" – 4:28
6. "In Your Life" – 4:04
7. "Lower Eastside Tourist" – 3:49
8. "Three Inches of Wall" – 4:48
9. "Move Myself Ahead" – 3:35
10. "Old Photographs" – 5:22
11. "Fresh Screwdriver" – 3:59
12. "Live or Die" (Eitzel) – 5:14

== Personnel ==
- Mark Eitzel – vocals, guitar on "Live or Die", string arrangements on "If You Have to Ask"
- Steve Berlin – fuzz bass on "Old Photographs", piano on "Helium"
- Peter Buck – guitar, bass guitar on "Live or Die"
- Bruce Kaphan – string arrangements on "If You Have to Ask"
- Barrett Martin – drums, acoustic bass guitar, bass marimba, vibes, tablas, conga, tambourine
- Scott McCaughey – electric bass, organ, piano, slide guitar
- Mike McCready – guitar on "Fresh Screwdriver"
- Skerik – vibraphone, organ, baritone saxophone

== See also ==
- The Lonesome Death of Buck McCoy, a studio album by The Minus 5 featuring many of the same musicians and recorded at the same time as West
