= Laughing stock (disambiguation) =

Laughing stock or Laughingstock may refer to:

- Laughing Stock, an album by Talk Talk
- "Laughing Stock" (song), a song by Grandaddy
- "Laughingstock", a song by American Music Club from California
- "Laughing Stock", a song by Love, a non-album B-side from Forever Changes
- "Laughingstock", a song by Sick of It All
- "Laughingstock", a song by The Walkabouts
- "Laughingstock", a song by [:SITD:]
