= Caught in a Trap and I Can't Back Out 'Cause I Love You Too Much, Baby =

Studio album by Mark Eitzel
- Released: January 20, 1998
- Genre: Rock
- Label: Matador Records

Mark Eitzel chronology
West (1997)	Caught in a Trap and I Can't Back Out 'Cause I Love You Too Much, Baby (1998)	The Invisible Man (2001)

Caught in a Trap and I Can't Back Out 'Cause I Love You Too Much, Baby is the fifth solo album by the American Music Club singer/songwriter Mark Eitzel, released in 1998. A starker follow-up to his previous album, it was the first album he released for the independent label Matador Records. The album has contributions from the Sonic Youth member Steve Shelley, the guitarist Kid Congo Powers and the Yo La Tengo bass guitarist James McNew.

The title is taken from the opening line of Elvis Presley's late-period hit "Suspicious Minds".

Professional ratings
Review scores
Source	Rating
AllMusic	4.5/5 stars
Chicago Tribune	3/4 stars
Entertainment Weekly	B+
NME	6/10
Rolling Stone	3.5/5 stars

== Track listing ==
1. "Are You the Trash"
2. "Xmas Lights Spin"
3. "Auctioneer's Song"
4. "White Rosary"
5. "If I Had a Gun"
6. "Goodbye"
7. "Queen of No One"
8. "Cold Light of Day"
9. "Go Away"
10. "Atico 18"
11. "Sun Smog Seahorse"

== Personnel ==
- Kid Congo Powers - guitar on tracks 5, 6, 8
- James McNew - bass guitar on tracks 6–9
- Steve Shelley - drums on tracks 6–9
