= Everclear (disambiguation) =

Everclear is a brand of grain alcohol.

Everclear may also refer to:

- Everclear (band), an American rock band
- Everclear (album), by American Music Club, 1991
- Ulmus parvifolia 'BSNUPF', an elm cultivar sold under the marketing name Everclear
