= Music for Courage and Confidence =

Studio album by Mark Eitzel
- Released: 2002
- Genre: Rock
- Label: New West
- Producer: Brian Paulson, Johan Kugelberg, Mark Eitzel

Mark Eitzel chronology
The Invisible Man (2001)	Music for Courage and Confidence (2002)	The Ugly American (2002)

Professional ratings
Review scores
Source	Rating
AllMusic	2.5/5 stars
Pitchfork	7.5/10

Music for Courage and Confidence is a solo album by the American Music Club singer/songwriter Mark Eitzel. One of two cover song albums from him in 2002 (along with The Ugly American), it was released by New West Records and is a collection of songs by different songwriters.

== Critical reception ==
No Depression gave the album a mixed review, praising the musical backing and production, but writing that Eitzel doesn't have a strong enough voice to put some of the songs over.

== Track listing ==
1. "Snowbird" (Gene MacLellan)
2. "Ain't No Sunshine" (Bill Withers)
3. "Do You Really Want to Hurt Me" (George O'Dowd, Jon Moss, Michael Craig, Roy Hay)
4. "Help Me Make It Through the Night" (Kris Kristofferson)
5. "I Only Have Eyes for You" (Al Dubin, Harry Warren)
6. "Gentle on My Mind" (John Hartford)
7. "More More More" (Gregory Diamond)
8. "Move on Up" (Curtis Mayfield)
9. "Rehearsals for Retirement" (Phil Ochs)
10. "I'll Be Seeing You" (Irving Kahal, Sammy Fain)
