= The Morlocks (American band) =

American garage rock band

- Origin: San Diego, California, United States
- Genres: Garage rock, garage punk, rock and roll
- Years active: 1984–1987, 2011–present
- Labels: Midnight Records; Epitaph Records; Voxx Records; Earache Records; Dirty Water Records
- Members: Leighton Koizumi; Ted Friedman; Tom Clarke; Jeff Lucas; Mark Mullen; Oliver Pilsner
- Website: Bomp! Records Page

The Morlocks are an American garage rock band from San Diego, California, which formed in 1984. In its first incarnation, the band consisted of guitarist Tommy Clarke, bassist Jeff Lucas, drummer Mark Mullen, as well as vocalist Leighton Koizumi and guitarist Ted Friedman, former members of the Gravedigger Five. After splitting up in 1987, the group reformed under Koizumi with a different lineup.

== History ==
The Morlocks began performing together in late August 1984 when the already assembled core band of Jeff Lucas, Tom Clarke, and Mark Mullen, were able to entice former Gravedigger Five members Leighton Koizumi and Ted Friedman into joining the band. The newly formed Morlocks' first performance came in September 1984 at the Rave-Up in Los Angeles; that same night, following their performance, the band received two separate recording offers, opting, after a time, to sign a deal with Midnight Records of New York City.

That December the band recorded their first mini-LP, Emerge, for Midnight Records. The Morlocks recorded the album with a set of smashed instruments destroyed at a show in San Francisco two days earlier by the band The Tell-Tale Hearts, who agreed to lend the band the instruments for the recording session. The album was produced by Jordan Tarlow, the alias of Nadroj Wolrat, who would go on to join The Fuzztones. The label released the album in the spring of 1985.

Following the release of their first LP the band relocated from San Diego to San Francisco where they released a second LP, this time for Epitaph Records. The band's second LP was a live album called Submerged Alive, which featured a performance the band had recorded in Berkeley, California, in 1986. While the album was apparently recorded live, the LP contained clear studio-manipulations of audience noise, prompting some to label it a "fake" live album.

In the summer of 1987, the band began to fall apart. Just prior to a show at the Fillmore in support of The Cult, bassist Jeff Lucas quit the band. The rest of the band held out long enough to record a handful of tracks under the production of Ron Rimsite before the entire group disbanded. The tracks recorded with Rimsite were eventually released posthumously on two 7" albums. Four years after the band's breakup, a live LP from Croatia called Wake Me When I'm Dead was released. This was followed in 1997 by an officially released live CD provided by guitarist Ted Friedman called Uglier Than You'll Ever Be!, the band's final release.

== Reformation ==
In 1999, Spin Magazine printed an article that claimed that lead singer Leighton Koizumi had died, however this turned out to be untrue. The reason for Koizumi's vanishing act from music-making, involved the "robbing of a dealer" in a Mexican border town in 1990. Although he was just after drugs, Koizumi got ten years in prison on a kidnapping charge, because, as he tells it, the incident involved "tying people up." When he was finally released, he started a new band which he called the Morlocks, with none of the original members. The newly formed Morlocks include Koizumi on vocals, Bobby Bones on guitar and backup vocals, Lenny Pops on guitar, Nic "The Canadian" on bass, and Marky on drums. In addition to reuniting, the band was also touring newly written songs, with Koizumi commenting in 2006 on a possible live album to be released at some time in the future.

== Discography ==
=== Singles ===
- "She's My Fix" / "You Must Not Be Seen As I Am" 7" (Earache, 1989, EAR010)
- "Under The Wheel" / "Hurricane A' Coming" 7" (Iloki, 1991, ITR001)
- "I Don't Do Funerals Anymore" / "Nightmares" 7" (Dirty Water, 2008, DWC1018)

=== Albums ===
- Emerge (Midnight, 1985, MIR LP 111)
- Submerged Alive (Epitaph, 1988, EPI/MLP1)
- Wake Me When I'm Dead (Listen Loudest, 1991, SNLP 7, Croatia)
- Uglier Than You'll Ever Be! (Voxx, 1997, VCD2071)
- Easy Listening For The Underachiever (Go Down Records, 2008, GODLP027)
- The Morlocks Play Chess
- Bring On The Mesmeric Condition(Hound Gawd/Differ-Ant, 2018)
