= John Murry (musician) =

American singer-songwriter

- Born: John Miller Murry; 1979 (age 46–47); Mississippi, United States
- Origin: Tupelo, Mississippi, United States
- Genres: Folk, Americana, indie, experimental
- Occupations: Musician, singer-songwriter, producer
- Instruments: Electric and acoustic guitars, piano
- Years active: 1998–present
- Labels: Evangeline, Spunk, Warner, Rubyworks, TV Records, Latent Recordings, Submarine Cat
- Website: www.johnmurry.com

John Miller Murry (born 1979) is an American musician, singer-songwriter, composer and producer. He is from Tupelo, Mississippi, and currently lives in Aberdeen, Mississippi.

His debut solo record, The Graceless Age, was issued on Evangeline Recording Co. in 2013 and listed by Uncut as one of the 10 best records of 2012. Mojo also included it in their 10 best albums of 2013; The Guardian included it in their Top 50 of 2013; and American Songwriter included it in their Top 5 of 2013.

Murry has recorded and toured with Memphis singer-songwriter Bob Frank. Murry often writes and collaborates with the San Francisco-based singer-songwriter, Chuck Prophet.

The follow-up to The Graceless Age, was recorded in Canada by Michael Timmins and was released by TV Records in Europe under exclusive license from Latent Recordings on July 14, 2017, and in February 2018 in North America by Latent Recordings.

2021 saw the release of The Stars are Gods Bullet Holes which charted at 22 in the U.K. indie album charts and No 6 in the U.K. Americana charts.

== Biography ==
John Murry is the second cousin of William Faulkner through adoption, though a more direct relation hidden from Murry has been put forth by Robin Young of NPR and others.

He began singing at the age of five in church. At 12, he learned the Tom Petty song "Free Fallin". He began playing in bands when he moved to Memphis, Tennessee, as a teenager.

Murry was a member of several bands in the early 2000s. His first appearance as a solo artist was on an album in collaboration with Bob Frank, World Without End, which was released on Bowstring Records in 2006. David Fricke of Rolling Stone described it as "all bullets, blades and guilt without end."

Murry moved to the Bay Area of California in 2004 and began performing solo work. He began recording with producer (and American Music Club drummer) Tim Mooney in 2005 and worked at San Francisco's Closer Recording Studio, where he met Chuck Prophet. After several collaborative recordings with Bob Frank, Murry released his debut solo album, The Graceless Age in 2012, which was well received by Mojo, Uncut and The Wall Street Journal.

== The Graceless Age and critical reception ==
Murry's debut solo record, The Graceless Age, details his struggle with substance abuse. It was released in 2012 in the UK on Bucketfull of Brains, and in 2013 in the US and Australia on Evangeline Recording Co. and Spunk Records, respectively. It received critical acclaim from a number of magazines. It was featured in the September 2012 issue of Uncut; senior editor Allan Jones called it "a masterpiece" and gave it a 9/10 rating. Mojo gave the record a 5/5 star review, and The Guardian called it " a work of genius", also giving it 5/5 stars. NPR said the record's "deep rock 'n' roll is alluring, emotional and infectious," while American Songwriter said it was filled with songs about "drugs and near-death experiences" that had "standouts everywhere." Q magazine called it "Intensely beautiful... Like Father John Misty, Mark Lanegan and Josh T Pearson rolled into one really broken dream." The record featured a song called "Little Colored Balloons," chronicling Murry's near-overdose from heroin, the video for which was directed by Chuck Mobley and premiered on Billboard.

== A Short History Of Decay ==
Shortly after the release of The Graceless Age, Murry's mentor Tim Mooney died suddenly and Murry eventually relocated to Ireland. A Short History Of Decay was released in July 2017 on Michael Timmins label, Latent Recordings, in Canada and on TV Records Ltd in Europe. Produced by Michael Timmins and recorded over a period of five days in Toronto, A Short History Of Decay featured Michael's brother and fellow Cowboy Junkie Pete Timmins on drums, Josh Finlayson on bass with backing vocals by Cait O'Riordan. A Short History Of Decay has again received widespread critical acclaim. With glowing in reviews in Mojo (4/5), Q magazine (4/5), Uncut (8/10), The Sunday Times who named Murry "Seer Of The Week', Hotpress (9/10) and The Quietus observing "There is more than a touch of Cave's brooding darkness about Murry, whose rumbling voice and preoccupation with mortality place him in a genre somewhere between Mark Lanegan and Mark Linkous".

== Documentary: The Graceless Age: The Ballad of John Murry ==
A documentary about Murry's life (titled The Graceless Age: The Ballad of John Murry) is being released in 2023 by filmmaker Sarah Share and producer Nuala Cunningham. Additional producers: New Decade/Hawkeye/Irish Film Board .

The release coincides with a 10th anniversary reissue of the album The Graceless Age.

== Albums ==
- World Without End (Decor - UK, Evangeline - US 2006) - with Bob Frank
- The Gunplay EP (Decor - UK, Evangeline - US 2006) - with Bob Frank
- Brinkley, Arkansas, and Other Assorted Love Songs (Evangeline, 2009) - with Bob Frank and the Lansky Brothers
- The Graceless Age (Bucketfull of Brains - UK 2012, Spunk Records - AUS/NZ 2012, Rubyworks (expanded edition and regular edition) - Europe 2013, Evangeline Recording Co.- US 2013)
- Califorlornia EP (10" Vinyl - Rubyworks ) (CD - Warner - AUS/NZ)
- A Short History of Decay Produced by Michael Timmins (Latent Recordings, 2017)
- the stars are god’s bullet holes. Produced by John Parish. (Submarine Cat, 2021)
- The Graceless Age -

Remastered Record Store Day 2022 10th Anniversary Reissue (Limited to 1000 copies - 10th Anniversary Edition Double Gold Vinyl Half Speed Master - Remastered by John Webber at AIR Studios Lyndhurst Hall, London, UK) - (Rubyworks), 2022.

- Privately Printed and Sold Limited Edition EP's:
- The Resurrection of John Quijote El Bueno
- John Murry is Dead
- Perfume + Decay
- Murry’s Almanack
