= Engine (American Music Club album) =

Studio album by American Music Club
- Released: 1987
- Genres: Indie rock, slowcore
- Labels: Frontier/Grifter (reissues Zippo (1990), Warner Bros. Records (1998))
- Producer: Tom Mallon

American Music Club chronology
The Restless Stranger (1985)	Engine (1987)	California (1988)

Professional ratings
Review scores
Source	Rating
Allmusic	3/5 stars
Underground	(1^{5/6}/3)

Engine is the second album by American Music Club. It was jointly released by Frontier and Grifter in the US and by Zippo in the UK and Europe in 1987. The 1998 Warner Bros. Records reissue added three additional tracks from the same period. The artwork for the Zippo UK release features an incorrect track listing, putting the songs in the wrong order.

== Track listing ==
All songs written by Mark Eitzel except as noted.

1. "Big Night"
2. "Outside This Bar"
3. "At My Mercy"
4. "Gary's Song"
5. "Nightwatchman"
6. "Clouds"
7. "Electric Light" (Mark Eitzel/Tim Mooney)
8. "Mom's TV"
9. "Art of Love" (Mark Eitzel/Dan Pearson/Vudi/Matt Norelli)
10. "Asleep" (Mark Eitzel/Kathleen Burns)
11. "This Year"
12. "Away Down My Street" (Live at the Hotel Utah)
13. "Art of Love" (Rock 'n Roll Version) (Mark Eitzel/Dan Pearson/Vudi/Matt Norelli)
14. "Shut Down" (Live at the Hotel Utah)

Tracks 12, 13 and 14 only appear on the 1998 Warner Bros. Records reissue. "Art of Love (Goof-Rock Version)" appears as a bonus track at the end of side one on the 1987 Frontier/Grifter cassette edition.

== Personnel ==
- Mark Eitzel - vocals, guitar
- Vudi - lead guitar, backing vocals, accordion, keyboard
- Dan Pearson - bass guitar, backing vocals, mandolin, guitar
- Tom Mallon - guitar, backing vocals, percussion, producer
- Dave Scheff - drums (Clouds, Gary's Song, At My Mercy, Nightwatchman)
- Matt Norelli - drums (Outside This Bar, Mom's TV, Art of Love, Asleep)
- Tim Vaughan - drums (Electric Light)
- Carla Fabrizio - cello
- Brian Schendele - keyboards
- Pamela Gentile - cover photo
