= Toiling Midgets =

American rock band

- Origin: San Francisco, California, United States
- Genres: Post-punk, post-rock, instrumental rock
- Years active: 1979–1983, 1989–1997, 2007–present
- Labels: Matador, Rough Trade, Fistpuppet, Thermidor, Toiling Midgets Media
- Members: Craig Gray; Paul Hood; Daniel Cerny; Daniel Benyamin
- Past members: Nosmo King; Tim Mooney; Ricky Williams; Aaron Gregory; Tom Mallon; Annie Ungar; Mark Eitzel; Joe Goldring; Joanna Hood; David Ripley; Carla Fabrizio; Lisa Davis; Erich Werner; Mark Sullivan; Simon Bell
- Website: www.toilingmidgets.com

Toiling Midgets are a rock band from San Francisco, California formed in 1979 by members of punk bands Sleepers and Negative Trend (the former not related to the English rock band Sleeper). They have been active on-and-off since 1979, with their early 1990s lineup getting most attention due to the involvement of Mark Eitzel of indie rock band American Music Club. They reunited in 2007.

== History ==
Toiling Midgets was formed in 1979 by drummer Tim Mooney, of The Sleepers and Negative Trend, and guitarist Craig Gray also of the local San Francisco band Negative Trend, guitarist Paul Hood from Seattle's punk bands Meyce and The Enemy, and bassist Nosmo King (aka Johnathan Henrickson). Initially an instrumental band, they added former Sleepers and Flipper singer Ricky Williams to its lineup in 1980.

This lineup of the band recorded the first Toiling Midgets album, Sea of Unrest, produced by Tom Mallon and released in 1982 by Rough Trade Records. The album was described by Jordan N. Mamone in CMJ New Music Report as a "junkie-rock monument...beautiful, yet horribly-sick stuff". The album was included in Andrew Earles' 2014 book Gimme Indie Rock: 500 Essential American Underground Rock Albums 1981-1996.

Williams and King left the band, with Aaron Gregory (bass, ex-Maggots) and Annie Ungar (guitar, ex-Gun Club) joining, this formation recording the instrumental Dead Beats album, released on Joe Carducci's Thermidor label in 1985.

After a few years on hiatus, in 1989 Hood, Gray and Mooney reunited, initially again as an instrumental band, with Joe Goldring on bass, but they recruited singer Mark Eitzel (for whom Williams had been an influence) of American Music Club in 1990. The new group released the album SON on Matador Records in June 1991, by which time Eitzel had left the band. After touring in the summer of 1991 to support SON drummer Mooney and bassist Goldring left the band. Mooney went on to join the American Music Club, which Eitzel was still fronting, and Goldring later formed Touched by a Janitor and Enablers. They were replaced by drummer and long-time producer Tom Mallon and bassist Erich Werner, formerly a member of Telepaths and The Blackouts. Williams returned to the band and recorded 6 songs as well as a show in the fall of 1992 but died on November 21, 1992, due to respiratory complications and a mixture of drug and alcohol abuse.

Mallon, Werner, Gray, and Hood continued with keyboard player Mark Sullivan (Lucky, Motorcade) joining, and Paul Hood's sister, violist Joanna Hood (who had performed with the Loma Mar Quartet and Paul McCartney) also joining briefly. The group went on an indefinite hiatus in 1997, but reformed in May, 2007 to play at Dirkfest, a June 7–June 8, 2007 festival taking place at Slim's and the Great American Music Hall, respectively, honoring the late Dirk Dirksen and to play the Haight-Ashbury Street Fair (June 10, 2007). There was a short tour of the Northwest in November, 2009. A new LP was recorded in 2011 but remains unreleased. Tim Mooney died in June 2012.

In 2013 Ektro Records released a live album Toiling Midgets Live at the Waldorf 1982. Tom Mallon died in January 2014 after being diagnosed with a brain tumor. Ektro Records put out the career retrospective double LP A Smaller Life in 2015 and an accompanying cassette A Smaller Tape in 2017.

In 2019 the Midgets toured Europe with Simon Bell on bass and vocals along with Daniel Benyamin of SEA + AIR on drums. In Sept of 2019 the LP Sea of Tranquility was released on Green Monkey Records. Simon quit the band just after the LP release and was replaced by Kevin Kuhn from the band Die Nerven.

The Toiling Midgets released a new EP in Summer 2022 and toured the West coast of the US. In 2023 a full length LP record will be released by the Clouds Hill label, including special guest musicians Chris Eckman (The Walkabouts), Kevin Kuhn (Die Nerven), Zar Monta Cola (Jumbo Jet) and Chris Cacavas (Green On Red, The Dream Syndicate) and Eugene Robinson (Oxbow) and more is scheduled for 2023, along with a European tour.

Their latest line-up consists of 4 people living in 6 countries: a Czech singer and clarinet player from London, a German drummer from Thessaloniki, Greece who joined the two original members, Craig Gray from Vancouver, Canada and Paul Hood from Seattle, USA. In 2023 they changed their name to Lazy Giants.

== Members ==
=== Current ===
- Craig Gray - guitar, vocals
- Paul Hood - guitar, vocals
- Daniel Benyamin - drums, vocals
- Daniel Cerny - vocals, clarinet, electronics, bass

=== Former ===
- Tony Sales - drums
- Mark Sullivan - keyboards
- Erich Werner - bass
- Nosmo King - bass
- Tim Mooney - drums (deceased)
- Ricky Williams - vocals (deceased)
- Aaron Gregory - bass (deceased)
- Tom Mallon - drums (deceased)
- Annie Ungar - guitar (deceased)
- Mark Eitzel - vocals
- Joe Goldring - bass
- Joanna Hood - viola
- David Ripley - vocals
- Carla Fabrizio - cello on "Son"
- Lisa Davis - bass on "Son"
- Simon Bell - bass and vocals
- Kevin Kuhn - bass and vocals

== Discography ==
=== Albums ===
Studio

- Sea of Unrest (1982), Instant/Rough Trade USA – re-released in 1994 on Fistpuppet Records
- Dead Beats, (1985), Thermidor
- Son (1992), Matador
- Sea of Tranquility (2019) Green Monkey Records
- Three Things (2022)

Compilations, demos, live, etc.

- Four Track Mind (A Retrospective Of Home Recordings, 1980-1983 (1983), Mogul Home Recording
- 1982 vol. 1 (2012)
- Live At The Old Waldorf, July 21, 1982 (2012), Full Contact
- God's Man (2013), Toiling Midgets Media – a demo from 1989-90 recorded by Tom Mallon
- 3rd Brain (2013)
- Mark Has Left The Building! - Live at the IBeam SF 91 (2015)
- Do the Incendiary: 1980 Demos (2015)
- Deadbeats EP (2015)
- A Smaller Life (2015)
- A Smaller Tape (2017), Ruton Music

=== Singles ===
- "Golden Frog" 7" (1991), Matador
- "Faux Pony" (1992), Hut
- "Sticky Sun" (2023) Clouds Hill
- "She is the Rain" (2023) Clouds Hill
