= The Golden Age (American Music Club album) =

Studio album by American Music Club
- Released: February 19, 2008
- Recorded: July–August 2007
- Studios: King Size Studio, Los Angeles
- Genres: Indie rock; slowcore
- Length: 55:04
- Label: Merge
- Producer: Dave Trumfio

American Music Club chronology
Love Songs for Patriots (2004)	The Golden Age (2008)	Atwater Afternoon (2008)

The Golden Age is the 9th and final studio album released by American indie rock band American Music Club. The album is the band's second after a 10-year hiatus that ended in 2004. The album is an effort by the band to experiment more in their music. The album was produced by Dave Trumfio, who has also worked for bands such as Wilco and My Morning Jacket.

== Critical reception ==
Professional ratings
Review scores
Source	Rating
Allmusic	4/5 stars
Pitchfork Media	(7.7/10)

The album was released to generally positive critical reviews with a score of 80 (out of 100) on Metacritic.

== Recording ==
The album was recorded over two months at Kingsize Studios in Los Angeles with Dave Trumfio, who also recorded Wilco's Summerteeth album. Frontman Mark Eitzel began writing the songs that appear on the Golden Age in 2005, though recording didn't begin until 2007.

== Track listing ==
1. "All My Love" (5:10)
2. "The John Berchman Victory Choir" (2:53)
3. "The Decibels and the Little Pills" (5:41)
4. "The Sleeping Beauty" (3:58)
5. "The Stars" (5:17)
6. "All the Lost Souls Welcome You to San Francisco" (2:43)
7. "Who You Are" (4:31)
8. "The Windows on the World" (6:11)
9. "One Step Ahead" (3:33)
10. "The Dance" (3:17)
11. "I Know That's Not Really You" (3:52)
12. "On My Way" (5:13)
13. "The Grand Duchess of San Francisco" (2:46)

== Personnel ==
- Mark Eitzel - vocals, guitars, keyboards
- Mark "Vudi" Pankler - guitars, accordion, keyboards
- Sean Hoffman - bass guitar, backing vocals, guitar
- Steve Didelot - drums, percussion, backing vocals, guitar

with:

- Danny Levin - horns
- Jason Borger - keyboards
- Leyla Akdogan - additional vocals on "The John Berchman Victory Choir"
