= The Naked Skinnies =

American new wave band

The Naked Skinnies were a new wave band from Ohio that featured Mark Eitzel, guitar and vocals, Nancy Kangas, organ; John Hricko, bass and Greg Bonnell, drums.

The band was active from 1981 to 1982 in Columbus, Ohio and San Francisco, California. They released one single in 1981. Greg Bonnell continued to perform in an early version of American Music Club with Mark Eitzel. John Hricko went on to drum for San Francisco band, The Invertebrates.

== Discography ==
- All My Life / This Is The Beautiful Night (7") - Naked House Records - 1981
