= The Restless Stranger =

Studio album by American Music Club
- Released: January 1985
- Genres: Indie rock, slowcore
- Label: Grifter
- Producer: Tom Mallon

American Music Club chronology
The Restless Stranger (1985)	Engine (1987)

Professional ratings
Review scores
Source	Rating
AllMusic	2/5 stars

The Restless Stranger is the first album by American Music Club, released in 1985. It is considered to be one of the first slowcore album to be released.

== Track listing ==
All songs written by Mark Eitzel. Tracks 13–15 are bonus tracks on the CD reissue.

1. "Room Above the Club" - 3:50
2. "$1,000,000 Song" - 3:56
3. "Away Down the Street" - 4:21
4. "Yvonne Gets Dumped" - 3:16
5. "Mr. Lucky" - 2:42
6. "Point of Desire" - 4:32
7. "Goodbye Reprise #54" - 3:54
8. "Tell Yourself" - 4:03
9. "When Your Love Is Gone" - 4:19
10. "Heavenly Smile" - 1:58
11. "Broken Glass" - 4:23
12. "Hold on to Your Love" - 2:21
13. "Restless Stranger" - 4:04
14. "How Low? " - 4:23
15. "I'm in Heaven Now" - 3:51

== Personnel ==
- Mark Eitzel - vocals
- Dan Pearson - bass
- Vudi - guitar
- Matt Norelli - drums
- Brad Johnson - keyboards
- Bobby Neel Adams - photography
