= Bruce Kaphan =

Bruce Kaphan is a musician and recording engineer who has worked on many studio projects, often as a pedal steel player, from 1970 to 2011. In particular he was a member of American Music Club. He is also credited with engineering, mixing, and/or mastering over sixty albums, including several albums by The Crooked Jades and the solo cover album Loveless: Hurts to Love by Kenny Feinstein of the band Water Tower.

== Albums ==
Albums he has worked on include the following:

- Schoolyard Ghosts
- Everclear
- I Am the Resurrection
- California
- Silence
- Pass It Around
- Violence in the Snowy Fields
- Mercury
- Wildflower
- United Kingdom
- San Francisco
- West
- No Alternative
- Three Snakes and One Charm
