= The Invisible Man (album) =

Studio album by Mark Eitzel
- Released: 2001
- Genre: Rock
- Label: Matador Records
- Producer: Mark Eitzel, Jason Carmer

Mark Eitzel chronology
Caught in a Trap and I Can't Back Out 'Cause I Love You Too Much, Baby (1998)	The Invisible Man (2001)	Music for Courage and Confidence (2003)

Professional ratings
Aggregate scores
Source	Rating
Metacritic	(75/100)
Review scores
Source	Rating
AllMusic	4.5/5 stars
Pitchfork Media	9.1/10
Tiny Mix Tapes	4.5/5 stars

The Invisible Man is a solo album by the American Music Club singer/songwriter Mark Eitzel, released by Matador Records in 2001.

It is a more electronic effort by Eitzel, who is known for his stark, acoustic arrangements. Eitzel wrote all of the songs on an acoustic guitar, but finished most of them with a sampler and Pro Tools on his Power Mac G4 in the front room of his house.

== Critical reception ==
No Depression called the album "a real return to form, evoking the ghost of [Eitzel's] former band of arch-miserablists, the American Music Club." The Detroit Metro Times called it a "subdued yet powerful record, confirming Eitzel as a talented musician and one of the best songwriters of his generation."

== Track listing ==
1. "The Boy With the Hammer"
2. "Can You See?"
3. "Christian Science Reading Room"
4. "Sleep"
5. "To the Sea"
6. "Shine"
7. "Steve I Always Knew"
8. "Bitterness"
9. "Anything"
10. Without You
11. "The Global Sweep of Human History"
12. "Seeing Eye Dog"
13. "Proclaim Your Joy"
