= Everclear (album) =

Studio album by American Music Club
- Released: October 5, 1991
- Recorded: 1991
- Studios: Music Annex Studio A (Menlo Park, California); Soma Sync Studios (San Francisco, California); Brilliant Studios (San Francisco, California)
- Genres: Indie rock; sadcore; gothic rock
- Length: 36:36
- Label: Alias
- Producers: American Music Club; Bruce Kaphan; Norman Kerner

American Music Club chronology
United Kingdom (1989)	Everclear (1991)	Mercury (1993)

Singles from Everclear
- 1. "Rise" Released: September 1991; 2. "Why Won't You Stay" Released: 1991 (Europe only)

Everclear is the fifth studio album by American indie rock band American Music Club. It was released on October 5, 1991, on Alias Records.

"Rise" was released as a single in 1991 via the Rise CD maxi-EP on Alias Records, which contained the non-album tracks "Chanel #5", "The Right Thing" and an alternate version of "Crabwalk". The music video for "Rise" received minor play on MTV's 120 Minutes late-night program.

== Critical reception ==
Professional ratings
Review scores
Source	Rating
AllMusic	4.5/5 stars
Chicago Tribune	3/4 stars
Christgau's Consumer Guide	(3-star Honorable Mention)
Encyclopedia of Popular Music	4/5 stars
Q	4/5 stars
Spin Alternative Record Guide	7/10

On the strength of Everclear, Mark Eitzel was named Rolling Stone magazine's Songwriter of the Year in 1991. Rolling Stone also placed Everclear in their list of top five albums of the year.

In an article in the December 1994 – January 1995 issue of Addicted to Noise, the band recounted:

"I remember we were somewhere in Germany and we found out about the Rolling Stone poll," says Eitzel. "It made me feel really good. But for the next show there were about 20 people in the audience. And they were army guys and they thought American Music Club were some righteous American freedom-fighting, cool ass Springsteen-influenced Guns N' Roses kind of guys. And we did not rock." "They didn't know we'd made 'one of the best records of the year' and he was the 'best songwriter,'" adds bassist Dan Pearson. "They couldn't give a fuck about that shit," says Eitzel. "And they certainly didn't agree."

Eric Weisbard of Spin Alternative Record Guide (1995) wrote that Everclear marked American Music Club's failed attempt to "take over the world", adding that the album "was weirdly produced by Kaphan—imagine a pedal steelist's megalomanic fantasy—with the would-be modern rock hit 'Rise' especially cheesy." However, he praised several songs, including the mournful, AIDS-inspired "Sick of Food" and "The Dead Part of You". Pitchfork's Chris Ott included Everclear in a list of albums common in second-hand stores. He wrote: "Hideously produced for Alias-- the same label that fucked up Yo La Tengo's May I Sing with Me-- Everclear is an overstuffed, underdeveloped album drenched in a plate of reverb on par with Queensryche."

== Track listing ==
All tracks are written by Mark Eitzel.

No.	Title	Length
1.	"Why Won't You Stay"	2:59
2.	"Rise"	3:11
3.	"Miracle on 8th Street"	4:07
4.	"Ex-Girlfriend"	2:49
5.	"Crabwalk"	3:33
6.	"The Confidential Agent"	4:10
7.	"Sick of Food"	4:02
8.	"The Dead Part of You"	2:42
9.	"Royal Café"	3:23
10.	"What the Pillar of Salt Held Up"	2:38
11.	"Jesus' Hands"	3:02

== Personnel ==
American Music Club

- Mark Eitzel – vocals, guitar, keyboards, songwriting
- Bruce Kaphan – pedal steel, keyboards, bass, percussion, lap steel, dobro, guitar, dulcimer
- Dan Pearson – bass, guitar, dulcimer, mandolin, banjo, vocals
- Mike Simms – drums
- Vudi – guitar, accordion, bass

Production

- American Music Club – production
- Tom Carr – recording
- Joe Chiccarelli – mixing
- Kyle Johnson – second engineer at Soma Sync Studios
- Bruce Kaphan – production, mixing, recording
- Norman Kerner – production, recording
- Bob Ludwig – mastering

Artwork and design

- Beth Herzhaft – photography
- Jean Lowe – cover painting
- Frank Weidemann – design

Production notes

- All songs produced by Bruce Kaphan and American Music Club except "Rise" and "The Dead Part of You", produced by Norman Kerner and American Music Club.
- All songs mixed by Joe Chiccarelli except "The Confidential Agent" and "What the Pillar of Salt Held Up", mixed by Bruce Kaphan.
- All songs recorded by Bruce Kaphan and Tom Carr at Music Annex Studio A (Menlo Park, California) and at Soma Sync Studios (San Francisco), except "Rise" and "The Dead Part of You", recorded by Norman Kerner at Brilliant Studios (San Francisco) and Bruce Kaphan and Tom Carr at Soma Sync Studios.
- All songs mastered by Bob Ludwig at Masterdisk in New York.
