= Bob Frank =

American singer-songwriter (1944–2019)

- Born: Robert Landis Frank; February 26, 1944; Memphis, Tennessee, U.S.
- Died: July 18, 2019 (aged 75)
- Genre: folk
- Occupations: musician, songwriter, composer, arranger
- Instrument: Singer-songwriter
- Years active: 1969–1973, 2001–2019
- Labels: Vanguard Records, Bowstring Records, Evangeline, Memphis International, Decor

Robert Landis Frank (February 26, 1944 – July 18, 2019) was an American musician, singer-songwriter and composer. His debut self-titled record was issued on Vanguard Records in 1972 to critical acclaim and is a collector's item that was reissued on Light in the Attic in 2014. He co-wrote, recorded and toured with Mississippi/Memphis singer-songwriter John Murry, shared a stage with Gus Cannon, Jimmy Driftwood, Lightning Hopkins, Tim Buckley and Townes Van Zandt, and was a paid songwriter for Tree Publishing. He lived in El Sobrante, California.

Frank's 20th century version of the late Middle English classic, "A Lytell Geste of Robyn Hode" (Child Ballad #117), released on Bowstring Records in 2001, received rave reviews from English professors, music critics, historians, actors, college professors, school teachers and Oxford dons.

== Critical reception ==
Though not widely known, Frank's songs have earned wide critical acclaim. Jim Dickinson, a producer for Big Star and a Memphis music legend, called Frank "the greatest songwriter you never heard." In Rolling Stone, Senior Editor David Fricke called Frank's debut "beautifully stark" and compared him to Warren Zevon. Frank's collaboration with singer-songwriter John Murry on 2006 LP World Without End was praised in the Village Voice, Uncut, Rolling Stone, The Irish Times and The Independent UK. His songs have been recorded by Jim Dickinson, Chris LeDoux, Gary McMahan, and others.

== Discography ==
=== Albums ===
- Bob Frank (Vanguard Records, 1972)
- A Little Gest of Robin Hood (Bowstring Records, 2001)
- Keep On Burning (Bowstring Records, 2002)
- Pledge of Allegiance (Bowstring Records, 2004)
- Ride the Restless Wind (Bowstring Records, 2005)
- World Without End (Bowstring Records, 2006; Evangeline – US, Decor – UK, 2007)
- The Gunplay EP (Evangeline – US, Decor – UK, 2007)
- Red Neck, Blue Collar (Memphis International, 2008)
- Brinkley, Arkansas, and Other Assorted Love Songs (Evangeline, 2009)
- The Scenic Route (Bowstring Records, 2010)
- Twilight in Tolleson (Nomad Records of Tolleson, AZ, 2016)
- By the Light of the Lamp (Nomad Records of Tolleson, AZ, 2017)
- Squeeze It Easy (Nomad Records of Tolleson, AZ, 2017)
- Dancing in Dallas (Nomad Records of Tolleson, AZ, 2018)
