= California (American Music Club album) =

Studio album by American Music Club
- Released: November 10, 1988
- Genres: Indie rock; Americana
- Length: 41:32
- Label: Frontier
- Producer: Tom Mallon

American Music Club chronology
Engine (1987)	California (1988)	United Kingdom (1989)

Professional ratings
Review scores
Source	Rating
AllMusic	4/5 stars
NME	8/10
Spin Alternative Record Guide	9/10

California is the third studio album by American indie rock band American Music Club. It was released on November 10, 1988 on Frontier Records.

The album was included in the book 1001 Albums You Must Hear Before You Die. In the album's article in the book, reviewer Arnar Eggert Thoroddsen, from Iceland's daily newspaper Morgunblaðið, describes the album as the band's "definitive statement."

== Track listing ==
All tracks are written by Mark Eitzel.

No.	Title	Length
1.	"Firefly"	2:49
2.	"Somewhere"	3:01
3.	"Laughingstock"	4:17
4.	"Lonely"	2:42
5.	"Pale Skinny Girl"	3:33
6.	"Blue and Grey Shirt"	3:33
7.	"Bad Liquor"	1:57
8.	"Now You're Defeated"	2:28
9.	"Jenny"	2:38
10.	"Western Sky"	3:28
11.	"Highway 5"	3:49
12.	"Last Harbor"	4:35

== Personnel ==
American Music Club

- Mark Eitzel – vocals, guitars
- Tom Mallon – drums, production, engineering
- Dan Pearson – bass
- Vudi – guitar, accordion

Additional musicians

- Bruce Kaphan – pedal steel
- Lisa Davis – bass on "Firefly"

Artwork and design

- Bobby Neel Adams – photography
