= Don't Be a Stranger (Mark Eitzel album) =

Studio album by Mark Eitzel
- Released: October 2, 2012
- Genres: Rock; pop
- Length: 43:36
- Label: Merge
- Producer: Sheldon Gomberg

Mark Eitzel chronology
Brannan Street (2010)	Don't Be a Stranger (2012)

Professional ratings
Aggregate scores
Source	Rating
Metacritic	76/100
Review scores
Source	Rating
AllMusic	4/5 stars
Blurt	8/10
Consequence of Sound	3.5/5 stars
MusicOMH	4/5 stars
Paste	8/10
Pitchfork	7.8/10

Don't Be a Stranger is the eleventh solo studio album by the singer-songwriter Mark Eitzel. It was released in October 2012 on Merge Records and produced by Sheldon Gomberg.

== Track listing ==
Don't Be a Stranger track listing
No.	Title	Length
1.	"I Love You But You're Dead"	4:35
2.	"The Bill Is Due"	3:12
3.	"All My Love"	5:07
4.	"Oh Mercy"	4:03
5.	"Costume Characters Face Dangers in the Workplace"	2:30
6.	"Why Are You with Me"	3:19
7.	"Lament for Bobo the Clown"	4:56
8.	"Break the Champagne"	3:36
9.	"We All Have to Find Our Own Way Out"	4:19
10.	"You're Waiting"	4:48
11.	"Nowhere to Run"	3:11
Total length:		43:36
