= Ricky Williams (musician) =

American drummer

- Born: Richard Williams; October 4, 1956; Palo Alto, California, U.S.
- Died: November 21, 1992 (aged 36) El Camino, California, U.S.
- Genres: Rock and roll, punk rock, post-punk
- Occupations: Singer, songwriter
- Instruments: Drums, vocals, multi-instrumentalist
- Formerly of: Crime, The Sleepers, Flipper, Toiling Midgets

Ricky Williams (October 4, 1956 – November 21, 1992), also known as Ricky Tractor, was an American musician based in San Francisco. He is best known as a vocalist and lyricist, but also played drums and guitar. He was the second drummer for Crime (1976–1977), the original singer for Flipper (1979) and the Sleepers (1977–1981), and vocalist for Toiling Midgets (1981–1983). He has been credited with giving Flipper their band name, although he was fired before they made any recordings. Williams died at the age of 36 on November 21, 1992, of a heroin overdose.

== Early life ==
Williams was born in Palo Alto, California, on October 4, 1956. His father was Robert Williams, and he had one sister, named Kathie Lee. He was also known to indulge in substance abuse throughout his life, including speed, LSD and alcohol.

== Career ==
In 1976, Williams was the drummer and an early member of Crime (where he was called "Ricky Tractor"), until he was kicked out in 1977 for his "inconsistencies" both on his instrument and in his personality. In 1979, he was a founding member of Flipper. He sang vocals, and was the one who named the band, but was fired "for being too weird" before the band had released any recordings. He was invited that year by Michael Belfer to become the vocalist for The Sleepers, which released one EP, one single and one album before breaking up in 1981. After the breakup of The Sleepers, he joined Toiling Midgets as vocalist from 1981 until 1983.

== Personal life ==
Towards the end of his life, Williams lived with his mother in Mountain View, California. His mother was killed in a car accident, and a year and two months later, Williams himself was dead. At the time of his death, he was remastering his recorded work for re-release. He had been suffering from respiratory disease and died in his sleep on November 21, 1992. He was survived by his father, sister, and a son named Zachary; Zachary later performed with his father's former bandmates in Negative Trend, performing some of his father's songs.
