= Green Monkey Records =

American record label

Green Monkey Records is an underground record label started in Seattle, Washington, US. It was established by local musician Tom Dyer and was active from 1983 to 1991 and from 2009 to present, with sporadic releases in the interim. It is currently headquartered in Olympia, Washington, US.

== History ==
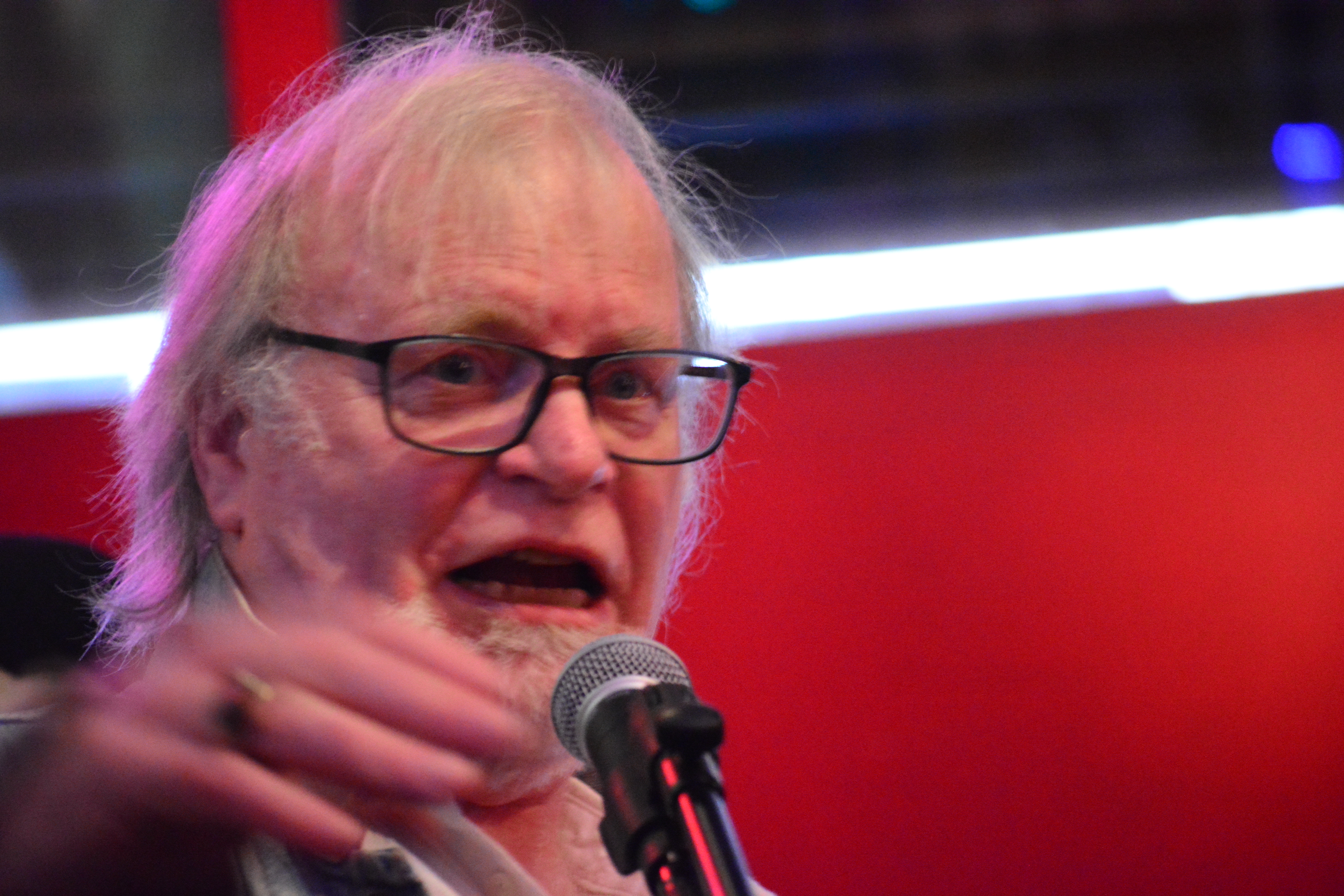
Tom Dyer, 2025

Green Monkey Records was established in 1983 by Tom Dyer. He was previously a member of the band Colorplates and recorded a solo project after the band folded in 1981. He built a four-track studio which he expanded to an eight-track studio, eventually releasing a 15 song tape of local artists who had recorded at his studio. It released several more albums, including the 1985 cassette Fight Back by the Bombardiers. The label was active through 1991, with Dyer re-launching the label again in 2009.

In 2009, Green Monkey Records released a 2 CD compilation album, titled It Crawled from the Basement.

== Sound and cultural impact ==
The label has received positive press from local "listener-powered" indie radio station KEXP.
