= Mark Eitzel =

American musician (born 1959)

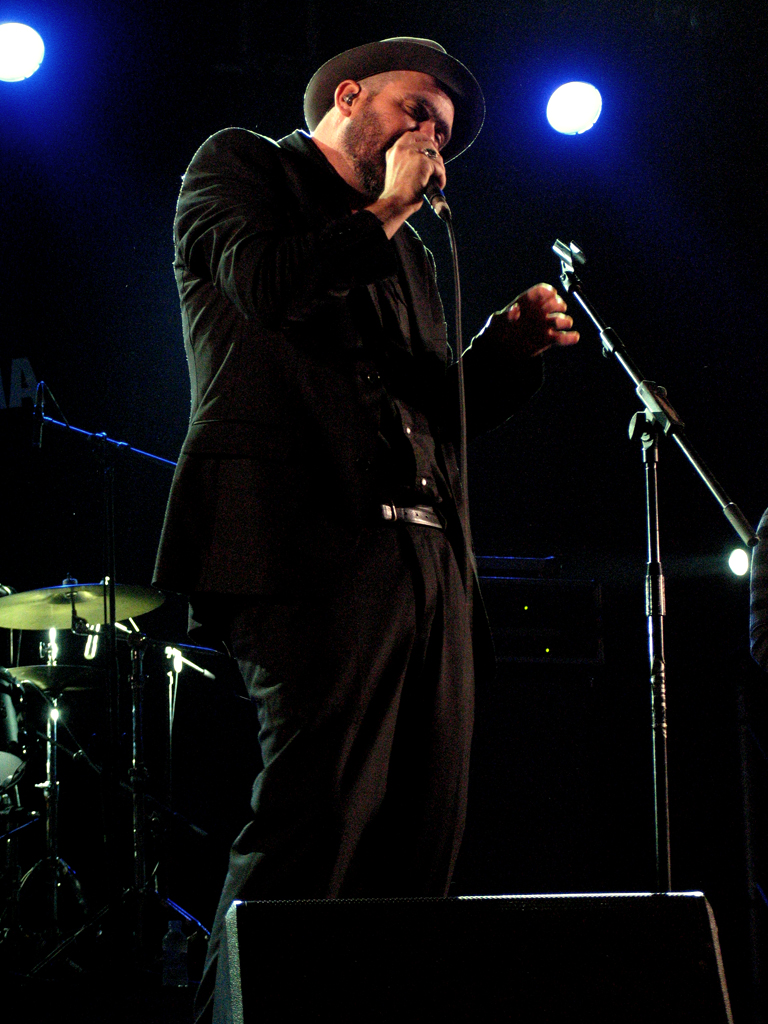
- Eitzel with American Music Club in 2008

Background information
- Born: John Mark Eitzel; January 30, 1959 (age 67); Walnut Creek, California, U.S.
- Genre: Rock
- Occupations: Singer, songwriter, musician
- Instrument: Guitar
- Years active: 1980–present
- Labels: Decor, Cooking Vinyl, Thirsty Ear, New West, Matador, Diablo, Warner Bros.
- Website: markeitzel.com

Mark Eitzel (born January 30, 1959) is an American musician, best known as a songwriter and lead singer of the San Francisco band American Music Club.

== Biography ==
Eitzel spent his formative years in a military family living in Okinawa, Taiwan, Ohio and the United Kingdom. He moved to San Francisco in 1979, and came out as gay in 1985.

He started making music while he was a teenager in Southampton, England. His first band was a punk band called the Cowboys when he moved to Columbus, Ohio, at 19. They released one single in 1980. His second band was called The Naked Skinnies and they released one single in 1981. He moved to San Francisco with The Naked Skinnies in 1981 where they disbanded in 1982. Eitzel formed American Music Club (AMC) in San Francisco in 1982. The band performed and created albums for twelve years. At one point, Eitzel also sang with San Francisco's Toiling Midgets, and often recorded solo work while involved in AMC.

American Music Club disbanded in 1994, and Eitzel focused on his solo career, releasing 60 Watt Silver Lining in 1996. Also in 1996, Eitzel contributed to the AIDS benefit album Offbeat: A Red Hot Soundtrip produced by the Red Hot Organization. Following this, he released West in 1997, co-writing all of the songs with the R.E.M. guitarist Peter Buck, with whom he also toured. He followed up with Caught in a Trap and I Can't Back out 'Cause I Love You Too Much, Baby, assisted by Steve Shelley of Sonic Youth and the Yo La Tengo bass guitarist James McNew.

Eitzel released more music in 2001, beginning with a more electronic turn in The Invisible Man on Matador Records. This was followed by two covers projects in 2002: Music for Courage and Confidence, which was material written by other songwriters, and The Ugly American, an album which included reinterpretations of American Music Club songs performed with a band of traditional and non traditional Greek musicians.

American Music Club reformed in 2003 for a sold out show at the South Bank Centre in London. In the following year, they released Love Songs For Patriots and toured both the United States and Europe several times. The album received glowing reviews across the world. In 2008, the band line-up changed again and the band released The Golden Age which Uncut magazine said was their best since Mercury with a 5-star album of the month review.

Eitzel released a compilation album of electronic soundtrack material in 2005, Candy Ass. In 2009, Klamath was released on Decor Records. Uncut magazine said it was his best solo album yet. In 2010, the musical Marine Parade was premiered in the 2010 Brighton Festival. The musical was written by Simon Stephens and Eitzel wrote all of the music and used two of the songs from Klamath. It received good reviews. He also contributed a cover version of the Ira Gershwin song "'S Wonderful" to the soundtrack of Vidal Sassoon - The Movie. The film was directed by Craig Teper, and the soundtrack was produced by David Spelman. The soundtrack also included music by the post-rock chamber ensembles Clogs (featuring Padma Newsome and Bryce Dessner of The National), Redhooker, and the Arcade Fire side project Bell Orchestre. The film had its premiere at the 2010 Tribeca Film Festival.

In addition to the above albums, Eitzel has also released many mail order tour CDs, his most recent being the limited edition (500 copies) Brannan St., which is available at his concert dates and at the Decor records website. His eleventh solo studio album, Don’t Be a Stranger, was released in October 2012 on Merge Records and produced by Sheldon Gomberg.

== Discography ==
With American Music Club

- The Restless Stranger (Grifter, 1985)
- Engine (Frontier, 1987)
- California (Frontier, 1988)
- United Kingdom (Demon, 1989)
- Everclear (Alias, 1991)
- Mercury (Reprise, 1993)
- San Francisco (Reprise, 1994)
- Love Songs for Patriots (Cooking Vinyl, 2004)
- The Golden Age (Merge, 2008)
- Atwater Afternoon (self-released, 2008)

Solo

- Mean Mark Eitzel Gets Fat (self-released cassette, 1982)
- Songs of Love (Diablo, 1991)
- 60 Watt Silver Lining (Warner Bros., 1996)
- Lover's Leap USA (self-released, 1997)
- Words and Music (1997)
- West (Warner Bros., 1997)
- Caught in a Trap and I Can't Back Out 'Cause I Love You Too Much, Baby (Matador, 1998)
- Live on WFMU (self-released, 2001)
- Superhits International (Demos 1999) (self-released, 2001)
- The Invisible Man (Matador, 2001)
- Music for Courage and Confidence (New West, 2002)
- The Ugly American (Soul Sister/Tongue Master/Thirsty Ear, 2003)
- Candy Ass (Cooking Vinyl, 2005)
- Demos Before Love Songs (self-released, 2005)
- Klamath (Decor, 2009)
- Brannan Street (self-released, 2010)
- Don't Be a Stranger (Merge, 2012)
- Glory (self-released, 2013)
- The Konk Sessions (self-released, 2013)
- Hey Mr. Ferryman (Merge/Decor, 2017)
- Copenhagen (self-released, 2017)

With Cowboys

- "Supermarket"/"Teenage Life" 7" single (Tet Offensive, 1980)

With The Naked Skinnies

- "All My Life"/"This Is the Beautiful Night" 7" single (Naked House, 1981)

With Toiling Midgets

- Son (Matador, 1992)

In collaboration

- Mark Eitzel & Peter Buck: Words + Music (Warner Bros., 1997)
