= Jeffrey Luck Lucas =

American musician (born 1962)

- Born: Donald Jeffrey Lucas; September 23, 1962 (age 64); Gary, Indiana, United States
- Origin: San Francisco
- Genres: folk, alternative rock, chamber pop
- Occupations: Musician, songwriter, composer, arranger
- Instruments: Singer-songwriter, multi-instrumentalist
- Years active: 1984–1987, 2003–present
- Labels: Evangeline, Antebellum
- Website: www.jeffreylucklucas.com

Jeffrey Luck Lucas (born Donald Jeffrey Lucas; September 23, 1962, in Gary, Indiana) is an American musician. A singer-songwriter, composer, and arranger, he is also a former and founding member of the seminal 1980s garage band The Morlocks, as well as a formally trained composer and cellist. After a somewhat lengthy hiatus, Jeffrey is currently performing under the name YOUR STRANGER STRANGER.

== Discography ==
=== Albums ===
- Just A Scream (Greenhaus Recording Co., 1985)
- Hell Then Divine (Antebellum, 2004)
- What We Whisper (Antebellum, 2006)
- The Lion's Jaw (Growler Recording Co., 2010)
- FLOORS (Camus, 2026)

=== Compilations ===
- "Cascade" on Comes with a Smile Vol. 10 (Comes with a Smile Magazine, 2004)
- "Agnes, Queen of Sorrow" on I Am A Cold Rock, I Am Dull Grass, a tribute to Will Oldham (Tract, 2005)
- "Whiteout" on Songs For Another Place (Awful Bliss, 2006)
- "Pale Silver Eyes" on Eye of the Beholder IV (Tract, 2007)

=== Other contributions ===
- Cello/arrangements on Steve Von Till's A Grave Is A Grim Horse
- Cello on Neurosis' The Eye of Every Storm
- Cello on Chuck Prophet's Age Of Miracles
- Cello on The Cult Inside My Head's (Pat Ryan of A Subtle Plague) Stalking Horse and Omnipowerless
- Cello on Paula Frazer's Now It's Time
- Cello/arrangements, bass, guitar, keys, backing vocals on Kira Lynn Cain's The Ideal Hunter
- Cello on Tom Heyman's Deliver Me
- Cello, backing vocals on Bob Frank and John Murry's Gunplay EP
- Cello on The Dirty Pictures' Shuttin' Out The World
- Cello on Rykarda Parasol's Our Hearts First Meet
- Cello on Highwater Rising's Summer Somewhere
- Cello on SF Seals' (Barbara Manning) Truth Walks in Sleepy Shadows
- Cello and backing vocals on Amee Chapman's Still Life
