= The Sleepers (San Francisco band) =

American punk/rock band

- Origin: Palo Alto, California, United States
- Genres: Punk rock; rock; post-punk
- Years active: 1978, 1980–1981
- Past members: Ricky Williams; Michael Belfer; Paul Draper; Tim Mooney; Brian MacLeod; Ron MacLeod; Mike White

The Sleepers was a San Francisco-based band, formed in 1978. They were one of the earliest punk bands in San Francisco, and later took on a darker, moodier post-punk sound before breaking up in 1981.

The band was made up of vocalist/lyricist Ricky Williams, guitarist Michael Belfer, bassist Paul Draper, and drummer Tim Mooney.

== Biography ==
The Sleepers formed in Palo Alto, California, in 1978. Michael Belfer had been trying to form a band with his friend, Tim Mooney, and Belfer had decided he wanted former Crime drummer Ricky Williams for vocals, as "he was so awesome looking". The band released a five-track 7-inch EP in late 1978, and then broke up, with Belfer playing in Tuxedomoon during 1978 and 1979, and Williams co-founding Flipper, from which he was fired before the band made any recordings "for being too weird".

In 1980, the band reformed and released a single, "Mirror"/"Theory", and an album, Painless Nights. The new lineup on the LP featured Brian MacLeod (drums), Ron MacLeod (bass), and Mike White (guitar/effects). Williams' abuse of speed led to erratic and violent behavior, which culminated in his passing out on stage on the second date of the group's East Coast tour at New York's Hurrah. The band broke up onstage after this incident.

Michael Belfer returned to college and graduated in composition and cultural studies. He played guitar and keyboards in Black Lab from 1996 to 1999. Michael Belfer died on March 20, 2022. Williams went on to handle vocals in Toiling Midgets, and later died of a heroin overdose at the age of 36 in 1992. Mooney, who later drummed for the bands American Music Club and Sun Kil Moon, died in June 2012.

== Discography ==
=== Singles & EPs ===
Seventh World 7" EP (1978)

Side One
No.	Title	Length
1.	"Seventh World"
2.	"No Time"
3.	"Flying"

Side Two
No.	Title	Length
1.	"She's Fun"
2.	"Linda"

Mirror / Theory 7" Single (1980)

Side One
No.	Title	Length
1.	"Mirror"

Side Two
No.	Title	Length
1.	"Theory"

Holding Back 1994 7" single, recorded 1980

Side One
No.	Title	Length
1.	"Holding Back"

Side Two
No.	Title	Length
1.	"B Side"

=== LPs ===
Painless Nights (1980)

Side One
No.	Title	Length
1.	"When Can I Fly?"
2.	"Walk Away"
3.	"The Mind"
4.	"Intro"
5.	"Forever"

Side Two
No.	Title	Length
1.	"Zenith"
2.	"Theory"
3.	"B-Side"
4.	"Los Gatos"

=== Compilations ===
The Less an Object (complete discography compilation album)

No.	Title	Length
1.	"Seventh World" (alternate version)
2.	"No Time"
3.	"Flying"
4.	"She's Fun"
5.	"Linda"
6.	"Mirror"
7.	"Theory"
8.	"Holding Back"
9.	"When Can I Fly"
10.	"Walk Away"
11.	"The Mind"
12.	"Intro"
13.	"Forever"
14.	"Zenith/Theory"
15.	"B-Side"
16.	"Los Gatos"
17.	"Step Back" (previously unreleased)
18.	"Let Me Free" (previously unreleased)
