= Tim Mooney =

American drummer

- Born: October 6, 1958; Las Vegas, Nevada, U.S.
- Died: June 13, 2012 (aged 53) Nevada City, California, U.S.
- Genre: Punk rock
- Occupations: Musician, drummer, composer, arranger, producer, engineer
- Instruments: Drummer, record producer, multi-instrumentalist
- Years active: 1970s–2012
- Labels: Closer Recording, Ausgang Audio

Tim Mooney (October 6, 1958 – June 13, 2012) was an American drummer, producer, and sound engineer. He drummed in (or with) the Sleepers, Toiling Midgets, Negative Trend, Sun Kil Moon, John Murry and American Music Club.

== Musical career ==
In the 1970s and 1980s, Mooney played drums for a number of San Francisco punk and rock bands for The Sleepers (San Francisco band), Toiling Midgets, Negative Trend, and many others. Mooney became a member of American Music Club in 1991. His last album with the band was Love Songs for Patriots (2004), which he also produced and engineered. In 1998, Tim married Jude Mooney and had his only child, Dixie Mooney in 2000. Mooney moved to Petaluma, California in 1999. On June 13, 2012, Mooney died at age 53 due to complications from a heart attack. He was mourned by his former bandmates Mark Eitzel and Mark Kozelek.

== In popular culture ==
Mooney's death immediately preceded the release of John Murry’s “The Graceless Age”, which was produced by Mooney, and is directly referenced by John Murry in the song “Timmy” from his 10” Califorlornia and by Murry in interviews related to the album, as well as by former Sun Kil Moon bandmate Mark Kozelek on the song "Tavoris Cloud" from his studio album Mark Kozelek & Desertshore, and on the song "Last Night I Rocked the Room Like Elvis and Had Them Laughing Like Richard Pryor" from Sun Kil Moon and Jesu's Jesu/Sun Kil Moon.

== Discography ==
- Love Songs for Patriots (2004) – drummer, guitarist, producer, engineer
- The Green Door by The Green Door (2011) – producer and engineer
- The Graceless Age by John Murry (2012) - producer, engineer, drums, various instruments
