= Vudi =

American musician

Vudi is the nickname of Mark Pankler (born 22 September 1952, Chicago), guitarist with San Francisco-based indie rock band American Music Club. He is also the vocalist and guitarist in San Francisco indie rock band Clovis de Floret.

Vudi also played guitar and keyboards with Swans on their 1995 tour, and hence appeared on the double live album Swans Are Dead. During this period he also recorded various songs with the band which were included on their album Soundtracks for the Blind. He also played guitar on one song on Danish band Pocket Life's 2013 album Rattle When You Walk. He played guitar on Jenifer McKitrick's live single "All My Lies", and three songs on her album Road Call, released December 1, 2022.
