= American Music Club =

American indie rock band

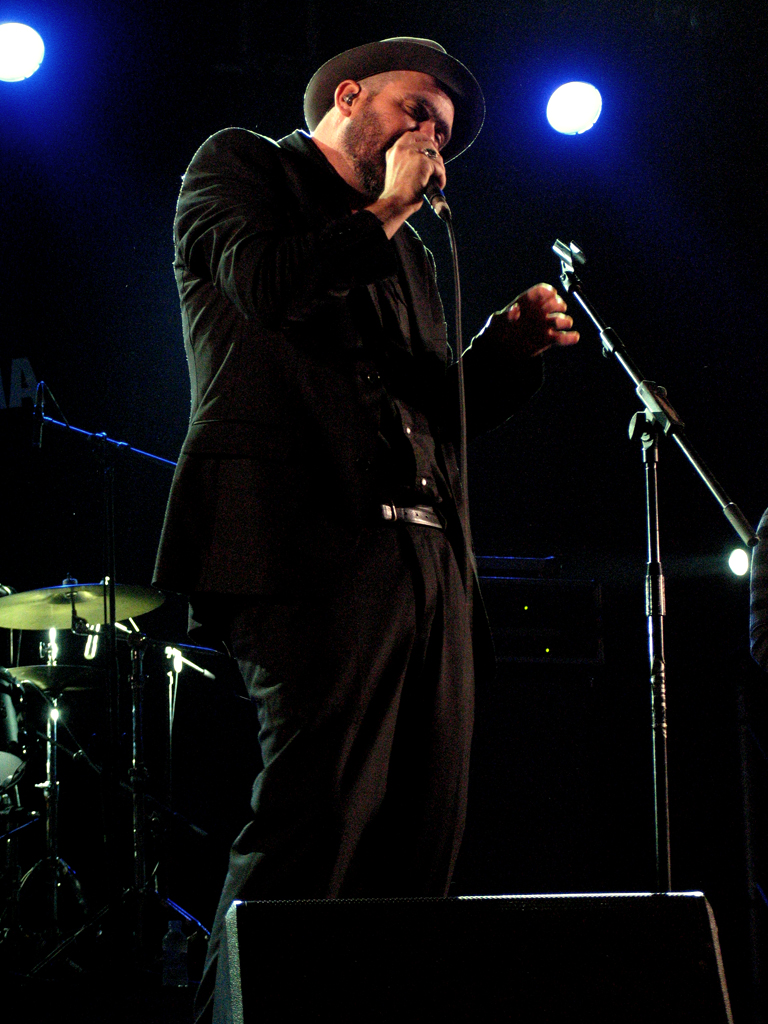
- Mark Eitzel performing with American Music Club, 2008

Background information
- Origin: San Francisco, California, U.S.
- Genres: Indie rock; folk rock; slowcore
- Years active: 1982–1994, 2004–2010
- Labels: Cooking Vinyl; Merge; Reprise; Virgin; Frontier; Grifter; Zippo; Warner Bros.; Demon; Alias
- Past members: Mark Eitzel; Scott Alexander; Greg Bonnell; Brad Johnson; Vudi; Danny Pearson; Matt Norelli; Tom Mallon; Lisa Davis; Mike Simms; Bruce Kaphan; Tim Mooney; Marc Capelle; Steve Didelot; Sean Hoffman; Lliam Hart
- Website: american-music-club.com

American Music Club was an American, San Francisco-based indie rock band, led by singer-songwriter Mark Eitzel. Formed in 1982, the band released seven albums before splitting up in 1995. They reformed in 2003 and released two further albums before splitting up again in 2010.

== History ==
=== Roots and initial formation ===
Although born in California, Eitzel spent his formative years in Okinawa (Japan), Taiwan, Southampton (the United Kingdom) and Ohio (United States) before returning to the Bay Area in 1981. After a brief stint with the bands The Cowboys (one single: "Supermarket"/"Teenage Life") and The Naked Skinnies (one single) he founded American Music Club in San Francisco in 1983 with guitarist Scott Alexander, drummer Greg Bonnell and bass player Brad Johnson.

Initially an art-punk band with a strong performance art element, American Music Club eventually ditched those initial stylings and began to incorporate roots music elements including folk-rock and country music. The band went through many personnel changes before arriving at a consistent line up of Eitzel on vocals, guitar and songwriting, guitarist Vudi (Mark Pankler), bassist/mandolinist Danny Pearson and drummer Matt Norelli, with founder member Johnson moving to keyboards. This line-up would change over the next several years (with drummers in particular coming and going, notably Tim Mooney), but Eitzel always remained the core of the band in terms of its vocals, lyrics and thematic focus, with Vudi and Pearson accompanying him on guitar and bass. Eitzel's performance style remained spontaneous, emotional, unguardedly volatile and sometimes destructive, with the other musicians concentrating on providing a stable musical framework for his songs.

=== Early records: The Restless Stranger and Engine (1985-1987) ===
American Music Club's 1985 debut, The Restless Stranger, released on Grifter Records, mixed post-punk and country elements and is widely considered as the first slowcore release, establishing the band as major pioneers of slowcore and an early influence on post-rock. With Johnson and Norelli departing (although the latter continued to help out on recording sessions), the band followed up The Restless Stranger with 1987's Engine, a more diverse and exploratory release which saw the band experiment further with roots rock, melodic hardcore and all points in between.

The Engine sessions saw Tom Mallon, the band's record producer and engineer, gradually join as a full-time member. A multi-instrumentalist who'd made multiple uncredited instrumental additions and alterations to American Music Club's tracks while producing them, Mallon initially joined as drummer, although his ongoing producer's role and notorious perfectionism also gave him a more prominent role within the band (and also created tension).

=== California and United Kingdom (1987-1990) ===
American Music Club earned a solid cult following in Europe on the strength of 1988's more folk and country-tinged California. In an attempt to tighten up the band's music when performing live, Lisa Davis (who'd played on California's opening track "Firefly") was recruited as the full-time bass player, allowing Pearson to concentrate on rhythm guitar and mandolin so that Eitzel, in turn, could concentrate on singing. Davis' stint was short-lived, in part due to a combustible relationship with Mallon which ultimately resulted in her departure. Mallon then moved to bass guitar (his preferred role) while Mike Simms was recruited as the new drummer.

The band's next LP, 1989's United Kingdom, was a UK-only release comprising new material, some of which was recorded live at the Hotel Utah in San Francisco. California and United Kingdom would later be described by Ian Canadine in Rock: The Rough Guide as "the band's two unequivocal masterpieces".

Following the release of United Kingdom, American Music Club fell out terminally with Tom Mallon during a band rehearsal. Mallon then kicked them out of the studio, quit the band and cut ties with them. Disheartened at the loss of a steady line-up, plus their recording and production arrangements, the band temporarily dispersed. Eitzel joined art-punks Toiling Midgets, writing and recording the Son album with them. About a year later, American Music Club reconvened, enticing Eitzel back, returning Pearson to bass and adding multi-instrumentalist Bruce Kaphan (who'd previously guested on pedal steel guitar on California, and who now added the instrument full-time to the band in addition to keyboards, dulcimer and extra guitars).

=== Everclear and Mercury (1991-1993) ===
In 1991 American Music Club released the self-produced Everclear. Like Engine, it was an eclectic record which juggled alt.rock, rockabilly, noise-rock and grunge in addition to the country and folk of the California and United Kingdom period. Retrospectively, it has sometimes been described as "more polished and radio-friendly" compared to the previous albums; with Deborah Sprague (writing for Trouser Press) stating that the "slickened production works against the band", while AllMusic writer Jason Ankeny has judged it to be the band's masterpiece. At the time, Rolling Stone hailed Everclear as the Album of the Year for 1991, with Eitzel also named Songwriter of the Year. This level of critical acclaim attracted the attention of several major labels, with American Music Club eventually signing with Reprise in the US and Virgin throughout the rest of the world. Mike Simms was replaced as drummer by a returning Tim Mooney.

The band contributed the track "All Your Jeans Were Too Tight" to the 1993 AIDS-Benefit Album No Alternative produced by the Red Hot Organization. The album Mercury, produced by Mitchell Froom, followed in 1993: building on the stylistic base of Everclear and adding Froom's own particular production quirks. Despite positive reviews (although Canadine considered it over-produced), the album only reached number 41 on the UK Albums Chart and got little radio and television exposure.

=== San Francisco and split (1994-1995) ===
In 1994, AMC followed up Mercury with San Francisco, which balanced confessional tunes like "Fearless" and "The Thorn in My Side Is Gone" alongside more accessible offerings such as "Wish the World Away". Despite ongoing critical acclaim and bigger and more successful headlining dates, the band was failing to gain consistent and significant support from new audiences on the bigger alt.rock tours which they were now undertaking as tour-mates or support bands; and tensions in the band continued to grow, with a disheartened Bruce Kaphan quitting mid-tour.

With Eitzel now signed to publishing deals as an independent songwriter, the balance of power and responsibility in the band had become disrupted. A second attempt by Pearson to stabilise the band's live playing (by returning to guitar and bringing in Dana Schechter as bass player) failed; and when Eitzel demanded total control over song choices, arrangements and direction (in return for funding the band via his publishing income), his bandmates refused. As a result, American Music Club split up decisively in 1995, with Eitzel concentrating on his solo career, having already released a solo live album and an EP as side projects. Vudi subsequently formed Clovis de la Floret while working as a bus driver in Los Angeles and also contributed to Swans. Pearson formed Americana band Clodhopper, and played double bass on Eitzel's tour for his third solo album West in 1997.

=== Reunion, Love Songs for Patriots and The Golden Age, and final split (2003-2010) ===
Despite the splits and tensions, the various members of American Music Club had always stayed in touch and maintained affection (Lisa Davis described their sometimes combative relationships with each other as being like "brothers"). The band reunited in 2003 with Eitzel initially joined by Pearson and Mooney, and later by Vudi and new keyboard player Marc Capelle, to record a new album, Love Songs for Patriots (released in 2004). This was described by AllMusic reviewer Mark Deming as "a stronger and more coherent effort than the group's last set, 1994's San Francisco, and while it's too early to tell if this is a new start or a last hurrah for AMC, it at least shows that their formula still yields potent results. Here's hoping Eitzel and Vudi have more where this came from." A performance in Pittsburgh on November 10, 2004, was released as a live CD, A Toast To You, on January 1, 2005. The band then consisted of Eitzel, Vudi, Pearson, Mooney, and Capelle's replacement Jason Borger on keyboards.

On June 20, 2007, AMC announced a new line-up connected to the band's base of operations moving to Los Angeles. Eitzel and Vudi remained, while Mooney and Pearson left the band to stay behind in San Francisco. (Pearson had released a solo album The Oblivion Seeker in 2004, and would subsequently play with various bands and artists including The Snobs, The Ironics, Tarkio (with Colin Meloy of The Decemberists, Crazy Water String Band and Size Queens; as well as; while Mooney played with Mark Koselek among others.) They were replaced by bassist Sean Hoffman and drummer Steve Didelot from the band The Larks. AMC's next record, The Golden Age, was released in the UK on February 4, 2008, on Cooking Vinyl and in the US on February 19 on Merge Records. A later line-up replaced Hoffman with a returning Dana Schecter on bass, and added Jonathan Heine as second guitarist.

The band split up for the final time in 2010.

=== Post-AMC (2011-present) ===
Following the final split of American Music Club, Eitzel resumed his solo career, while Vudi would play with Jenifer McKitrick and Pocket Life. The band's final bassist, Dana Schecter, continued her work with her two group Bee & Flower and Insect Ark, as well as working with Swans.

Former AMC drummer Tim Mooney died of a blood clot in June 2012; he was 53. The band's former drummer, bassist, producer and engineer Tom Mallon died after a long battle with brain cancer on January 9, 2014; he was 57.

== Discography ==
=== Albums ===
==== Studio ====
Title	Release date	Label	UK Albums Chart
The Restless Stranger	January 1985	Grifter	
Engine	October 1987	Grifter/Zippo	
California	November 1988	Demon/Frontier	
United Kingdom	October 1989	Demon	
Everclear	October 1991	Alias	
Mercury	March 1993	Virgin	41
San Francisco	September 1994	Reprise	72
Love Songs for Patriots	September 2004	Merge	99
The Golden Age	February 2008	Cooking Vinyl	

==== Live ====
- A Toast To You – Live in Pittsburgh, PA, November 10, 2004 (January 2005), Undertow

==== Compilations ====
Title	Release date	Label	Notes
Over And Done	1993	Reprise	Promotional only
New Recordings, Demos & Rough Mixes	2003	Undertow	Promotional only
1984–1995	2005		
The Mercury Band Demos April 1992	2008		
The Everclear Rehearsals Late 1990	2008		
Atwater Afternoon	2008	Undertow	Limited edition CD to promote The Golden Age

=== Singles and EPs ===
Title	Release date	Label	Notes	UK Singles Chart
"Rise"	1991	Alias		
"Why Won't You Stay"	1991	Alias		
"Johnny Mathis' Feet"	1993	Virgin		58
Johnny Mathis' Feet Plus Live Tracks	1993	Reprise	Promotional only	
Soil X Samples 12	1993	Reprise	Promotional only	
"Keep Me Around"	1993	Virgin		
"Over and Done"	1993	Reprise	Promotional only	
"Wish the World Away"	1994	Virgin		46
"Can You Help Me"	1994	Virgin		91
"I'll Be Gone"	1994	Reprise	Promotional only	
"Hello Amsterdam"	1995	Reprise		
"Home"	2004	Cooking Vinyl	Promotional only	
"Another Morning"	2004	Cooking Vinyl	Promotional only	
"Ladies & Gentlemen"	2004	Cooking Vinyl	Promotional only	
"Decibels and the Little Pills"	2007	Cooking Vinyl	Promotional only	
"All The Lost Souls Welcome You To San Francisco"	2008	Cooking Vinyl		

== See also ==
- If I Were a Carpenter
- No Alternative
