= The Subways discography =

The Subways discography contains all works associated with the American rock band the Subways.

== Studio albums ==
List of albums, with selected chart positions and certifications
| Title | Details | Peak chart positions | | | | | | | | | | Certifications |
| Title | Details | UK | UK Indie | AUT | BEL (WA) | FRA | GER | JPN | SCO | SWI | US Heat | Certifications |
|---|---|---|---|---|---|---|---|---|---|---|---|---|
| Young for Eternity | Released: 4 July 2005; Label: Infectious; Formats: CD, download | 32 | 9 | — | 73 | — | 65 | — | 17 | — | 15 | BPI: Gold |
| All or Nothing | Released: 30 June 2008; Label: Warner; Formats: CD, download | 17 | 11 | 42 | 67 | 190 | 18 | 65 | 22 | 40 | — | |
| Money and Celebrity | Released: 19 September 2011; Label: Cooking Vinyl, Warner; Formats: CD, download | 43 | 8 | 51 | — | — | 16 | 147 | 46 | 58 | — | |
| The Subways | Released: 6 February 2015; Label: Cooking Vinyl; Formats: CD, download | 45 | 8 | 63 | — | — | 30 | — | 57 | — | — | |
| Uncertain Joys | Released: 13 January 2023; Label: Alcopop!; Formats: CD, download | — (Note: "Uncertain Joys" did not enter the UK Singles Chart, but peaked at number 74 on the UK Albums Downloads Chart.) | 39 | — | — | — | — | — | — | — | — | |
"—" denotes a title that did not chart.

== EPs ==
- The Platypus EP (2000)
- I Lost You to the City EP (2002)
- Summertime EP (2003)
- Rock & Roll Queen EP (2004)
- No Heart No Soul EP (2005)
- Young for Eternity EP
- At 1am EP (2005)
- Milk EP (2004)
- Mary EP
- Live at Birmingham Academy EP
- The Live Videos EP (iTunes only)
- Live and Acoustic in Magdeburg EP (iTunes only, 2007)
- Live at Abbey Road EP (2008)
- Live at iTunes Festival Berlin (iTunes only, 2008)
- The Brown Couch Sessions Live (Gonzo live, 2008)
- We Don't Need Money to Have a Good Time EP (iTunes only, 2011)
- It's a Party EP (iTunes only, 2011)
- Kiss Kiss Bang Bang EP (iTunes only, 2015)
- Acoustic Adventures at Yfe Studios (2016)

== Singles ==
| Title | Year | Peak chart positions | | | | | | | Album | Certifications |
| Title | Year | UK | UK Indie | BEL (FL) | GER | ITA | SCO | US Alt | Album | Certifications |
|---|---|---|---|---|---|---|---|---|---|---|
| "Oh Yeah" | 2005 | 25 | — | — | — | — | 26 | — | | Young for Eternity |
| "Rock & Roll Queen" | 2005 | 22 | — | — | 92 | 37 | 27 | 29 | BPI: Silver | Young for Eternity |
| "With You" | 2005 | 29 | — | — | — | — | 34 | — | | Young for Eternity |
| "No Goodbyes" | 2005 | 27 | — | — | — | — | 32 | — | | Young for Eternity |
| "Alright" | 2008 | 44 | — | — | — | — | 15 | — | | All or Nothing |
| "I Won't Let You Down" | 2008 | 137 | — | — | — | — | 41 | — | | All or Nothing |
| "We Don't Need Money to Have a Good Time" | 2011 | — | 34 | 63 | — | — | — | — | | Money and Celebrity |
| "It's a Party!" | 2012 | — | — | — | — | — | — | — | | Money and Celebrity |
| "Kiss Kiss Bang Bang" | 2012 | — (Note: "Kiss Kiss Bang Bang" did not enter the UK Singles Chart, but peaked at number 13 on the UK Physical Singles Chart Top 100.) | — | — | — | — | — | — | | Money and Celebrity |
| "My Heart Is Pumping to a Brand New Beat" | 2014 | — (Note: "My Heart Is Pumping to a Brand New Beat" did not enter the UK Singles Chart, but peaked at number 26 on the UK Physical Singles Chart Top 100.) | — | — | — | — | — | — | | The Subways |
| "I'm in Love and It's Burning in My Soul" | 2014 | — | — | — | — | — | — | — | | The Subways |
| "Taking All the Blame" | 2015 | — (Note: "Taking All the Blame" did not enter the UK Singles Chart, but peaked at number 78 on the UK Physical Singles Chart Top 100.) | — | — | — | — | — | — | | The Subways |
| "Fight" | 2021 | — (Note: "Fight" did not enter the UK Singles Chart, but peaked at number 71 on the UK Singles Sales Chart Top 100.) | — | — | — | — | — | — | | Uncertain Joys |
| "You Kill My Cool" | 2022 | — (Note: "You Kill My Cool" did not enter the UK Singles Chart, but peaked at number four on the UK Physical Singles Chart Top 100.) | — | — | — | — | — | — | | Uncertain Joys |
| "Oh Yeah (Taken Over)" | 2023 | — (Note: "Oh Yeah (Taken Over)" did not enter the UK Singles Chart, but peaked at number 48 on the UK Singles Sales Chart Top 100.) | — | — | — | — | — | — | | Non-album single |
"—" denotes releases that did not chart or were not released in that territory.

=== Promotional singles ===
| Title | Year | Album |
|---|---|---|
| "At 1am" | 2004 | Young for Eternity |
| "Girls & Boys" | 2008 | All or Nothing |

== Music videos ==
| Year | Video |
|---|---|
| 2004 | "At 1 am" |
| 2005 | "Oh Yeah" |
| 2005 | "No Goodbyes" |
| 2005 | "With You" |
| 2005 | "Rock & Roll Queen" |
| 2008 | "Girls & Boys" |
| 2008 | "Alright" |
| 2008 | "I Won't Let You Down" |
| 2008 | "This Is the Club for People Who Hate People" |
| 2008 | "Shake! Shake!" |
| 2009 | "Rock & Roll Summer" (live) |
| 2011 | "It's a Party!" |
| 2011 | "We Don't Need Money to Have a Good Time" |
| 2012 | "Kiss Kiss Bang Bang" |
| 2014 | "My Heart Is Pumping to a Brand New Beat" |
| 2014 | "I'm in Love and It's Burning in My Soul" |
| 2015 | "Taking All the Blame" |
| 2015 | "Good Times" |

== Compilation appearances ==
| Year | Album title | Label |
|---|---|---|
| 2004 | Glastonbury Unsigned 2004 | Concrete Recordings |
| 2005 | Music from the OC: Mix 5 | Warner Bros./Wea |
| 2006 | Transgressive Singles Collection Vol.1 | Wea |
| 2006 | Rescue Me (soundtrack) | Nettwerk Records |
| 2007 | Charlie Bartlett (soundtrack) | Lakeshore records |
| 2008 | RocknRolla (soundtrack) | Universal Music |
| 2008 | Die Welle (soundtrack) | EMI – Germany |
