= Music on The O.C. =

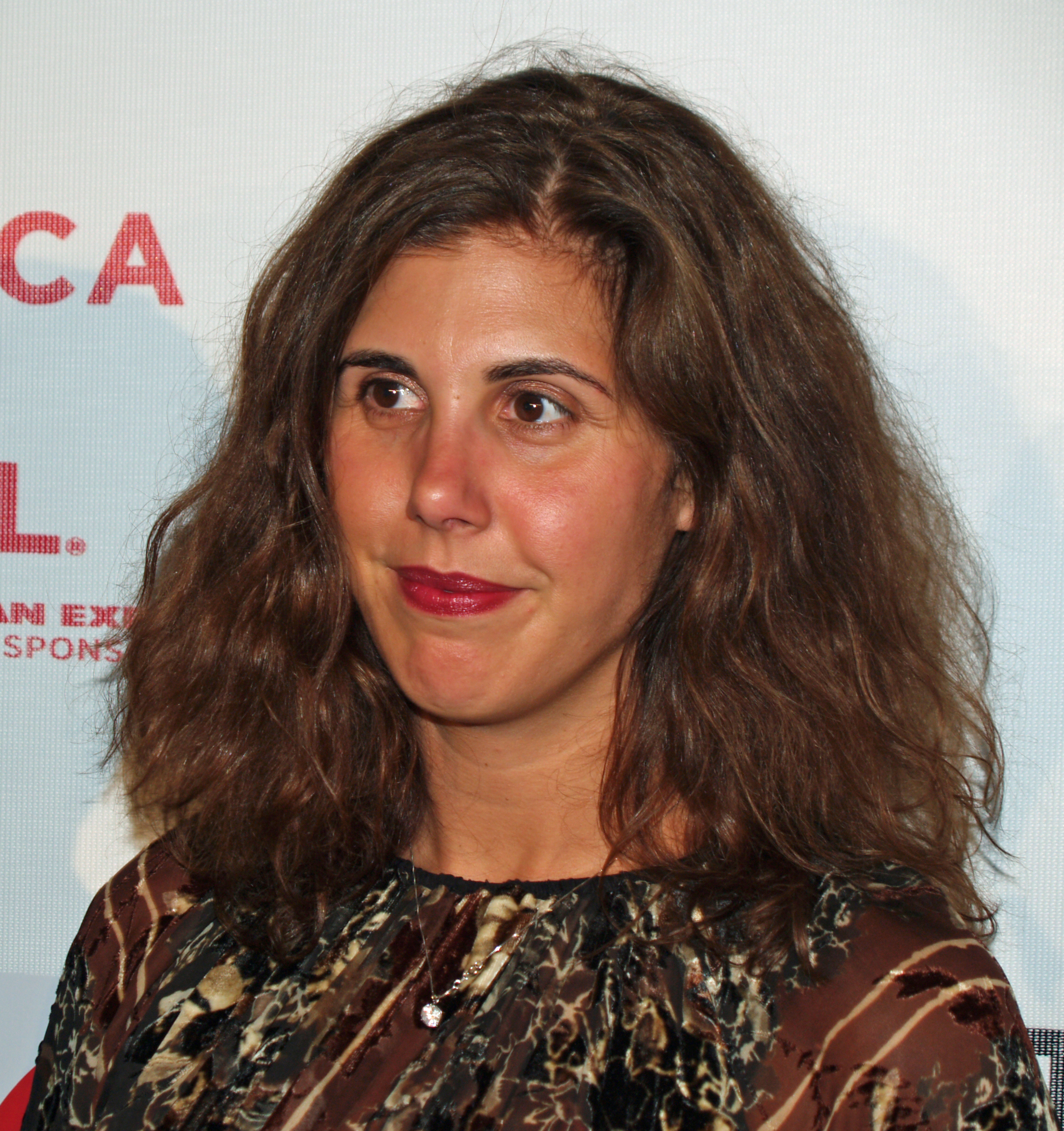
Music supervisor Alexandra Patsavas, who was responsible for much of the music selection in the episodes

The use of music on FOX drama The O.C. gained much acclaim. Show creator Josh Schwartz wanted music to be a "character on the show" and the experienced Alexandra Patsavas took the role of music supervisor. The show's orchestral music was composed by Christopher Tyng. The series is credited with showcasing many artists, and helping to elevate them in the music business. Many acts made guest appearances on the show, and others premiered their new singles in episodes. Six official soundtrack albums were released, and these were compilations of predominantly indie music.

== History ==
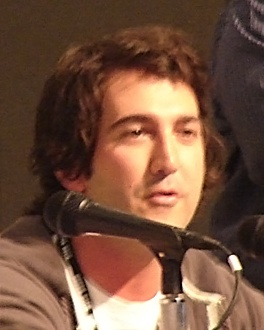
Show creator Josh Schwartz, who wanted music to feature prominently in the show

Alexandra Patsavas, who had previously worked on shows including Roswell and Carnivàle, was appointed as music supervisor on The O.C.. Patsavas worked alongside creator Josh Schwartz, in selecting the music to be used. In an interview with IGN, Schwartz said that he had "always intended that music be a character on the show" and music was selected in two ways: either it was written into the script or it was selected to suit a scene. Patsavas stated that Schwartz scripted a lot of the music, with some songs being selected before she saw the episode script. For example, for an episode Schwartz had scripted a cover of "Champagne Supernova", got permission from Oasis and collaborated with band Matt Pond PA to write a cover of it for the show. On another occasion Schwartz went to Phantom Planet and asked for a mellow version of California. The reason "California" became the theme to show was because "Josh Schwartz loved the way it worked in a scene in the pilot." At other times they watch the episodes' editors cut and pitch song ideas for specific scenes. Each week Patsavas created a compilation from the new releases sent into the producers, and at times they were being "sent around 400 or 500 CD's a week". Fox and The O.C. made indie rock a "main focus of the series" and also its marketing plan. Christopher Tyng, who composed the theme for Futurama, composed the show's orchestral music which included the ending theme.

Shawn Rogers, Sub Pop's creative director of film and TV licensing, said that the show's choice of music was to "support bands and the style of music that they've been following" adding that artists were willing because "it pays well in comparison to what most indie bands make touring". However, Jimmy Tamborello, producer for The Postal Service, commented that it was just because "we're cheaper". Although exact figures are not known, Les Watkins, a music lawyer from Los Angeles, estimated that "a song by an emerging artist could fetch up to $20,000 or $30,000" and this is jointly split between record label and the songwriter/publisher. He stated that "once lawyers, managers, and the rest of the entourage get their piece, the artist may only see a fraction of the payout."

== Artist performances ==
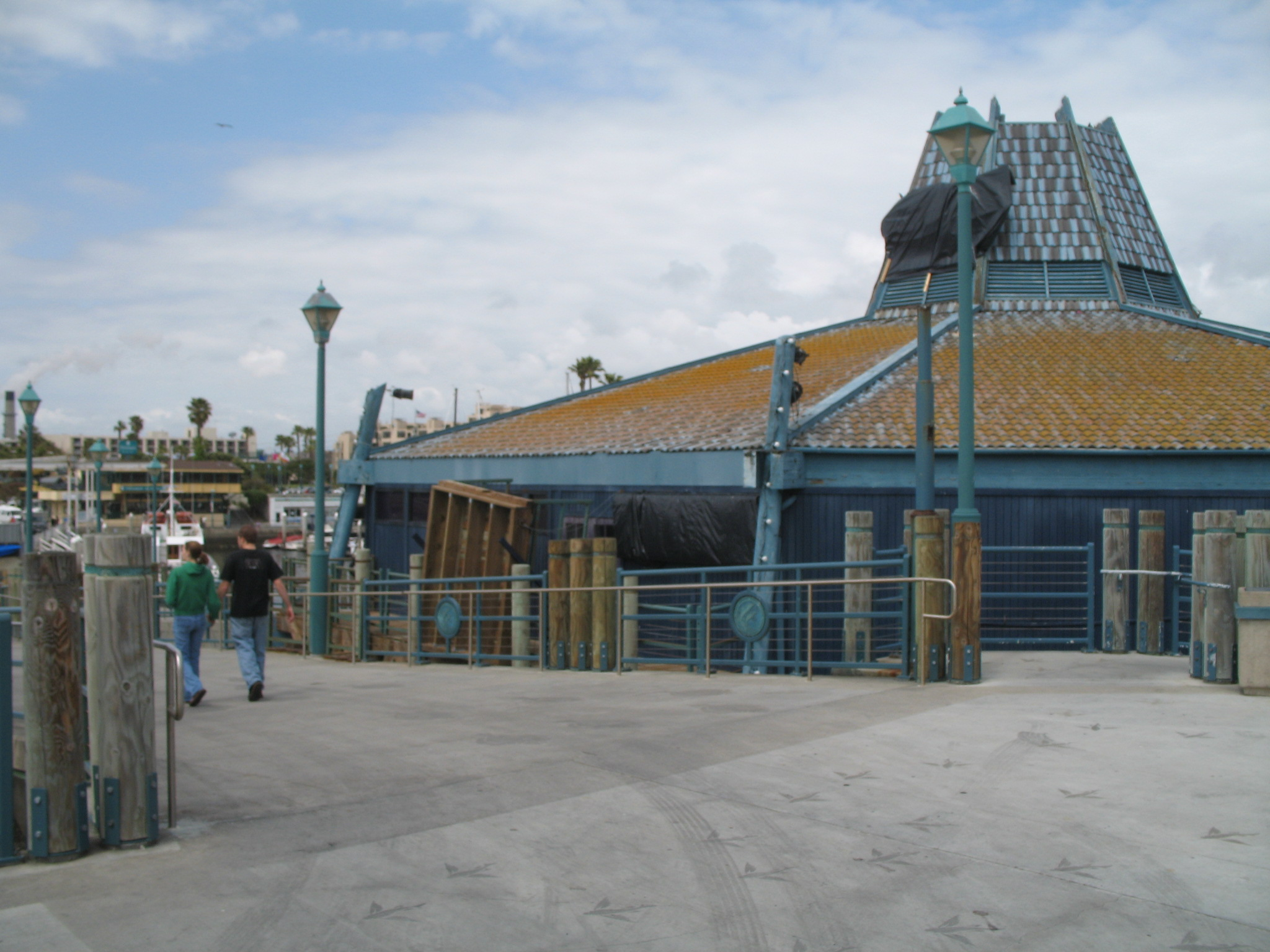
The filming location of The Bait Shop, the concert venue that stages performances in the second and third seasons

=== The Bait Shop ===
The Bait Shop is introduced in the second season as a new night club and concert venue on the pier. It was an undeniable reference to Beverly Hills, 90210's "Peach Pit". New character Alex works there and Schwartz described her as "our 'Nat', if you will." Schwartz described the venue:

Basically the Bait Shop is a little bit modeled after clubs like The Troubadour in Los Angeles or CBGB in New York, meaning it's kind of got more of a down, kind of older feel. It's on the pier and the idea was that maybe, once upon a time, it was an actual bait shop and now it's been converted into this rock club. I think it's really cool. It's got a lot of texture to it. It's got a lot of grit to it. It's been a great set for us and it's a great place for the kids to hang out. Because it's pier-adjacent, we get to go out there and shoot out by the water at night, too. I think it's just going to be a real iconic set for the show."

The actual filming location was the northeast corner of Redondo Beach pier.

=== Guest appearances ===
Rooney were the first act to perform on the show when the adolescents go to a concert as part of the episode "The Third Wheel". For the first-season finale, singer Jem performed a cover of Paul McCartney's "Maybe I'm Amazed". For the second season, a club called the Bait Shop was introduced, and early on in the season the bands The Walkmen, The Killers, and Modest Mouse all featured on the show playing at the club. Although not strictly playing himself, actor Peter Gallagher (as Sandy Cohen) had previously sung on Broadway and in the episode "The Power of Love" he serenades his wife Kirsten by singing a cover of Solomon Burke's "Don't Give Up on Me" at The Bait Shop. Other artists to perform at the club that season were The Thrills, Rachael Yamagata, and Death Cab for Cutie. In the episode "The Return of the Nana", Seth and Ryan visit Miami, and end up at a spring break style party where rapper T.I. guest stars as himself. For the third season, The Subways, Tom Vek, and Cobra Verde all made guest appearances performing in The Bait Shop.

=== Premieres ===
In addition to having guest artists perform on the show, it also premiered many new music tracks: The Beastie Boys single "Ch-Check It Out" debuted on the show in the episode "The Strip" that aired April 28, 2004. During the second season, U2 debuted their song "Sometimes You Can't Make It On Your Own" at the end of an episode on December 2, 2004. Gwen Stefani debuted her single "Cool" in an episode on December 9, 2004. In promoting his new album, Guero, Beck debuted five tracks from the album on March 10, 2005, with that week's installment being dubbed a "Beckisode" by the media. Another music premiere was Coldplay's song "Fix You", which debuted on May 12, 2005, in the final scene of the episode in which characters find out Caleb had a fatal heart attack. Imogen Heap, a former member of Frou Frou, had her new single debut on the show on May 19, 2005 – "Hide and Seek" featured twice in the episode "The Dearly Beloved". The single "Turn on Me" from band The Shins was first played in "The French Connection" on January 11, 2007.

== Reception ==
"[The O.C.] was probably the most music-intensive youthful-angst series in TV history, displaying a keen-eared knack for picking hip new acts early in the game."

— Ken Barnes of USA Today

The show was heavily praised for its music. The New York Times described Schwartz as "the Shiva of contemporary music" and IGN described Patsavas as a "consummate tastemaker" for the show. Chris Carle from IGN described the show as "a staging area for quality music", and Ben Spier from Entertainment Weekly described the show as a "mixtaper's dream" Catherine Elsworth of The Daily Telegraph described the events of The O.C. as being set "to a scrupulously hip soundtrack" and in another article stated that a "vital ingredient of his winning formula is the soundtrack, which draws on a broad range of modern alternative rock". Emily Zemler of PopMatters.com commented that the "writers seem to have impressive musical taste" and Barnes & Noble said that there was "probably no other show on television today where music is as important as it is on FOX's hit drama The O.C." Rolling Stone commented that the soundtrack was the reason people kept watching the show. However, when the show premiered U2's single "Sometimes You Can't Make It on Your Own" Karyn L. Barr from Entertainment Weekly stated that the show that dedicated time to indie bands was "selling out." The Bait Shop inspired a club night at Barfly in Cardiff, featuring music similar to that featured on the show, but Noah Davis of PopMatters.com criticised the show for its "plots [that] were largely replaced by the gang's countless trips to the Bait Shop"

== Artist promotion ==
Throughout the show, Death Cab for Cutie have "occupied a minor role on The O.C. as Seth Cohen's favorite band." Amy Phillips of Willamette Week described the band, within the context of the show, as follows. "Death Cab for Cutie is Seth Cohen's favorite band. He's got a Death Cab poster on his bedroom wall, plays Death Cab music in the car, gives Death Cab CDs to girls he likes." She also added at the time that "the more popular the character has become, the more fans the band has gained". Talking about their exposure on the show, Death Cab bass player Nick Harmer said that "there's really no other shows on television right now, other than 'The O.C.' that's really kind of showcasing bands in such a straightforward way."

Hamilton Leithauser vocalist for The Walkmen said he considered "television performances as a solid, if ephemeral, means of promotion", but not all bands were eager to release their music for television shows. James Mercer, frontman for The Shins noted "that artists lose creative control" in the way that a song is interpreted, when the music is set to a particular scene. Additionally, fans and critics have stated that such appearances and mass marketing techniques are creating sell-outs. Indie band Clap Your Hands Say Yeah were asked to perform on the show, but they turned it down because they were worried that it could diminish their credibility. Frontman Alec Ounsworth said "I don't like the idea of being overexposed", adding that it was analogous to the fact that "Vincent van Gogh never sold a painting, and he was perfectly content".

However, it was a successful method of promotion. Rooney experienced a "200 percent increase in sales" after being featured on the show. When "Youth Group, recorded a just-for-The-O.C. cover of "Forever Young" [the song] registered more than 5,000 iTunes downloads its first week" The Daily Telegraph stated that indie duo Viva Voce had "their profile sent through the roof with a guest slot on the soundtrack to teens-in-trouble TV drama The O.C.". Imogen Heap became "a household name stateside." The series was "responsible for 7 Days in Memphis, the debut solo album from Peter Gallagher" as well as "help[ing] launch The Killers to mass mainstream success"

== Music from The O.C. ==
Music from The O.C.

Compilation album by Various artists
- Released: Mix 1: March 30, 2004; Mix 2: October 26, 2004; Mix 3: October 26, 2004; Mix 4: April 5, 2005; Mix 5: November 8, 2005; Mix 6: December 5, 2006
- Label: Warner Bros./WEA Professional reviews: Mix 1; MSN Music link Mix 2; MSN Music link; IGN (8.7/10) link Mix 3; IGN (8.9/10) link Mix 4; Rolling Stone link; IGN (8.5/10) link Mix 5; IGN (8/10) link Mix 6; IGN (7/10) link; Pitchfork Media (1.8/10) link; Allmusic - link

The O.C. released six official soundtracks:

- Music from The O.C.: Mix 1
- Music from The O.C.: Mix 2
- Music from The O.C.: Mix 3 – Have a Very Merry Chrismukkah
- Music from The O.C.: Mix 4
- Music from The O.C.: Mix 5
- Music from The O.C.: Mix 6 – Covering Our Tracks

Patsavas, who was involved in selecting tracks the mixes, described the CDs as "not only a stand-alone piece but also as a companion to the show." Tammy La Gorce of Amazon.com described Mix 1 as having "moments of subtle exceptionality until the end, when things get really good", Mix 2 as a "collection that would slip effortlessly into any hipster's car CD player for its left of the dial leanings", and Mix 3 as being a "modern, cynical, but likeably wide-eyed antidote to the heap of jingle-bell-heavy offerings" Mario Cuellar from The Eastener also commented that Mix 2 has "music for everyone" Chris Carle of IGN commented that Mix 4 is "shorter than the rest, which is a little disappointing, but almost all of the tracks deliver". Elisabeth Vincentelli of Amazon.com commented that Mix 5's tracks "aren't innovative, but they are remarkably easy to like--even love" Pitchfork Media described Mix 6 as a "collection of 12 covers, performed by B- and C-list artists" but Allmusic said that the "concept [of a cover album] could have resulted in a lot of cookie-cutter, indie rock karaoke, but most of these covers are creative, and occasionally, they're inspired".

=== Charts ===
Album	Chart	Peak position
Mix 1	U.S. Billboard 200	52
Mix 1	U.S. Billboard Top Soundtracks	2
Mix 2	U.S. Billboard 200	90
Mix 2	U.S. Billboard Top Soundtracks	3
Mix 3	U.S. Billboard Top Soundtracks	25
Mix 5	U.S. Billboard 200	108
Mix 5	U.S. Billboard Top Soundtracks	3
Mix 6	U.S. Billboard Top Soundtracks	19

=== Certifications ===
Region	Certification	Certified units/sales
Australia (ARIA)	Gold	35,000^{^}
^{^} Shipments figures based on certification alone.

== List of songs featured on The O.C. ==
Song featured on Music From The O.C.: Mix 1
Song featured on Music From The O.C.: Mix 2
Song featured on Music From The O.C.: Mix 3 – Have a Very Merry Chrismukkah
Song featured on Music From The O.C.: Mix 4
Song featured on Music From The O.C.: Mix 5
Song featured on Music From The O.C.: Mix 6 – Covering Our Tracks

Artist	Song	Soundtrack	Episode(s)	Notes
The 88	"Hard to Be You"	—	3.09	
The 88	"Hide Another Mistake"	—	3.01	
The 88	"How Good Can It Be"	Mix 1	1.09, 1.22	
A.C. Newman	"On the Table"	Mix 4	2.03	
Air	"La Femme D'argent"	—	1.08	
Air	"Universal Traveler"	—	2.13	
Alan Paul	"Adios"	—	2.21	
The Album Leaf	"Another Day"	—	2.12	
The Album Leaf	"Eastern Glow"	Mix 2	2.01	
The Album Leaf	"On Your Way"	—	2.04	
The Album Leaf	"The Outer Banks"	—	2.12	
The Album Leaf	"TwentyTwoFourteen"	—	2.22, 2.24	
The Album Leaf	"Streamside"	—	2.12	
Alexi Murdoch	"All My Days"	—	4.03	
Alexi Murdoch	"Orange Sky"	Mix 1	1.11, 1.27	
Alkaline Trio	"We've Had Enough"	—	1.14	
The All-American Rejects	"Swing, Swing"	—	1.01	
All Sad Girls are Beautiful	"Baby Blue" (Badfinger cover)	—	3.03	
Ambulance LTD	"Primitive (The Way I Treat You)"	—	2.04	
Anna & Summer	"Thank You for Being a Friend"	—	1.15	
The Androids	"Do It with Madonna"	—	1.02	
APM	"Back To Ours"	—	3.12	
APM	"Dreidel Dreidel Dreidel"	—	3.10	
APM	"Here Comes the Bride"	—	1.27	
APM	"God Rest Ye Merry Gentlemen"	—	3.10	
APM	"Silent Night"	—	3.10	
April March	"Garcon Glacon"	—	4.11	
Aqualung	"Gentle"	—	1.23	
Aqualung	"Strange and Beautiful (I'll Put a Spell on You)"	—	1.10	
Aqualung	"Take Me Home"	—	1.23	
Aqueduct	"Hardcore Days & Softcore Nights"	Mix 4	2.09	
Arkarna	"House on Fire"	—	2.20	
Army Navy	"Snakes of Hawaii"	—	2.16	
Arthur Yoria	"Call Me"	—	2.17	
Ash	"Burn Baby Burn"	—	1.15	
Ashtar Command	"Into Dust" (Mazzy Star cover)	Mix 6	4.07	
Athlete	"Tourist"	—	2.12	
Audible	"Sound Makes a Circle"	—	2.20	
Azure Ray	"New Resolution"	—	1.18	
Band of Horses	"The End's Not Near" (The New Year cover)	Mix 6	4.02	
Banda Jerez	"La Chirriona"	—	4.02	
Bang Gang	"Follow"	—	2.12	
B.A.S.K.O.	"Ain't No Game"	—	3.04	
Beastie Boys	"Ch-Check It Out"	—	1.26	
Beat Phreaks	"Mi Casa"	—	2.19	
Bebel Gilberto	"Winter"	—	3.12	
Beck	"E-Pro"	—	2.15	
Beck	"Girl"	—	2.15	
Beck	"Missing"	—	2.15	
Beck	"Qué Onda Guero"	—	2.15	
Beck	"Scarecrow"	Mix 4	2.15	
Beck	"True Love Will Find You in the End" (Daniel Johnston cover)	—	2.15	
Belle & Sebastian	"If She Wants Me"	—	1.12	
Belle & Sebastian	"Song for Sunshine"	—	4.01	
Bell X1	"Eve, the Apple of My Eye"	Mix 4	2.12	
Bell X1	"In Every Sunflower"	—	2.14	
Ben Gidsoy	"Need Music"	—	4.05	
Ben Harper	"Waiting For You"	—	3.21	
Ben Kweller	"Rock of Ages"	Mix 3	—	
The Beta Band	"Assessment"	—	2.03	
Bettie Serveert	"Lover I Don't Have to Love" (Bright Eyes cover)	—	3.18	
Beulah	"Popular Mechanics for Lovers"	Mix 2	1.15	
Billy Squier	"The Stroke"	—	3.09	
The Black Eyed Peas	"Hands Up"	—	1.01	
The Black Eyed Peas	"Let's Get It Started"	—	1.05	
Black Flag	"Wasted"	—	3.14	
The Black Keys	"10 A.M. Automatic"	—	2.10	
Black Rebel Motorcycle Club	"Open Invitation"	—	3.08	
Black Rebel Motorcycle Club	"Salvation"	—	3.03	
Black Rebel Motorcycle Club	"Shuffle Your Feet"	—	3.12	
Black Rebel Motorcycle Club	"Weight of the World"	—	3.05	
Blind Melon	"No Rain"	—	2.14	
Blue Foundation	"Get Down"	—	2.07	
Blue Foundation	"Save this Town"	—	2.07	
Bloc Party	"Banquet"	—	2.18	
Bloc Party	"Blue Light" (Engineers Anti-Gravity Mix)	—	3.01	
Bloc Party	"I Still Remember"	—	4.14	
Bloc Party	"Kreuzberg"	—	4.15	
Bloc Party	"Positive Tension"	—	2.20	
Bloc Party	"Pioneers"	—	3.24	
The Blood Arm	"Stay Put"	—	4.06	
Bob Mould	"Circles"	—	3.04	
Bob Seger	"Night Moves"	—	1.19, 1.24	
Boom Bip feat. Nina Nastasia	"The Matter (of Our Discussion)"	—	3.16	
Boyz II Men	"End of the Road"	—	2.14	
Brandtson	"Earthquakes & Sharks"	—	3.23	
Bratsound	"One Day"	—	3.23	
Brassy	"Play Some D"	—	1.04	
The Bravery	"An Honest Mistake"	—	2.24	
Brendan Benson	"What I'm Looking For"	—	2.16	
The Briefs	"Getting Hit On At The Bank"	—	3.23	
Bright Eyes	"Blue Christmas"	—	1.13	
Bromheads Jacket	"What If's And Maybe's"	—	3.18	
Brooke	"I Wanna Be Happy"	—	1.03	
Brookeville	"Walking on Moonlight"	—	1.14	
Brothers and Sisters	"Without You"	—	4.05	
Butch Walker	"Hot Girls In Good Moods"	—	4.06	
Buva	"Should I Know"	—	1.15	
Calla	"Swagger"	—	3.06	
Camera Obscura	"Keep It Clean"	—	1.25	
Car 188	"Bridal March"	—	1.27	
Carmen Rizzo (featuring Kate Havnevik)	"Travel In Time"	—	3.07	
Casiotone for the Painfully Alone	"Young Shields"	—	3.19	
Catherine Feeny	"Mr. Blue"	—	4.01	
Chad VanGaalen	"Gubbbish"	—	4.05	
Cham Pain	"Get Down"	—	2.21	
Cham Pain	"Show Me"	—	1.01	
CHAP 200	"Silent Night"	—	2.06	
Charlotte Gainsbourg	"Tel Que Tu Es"	—	4.11	
Chelo	"Voodoo"	—	4.04	
The Chemical Brothers	"Leave Home"	—	4.12	
The Chemical Brothers	"Marvo Ging"	—	2.18	
The Chemical Brothers	"Out of Control"	—	1.07	
Chingy	"Dem Jeans"	—	4.04	
Chris Holmes	"China"	—	3.20	
Chris Holmes	"I Don't Care What My Friends Say"	—	3.25	
Chris Murray	"Heartache"	—	1.23	
Christina Lux	"All the Kings Horses"	—	1.24	
The Church	"Under the Milky Way"	—	2.19	
Citizens Here & One Broad	"Appearances"	—	3.05	
Clearlake	"Good Clean Fun" (nobody remix)	—	4.06	
Client	"Come On"	—	3.09	
Clinic	"Come Into Our Room"	—	1.17	
Clinic	"The New Seeker"	—	4.16	
Cobra Verde	"Get the Party Started" (Pink cover)	—	3.02	
Cobra Verde	"Waiting for a Girl Like You" (Foreigner cover)	—	3.17	
Coconut Records	"West Coast"	—	4.10	
Coldplay	"Fix You"	—	2.23	
Commuter	"Chapters"	—	3.25	
Cooler Kids	"All Around the World"	—	1.01	
Crash My Model Car	"In Dreams"	—	3.17	
The Cribs	"Hey Scenesters!"	—	2.22	
The Crystal Method	"Born Too Slow"	—	1.22	
Daft Punk	"Technologic"	—	2.19	
Damien Jurado	"What Were the Chances"	—	4.14	
Damien Rice	"Cannonball"	—	1.17	
The Dandy Warhols	"Holding Me Up"	—	3.05	
The Dandy Warhols	"We Used to Be Friends"	Mix 1	1.12	
The Dandy Warhols	"(You Come In) Burned"	—	1.13	
Darren Hayes	"In Your Eyes (Peter Gabriel cover)"	—	1.02	
David Poe	"Doxology"	—	3.10	
The Dead 60s	"You're Not the Law"	—	2.24	
Death Cab for Cutie	"A Lack of Color"	Mix 2	1.21	
Death Cab for Cutie	"A Movie Script Ending"	—	1.07, 2.20	
Death Cab for Cutie	"Soul Meets Body"	—	3.02	
Death Cab for Cutie	"The Sound of Settling"	—	2.20	
Death Cab for Cutie	"Title and Registration"	—	2.20	
The Delgados	"Everybody Come Down"	—	2.11	
Descemer	"Pa' Arriba"	—	4.02	
Diefenbach	"Favourite Friend"	—	3.13	
Digby Jones	"Under the Sea"	—	3.16, 4.05, 4.06	
Dionne Warwick and Friends	"That's What Friends Are For"	—	3.10	
Dios Malos	"Everyday"	—	3.08	
Dios Malos	"You Got Me All Wrong"	Mix 2	2.01	
Dirty Pretty Things	"Deadwood"	—	4.06	
Dirty Vegas	"Closer"	—	2.05	
Dogzilla	"Dogzilla"	—	4.08	
Dopo Yume	"The Secret Show"	—	3.20	
Doves	"Caught by the River"	Mix 1	1.02	
Dropkick Murphys	"Walk Away"	—	1.14	
Eagles of Death Metal	"Flames Go Higher"	—	3.24	
Eagles of Death Metal	"I Only Want You"	—	2.17	
Earlimart	"We Drink on the Job"	—	1.11	
Eartha Kitt	"Santa Baby"	—	1.13	
Editors	"Orange Crush" (R.E.M. cover)	—	4.04	
Eberg	"Inside Your Head"	—	4.06	
Eels	"Christmas is Going to the Dogs"	Mix 3	2.06	
Eels	"Love of the Loveless"	—	1.18	
Eels	"Saturday Morning"	Mix 2	1.15	
Efterklang	"Step Aside"	—	2.21	
Electrelane	"On Parade"	—	1.26	
Electric President	"Insomnia"	—	3.13	
Electric President	"Grand Machine #12"	—	3.15	
Elefant	"Ester"	—	2.02	
Elliott Smith	"Pretty (Ugly Before)"	—	2.10	
Elliott Smith	"Twilight"	—	2.07	
Elvis Perkins	"While You Were Sleeping"	—	4.05	
Embrace	"I Can't Come Down"	—	3.23	
Enrique Iglesias	"Addicted"	—	1.16	
Evermore	"It's Too Late"	Mix 2 (Note: "It's Too Late" was only featured on the Australian release of the album.)	—	
The Explorers Club	"Forever"	—	4.09	
The Faders	"Disco Church"	—	1.06	
The Faint	"Desperate Guys"	—	2.05	
Feeder	"Frequency"	—	2.16	
Feist	"Let It Die"	—	2.05	
Fine China	"My Worst Nightmare"	—	3.09	
Finley Quaye & William Orbit	"Dice"	Mix 1	1.14	
The Fire Theft	"Summer Time"	—	1.19	
Firstcom	"Hannukah Lights"	—	1.13	
Firstcom	"Silent Night"	—	1.13, 3.10	
Firstcom	"Silent Night On The Prairie"	—	3.10	
Firstcom	"We Wish You a Merry Christmas"	—	1.13	
The Flaming Sideburns	"Flowers"	—	1.14	
Flunk	"Play"	Mix 4	2.09, 2.18	
Fountains of Wayne	"All Kinds of Time"	—	1.05	
Francine	"Albany Brownout"	—	3.11	
Frank Chacksfield	"Theme From Picnic (Moonglow)"	—	4.13	
Franz Ferdinand	"Do You Want To"	—	3.02	
Franz Ferdinand	"Jacqueline"	—	1.26	
Frausdots	"Soft Light"	—	2.05	
Fredo Viola	"The Sad Song"	—	4.14, 4.15	
The Funky Lowlives	"Sail Into the Sun"	—	3.12	
The Futureheads	"Decent Days and Nights"	Mix 4	2.19	
The Futureheads	"Meantime"	—	2.16	
Gang of Four	"I Love a Man in Uniform"	—	3.11	
The Go Find	"Summer Quest"	—	2.11	
George Jones	"A Picture of Me (Without You)"	—	3.21	
Get Cape. Wear Cape. Fly	"I Spy"	—	4.10	
Get Cape. Wear Cape. Fly	"Once More With Feeling"	—	4.03	
Giuseppe Verdi	"Questa o Quella"	—	2.21	
Goldspot	"Time Bomb"	—	3.12	
Goldspot	"Float On" (Modest Mouse cover)	Mix 6	4.05	
Gomez	"Silence"	—	2.04	
Gordon Jenkins	"Caravan"	—	1.11	
Gorillaz	"El Mañana"	—	2.24	
Gorillaz	"Kids With Guns"	Mix 5	2.21	
Grade 8	"Brick by Brick"	—	1.05	
The Grand Skeem	"Eya Eya Oy"	—	1.03	
The Grand Skeem	"Rock Like This"	—	1.03	
The Grand Skeem	"Sucka MCs"	—	1.03	
Guster	"Brand New Delhi"	—	2.06	
Guster	"Carol of the Meows"	—	2.06	
Guster	"I Love A Man In Uniform"	—	2.06	
Guster	"I Only Have Eyes For You"	—	2.06	
Guster	"Keep it Together"	—	1.08	
Guster	"Mamacita, Donde Esta Santa Claus"	—	2.06	
Guster	"My Favourite Friend"	—	2.06	
Guster	"Our House"	—	2.06	
Guster	"Shuffle Your Feet"	—	2.06	
Gwen Stefani	"Cool"	—	2.05	
Halloween, Alaska	"All the Arms Around You"	—	2.01	
Halloween, Alaska	"Des Moines"	—	1.20	
Har Mar Superstar	"As (Seasons)"	—	2.06	
Hard-Fi	"Gotta Reason"	—	3.23	
Havergal	"New Innocent Tyro Allegory"	—	2.17	
Henry Mancini	"Loose Caboose"	—	1.24	
Henry Mancini	"Something for Cat"	—	4.08	
Highwater Rising	"Pillows and Records"	—	1.24	
Home Video	"Superluminal"	—	2.20	
Hot Chip	"And I Was a Boy from School"	—	4.12	
Hot Hot Heat	"Christmas Day in the Sun"	—	3.10	
Howling Bells	"Low Happening"	—	3.13	
DJ Harry	"All My Life"	—	3.12	
Hyper	"Antmusic"	—	2.23	
I Am Jen	"Broken in All the Right Places"	—	4.14	
I Am Kloot	"3 Feet Tall"	—	1.18	
Ian Broudie	"Song for No One"	—	3.01	
Imogen Heap	"Goodnight & Go"	Mix 4	2.05	
Imogen Heap	"Hide and Seek"	Mix 5	2.24	
Imogen Heap	"Hallelujah" (Leonard Cohen cover)	—	3.25	
Imogen Heap	"Speeding Cars"	—	3.25	
Infusion	"Girls Can Be Cruel"	—	2.09	
Infusion	"Natural"	—	3.04	
Interpol	"Evil"	—	2.10	
Interpol	"Specialist"	Mix 2	1.21	
The Invisible Men	"Make It Bounce"	—	3.09	
Iron & Wine	"The Sea and the Rhythm"	—	1.27	
Jacob Golden	"On a Saturday"	—	4.16	
James Blunt	"Fall At Your Feet" (Crowded House cover)	—	3.14	
James Horner	"Sing, Sing, Sing, (With a Swing)"	—	1.03	
James William Hindle	"Leaving Trains"	—	1.20	
The Jayhawks	"Save It for a Rainy Day"	—	2.14	
Jazzelicious	"Cali4nia"	—	2.09	
Jazzelicious	"Sambossa"	—	2.12	
J. Belle	"No Idea"	—	2.12	
Jem	"Flying High"	—	1.27	
Jem	"Just a Ride"	Mix 1	1.14, 1.23	
Jem	"Maybe I'm Amazed" (Paul McCartney cover)	Mix 2	1.27	
Jet	"Get What You Need"	—	1.12	
Jet	"Move On"	Mix 1	1.12	
Jet	"Shine On"	—	4.16	
Jet	"Put Your Money Where Your Mouth Is"	—	4.06	
Jimmy Eat World	"Last Christmas" (Wham! cover)	Mix 3	—	
Joel Evans & Friends	"No Easy Way To Say Goodbye"	—	2.14	
The John Buzon Trio	"Caravan"	—	1.11	
John Digweed	"Warung Beach"	—	4.08	
John Paul White	"Can't Get it Out of My Head" (ELO cover)	Mix 6	—	
Johnathan Rice	"So Sweet"	Mix 2	1.26	
Jonathan Boyle	"Samba Sandwich"	—	3.22	
José González	"Stay In The Shade"	—	3.13	
José González	"Crosses"	—	2.24	
Joseph Arthur	"Honey and the Moon"	Mix 1	1.01	
Joseph Arthur	"A Smile That Explodes"	—	2.16	
Journey	"Open Arms"	—	2.08	
Journey	"Separate Ways (Worlds Apart)"	—	1.21	
Joy Zipper	"Baby, You Should Know"	—	2.08	
Juana Molina	"Tres Cosas"	—	2.20	
Jude	"Out of L.A."	—	1.22	
Jude	"Save Me"	—	4.01	
Justin Catalino	"Beat Up Blue (Lucid Version)"	—	2.17	
Kaiser Chiefs	"Saturday Night"	—	2.17	
Kaiser Chiefs	"Na Na Na Na Naa"	Mix 5	2.21	
Kasabian	"Reason is Treason"	Mix 5	2.17	
K-Dub	"Get Krunk"	—	1.22	
Keane	"Walnut Tree"	Mix 2	2.02	
Keane	"A Bad Dream"	—	4.01	
Kelis	"Bossy"	—	3.25	
The K.G.B.	"I'm a Player"	—	1.01	
Kid Gloves	"Espionage"	—	1.22	
The Killers	"Everything Will Be Alright"	—	2.04	
The Killers	"Mr. Brightside"	—	2.04	
The Killers	"Smile Like You Mean It"	Mix 2	2.04	
The Kingdom Flying Club	"Artists are Boring"	—	2.17	
Kings of Convenience	"Misread"	—	2.13	
The Kooks	"Ooh La"	—	3.17	
The Koreans	"How Does It Feel"	—	2.20	
La Rocca	"If You Need the Morning"	—	3.16	
La Rocca	"Some You Give Away"	—	3.24	
Lady Sovereign	"Pretty Vacant" (Sex Pistols cover)	Mix 6	—	
Lady Sovereign	"Love Me or Hate Me"	—	4.04	
Lady Sovereign	"Random"	—	3.23	
Ladytron	"Sugar"	—	3.06	
Lali Puna	"Faking the Books"	—	2.13	
Laptop	"Ratso Rizzo"	—	1.14	
Laptop	"Want In"	—	1.15	
LCD Soundsystem	"Daft Punk Is Playing at My House"	Mix 5	2.19	
LCD Soundsystem	"Too Much Love"	—	2.17	
Leaves	"Breathe"	—	1.10	
Leona Naess	"Christmas"	Mix 3	2.06	
Leona Naess	"Lazy Days"	—	1.04	
Leonard Cohen	"Hallelujah"	—	1.02, 1.27	
Le Tigre	"TKO"	—	2.15	
Living Things	"Bom Bom Bom"	—	3.16	
Liz Phair	"Why Can't I?"	—	1.04	
Lockdown Project	"Can You Feel It?"	—	4.02	
The Long Winters	"Christmas With You Is Best"	Mix 3	—	
The Long Winters	"The Commander Thinks Aloud"	—	4.09	
The Long Winters	"Fire Island, AK"	—	4.02	
Los Cubaztecas	"La Conga De Santiago"	—	1.07	
Los Cubaztecas	"Ritmo De Oro"	—	1.07	
Lou Barlow	"Legendary"	—	2.18	
Louis XIV	"God Killed the Queen"	—	2.14	
Love As Laughter	"Dirty Lives"	—	2.23	
Love of Diagrams	"No Way Out"	—	3.08	
Low	"Just Like Christmas"	Mix 3	—	
The Low Standards	"Du Temps"	—	4.11	
The Low Standards	"Every Little Thing"	—	4.10	
Luce	"Good Day"	—	1.07	
Luther Russell	"When You're Gone"	—	3.19	
The M's	"Come Into Our Room" (Clinic cover)	Mix 6	—	
The M's	"Plan Of The Man"	—	3.01, 3.17	
Magnet	"Dancing in the Moonlight"	—	3.11	
Magnet feat. Gemma Hayes	"Lay Lady Lay" (Bob Dylan cover)	—	2.05	
Manishevitz	"Beretta"	—	3.01	
Manu Chao	"Lágrimas De Oro"	—	4.02	
Marc Durst Trio	"Night Groove"	—	2.21	
Mark Lanegan Band	"Strange Religion"	—	2.09	
Mark Vieha	"Way To Go"	—	3.01	
Martina Topley Bird	"I Only Have Eyes For You"	—	3.13	
Martina Topley Bird	"Soulfood" (Charles Webster's Banging House Dub)	—	2.07	
Martin Denny	"Love Dance"	—	1.16	
Martin Denny	"Quiet Village"	—	1.16	
Mascott	"Turn Off/Turn On"	—	2.05	
Mastersource	"Dreamtime"	—	1.19	
Mastersource	"Watching the Game at Joes"	—	1.18	
Mastersource	"Something For You"	—	1.21	
Mastersource	"Walkin' the Walk"	—	1.21	
Mates of State	"California" (Phantom Planet cover)	Mix 6	4.07	
Matt Pond PA	"Champagne Supernova" (Oasis cover)	Mix 4	2.14	
Matt Pond PA	"In the Aeroplane Over the Sea" (Neutral Milk Hotel cover)	—	3.03	
Matt Pond PA	"New Hampshire"	—	2.08	
Maximum Roach	"Let it Roll"	—	1.01	
Mazzy Star	"Into Dust"	—	1.01, 1.07	
M. Craft	"Love Knows How to Fight"	—	3.14	
M. Craft	"Somewhere in Between"	—	4.09	
M. Craft	"Sweets"	—	2.11	
Mellowman Ace	"Latinos Mundial"	—	1.11	
M.I.A.	"Fire Fire"	—	3.04	
The Midway State	"Unaware"	—	4.13	
Minibar	"Breathe Easy"	—	1.11	
Mocean Worker	"Right Now"	—	1.25	
Modest Mouse	"Float On"	—	1.23	
Modest Mouse	"Paper Thin Walls"	—	2.07	
Modest Mouse	"The View"	Mix 4	2.07	
Modest Mouse	"The World at Large"	—	2.07	
Mojave 3	"Bill Oddity"	—	1.19	
Mojave 3	"Bluebird of Happiness"	—	1.20	
Mojave 3	"Breaking the Ice"	—	3.25	
Mosquitos	"Boombox"	—	1.17	
Mosquitos	"Domesticada"	—	2.04	
Ms. John Soda	"Hands"	—	3.22	
My Pet Genius	"Rae"	—	2.23	
The Murmurs	"Big Talker"	—	2.15	
Nada Surf	"If You Leave" (Orchestral Manoeuvres in the Dark cover)	Mix 2	1.21	
The National Trust	"It's Just Cruel"	—	3.18	
The New Amsterdams	"The Spoils of the Spoiled"	—	1.17	
The New Pornographers	"The New Face Of Zero And One"	—	2.04	
The New Year	"The End's Not Near"	—	2.02	
Nikka Costa	"On and On"	—	3.09	
Nine Black Alps	"Unsatisfied"	—	3.08	
The Obscurities	"Stop Dragging Me Down"	—	2.19	
Oceansize	"Meredith"	—	3.19	
Of Montreal	"Requiem for O.M.M."	Mix 5	—	
Of Montreal	"Gronlandic Edit"	—	4.12	
Of Montreal	"Party's Crashing Us"	—	2.19, 2.22	
Ohio Players	"Fire"	—	1.26	
OK Go	"You're So Damn Hot"	—	1.06	
Olympic Hopefuls	"Let's Go!"	—	2.07	
Orange	"No Rest for the Weekend"	—	3.06	
Orenda Fink	"Blind Asylum"	—	3.05	
Orquestra Del Plata	"Montserrat"	—	1.27	
Pajo	"High Lonesome Moan"	—	4.12	
Palm Street	"Break"	—	1.06	
Pansy Division	"At the Mall"	—	2.15	
Paris, Texas	"Like You Like an Arsonist"	—	2.17	
Patrick Park	"Life's a Song"	—	4.16	
Patrick Park	"Something Pretty"	Mix 2	1.20	
The Pattern	"Selling Submarines"	—	1.14	
Paul Oakenfold feat. Brittany Murphy	"Faster Kill Pussycat"	—	3.19	
Paul Westerberg	"Let the Bad Times Roll"	—	1.08	
Peggy Lee	"Winter Wonderland"	—	1.13	
Pennywise	"Knocked Down"	—	3.06	
The Perishers	"Nothing Like You and I"	—	2.23	
The Perishers	"Trouble Sleeping"	Mix 2	2.02	
The Perishers	"Weekends"	—	2.03	
PET	"No Yes No"	—	2.03	
Petra Haden & Bill Frisell	"Yellow" (Coldplay cover)	—	3.08	
Phantom Planet	"California"	Mix 1	1.01	
Phantom Planet	"California 2005"	Mix 5	3.02	
Phantom Planet	"Our House" (Crosby, Stills, Nash & Young cover)	—	3.11	
Phoenix	"Love For Granted"	—	2.23	
Phoenix	"Run Run Run"	—	2.05	
Phontaine	"Sour Milk"	—	3.12	
Pinback	"AFK"	—	2.16	
Pinback	"Fortress"	Mix 4	2.04	
Pinback	"Non-Photo Blue"	—	2.12	
Pinback	"Wasted" (Black Flag cover)	Mix 6	—	
Pixies	"Debaser"	—	2.16	
Placebo	"Running Up that Hill" (Kate Bush cover)	—	4.01	
Plastilina Mosh	"Quiero Mi Pastilla"	—	4.02	
The Plus Ones	"All the Boys"	—	1.22	
The Pogues	"Love You 'Till The End"	—	4.04	
Poison	"Every Rose Has Its Thorn"	—	2.19	
Poster Children	"Western Springs"	—	2.10	
The Presets	"Girl and the Sea"	—	3.18	
Preston School of Industry	"Caught in the Rain"	—	1.20	
The Prodigy	"Hot Ride"	—	2.24	
Psapp	"Rear Moth"	—	2.12	
Puddle of Mudd	"Away from Me"	—	1.16	
R.E.M.	"Talk About the Passion"	—	4.13	
Rachael Yamagata	"Reason Why"	—	2.11	
Rachael Yamagata	"Worn Me Down"	—	2.03	
Radio 4	"Start a Fire"	—	1.22	
Radiohead	"Fog (Again)"	—	3.20	
Radiohead	"Like Spinning Plates"	—	4.15	
The Rakes	"Retreat"	—	3.12	
Ranchera All Stars	"De Un Mundo Raro"	—	4.04	
Ranchera All Stars	"Ella"	—	4.04	
Ranchera All Stars	"Pa Todo El Ano"	—	4.04	
Ranchera All Stars	"Siempre Hace Frio"	—	4.04	
Ranchera All Stars	"Tu Solo"	—	4.04	
The Raveonettes	"The Christmas Song"	Mix 3	3.10	
The Reindeer Section	"Cartwheels"	Mix 4	2.11	
Richard Hayman and his Orchestra	"Autumn Leaves"	—	1.24	
Rilo Kiley	"Portions for Foxes"	—	2.10	
Ringside	"Strangerman"	—	2.10	
Rithma	"Opium Dreams"	—	3.07	
Rob Zombie	"Foxy Foxy"	—	3.21	
Robbers on High Street	"Love Underground"	—	2.21	
Rock Kills Kid	"Hide Away"	—	3.14	
Rock Kills Kid	"I Turn My Camera On" (Spoon cover)	Mix 6	4.15	
Rockers Hi Fi	"Going Under"	—	1.07	
Rocky Votolato	"White Daisy Passing"	—	3.15	
The Rogers Sisters	"Freight Elevator"	—	2.22	
Rogue Wave	"California"	—	3.11	
Rogue Wave	"Debaser" (Pixies cover)	Mix 6	4.14	
Rogue Wave	"Interruptions"	—	3.07	
Rogue Wave	"Publish My Love"	Mix 5	3.06	
Ron Sexsmith	"Maybe this Christmas"	Mix 3	1.13, 2.06	
Rooney	"Blueside"	—	1.15	
Rooney	"I'm a Terrible Person"	—	1.02	
Rooney	"I'm Shakin'"	—	1.15	
Rooney	"Merry Xmas Everybody" (Slade cover)	Mix 3	—	
Rooney	"Popstars"	—	1.15	
Rooney	"Sorry Sorry"	—	1.15	
The Roots	"Rolling with Heat" (feat. Talib Kweli)	—	1.05	
Röyksopp	"Triumphant"	—	3.04	
Rufus Wainwright	"California"	—	1.02	
The Runaways	"Cherry Bomb"	—	3.24	
The Runaways	"Wait for Me"	—	1.06	
Ryan Adams and The Cardinals	"Friends"	—	2.24	
Ryan Adams	"Wonderwall" (Oasis cover)	—	1.19	
Ryan Adams	"Nightbirds"	—	3.22	
Sam Prekop	"C + F"	—	2.15	
Sam Roberts	"The Bootleg Saint"	—	4.01	
Sam Roberts	"No Sleep"	—	2.13	
Sandy Cohen	"Don't Give Up On Me"	—	2.08	
Sandy Cohen	"She's No Lady, She's My Wife"	—	2.08	
Scissors For Lefty	"Next to Argyle"	—	3.18	
Scorpions	"Rock You Like a Hurricane"	—	2.16	
Scotland Yard Gospel Choir	"That's All I Need"	—	3.20	
Shady Lady	"We're Going Out Tonight"	—	1.02	
Si Zentner	"Desafinado"	—	4.08	
Sia	"The Bully"	—	2.11	
Sia	"Paranoid Android" (Radiohead cover)	—	4.07	
Secret Machines	"Road Leads Where It's Led"	—	1.22	
Senza	"Cava Del Rio"	—	2.23, 3.14, 4.04	
She Wants Revenge	"I Don't Wanna Fall in Love"	—	3.04	
The Shins	"Turn on Me"	—	4.10	
Shout Out Louds	"But Then Again No"	—	2.22	
Shout Out Louds	"Go Sadness"	—	3.09	
Shout Out Louds	"Wish I Was Dead Pt. 2"	Mix 5	3.03	
Silversun Pickups	"Lazy Eye"	—	4.12	
Silversun Pickups	"Rusted Wheel"	—	4.15	
Singapore Sling	"Over Driver"	—	1.14	
Slightly Stoopid	"Sweet Honey"	—	1.01	
The Smashing Pumpkins	"To Sheila"	—	1.04	
Soledad Brothers	"Cage That Tiger"	—	2.22	
Solomon Burke	"Don't Give Up On Me"	—	1.09, 2.08	
Someone Still Loves You Boris Yeltsin	"Oregon Girl"	—	3.23	
Something Corporate	"Space"	—	1.07	
Soul Kid #1	"More Bounce (In California)"	—	1.06	
Soulwax	"E Talking"	—	2.20	
South	"Nine Lives"	—	1.25	
South	"Paint the Silence"	Mix 1	1.09, 3.17	
Sparklehorse	"Return To Me"	—	4.11	
Spiderbaby	"Don't Pity Me"	—	3.18	
Spoon	"Sister Jack"	—	2.18	
Spoon	"I Turn My Camera On"	—	2.21	
Spoon	"The Way We Get By"	Mix 1	1.05	
Squirrel Nut Zippers	"Anything But Love"	—	1.19	
Stacey Kent	"A Fine Romance"	—	1.10	
Stars	"The Big Fight"	—	2.22	
Stars	"The Vanishing"	—	1.26	
Stars	"Your Ex-Lover is Dead"	Mix 5	2.13	
The Stills	"The House We Live In"	—	4.12	
The Subways	"I Want to Hear What You Have Got to Say"	—	3.07	
The Subways	"Oh Yeah"	—	3.07	
The Subways	"Rock & Roll Queen"	Mix 5	3.07	
Sufjan Stevens	"Dear Mr. Supercomputer"	—	4.11	
Sufjan Stevens	"To Be Alone With You"	Mix 4	2.02	
Sufjan Stevens	"For the Widows in Paradise, for the Fatherless in Ypsilanti"	—	3.15	
Sufjan Stevens	"The Incarnation"	—	4.15	
The Suicide Machines	"Did You Ever Get a Feeling of Dread"	—	1.14	
Summer Roberts	"Wannabe"	—	4.13	
The Sunshine Underground	"I Ain't Losing Any Sleep"	—	4.10	
Sun Kil Moon	"Neverending Math Equation"	—	3.15	
Sun Kil Moon	"Tiny Cities Made Of Ashes"	—	3.21	
Sunday Runners	"Memories Left at Sea"	—	2.13	
Super Furry Animals	"Hello Sunshine"	Mix 2	1.19	
The Surge	"Spin Me Around"	—	3.19	
Survivor	"Eye of the Tiger"	—	2.21	
Syd Matters	"Hello Sunshine" (Super Furry Animals cover)	Mix 6	4.04	
Syd Matters	"To All Of You"	—	3.23	
Syntax	"Pride"	—	1.24	
Tally Hall	"Good Day"	—	3.20	
Tally Hall	"Hidden in the Sand"	—	4.11	
Tally Hall	"Smile Like You Mean It" (The Killers cover)	Mix 6	4.08	
The Talk	"N.Y.L.A."	—	3.08	
Tangerine Dream	"Love on a Real Train"	—	2.18	
The Tao Of Groove	"Brand New Delhi"	—	3.13	
Temper Temper	"Trust Me"	—	2.20	
Thom Yorke	"Black Swan"	—	4.03	
The Thrills	"Big Sur"	Mix 2	1.17	
The Thrills	"The Curse of Comfort"	—	2.09	
The Thrills	"Faded Beauty Queens"	—	2.03	
The Thrills	"Not For All the Love in the World"	—	2.09	
The Thrills	"Saturday Night"	—	2.09	
T.I.	"Bring 'Em Out"	—	2.21	
Tiger Lou	"Warmth"	—	2.10	
Timo Maas	"To Get Down"	—	1.22	
Tom Jones	"It's Not Unusual"	—	1.16	
Tom Petty and the Heartbreakers	"Christmas All Over Again"	—	3.10	
Tom Quick	"Butterfly"	—	4.05	
Tom Quick	"Honey Dew"	—	2.09	
Tom Vek	"I Ain't Sayin' My Goodbyes"	—	3.16	
Tom Vek	"C-C (You Set The Fire In Me)"	—	3.16	
Transplants	"Gangsters and Thugs"	—	3.03	
Trent Dabbs	"The Love Goes"	—	2.04, 2.12	
Trespassers William	"Alone"	—	1.21	
Trespassers William	"Different Stars"	—	1.11	
Tricky	"Hollow"	—	1.06	
Tricky	"How High"	—	1.26	
True Love	"The Crime"	—	3.20	
Tunng	"It's Because... We've Got Hair"	—	4.09	
Tunng	"Pioneers" (Bloc Party cover)	—	3.24	
Turin Brakes	"Rain City"	Mix 1	1.03	
Turin Brakes	"Self-Help"	—	1.18	
Two Hours Traffic	"Leave Me Alone"	—	3.22	
U2	"Sometimes You Can't Make It On Your Own"	—	2.04	
Underoath	"A Boy Brushed Red...Living in Black and White"	—	3.12	
User	"Do You"	—	1.06	
The Vacation	"Make Up Your Mind"	—	1.14	
Van McCoy	"Hustle"	—	2.06	
The Ventures	"Santa Claus is Coming to Town"	—	1.13	
Victor Malloy	"A Night in Vegas"	—	3.19	
Village People	"Y.M.C.A."	—	3.10	
The Vines	"Anysound"	—	3.21	
The Vines	"Ride"	—	1.22	
The Vines	"Spaceship"	—	3.24	
Viva Voce	"Lesson No. 1"	—	2.13	
Walking Concert	"Hands Up!"	—	2.10	
The Walkmen	"Little House of Savages"	Mix 2	2.03	
The Walkmen	"What's In It For Me?"	—	2.03	
Way Out West	"Melt"	—	2.19	
We Are Scientists	"Inaction"	—	3.18	
The Western States Motel	"The New E Blues"	—	4.11	
Whitesnake	"Here I Go Again"	—	2.19	
Whitey	"Wrap It Up"	—	3.22	
Wilco	"Panther"	—	2.23	
Will Smith	"Miami"	—	2.21	
The Willowz	"Meet Your Demise"	—	1.26	
Wolfmother	"Woman"	—	3.21	
Yellowcard	"Way Away"	—	1.05	
Youth Group	"Start Today Tomorrow"	—	4.13	
Youth Group	"Daisychains"	—	4.06	
Youth Group	"Forever Young" (Alphaville cover)	Mix 5	3.04, 3.16	
Youth Group	"Shadowland"	—	2.21	
Zack Hexum	"Met a Girl Like You Once"	—	1.25	
Zero 7	"Destiny"	—	1.14	
Zero 7	"Pageant of The Bizarre"	—	4.04	
Zero 7	"Passing By"	—	1.26	
Zero 7	"Somersault"	—	2.01	
Zero 7	"Waiting to Die"	—	4.05	
