= Dice (Finley Quaye song) =

Single by Finley Quaye

from the album Much More Than Much Love
- Released: 16 March 2004
- Length: 4:15
- Label: Sony
- Songwriters: William Orbit, Finley Quaye, Beth Orton

"Dice" is a single released by Finley Quaye. It was written with Beth Orton and recorded by William Orbit.

== Composition ==
The segment of the song sung by Beth Orton is sampled from "Roll The Dice", a song which originally appeared on her 1993 debut album Superpinkymandy. The album was also produced by her then-boyfriend William Orbit.

== Single use ==
The single was used in the American Fox network TV series The OC in episode 14 of season one, entitled "The Countdown". The song was a minor hit, helped in part by its inclusion on OC's the Season 1 sound track called Music from the OC: Mix 1 (track 10). The TV series Chuck used the same song in episode 6 of season one ("Chuck vs. the Sandworm.") as a parallel to The OC episode. The song was also featured in episode 14 of season 3 ("Since You've Been Gone") in the TV Series "Everwood." It can also be found on the Ministry of Sound's Chilled 1991 - 2008.

It has also been used by BBC Scotland in their TV trailer for the TV series called 'Hebrides" 2013

== Charts ==
| Chart (2004) | Peak position |
|---|---|
| U.S. Billboard Hot Dance Singles Sales | 18 |
