= No Goodbyes =

No Goodbyes may refer to:

== Albums ==
- No Goodbyes (album), a 1977 album by Daryl Hall & John Oates

== Songs ==
- "No Goodbyes" (Sherman Brothers song)
- "No Goodbyes" (Linda song)
- "No Goodbyes" (The Subways song)
- "No Goodbyes", a 1978 single by Curtis Mayfield from the album Do It All Night
- "No Goodbyes", a 2003 song by Blue from Guilty
- "No Goodbyes", song by Dua Lipa from Dua Lipa, 2017
