= With You (The Subways song) =

Single by The Subways

from the album Young for Eternity
- Released: 12 September 2005
- Genre: Indie rock
- Label: Warner Brothers Music/City Pavement Records (UK)
- Songwriter(s): Billy Lunn, Charlotte Cooper, Josh Morgan

The Subways singles chronology
"Rock & Roll Queen" (2005)	"With You" (2005)	"No Goodbyes" (2005)

"With You" is a single by popular English rock band The Subways, from their debut album Young for Eternity. It was released on the 12 September 2005.

== Music video ==
The video for the single was shot on 7 July 2005 in London. It featured fans from the bands' online forum.

== Track listings ==
- 7"
1. "With You"
2. "Staring At The Sun"
- CDS
1. "With You"
2. "A Plain Above"
- DVD
1. "With You"
2. "Lost You To The City"
3. "Rock & Roll Queen" - Live From The Isle Of Wight [Video]
4. "With You" [Video]
5. "Making Of The Video" [Video]

== Chart performance ==
The song peaked at number 29 on the UK singles chart.
