= No Goodbyes (The Subways song) =

Single by The Subways

from the album Young for Eternity
- Released: 12 December 2005
- Genre: Alternative rock, indie rock
- Label: Warner Brothers Music/City Pavement Records(UK)
- Songwriter(s): Billy Lunn, Charlotte Cooper, Josh Morgan

The Subways singles chronology
"With You" (2005)	"No Goodbyes" (2005)	"Girls & Boys" (2008)

"No Goodbyes" is the fifth and last single by popular English rock band The Subways, from their debut album Young for Eternity. It was released on 12 December 2005.

== Track listings ==
- 7" #1
1. "No Goodbyes"
2. "You've Got To Hide Your Love Away"
- 7" #2
1. "No Goodbyes" - Chris Lord-Alge Remix
2. "Mary" - Live From The Islington Academy
- CDS
1. "No Goodbyes"
2. "Road To Nowhere"

== Chart performance ==
The song peaked at number 27 in the UK singles chart.
