= Vanguard (album) =

Studio album by Finley Quaye
- Released: 18 September 2000
- Label: Epic
- Producers: Finley Quaye, Kevin Bacon, Jonathan Quarmby

Finley Quaye chronology
Maverick a Strike (1997)	Vanguard (2000)	Much More Than Much Love (2000)

Vanguard is the second album by the British musician Finley Quaye, released on 18 September 2000. It followed a tumultuous period in Quaye's life. It is thought that Quaye received £2 million for the album, which was considered in retrospect to have been a major setback in his career after the success of Maverick a Strike.

The album peaked at No. 35 on the UK Albums Chart. Its first single was "Spiritualized", which was inspired by the birth of Quaye's third child.

== Production ==
The album was produced by Quaye, Kevin Bacon, and Jonathan Quarmby. It was recorded in London over a period of four months.

== Critical reception ==
Professional ratings
Review scores
Source	Rating
AllMusic	2.5/5 stars
Dayton Daily News	C+
Entertainment Weekly	B+
NME	4.5/5 stars
Vibe	3/5 stars

NME wrote that "there’s something about Vanguard's playful disregard for convention that recalls Captain Beefheart's Trout Mask Replica, perhaps the most infamous work within the rock field to thumb its nose at description while giving pretension the big swerve." The Austin Chronicle noted that "Quaye has not only taken the basic trappings of reggae to an entirely different place, he's also molded a thoroughly modern, transglobal sound that transcends the limitations any one genre might impose." The Independent determined that "the coherence of his Maverick a Strike debut seems to have drained away, leaving little more than a series of aimless rock'n'reggae grooves jessied-up with studio effects and sprayed with pointless verbal jetsam."

Entertainment Weekly thought that "Quaye’s thoroughly urbanized, half-mad brand of African roots music is alive, well, and wonderfully prickly." The Guardian called Vanguard "a fascinating, eclectic album that goes far beyond the promise of the debut, establishing Quaye as an unignorable 21st-century talent."

AllMusic wrote: "Envision a penny dreadful being sung aloud inside a pub while Roni Size tries to squeeze drunken gospeltronica out of his sequencer banks."

== Track listing ==
All tracks are written by Finley Quaye, except where noted.

No.	Title	Writer(s)	Length
1.	"Broadcast"		2:55
2.	"Spiritualized"		3:36
3.	"The Emperor"	Quaye, Adhi Propfh, Jonathan Quarmby, Kevin Bacon	3:27
4.	"Burning"		2:45
5.	"Everybody Knows"	Quaye, Pablo Gad	4:06
6.	"Feeling Blue"		4:23
7.	"When I Burn Off in the Distance"		2:53
8.	"Chad Valley"		3:25
9.	"Calendar"		2:59
10.	"British Air Rage"	Quaye, Winston Lewis	3:03
11.	"White Paper"		4:38
12.	"Hey Now"		4:17

== Charts ==
Chart performance for Vanguard
Chart (2000)	Peak position
Australian Albums (ARIA)	132
French Albums (SNEP)	44
UK Albums (Official Charts)	35
