= Maverick a Strike =

Studio album by Finley Quaye
- Released: 6 August 1997
- Length: 51:42
- Labels: Epic; 550
- Producers: Finley Quaye; Kevin Bacon

Finley Quaye chronology
Maverick a Strike (1997)	Vanguard (2000)

Singles from Maverick a Strike
- 1. "Sunday Shining" Released: 1997; 2. "Even After All" Released: 1997; 3. "It's Great When We're Together" Released: 1997; 4. "Your Love Gets Sweeter" Released: 1998; 5. "Ultra Stimulation" Released: 1998

Professional ratings
Review scores
Source	Rating
AllMusic	3/5 stars
Entertainment Weekly	B+
The Guardian	5/5 stars
NME	5/10
Pitchfork	9.4/10
Q	4/5 stars
Rolling Stone	4/5 stars
Select	4/5

Maverick a Strike is the debut studio album by Scottish musician Finley Quaye. It was released on 6 August 1997 through 550 Music and Epic Records. The album spawned five singles: "Sunday Shining", "Even After All", "It's Great When We're Together", "Your Love Gets Sweeter", and "Ultra Stimulation", all of which charted on the UK Singles Chart. The album peaked at number three on the UK Albums Chart. The album has been certified double platinum by the British Phonographic Industry.

== Track listing ==
All tracks written by Finley Quaye, except where noted.

No.	Title	Writer(s)	Length
1.	"Ultra Stimulation"		3:52
2.	"It's Great When We're Together"		3:39
3.	"Sunday Shining"	Quaye; Bob Marley	3:42
4.	"Even After All"		3:54
5.	"Ride On and Turn the People On"		3:47
6.	"The Way of the Explosive"		4:44
7.	"Your Love Gets Sweeter"		3:12
8.	"Supreme I Preme"		4:59
9.	"Sweet and Loving Man"		3:21
10.	"Red Rolled and Seen"		4:07
11.	"Falling"	Quaye; Adhi Propfh	3:16
12.	"I Need a Lover"		4:04
13.	"Maverick a Strike"		4:59
Total length:			51:42

== Personnel ==
Credits adapted from album's liner notes.

- Finley Quaye – vocals, producer
- Kevin Bacon – co-producer
- Jonathan Quarmby - co-producer

== Charts ==
=== Weekly charts ===
Weekly chart performance for Maverick a Strike
Chart (1997)	Peak position
Australian Albums (ARIA)	77
Canada Top Albums/CDs (RPM)	67
Dutch Albums (Album Top 100)	46
French Albums (SNEP)	38
New Zealand Albums (RMNZ)	11
UK Albums (Official Charts)	3
US Heatseekers Albums (Billboard)	47

=== Year-end charts ===
1997 year-end chart performance for Maverick a Strike
Chart (1997)	Position
UK Albums (OCC)	54

1998 year-end chart performance for Maverick a Strike
Chart (1998)	Position
New Zealand Albums (RMNZ)	47
UK Albums (OCC)	39

== Certifications ==
Certifications for Maverick a Strike
Region	Certification	Certified units/sales
United Kingdom (BPI)	2× Platinum	600,000^{^}
^{^} Shipments figures based on certification alone.
