= Finley Quaye =

Scottish musician

- Born: Finley Ellington Quaye McGowan; 25 March 1974 (age 52); Edinburgh, Scotland, United Kingdom
- Genres: Progressive soul; trip hop; reggae
- Instruments: Vocals; Guitars
- Years active: 1993–present
- Labels: Polydor; Epic

Finley Quaye (born 25 March 1974, Edinburgh, Scotland) is a Scottish musician. He won the 1997 Mobo Award for best reggae act, and the 1998 BRIT Award for Best Male Solo Artist. His debut album, Maverick a Strike, a fusion of many styles including reggae and soul, was a commercial success and was certified double platinum by the British Phonographic Industry.

== Life ==
Finley Quaye is the son of vaudeville pianist Cab Kaye and the half-brother of the English guitarist Caleb Quaye.

Born in Edinburgh, Quaye went to school in London, Manchester and Edinburgh. However, he left school with no qualifications. Before launching his music career, he took various forms of employment including car-spraying, fish-smoking, making futons and as a stage-rigger and scaffolder.

Quaye's father was born in London but considered himself as African. Although known as Cab Kaye, his full name was Nii Lante Augustus Kwamlah Quaye and he was a Chief of the Ga tribe centralized in Jamestown, Accra, Ghana. Kaye was the son of the pianist Caleb Jonas Quaye a.k.a. Mope Desmond, who was born in Accra, Ghana. Finley did not grow up with his father and only found out fully about his father's musical career when he was in his twenties. Mope Desmond, Cab Kaye and Finley Quaye have all played Glasgow's Barrowlands, Wolverhampton's Wulfrun Hall and London's Cafe de Paris. Finley was on tour with his band when he met his father for the first time in Amsterdam.

Finley Quaye was inspired early in his childhood by jazz musicians Pete King, Ronnie Scott (who began his own musical career making tea and running errands in Finley's father's band) and Lionel Hampton. As a child growing up in London, Quaye would be taken by his mother to Ronnie Scott's jazz club in Soho to catch performances of American musicians touring Europe. These included Buddy Rich, who recorded his album in 1980 and Ella Fitzgerald. Quaye's mother had a long-term relationship with musician Pete King, who hosted and performed at Ronnie Scott's. Around this time, Finley was also taken along to see the likes of The Ramones. In Edinburgh, shows that made an impact in his early years included Frank Chickens at The Hole in the Ground during the Fringe Festival. He also saw Peter Green of Fleetwood Mac at The Venue with Cozy Powell on drums around 1990. Art was also a constant influence and source of inspiration on Quaye's mindset and artistic approach. He attended The Frieze ART Fair at Regent's Park as well as Gilbert & George and Harlan Miller exhibitions and opening nights. He presented awards at The Indian Film Awards at The O2 Arena in London as well as David Gray's Ivor Novello at The Dorchester Hotel in London.

The younger of Finley's two sons, Caleb Quaye, took his own life in 2023.

== Career ==
Quaye made a solo recording contract with Polydor Records and moved to New York City. He began working with Epic/Sony unlawfully while he was still signed to Polydor, and in late 1997 he reached the UK Top 20 twice, with "Sunday Shining" and "Even After All". His reputation was established by Maverick a Strike, released in September 1997. It went gold less than three weeks later, and led directly to the BRIT Award victory. The album is now certified 2× platinum in the UK. In 1998, Quaye recorded and produced George Gershwin's "It Ain't Necessarily So" for the Red Hot Organization's compilation album Red Hot + Rhapsody, a tribute to George Gershwin, which raised money for various charities devoted to increasing AIDS awareness.

Two more albums were released on Epic, Vanguard (2000) and Much More Than Much Love (2004). "Spiritualized" became his last single to score a top 40 landing in the UK chart when it was released in September 2000, reaching number 26. In 2004 the single "Dice" was released in collaboration with William Orbit and featuring Beth Orton. The song featured in Fox Network's The OC and on the season 1 soundtrack, becoming a minor hit.

He released the EP Pound for Pound with Intune Records in 2008, with Norman Grant of the Twinkle Brothers featuring Sly Dunbar and Lloyd Parks.

Three albums were made between 2019 and 2023 but also removed from distribution and outlets because of lack of recognition, interest or support in the United kingdom in terms of live agents, labels and publishers. This was the sole reason for the removal of the material.

== Discography ==
=== Studio albums ===
Year	Album	Peak positions					Certifications
Year	Album	UK	AUS	FRA	NL	NZ	Certifications
1997	Maverick a Strike	3	77	38	46	11	UK: 2× Platinum
2000	Vanguard	35	—	44	—	—	
2003	Much More Than Much Love	56	—	148	—	—	
2012	28th February Rd.	—	—	—	—	—	
2014	Royal Rasses	—	—	—	—	—	
2017	Straight from the Country	—	—	—	—	—	
2019	Faux Naïf	—	—	—	—	—	
2021	Sycamore Seeds Under The Sycamore Tree	—	—	—	—	—	
2022	A Sign of Things To Come	—	—	—	—	—	
2025	It is your time						
"—" denotes releases that did not chart or were not released.

=== Compilations ===
- The Best of the Epic Years 1995-2003 (2008)

=== Extended plays ===
- Oranges and Lemons (2005)
- Pound For Pound (2008)

=== Singles ===
Year	Single	Peak positions				Album
Year	Single	UK	NL	US Alt.	US Dance Sales	Album
1997	"Sunday Shining"	16	80	26	—	Maverick a Strike
1997	"Even After All"	10	—	—	—	Maverick a Strike
1997	"It's Great When We're Together"	27	—	—	—	Maverick a Strike
1998	"Your Love Gets Sweeter"	16	—	—	—	Maverick a Strike
1998	"Ultra Stimulation"	51	—	—	—	Maverick a Strike
2000	"Spiritualized"	26	—	—	—	Vanguard
2000	"When I Burn off into the Distance"	80	—	—	—	Vanguard
2003	"Dice" (with William Orbit)	—	—	—	18	Much More Than Much Love
2003	"Something to Say" (promotional single)	—	—	—	—	Much More Than Much Love
2006	"For My Childrens Love"	—	—	—	—	Royal Rasses
"—" denotes releases that did not chart or were not released.

=== Other collaborations ===
- "Finley's Rainbow" on A Guy Called Gerald's Black Secret Technology (1995)
- "Caravan" on Timo Maas' album Loud (2002)
- "Stranges Changes" on A Guy Called Gerald's To All Things What They Need (2005)
- "We Are Dreamers" on Cathy Claret's album Gypsy Flower (2007)
- "After Tonight" on Ava Leigh's La La La (2007)
- "Metamorphosis" on Christopher Chaplin's album M (2020)
