= Rock & Roll Queen =

"Rock and Roll Queen"

Single by The Subways

from the album Young for Eternity
- Released: 20 June 2005
- Genre: Alternative rock, garage punk
- Label: Infectious, Warner Bros.
- Songwriters: Billy Lunn, Charlotte Cooper, Josh Morgan

The Subways singles chronology
"Oh Yeah" (2005)	"Rock and Roll Queen" (2005)	"With You" (2005)

"Rock & Roll Queen" is a single from the British indie rock band The Subways, from their debut record Young for Eternity. It is the third single from the CD. It was featured on the hit drama The OC and is track 1 on Music from the OC: Mix 5. It also features in British TV advertisements for Rimmel, the movie Live Free or Die Hard, the 2008 German movie Die Welle as well as appearing on the soundtracks of EA Sports games Rugby 06 and FIFA Street 2. In 2008, the song appeared in the video games Saints Row 2, Pure and Forza Horizon. It was used in the scene to introduce Evers boys in the Netflix film The School for Good and Evil. In 2014, the song was used in the TV series Chernobyl: Zone of Exclusion. The song was also used in the trailer and nightclub scene for the film RocknRolla, in which The Subways appear performing the song.

Cash Box said of the song that it has "dance drive and the power" and that it "should bring this newcomer act into top forty form."

== Track listings ==
- 7"
1. "Rock & Roll Queen"
2. "Under The Sun"
- CDS
1. "Rock & Roll Queen"
2. "Automatic"
- CDM
1. "Rock & Roll Queen"
2. "Another Sense"
3. "I Want To Hear What You Have Got To Say" (Zane Lowe Session)
4. "Rock & Roll Queen" [Video]

== Chart performance ==
The single itself reached number 22 on the UK singles chart when released on 20 June 2005.

== Certifications ==
Certifications for "Rock & Roll Queen"
Region	Certification	Certified units/sales
United Kingdom (BPI)	Silver	200,000^{‡}
^{‡} Sales+streaming figures based on certification alone.
