= Oh Yeah (The Subways song) =

Single by The Subways

from the album Young for Eternity
- Released: 21 March 2005
- Genre: Alternative rock, garage rock, indie rock
- Length: 2:57
- Label: Infectious Records
- Songwriters: Billy Lunn, Charlotte Cooper, Josh Morgan

The Subways singles chronology
"1am" (2004)	"Oh Yeah" (2005)	"Rock & Roll Queen" (2005)

"Oh Yeah" was the second single from the British indie rock band The Subways, off of their debut record Young for Eternity.

It features in the episode of Rescue Me, "Karate" in the scene where the character Lou shaved his testicles.

Two music videos were created for the song. The original, released when the band was under Infectious Records, features the band playing the song inside. The newer video, filmed after they signed with Warner Brothers, shows the band playing the song in a building while girls in short skirts go about on rollerskates. The latter was directed by Brett Simon.

The song features in an advertisement for football in The Sun newspaper.

== Track listings ==
- 7"
1. "Oh Yeah"
2. "I Am Young"
- CDS
1. "Oh Yeah"
2. "Take Me Away"

== Chart performance ==
The track reached number 25 on the UK singles chart when released in March 2005.
