= Money and Celebrity =

Studio album by The Subways
- Released: 18 September 2011
- Recorded: 2010
- Genres: Alternative rock; post-grunge; punk rock; post-punk revival
- Length: 37:45
- Labels: Cooking Vinyl, Warner Bros.
- Producer: Stephen Street

The Subways chronology
All or Nothing (2008)	Money and Celebrity (2011)	The Subways (2015)

Singles from Money and Celebrity
- 1. "We Don't Need Money To Have A Good Time" Released: 11 September 2011; 2. "It's A Party" Released: 2 January 2012; 3. "Kiss Kiss Bang Bang" Released: 7 May 2012

Professional ratings
Review scores
Source	Rating
Allmusic	3/5 stars
Gigwise	3/5 stars
The Fly	3/5 stars
The Music Fix	8/10 stars
The Music Service	5/10 stars
NME	3/10 stars

Money and Celebrity is the third studio album by English rock trio The Subways, produced by Stephen Street. It was released on 18 September 2011. The making of the album was fan funded with fans pledging on exclusive offers made by the band through their PledgeMusic campaign. A percentage of money made was donated to charity (Clic Sargent) and the online updates meant the band discussed artwork designs and tracks directly with their fans as the album was put together. Pledges included "Gold passes" to every show the band played, exclusive acoustic performances, signed lyric sheets, limited run T-shirt designs and many more. The album was then licensed to Warner for Germany, Switzerland, Austria, Poland and Japan and label services provided by Cooking Vinyl for the UK and ROW.

== Singles ==
- "It's a Party" was released on the Subways official website as the first preview of the album.
- "We Don't Need Money To Have A Good Time" was released as the first single from the album on 11 September 2011. Although the song failed to chart, it spent many weeks on the A-list for BBC Radio 1 and received considerable airplay as a result.
- "It's a Party" was released as an official single on 2 January 2012 and B-listed by BBC Radio 1 .
- "Kiss Kiss Bang Bang" was released on 7 May 2012 as the third single from the album.

== Track listing ==
All tracks are written by Billy Lunn & The Subways.

No.	Title	Length
1.	"It's A Party"	3:26
2.	"We Don't Need Money to Have a Good Time"	3:13
3.	"Celebrity"	3:24
4.	"I Wanna Dance with You"	3:04
5.	"Popdeath"	3:23
6.	"Like I Love You"	2:52
7.	"Money"	3:37
8.	"Kiss Kiss Bang Bang"	3:01
9.	"Down Our Street"	2:44
10.	"Rumour"	3:10
11.	"Friday"	2:42
12.	"Leave My Side"	3:09

All tracks are written by Billy Lunn.

Bonus Tracks
No.	Title	Length
13.	"Latest Story (Japanese Bonus Track)"	3:39
14.	"Varsity Fox (Japanese Bonus Track)"	2:53
15.	"The Devil and Me (iTunes Bonus Track)"	3:28
16.	"Heartbreaker (Bonus Demo Track)"	3:06
17.	"Massive Adventures (Bonus Demo Track)"	3:09

== History ==
During the period between the previous album All Or Nothing and the current one, the band created around 50 songs and decided against using them for the latest installment. Billy began writing for the album when he and some friends of his went to a local pub, they had just lost their jobs due to the current climate in the economy. Whilst they were drinking Billy found that he had no more money left for drinks and one of his friends said "Billy, we don't need money to have a good time" and from there Billy ran home and for the first time wrote the lyrics to a song before the music. From 12 September 2011, NME Magazine began streaming the album in its entirety. On 15 September, the band let PledgeMusic customers download their version of the album, posing the question of which track was to be the next single from the LP.

== Charts ==
Upon release, the album reached #43 in the UK Albums Chart and #16 in Germany's official charts, the Media Control Charts.

== Personnel ==
- The Subways — Music on all tracks
- Billy Lunn — Guitar, vocals, lyrics on all tracks except for track 4
- Charlotte Cooper — Bass, vocals
- Josh Morgan — Drums
- Stephen Street — Mixed and produced all of the album except for track 2
- Adrian Bushby — Mixed and produced track 2
- Jason Perry and Daniel P. Carter — Co-songwriters on track four
