= RocknRolla =

2008 film by Guy Ritchie

- UK theatrical release poster
- Directed by: Guy Ritchie
- Written by: Guy Ritchie
- Produced by: Joel Silver; Susan Downey; Steve Clark-Hall; Guy Ritchie
- Starring: Gerard Butler; Tom Wilkinson; Thandiwe Newton; Mark Strong; Idris Elba; Tom Hardy; Toby Kebbell; Jeremy Piven; Ludacris
- Cinematography: David Higgs
- Edited by: James Herbert
- Music by: Steve Isles
- Production companies: Dark Castle Entertainment; Silver Pictures; Toff Guy Films
- Distributed by: Warner Bros. Pictures (international); StudioCanal (France)
- Release dates: 4 September 2008 (TIFF); 5 September 2008 (United Kingdom); 31 October 2008 (United States); 19 November 2008 (France)
- Running time: 114 minutes
- Countries: United States; United Kingdom; France
- Languages: English; French; Russian
- Budget: $18 million
- Box office: $25 million

RocknRolla is a 2008 crime comedy film written and directed by Guy Ritchie, featuring an ensemble cast that includes Gerard Butler, Tom Wilkinson, Thandiwe Newton, Mark Strong, Idris Elba, Tom Hardy, Toby Kebbell, Jeremy Piven and Ludacris. It was released in the United Kingdom on 5 September 2008, reaching number one in the UK box office in its first week of release. The film received mixed reviews from critics.

== Plot ==
In London, mob boss Lenny Cole rules the ever-growing real estate business, using a corrupt councillor for bureaucratic fixing, and his right-hand man Archy for the dirty side of things. A billionaire Russian businessman, Uri Omovich, plans a fixed land deal, and London's crooks all seem to want a piece of it — particularly Uri's underhanded accountant Stella, and a gang called "The Wild Bunch" led by small-time crook "One-Two", his partner "Mumbles", and their driver "Handsome Bob".

Uri agrees to Lenny's price of €7,000,000 for bribing the council, and as a sign of trust, lends him his "lucky painting". Yet when Uri arranges for Stella to move the funds, she double-crosses him and hires the Wild Bunch to steal the money. Additionally, Lenny's estranged and drug-addicted stepson Johnny Quid steals the painting from Lenny's office after faking his own death. Lenny and Archy then coerce Johnny's former talent managers Mickey and Roman into tracking down Johnny. In a subplot, Handsome Bob gets close to Stella's gay husband, a lawyer who has information on a longtime unknown informant in their criminal circle, and asks One-Two for a single dance before Bob goes to prison after the informant exposed him.

Uri tasks Stella once more with covertly siphoning the necessary payoff from his holdings, despite his growing suspicion of her. Yet when his moneymen are once again robbed by the Wild Bunch, his assistant Victor convinces him that Lenny is likely to be behind the robberies, and is also purposely keeping Uri's lucky painting from him. Uri and Victor then invite Lenny to a private golf game, where Victor beats him with a golf club, finishing by breaking Lenny's leg as a warning to return his painting.

Wild Bunch friend Cookie happens to buy the painting from a couple of crackheads who stole it from Johnny's hideout. Cookie then gives the painting to One-Two, who in turn offers it to Stella as a token of appreciation after a sexual encounter. After Stella leaves his flat, One-Two is surprised by Uri's henchmen but is rescued, and subsequently kidnapped, by Archy and his goons, who had come looking for Uri's money.

Uri wants to marry Stella, whom he has long admired. He goes to Stella's house to propose, but he then spots the painting. Stella lies and says she has had it for years. Uri, enraged by Stella's betrayal, orders Victor to kill her.

Archy brings Johnny, Roman, Mickey and the Wild Bunch to Lenny's warehouse where Lenny orders Johnny and the Wild Bunch executed. Handsome Bob offers the legal documents concerning the informant in his pocket to Archy. Archy recognizes the pseudonym used on documents, "Sidney Shaw", as belonging to Lenny. Lenny had arranged with the police to routinely lock up many criminal associates (including Archy) for years at a time to ensure his own freedom and while also enhancing his own standing in the criminal underworld. Archy orders Lenny's men to free the Wild Bunch and has Lenny drowned and fed to crayfish.

In the elevator, Johnny explains to Roman and Mickey that they will also be killed to leave no witnesses, and graphically explains the manner of their executions. His description unnerves the man tasked to execute the trio, prompting him to act prematurely. Having already anticipated this move, Johnny warns Mickey and Roman to intervene and kill their would-be executioner. Johnny shoots two more men waiting at the top of the elevator and with help from the Wild Bunch, they escape the last of Archy's men.

Later, Archy picks up Johnny from rehab and gives him Uri's lucky painting as a welcome home present, remarking that obtaining the painting "cost a very wealthy Russian an arm and a leg". Johnny proclaims that, with his new-found freedom from addiction and his stepfather, he will do what he could not do before: "become a real RocknRolla".

In a post-credit scene, One-Two accedes to Handsome Bob's request to dance with him.

== Cast ==
- Gerard Butler as "One-Two", a mobster who is the leader of the Wild Bunch.
- Tom Wilkinson as Lenny Cole, the head of London's declining old school mob regime.
- Thandiwe Newton (Note: credited as Thandie Newton) as Stella, Uri's accountant and One-Two's love interest.
- Mark Strong as Archy, Lenny Cole's right-hand man and the film's narrator.
- Idris Elba as "Mumbles", One-Two's partner and a member of the Wild Bunch.
- Tom Hardy as Bob "Handsome Bob", a member of the Wild Bunch who is a closeted gay man who has a semi-secret crush on One-Two.
- Karel Roden as Uri Omovich, a Russian business oligarch.
- Toby Kebbell as Johnny Quid, a musician and Lenny's estranged and drug-addicted stepson who faked his own death after anticipating that the news of his demise would cause his music sales to go up. Lenny and Archy took care of him after his birth father abandoned him and his mother was admitted to a mental asylum, where she subsequently committed suicide by slashing herself with a razor during a hot bath.
- Ludacris (Note: credited as Chris Bridges) as Mickey, one of Johnny Quid's former talent managers.
- Jeremy Piven as Roman, one of Johnny Quid's former talent managers.

In addition to the film's main cast, its supporting cast features Jimi Mistry as the Councillor, Matt King as "Cookie", Dragan Mićanović as Victor (Omovich's right-hand man), David Bark-Jones as Bertie (Stella's gay husband who works as a criminal lawyer), Geoff Bell as Fred "The Head", Gemma Arterton as June, Nonso Anozie as "Tank", David Leon as Malcolm, Bronson Webb as Paul, Michael Ryan as Pete, Jamie Campbell Bower as "Rocker", Tiffany Mulheron as Jackie, and Robert Stone as the nightclub bouncer. A scheduling conflict prevented the casting of Jason Statham, who had appeared in three of Ritchie's earlier films.

== Production ==
In May 2007, director Guy Ritchie announced the production of RocknRolla, to be produced by Ritchie's own company, Toff Guy Films, Joel Silver's Dark Castle Entertainment, and French company StudioCanal, with distribution by Warner Bros. Pictures The following June, Ritchie hired the cast for RocknRolla, and filming began on location in London on 19 June 2007. Two scenes were filmed at Stoke Park, Buckinghamshire: the opening scene on the grass tennis courts, and the round of golf which takes place on the 21st green with the clubhouse in the background. The film was shot on the Arriflex D-20.

During post-production, producer Joel Silver, screened the film to several studios, including Lionsgate and Sony Pictures. Warner Bros. Pictures handled distribution for the film, and it was released theatrically on 5 September 2008 in the UK and 10 October 2008 in the U.S.

== Reception ==
=== Critical response ===
Critical reaction to the film has been mixed, with a 60% rating out of 147 reviews on the film review aggregator website Rotten Tomatoes, with an average rating of 5.98/10. The critical consensus states: "Mixed reviews for Guy Ritchie's return to his London-based cockney wideboy gangster movie roots, but most agree, it's a step in the right direction following two major turkeys." The website Metacritic, which compiles and then aggregates major film critics' reviews, gave the film a 53 out of 100, which is categorised as having mixed or average reviews. While the film's unoriginal themes were criticised, the script and direction, as well as the performances of Strong, Butler and Kebbell, were praised.

IGN gave the film a positive review with four out of five stars, saying "[Guy Ritchie is] hardly re-inventing the wheel with this movie, but RocknRolla is nonetheless a comedy thriller that is every bit as accomplished as his early work, and without doubt a witty, adrenaline-fuelled blast from start to finish". Roger Ebert gave the film three stars, stating that "It never slows down enough to be really good, and never speeds up enough to be the Bourne Mortgage Crisis, but there's one thing for sure: British actors love playing gangsters as much as American actors love playing cowboys, and it's always nice to see people having fun".

=== Box office ===
The film was No. 1 at the UK box office in its first week of release. The film took a total gross of US$25,739,015 worldwide, compared to US$83,000,000 for Snatch (2000), seeing a modest return on the film's US$18,000,000 budget.

== Soundtrack ==
RocknRolla

Soundtrack album by Various artists
- Released: 30 September 2008
- Genres: Rock, reggae, garage rock, funk, indie rock, hard rock, Latin, beat
- Label: Varese Sarabande

United Kingdom edition

1. "Dialogue Clip: People Ask the Question" – Mark Strong
2. "I'm a Man" – Black Strobe
3. "Have Love, Will Travel" – The Sonics
4. "Dialogue Clip: No School Like the Old School" – Various Artists
5. "Bankrobber" – The Clash
6. "The Trip" – Kim Fowley
7. "Dialogue Clip: Slap Him!" – Various Artists
8. "Ruskies" – Steve Isles
9. "Outlaw" – War
10. "Waiting for a Train" – Flash and the Pan
11. "Dialogue Clip: Junkies" – Various Artists
12. "Rock & Roll Queen" – The Subways
13. "The Gun" – Lou Reed
14. "The Stomp" – The Hives
15. "We Had Love" – The Scientists
16. "Dialogue Clip: Sausage & Beans" – Various Artists
17. "Mirror in the Bathroom" – The Beat
18. "Funnel of Love" – Wanda Jackson
19. "Such a Fool" – 22-20s
20. "Dopilsya" – Sektor Gaza
21. "Negra Leono" – Miguelito Valdés

== Future ==
Newton revealed that Ritchie stated that he hopes to extend RocknRolla into a trilogy, in the event that the film receives enough positive attention. At the end of the film there is a title card stating "Johnny, Archy and the Wild Bunch will be back in The Real RocknRolla". According to both the audio commentary and an interview with Ritchie, the second film has been written and is awaiting studio approval.

In a 2011 interview, promoting Sherlock Holmes: A Game of Shadows, when asked about a possible RocknRolla sequel, Ritchie said "You know, I've spent a lot of time thinking about it! I've written a script, I think it's a great script, and Joel [Silver] wants to pay for me to do it. But up until now we haven't had the time to do it. It's sitting there and we'd all like to do it, it's just a question of when we're going to fit it in. So we'll wait and see". He also mentioned that as long as Warner Bros. keeps throwing him "big movies like the Sherlock Holmes films and The Man from UNCLE, then it may not be happening soon".
