= Mosquitos (band) =

- Origin: New York City
- Genres: Indie pop, Bossa nova
- Years active: 2003–present
- Labels: Bar/None Records
- Members: Chris Root; Jon Marshall Smith; JuJu Stulbach
- Website: Chris Root Music

Mosquitos is a New York City–based musical band consisting of guitarist Chris Root, keyboardist Jon Marshall Smith, and Brazilian singer JuJu Stulbach. The sound of Mosquitos has been described as a mix of bossa nova and indie pop.

== History ==
Root and Stulbach met in New York City, and later recorded their first tracks together in Brazil. Root had to leave Brazil without a finished mix, but soon after met Smith back in New York City. Eventually the three teamed up and formed Mosquitos. Much of the band's lyrics are autobiographical, referring to the relationship between Root and Stulbach.

Billboard described the band's self-titled debut studio album as "an album that is pleasant enough: often sweet, often avant-garde (witness first track “Rainsong”) and often too simplistic."

== Discography ==
- 2003 - Mosquitos (Bar/None Records)
- 2004 - Sunshine Barato (Bar/None Records)
- 2006 - III (Bar/None Records)
- 2017 - Mexican Dust (Six Degrees Records)
