= The O.C. season 1 =

The O.C.
- Season 1
- DVD cover
- No. of episodes: 27

Release
- Original network: Fox
- Original release: August 5, 2003 – May 5, 2004

Season chronology
- Next → Season 2

The first season of The O.C. commenced airing in the United States on August 5, 2003, concluded on May 5, 2004, and consisted of 27 episodes. It tells the story of "the Cohen and Cooper families, and Ryan Atwood, a troubled teen from the wrong side of the tracks" who is thrust into the wealthy, harbor-front community of Newport Beach, Orange County, California and "will forever change the lives of the residents".

The first seven episodes of The O.C. aired in the United States on Tuesdays at 9:00 p.m. on Fox. Following a seven-week mid-season hiatus, the remainder of the season aired on Wednesdays at 9:00 pm. The season was released on DVD as a seven disc boxed set under the title of The O.C.: The Complete First Season on September 26, 2004, by Warner Home Video. On June 17, 2008, the season became available to purchase for registered users of the US iTunes Store.

In the United Kingdom, the season premiere aired at 9:00 pm. Sunday March 7, 2004, on Channel 4 with the second episode airing immediately after, on sister station E4. After taking a hiatus over the summer, the show returned in early September to a 1:00 p.m. slot as part of T4. In Canada it aired on CTV Television Network and in Australia it was first broadcast on Nine Network, but dropped it after three episodes. Network Ten subsequently picked up the show, airing it in its entirety.

== Synopsis ==
The season follows the Cohen and Cooper families, and high school sophomore Ryan Atwood, described as "a troubled teen from the wrong side of the tracks" who is thrust into the wealthy, harbor-front community of Newport Beach, Orange County, California and "will forever change the lives of the residents".

== Cast and characters ==
=== Regular ===
- Peter Gallagher as Sandy Cohen (27 episodes)
- Kelly Rowan as Kirsten Cohen (27 episodes)
- Benjamin McKenzie as Ryan Atwood (27 episodes)
- Mischa Barton as Marissa Cooper (27 episodes)
- Adam Brody as Seth Cohen (27 episodes)
- Chris Carmack as Luke Ward (20 episodes)
- Tate Donovan as Jimmy Cooper (24 episodes)
- Melinda Clarke as Julie Cooper (episode 14 onwards; recurring ep. 1–13) (23 episodes)
- Rachel Bilson as Summer Roberts (episode 14 onwards; recurring ep. 1–13) (27 episodes)

=== Recurring ===
- Alan Dale as Caleb Nichol (14 episodes)
- Samaire Armstrong as Anna Stern (13 episodes)
- Amanda Righetti as Hailey Nichol (10 episodes)
- Navi Rawat as Theresa Diaz (8 episodes)
- Ashley Hartman as Holly Ficher (6 episodes)
- Taylor Handley as Oliver Trask (6 episodes)
- Shailene Woodley as Kaitlin Cooper (6 episodes)
- Bonnie Somerville as Rachel Hoffman (5 episodes)
- Kim Oja as Taryn Baker (4 episodes)
- Rosalind Chao as Dr Kim (3 episodes)

== Episodes ==
No. overall	No. in season	Title	Directed by	Written by	Original release date	Prod. code	U.S. viewers (millions)
1	1	"Premiere"	Doug Liman	Josh Schwartz	August 5, 2003	475197	7.46
Just after Ryan escapes jail time and is kicked out by his mother, his attorney, Sandy Cohen, brings him home, to the dismay of his wife, Kirsten. Ryan meets their son, Seth, and other Newport teenagers who lead him to trouble, making Kirsten think again about letting Ryan stay in their home.
2	2	"The Model Home"	Doug Liman	Story by : Allan Heinberg & Josh Schwartz; Teleplay by : Josh Schwartz	August 12, 2003	176501	7.86
Marissa and Seth convince Ryan not to leave Newport, and hide him in one of Kirsten's vacant model homes, but their plan backfires horribly.
3	3	"The Gamble"	Ian Toynton	Jane Espenson	August 19, 2003	176502	7.96
Sandy comes to Ryan's rescue once again. Kirsten decides to invite Dawn to an elite Casino Night, however the night forces Dawn to make a life altering decision. Julie begins to get vengeful after hearing about Kirsten's generous gift to Jimmy. Tension is still high between Marissa and Luke. Seth gets the night of his dreams.
4	4	"The Debut"	Daniel Attias	Allan Heinberg & Josh Schwartz	August 26, 2003	176503	8.65
Now that Ryan is staying with the Cohens, he must attend the Cotillion Ball, where Newport's finest young ladies enter society, but the event is a disaster. Jimmy becomes a suspect of a fraud investigation.
5	5	"The Outsider"	Jesús Salvador Treviño	Melissa Rosenberg	September 2, 2003	176504	9.13
Ryan gets a job and meets Donnie, a Newport teen from Corona, who gives Seth a taste of the wild side. Following Cotillion, Marissa and Julie find their reputations in jeopardy.
6	6	"The Girlfriend"	Steve Robman	Story by : Debra J. Fisher & Erica Messer; Teleplay by : Josh Schwartz	September 9, 2003	176505	9.09
Kirsten's father, Caleb Nichol, comes to town with his new 24-year-old girlfriend, Gabrielle. Marissa isn't ready to pick between Luke and Ryan. Summer's growing feelings for Seth begin to show.
7	7	"The Escape"	Sanford Bookstaver	Josh Schwartz	September 16, 2003	176506	8.77
With the summer ending, Ryan and Seth tag along with Summer and Marissa in a intense road trip to Tijuana that takes a fatal turn. Kirsten is upset that Sandy is considering the job, and finds herself in a compromising position with Jimmy in his new apartment.
8	8	"The Rescue"	Michael Lange	Story by : Allan Heinberg; Teleplay by : Melissa Rosenberg	October 29, 2003	176507	9.27
After Marissa's attempted suicide, Julie tries to make an altering decision for her that has her moving to San Diego. Meanwhile, Ryan must take a placement test to determine his enrollment at The Harbor School. Sandy finds himself in the hot seat after being caught by Kirsten out with a female colleague.
9	9	"The Heights"	Patrick Norris	Debra J. Fisher & Erica Messer	November 5, 2003	176508	7.52
Ryan doesn't feel like he belongs at Harbor and Luke doesn't help his situation. Summer keeps her friendship with Seth private, but is jealous of his relationship with Anna. Sandy accepts a case against Caleb at his new job, that will test his relationship with Kirsten.
10	10	"The Perfect Couple"	Michael Fresco	Allan Heinberg	November 12, 2003	176509	8.28
Kirsten becomes worried about Sandy's professional relationship with Rachel. Ryan spots Caleb and Julie together and is stuck between a rock and a hard place. Summer tries to admit her feelings to Seth.
11	11	"The Homecoming"	Keith Samples	Josh Schwartz & Brian Oh	November 19, 2003	176510	9.03
As Ryan and Marissa go to Chino to visit Trey for Thanksgiving, Ryan crashes into the past. Seth must choose between Anna and Summer. Kirsten and Sandy make an attempt to set up Jimmy and Rachel.
12	12	"The Secret"	James Marshall	Allan Heinberg & Josh Schwartz	November 26, 2003	176511	7.02
Ryan's trust is put to the test when he catches an unexpected moment that could ruin Luke. After thanksgiving, Seth finds himself on the outs with both Anna and Summer.
13	13	"The Best Chrismukkah Ever"	Sanford Bookstaver	Stephanie Savage	December 3, 2003	176512	9.27
Kirsten learns something about her father that'll help Sandy's case, but will put her job in jeopardy. Ryan's Christmas does not go as planned. Marissa meets someone in therapy. Meanwhile, Seth struggles choosing between Anna and Summer.
14	14	"The Countdown"	Michael Fresco	Josh Schwartz	December 17, 2003	176513	7.99
Kirsten's drifter younger sister, Hailey, crashes at the Cohen's home and throws a New Year's Eve party that gets out of control. Ryan is worried about Marissa's relationship with Oliver. Anna decides to spend her night with Seth, without Summer's knowledge.
15	15	"The Third Wheel"	Sandy Smolan	Melissa Rosenberg	January 7, 2004	176514	9.37
Hailey realizes she overstayed her welcome at the Cohen residence. Oliver invites the gang to a Rooney concert, but Ryan catches him in a complicating situation. Seth has difficulties telling Summer about his relationship with Anna.
16	16	"The Links"	Michael Lange	Debra J. Fisher & Erica Messer	January 14, 2004	176515	8.57
Oliver's friendship with Marissa strains her relationship with Ryan. Summer becomes jealous of Seth and Anna's relationship. Meanwhile, Hailey and Kirsten clash when Kirsten convinces Caleb of an devastating idea.
17	17	"The Rivals"	Ian Toynton	Josh Schwartz	January 21, 2004	176516	12.72
Oliver transfers to Harbor, while Ryan risks his academic future to expose him. Seth becomes jealous of Summer's relationship with Danny, forcing him to doubt his relationship with Anna. Meanwhile, Jimmy and Sandy go into business together. Also, Kirsten gets worried about the company when Caleb hires Julie as an interior designer.
18	18	"The Truth"	Rodman Flender	Allan Heinberg	February 11, 2004	176517	12.70
Luke starts to see Oliver's true colors after he gets Ryan suspended, but Marissa won't see it. Anna confronts Seth about his relationship with Summer. Meanwhile, Caleb gets Kirsten to break up with Julie for him.
19	19	"The Heartbreak"	Lev L. Spiro	Josh Schwartz	February 18, 2004	176518	10.95
Ryan and Marissa need to rebuild trust after the incident with Oliver, but it's hard when a surprise comes to town. Jimmy discovers he has a secret admirer, while Luke spends the night with Julie. Meanwhile, Seth and Summer make big step with their emotions.
20	20	"The Telenovela"	Sanford Bookstaver	Stephanie Savage	February 25, 2004	176519	9.56
Ryan realizes Theresa isn't telling him the truth on why she's staying in Newport. Summer keeps her relationship with Seth private, forcing him to Anna for support. Meanwhile, Sandy finds himself in the middle of Caleb's mess. Also, Jimmy suspects something between Julie and Luke.
21	21	"The Goodbye Girl"	Patrick Norris	Josh Schwartz	March 3, 2004	176520	10.27
Seth feels guilty when Anna announces she's moving back to Pittsburgh. Legal troubles brew for Caleb and Kirsten, while Sandy works to solve them. Luke and Julie find their secret affair harder to maintain. Meanwhile, Theresa's boyfriend from Chino arrives bringing trouble.
22	22	"The L.A."	David M. Barrett	Josh Schwartz	March 24, 2004	176521	11.09
Ryan, Marissa, Seth and Summer head down to L.A. and find a bombshell. Jimmy and Sandy approach Caleb for business help. Meanwhile, Ryan tries to keep Luke and Julie's affair a secret from Marissa.
23	23	"The Nana"	Michael Lange	Allan Heinberg	March 31, 2004	176522	11.37
Sandy's mother from Florida comes to Newport for a visit with a different attitude. Ryan searches for Marissa. Jimmy and Hailey take a step forward with their newfound romance.
24	24	"The Proposal"	Helen Shaver	Liz Friedman & Josh Schwartz	April 14, 2004	176523	10.50
Still on the outs with her mom and Luke, Marissa begins hanging with her friends a lot more. Meanwhile, Jimmy becomes an obstacle in getting a liquor license. Caleb proposes to Julie.
25	25	"The Shower"	Sandy Smolan	J. J. Philbin	April 21, 2004	176524	10.13
Kirsten and Marissa throw a bridal shower for Julie, but Marissa invites an unwanted guest from Julie's past. Theresa calls Sandy for legal advice, but tries to avoid Ryan. Hailey and Jimmy continue their romance. Meanwhile, Summer is disappointed when Seth meets her father.
26	26	"The Strip"	James Marshall	Allan Heinberg	April 28, 2004	176525	10.52
While the boys are in Las Vegas, Jimmy and Sandy learn Caleb's true motives. Hailey devises a plan in an attempt to get Caleb to break it off with Julie. Marissa spends the night with Theresa and discovers something that might affect her.
27	27	"The Ties That Bind"	Patrick Norris	Josh Schwartz	May 5, 2004	176526	10.72
Caleb and Julie officially get married, and Marissa moves in with them. Ryan and Theresa face a difficult decision regarding her pregnancy. Seth makes a bold move when things around him start to fall apart.

== Crew ==
The season was produced by Warner Bros. Television, Hypnotic (now Dutch Oven) and Wonderland. The executive producers were creator Josh Schwartz, Doug Liman, Dave Bartis and McG, with showrunner Bob DeLaurentis joining them after the pilot episode. Melissa Rosenberg and Allan Heinberg served as co-executive producers. Stephanie Savage was supervising producer and Loucas George producer. The staff writers were Schwartz, Savage, Heinberg, Rosenberg, Jane Espenson, Debra J. Fisher, Erica Messer, Brian Oh, J.J. Philbin and Liz Friedman. The regular directors throughout the season were Liman, Sanford Bookstaver, Michael Lange, Patrick Norris, Michael Fresco, James Marshall and Sandy Smolan.

== Casting ==
Season 1 cast; from left to right: Jimmy, Summer, Marissa, Julie, Ryan, Sandy, Kirsten, Seth and Luke.

The initial season had nine major roles receive star billing. Ben McKenzie portrayed protagonist Ryan Atwood, a troubled teenager who is thrust into the wealthy lifestyle of Newport. Mischa Barton played the girl next door, Marissa Cooper, with Tate Donovan starring as her financially troubled father Jimmy. Adam Brody acted as geeky ostracized teenager Seth Cohen with Kelly Rowan playing his mother Kirsten, the powerful businesswoman, and Peter Gallagher portraying his father, Sandy, a public defense attorney. Chris Carmack portrayed Marissa's boyfriend Luke Ward. Originally only guest stars, Melinda Clarke starred as Marissa's mother, Julie Cooper, and Rachel Bilson played Summer Roberts, best friend to Marissa and Seth's object of affection. Both gained contracts to the main cast list after thirteen episodes.

Numerous supporting characters were given expansive and recurring appearances in the progressive storyline, including Samaire Armstrong as Anna Stern, Alan Dale as wealthy businessman and father of Kirstin, Caleb Nichol. Taylor Handley played Oliver Trask, a psychotic character who viewers loved to hate. Amanda Righetti starred as Kirstin's younger sister Hailey Nichol. Navi Rawat played Theresa Diaz, childhood sweetheart of Ryan. Bonnie Somerville acted as Rachel Hoffman, a former colleague of Sandy, and Ashley Hartman portrayed Holly Fischer a friend of Marissa and Summer.

Other guest stars in recurring roles include Linda Lavin as Nana Cohen, Daphne Ashbrook as Ryan's mother Dawn and Michael Nouri as Summer's father Neil. Actors Bradley Stryker, as Ryan's brother Trey, and Shailene Woodley, as Marissa's younger sister Kaitlin, were both only guest stars at this point. However, both these characters, portrayed by different actors, would return to a larger role in later seasons.

== Reception ==
=== Ratings ===
The pilot episode of the season gained 7.5 million viewers and was nominated for a Writers Guild of America Award for best episodic drama. As the season progressed, ratings picked up with 8 million viewers tuning into for the third episode and 8.6 million viewers watching the fourth installment. This resulted in FOX initially ordering an additional six episodes. The season was split into two parts, the first consisting of seven episodes shown weekly, which averaged 8.43 million viewers. This was followed by a seven-week hiatus, in which FOX announced it had ordered another five episodes, bringing the total season to twenty-seven.

The time-slot for the second half of the season was originally planned for Thursday nights, but facing competition from CSI: Crime Scene Investigation on CBS and Will & Grace on NBC it was moved to Wednesday nights at 9:00 p.m. instead. Overall season one was the highest-rated new drama of the season among adults aged 18 to 34, averaging a total of 9.7 million viewers. The show picked up four Teen Choice Awards and was nominated for another two, as well as getting nominated for the Outstanding New Program TCA Award. In the UK, its two showings a week averaged 1.2 million viewers, and it was one of the highest rating Sunday daytime programs, also attracting fans to E4 on Monday nights. It was also well received in Australia, picking up a Logie Award for Most Popular Overseas Program in 2005.

=== Critical response ===
The first season received generally positive reviews from critics, with the review aggregator website Rotten Tomatoes reported a 77% approval rating, with an average rating of 6.56/10 and based on 22 reviews. The website's critical consensus reads, "Even though it lacks an original take on teen angst, The O.C. functions well enough for its target audience, churning plenty of soap storylines out of a talented cast." Metacritic, which uses a weighted average, assigned a score of 67 out of 100 based on reviews from 17 critics, indicating "generally favorable" reviews. However, the show did come in for some criticism. San Jose Mercury News criticized the plot and the casting saying that "the storylines usually involve the obligatory three-episode-arc drug problems or lost virginity with dialogue designed to keep a dog up to speed", and that "Whoever at FOX thought Benjamin McKenzie (Ryan on "The O.C.") could pass for anything younger than 25 should be fired". A DVD review was critical of the repetitive plot stating that "the Ryan-Marissa fol-de-rol gets tiresome as it devolves into relentless bad timing", while Entertainment Weekly did not think the acting was always up to scratch, stating "it's unfortunate to have all this potential for arm-flinging drama invested in Barton, an actress who can be as flat as a paper doll". It was also denounced for excessive brawling and glamorizing underage drinking.

== DVD release ==
The DVD release of season one was released by Warner Bros. in the US on October 26, 2004, after it had completed broadcast on television. As well as every episode from the season, the DVD release features bonus material including a preview of the second season, deleted scenes, audio commentary and behind-the-scenes featurettes.

The O.C. – The Complete First Season
Set details		Special features	
27 episodes; 7-disc set; Running Time: (Region 1) 1186 minutes; (Region 2) 999 minutes; (Region 4) 1134 minutes; 1.33:1 aspect ratio; English (Dolby Surround 2.0); Subtitles: English, French, Spanish		Unaired Scenes: Introductions by Josh Schwartz; Audio Commentary: "Pilot" – Josh Schwartz and Stephanie Savage; The O.C. Music Guide – a screen music guide for six episodes: "The Model Home"; "The Outsider"; "The Secret"; "The Countdown"; "The Telenovela"; "The Goodbye Girl"; Three Easter Eggs; Featurettes; Casting the OC - with Josh Schwartz and Casting Director Patrick Rush; The Music of the OC - with Music Supervisor Alexandra Patsavas; The Real OC – Behind-the-scenes footage and cast & crew interviews; Season 2 Sneak Peek with Cast & Creator; DVD-ROM Weblink to The O.C. Online Music Sampler	
Release dates
(United States) USA	Canada	(United Kingdom) UK	Australia
October 26, 2004		October 18, 2004	February 2, 2005
