= All or Nothing (The Subways album) =

Studio album by The Subways
- Released: 30 June 2008
- Recorded: 2007
- Studios: Conway, Hollywood, California
- Genres: Alternative rock, post-grunge, post-punk revival, punk rock
- Length: 38:23
- Label: Warner Bros.
- Producer: Butch Vig

The Subways chronology
Young for Eternity (2005)	All or Nothing (2008)	Money and Celebrity (2011)

Professional ratings
Aggregate scores
Source	Rating
Metacritic	73/100
Review scores
Source	Rating
Allmusic	3/5 stars
Alternative Press	(Oct 2008, p.161)
The Fly	3.5/5 stars
The Guardian	3/5 stars
NME	8/10 stars
PopMatters	3.5/5 stars
Q	(Aug 2008, p.143)
Spin	3/5 stars
The Times	3/5 stars
Uncut	(July 2008, p.113)

All or Nothing is the second studio album by English rock trio The Subways and was released on 30 June 2008. Recorded at Conway Recording Studios in Hollywood by producer Butch Vig, the album was preceded by the release of two singles: "Girls & Boys", released 27 March 2008, and available as a free download, and "Alright", released 16 June 2008.

== History ==
Songs such as "Kalifornia" and "Shake! Shake!" had been played as early as 2004 / 2005. More recently, songs such as "Girls & Boys", "Alright", "Obsession", "Turnaround" and "I Won't Let You Down" were played at gigs and festivals throughout 2007 and early 2008.

The album was delayed in recording after Billy Lunn was diagnosed with nodules in his vocal cords, which almost resulted in the frontman losing his voice. This led to the naming of the album All or Nothing. The effort was recorded in two periods at Conway Studios during 2007 by Butch Vig, who has produced albums for Nirvana (Nevermind), Jimmy Eat World (Chase This Light) and The Smashing Pumpkins (Gish and Siamese Dream).

The album was leaked onto the internet on 23 June 2008.

The album entered the UK album charts at number 17 on 6 July, after being released on 30 June 2008. Rock Sound ranked it at number 27 on their list of the year's best albums.

The song "Kalifornia" is credited to being featured on the video game Midnight Club: Los Angeles.

The song "I Won't Let You Down" is featured on the video game Colin McRae: Dirt 2.

The Subways performed the song "Shake! Shake!" as well playing themselves in a guest appearance in the episode "Golden Lady" of the TV series FM.

== Track listing ==
All tracks are written by Billy Lunn & The Subways, except where noted.

No.	Title	Length
1.	"Girls & Boys"	3:33
2.	"Kalifornia"	2:54
3.	"Alright"	2:51
4.	"Shake! Shake!"	2:45
5.	"Move to Newlyn"	2:44
6.	"All or Nothing"	3:12
7.	"I Won't Let You Down"	3:42
8.	"Turnaround"	2:48
9.	"Obsession"	3:08
10.	"Strawberry Blonde"	4:38
11.	"Always Tomorrow"	2:58
12.	"Lostboy" (Billy Lunn)	3:10
13.	"Streetfighter" (Japanese Bonus Track)	3:33
14.	"Burst" (Japanese Bonus Track)	3:49
15.	"Love and Death" (Australian Bonus Track)	2:52
16.	"This Is the Club for People Who Hate People" (Australian Bonus Track)	2:32
17.	"Clock" (Australian Bonus Track)	2:55
18.	"The Only Ones" (Australian Bonus Track)	2:45
Total length:		38:23

== Special Edition CD ==
1. "Love and Death" [bonus track]
2. "This Is the Club for People Who Hate People" [bonus track]
3. "All or Nothing" [25min documentary/DVD]
4. "Kalifornia" [live/DVD]
5. "Shake! Shake!" [live/DVD]
6. "Turnaround" [live/DVD]
7. "Alright" [live/DVD]

== Singles ==
1. "Girls & Boys" – 25 March 2008 (free download available through the band's MySpace page and website) – failed to chart in the UK due to it being a free download via the band's Myspace page
2. "Alright" – 16 June 2008 – charted at No.44 in the UK
3. "I Won't Let You Down" – 25 August 2008 – UK #137

("I Won't Let You Down" also went to No 3 on XFM's top 7 at 7 and has also peaked at 16 on the HMV singles chart.

== Personnel ==
- The Subways – music on all tracks (except for "Lostboy"; all music by Billy Lunn)
- Billy Lunn – guitar, vocals, lyrics on all tracks
- Charlotte Cooper – bass, vocals
- Josh Morgan – drums, vocals on "All or Nothing"
- Butch Vig – producer
- Rich Costey – mixing
- Chris Testa – engineer
