= Young for Eternity =

Studio album by the Subways
- Released: 4 July 2005
- Recorded: 2005
- Studios: Elevator Studios, Liverpool
- Genres: Garage rock, rock and roll
- Length: 42:26
- Label: Infectious
- Producer: Ian Broudie

The Subways chronology
Young for Eternity (2005)	All or Nothing (2008)

Singles from Young for Eternity
- 1. "Oh Yeah" Released: March 21, 2005; 2. "Rock & Roll Queen" Released: June 20, 2005; 3. "With You" Released: September 12, 2005; 4. "No Goodbyes" Released: December 12, 2005

Professional ratings
Aggregate scores
Source	Rating
Metacritic	71/100 (19 reviews)
Review scores
Source	Rating
The Guardian	3/5 stars
NME	(6/10)
PopMatters	(7/10)
Allmusic	3/5 stars
Prefix	3.5/5 stars
BBC	(Positive)
The A.V. Club	A−
E!	B+
Slant	3.5/5 stars
Pitchfork Media	(6.6/10)
Rolling Stone	3.5/5 stars

Young for Eternity is the debut studio album by British rock band the Subways. The album was released on 4 July 2005 by City Pavement/Infectious Records. It reached number 32 in the UK charts and was certified gold in January 2007 for shipments of 100,000 units and generated four UK Top 30 singles.

== Track listing ==
All tracks are written by The Subways.

No.	Title	Length
1.	"I Want to Hear What You Have Got to Say"	3:24
2.	"Holiday"	1:50
3.	"Rock & Roll Queen"	2:50
4.	"Mary"	2:59
5.	"Young for Eternity"	2:06
6.	"Lines of Light"	2:12
7.	"Oh Yeah"	2:57
8.	"City Pavement"	2:44
9.	"No Goodbyes"	3:30
10.	"With You"	3:00
11.	"She Sun"	3:20
12.	"Somewhere"	4:46
13.	"At 1 AM"	1:51
Total length:		42:26

Special edition bonus material
No.	Title	Length
14.	"Oh Yeah" (video)
15.	"Rock & Roll Queen" (video)
16.	"With You" (video)
17.	"No Goodbyes" (video)
18.	"The Subways: Live & Loud" (documentary)	25:00

== Personnel ==
The Subways

- Billy Lunn – guitar, vocals, lyrics
- Charlotte Cooper – bass, vocals
- Josh Morgan – drums

Additional personnel

- Ian Broudie – producer, mixer
- Jon Gray – engineer, mixer
- Stuart Nicholls – photography
- Sarh Foley – sleeve design
- Stage Three Music LTD. – publishing
