= The Subways =

English rock band

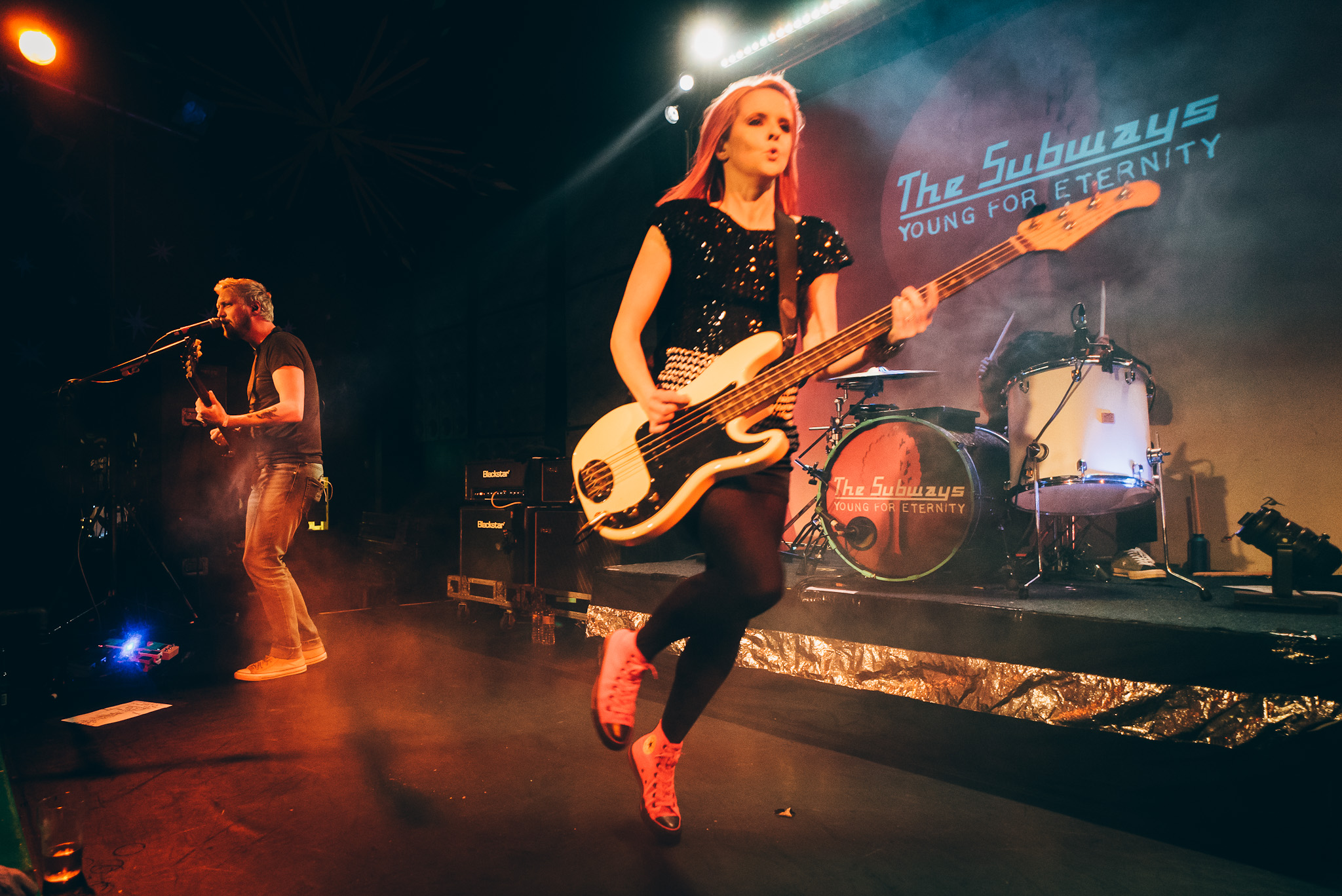
- The Subways performing live in March 2020

Background information
- Origin: Welwyn Garden City, Hertfordshire, England
- Genres: Punk rock; alternative rock; indie rock; garage rock; post-grunge; post-punk revival
- Years active: 2000–present
- Labels: Cooking Vinyl (UK); Warner Bros. (U.S.); Infectious (UK); Ferryhouse Productions (Germany)
- Members: Billy Lunn; Charlotte Cooper; Camille Phillips
- Past members: Josh Morgan
- Website: thesubways.net

The Subways is an English rock band from Welwyn Garden City, Hertfordshire. Formed in 2002, the band consists of Billy Lunn (guitar, lead vocals), Charlotte Cooper (bass, lead vocals), and Camille Phillips (drums). Founding member and original drummer Josh Morgan left the band for personal reasons in October 2020.

The Subways' debut album, Young for Eternity, was released on 4 July 2005 in the UK and 14 February 2006 in the US. Their second album, All or Nothing, was released on 30 June 2008 and their third album Money and Celebrity debuted on 19 September 2011. The band's self-titled fourth album was released on 9 February 2015, while their most-recent album, Uncertain Joys, debuted on 13 January 2023.

== History ==
=== Beginnings (2002–2004) ===
The Subways name comes from a time when brothers Billy Lunn (born William Morgan) and Josh Morgan and Charlotte Cooper used to hang around the local subway underpass which ran underneath a Welwyn Garden City roundabout. They began playing at an early age in Lunn and Morgan's home in Welwyn Garden City, first playing Nirvana, Green Day and other punk songs, under the name of Mustardseed. They later changed their name to Platypus, and began to tour small local venues, such as The Square in Harlow, Essex. An early CD of the band playing live was recorded at The Square which they sold at gigs.

The band released several demos and EPs in their early days when playing the London circuit in the UK. With every batch of new songs that The Subways would compose, Lunn would insist that the band record them. However, at such a young age the group had no money with which to go into a studio to record consistently, so they came upon the idea of buying their own cheap recording system at home. Eventually, the band had their own website, thesubways.net, which Lunn himself constructed and maintained, where they put all their new songs. Through the use of their own home recording system they now had roughly eight demos worth of songs both on the internet and being sent out to local and London promoters at various venues. The Subways then began touring in the local and London area playing regularly at the Buffalo Bar in Highbury and Islington.

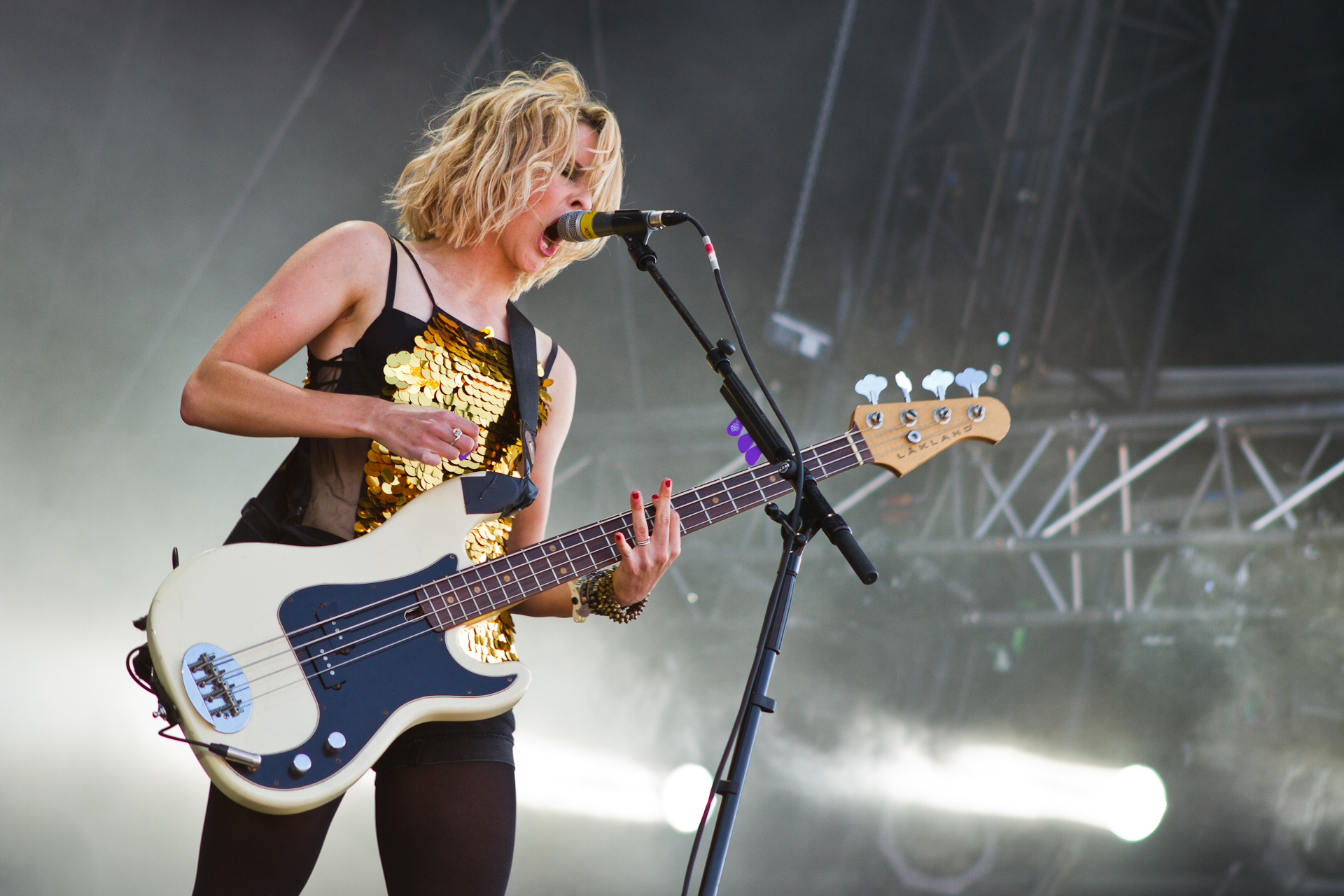
Charlotte Cooper at the Southside Festival 2014

Having the home recording system also proved useful for production: the band felt that it would not only benefit themselves, but other local bands who could not afford the studio prices, even in the Welwyn Garden City area. It was here that Billy and Charlotte both stumbled upon the opportunity that would eventually prove significant for the band. "I was producing a local Welwyn Garden City band in my front lounge one day and I noticed that it was quite good so I asked if they were going to send it to any London venues, because I knew a few that would like it. They said that they were going to send it off to Michael Eavis who runs Glastonbury Festival, and I asked why..." Michael Eavis that year was running an unsigned bands competition to play on the Other Stage, and The Subways decided that would be a great idea. "It was really just another address to send one of our CDs off to. All we wanted was to play shows and this was another great opportunity. The CD we sent off to Michael Eavis was literally one among a bunch of 30 that were being sent out to London promoters for a load of gigs we wanted to book. We never expected the phone call saying that we'd won and were to play Glastonbury", said Cooper on radio. The Subways remain friends with Eavis today, and have suggested that other upcoming bands should send demos to Eavis.

=== Young for Eternity (2004–2007) ===
After Glastonbury, The Subways went on to play The Carling Weekend 2004 in both Reading and Leeds, and then proceeded to play their very first (self funded) tour of the UK consisting of 35 dates.

John Peel was the first DJ to play single "1am" on National radio.

The band signed to City Pavement & Infectious Records in late 2004. Their first album, Young for Eternity, which was released on 4 July 2005, was produced by Lightning Seeds frontman Ian Broudie; with their debut single "Oh Yeah" reaching number 25 in the UK Singles Chart on its release week 21 March 2005.

The Subways appeared during the seventh episode of the third season of The O.C., "The Anger Management", performing two songs at the music venue 'the Bait Shop', "Rock & Roll Queen" and "Oh Yeah". The episode came to a close with "I Want to Hear What You Have Got to Say" playing.

The band postponed touring in April 2006 because Lunn had nodules on his vocal cords. They played a "secret" gig in The Green Room in their home town of Welwyn Garden City on 16 June, and also as support for the Foo Fighters in Trafford at the Lancashire County Cricket Ground on 18 June (along with Eagles of Death Metal, Angels & Airwaves and The Strokes).

In the summer of 2006 the band travelled to North America where they made numerous appearances. These included opening for the co-headlining tour of Taking Back Sunday & Angels & Airwaves and performing on the talk shows, Late Show with David Letterman and Late Night with Conan O'Brien. On 4 August they performed at the Lollapalooza music festival, and the next day they performed at Street Scene in San Diego. On 7 August they appeared on The Late Late Show with Craig Ferguson. On 25 August they returned to Reading and Leeds Festivals, this time on the main stage.

=== All or Nothing (2007–2010) ===
On 15 May 2007, the band announced they would begin recording their second album on 4 June, and the band began recording then in Los Angeles with producer Butch Vig at Conway Studios. The band had written around twenty-five tracks which were recorded over a period of several months. In August 2007 the band came back to the UK and played a series of small warm-up shows showcasing their new material, before playing at the Reading and Leeds Festivals. On 3 September 2007, the band returned to Los Angeles to complete work on their second album. On 17 October 2007 the band finished recording All or Nothing.

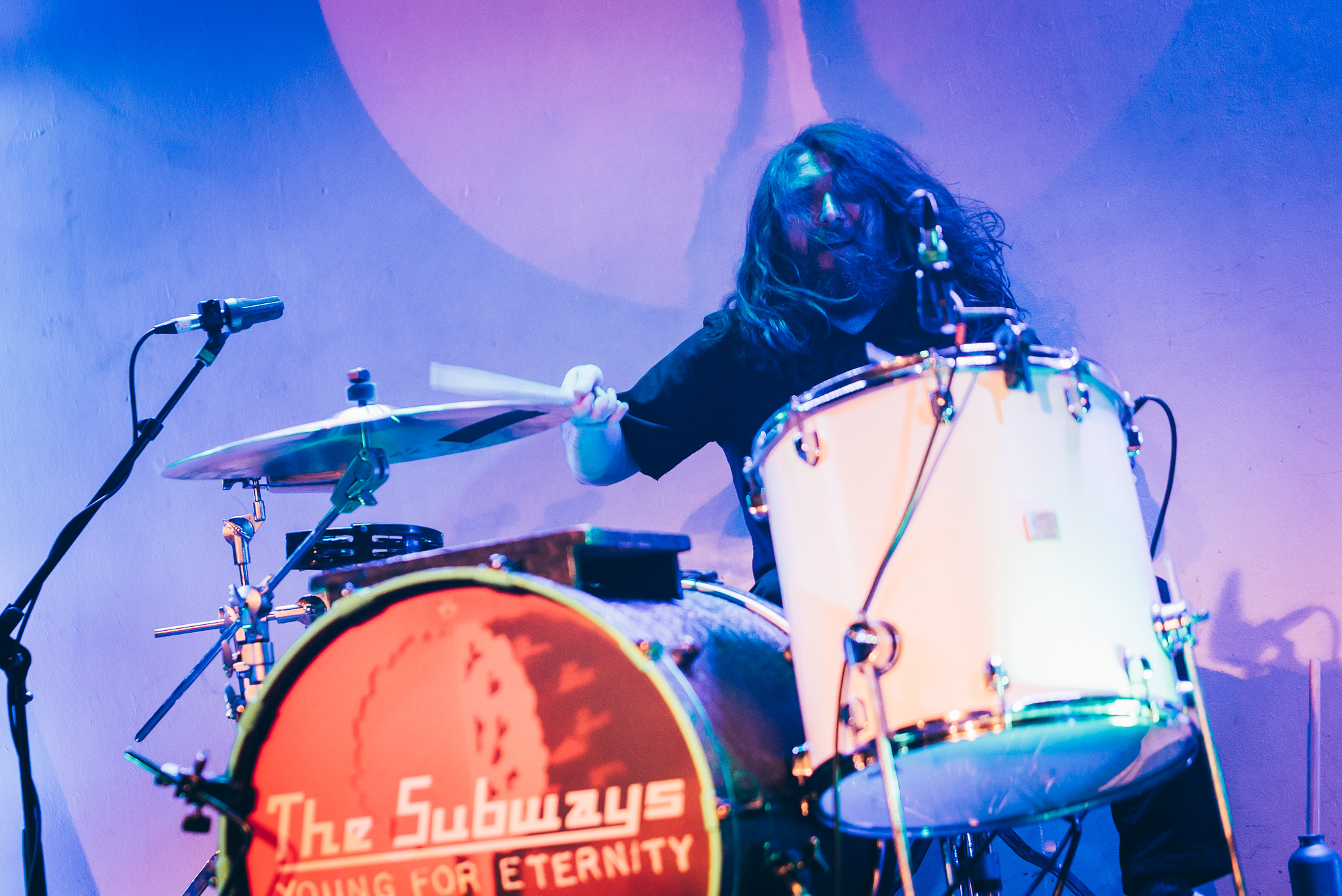
Former drummer Josh Morgan performing with the band

On 18 February 2008, the band recorded their live video at The Stoke Sugarmill for their first single, "Girls & Boys", which was released as a free download from their website on 25 March 2008. On 24 February 2008 in an exclusive interview found on www.sundaymail.co.uk, Lunn revealed he and Cooper split up in June during studio-sessions for The Subways' second album, All or Nothing. He went on to say that the break-up will not affect the band. They are both happy with their new partners. By 25 March 2008, The Subways had started their first UK-tour of the year and played at the Glastonbury Festival, T in the Park, Download Festival, Oxegen Festival, and Reading and Leeds Festival.

On 26 May 2008, the track "This is the Club" was released on the internet as part of a competition for fans to produce its video using 4 video clips. On 30 June 2008, All or Nothing was released, achieved with the help of producer Butch Vig. The band's song "Girls and Boys" was featured as the backing song for the television show The Riches on Virgin1. The band appeared as themselves in Guy Ritchie's film RocknRolla, performing "Rock & Roll Queen". The Song "I Won't Let You Down" is featured on the racing-game Colin McRae: DiRT 2. Rock and Roll Queen plays in Saints Row 2

The Subways perform three songs in episode 10 of Series 2 (2008) of Live From Abbey Road: "Oh Yeah" from Young for Eternity, and "Strawberry Blonde" and "I Won't Let You Down" from All or Nothing. On 18 March 2009, The Subways featured as themselves in the episode "Golden Lady" of the TV series FM.

The Subways played Australia's Soundwave festival tour in February and March, followed by Poland in April 2009. The song "Kalifornia" is featured on the video game Midnight Club: Los Angeles. On 26 June 2009, The Subways supported AC/DC at Wembley Stadium and Hampden Park on 30 June.

In 2009, the band played at the biggest open-air festival in Europe (400,000 - 500,000 rock fans every year) - Przystanek Woodstock in Poland. On 17 July they headlined and closed the fifth 2000 Trees Festival in the UK. On 31 July, The Subways headlined at the Y - Not Festival, near Matlock, Derbyshire. On 8 August 2010, they appeared at the Hevy Music Festival near Folkestone. In the same month, the Subways played in Lithuania's rock/metal music festival, Rocknights, in Zarasai.

=== Money and Celebrity (2010–2012) ===
In late 2010, the band announced they were recording their new album with producer Stephen Street. In June 2011, the first single from their new album, "It's a Party", was released as a free download through the band's website. A second single, "We Don't Need Money to Have a Good Time", followed on 11 September 2011. The Subways third studio album, Money and Celebrity, was released on 18 September.

The band later embarked on a European tour in support of the album, including shows at the Manchester Academy 2, London KOKO and Madrid Sala Caracol. At the end of October 2011, the band announced that they were playing at the KERRANG! Xmas Party in Birmingham Ballroom on 16 December 2011. The single "It's a Party" was released on 2 January 2012. A new European tour followed in the spring of 2012. On 21 April, the single "Kiss Kiss Bang Bang" was released.

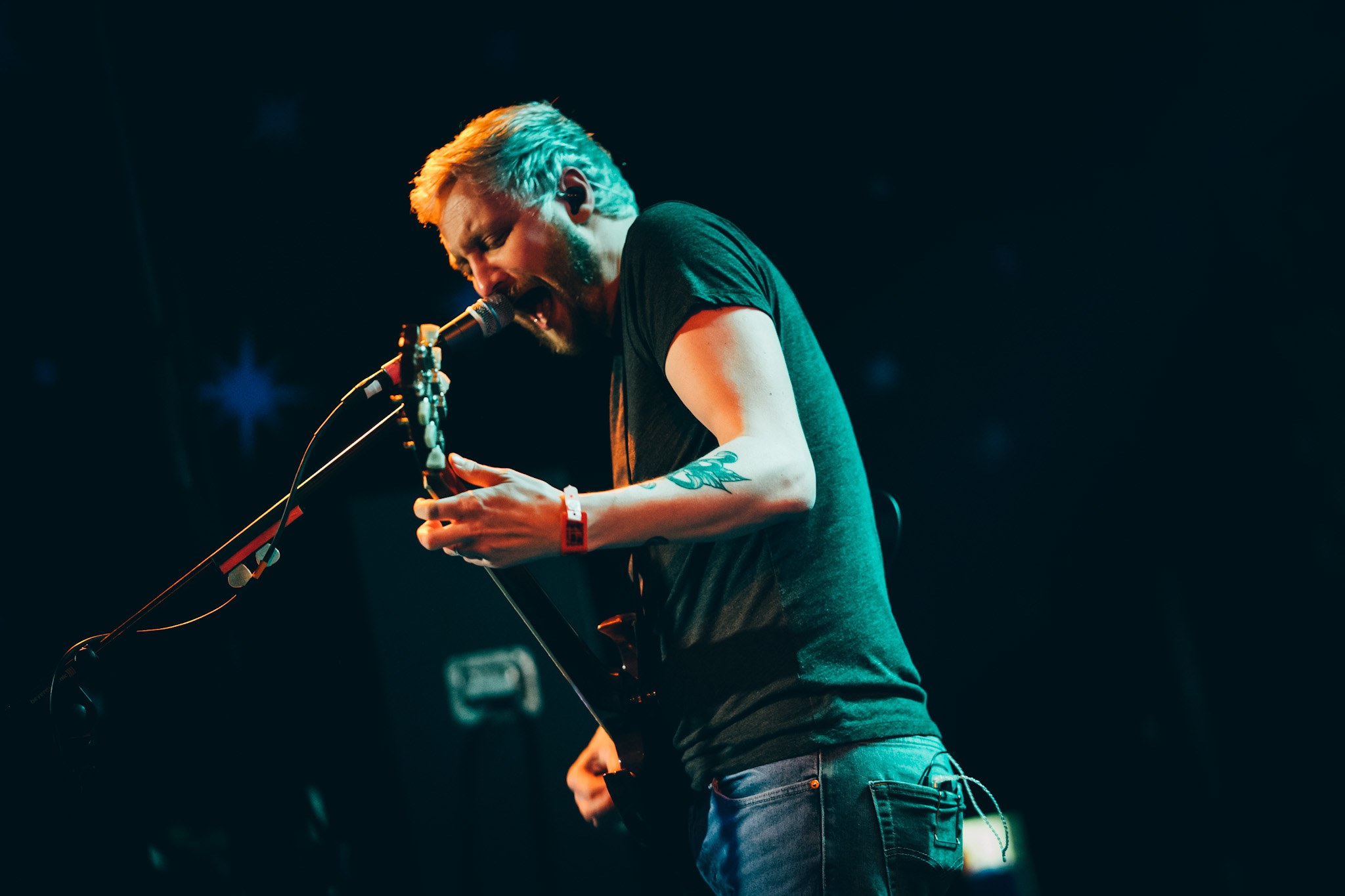
Billy Lunn with the band at Club 85 in 2020

On 13 August 2012, the band announced that they would be headlining the Propaganda Indie Club tour which would see them tour a total of twelve clubs throughout the United Kingdom between Saturday 22 September and Saturday 27 October. On 17 February 2013, the band announced that they had started rehearsing for their fourth album.

=== Self-titled album and Uncertain Joys (2014–present) ===
During spring 2014, the song "My Heart Is Pumping to a Brand-New Beat" was released, and tour-dates for later that year were announced. On 9 February 2015, the band's self-titled fourth album, The Subways, was released in the UK, four days after it was released in Germany and Switzerland.

On 16 February 2015, it was announced that drummer Josh Morgan was to temporarily leave the band after suffering from acute stage-fright caused by Asperger syndrome. A professional drummer and friend of the band was asked to take over from Morgan's position while he sought help for his condition. Morgan later rejoined the band on tour some weeks later.

On 25 September 2015, The Subways released the Good Times EP, featuring "Good Times" as the lead single, as well as four other live tracks recorded at the Open Air Gampel music festival in Switzerland. On 15 April 2016, the band released Acoustic Adventures at Yfe Studios, an EP of acoustic songs, including two cover versions.

On 2 December 2019, the band released a 15th anniversary edition of Young for Eternity and All or Nothing with previously unheard and unreleased material on CD, digital download, and limited vinyl editions. The release was followed by a special tour in 2020, playing the albums in full. On 19 October 2020, it was announced on The Subways' official Twitter account that founder and drummer, Josh Morgan, had left the band for family reasons. In 2021, drummer Camille Phillips joined the band. The Subways released their fifth studio album, Uncertain Joys, on 13 January 2023.

== Members ==
Current members

- Billy Lunn – vocals, guitar (2002–present)
- Charlotte Cooper – bass, vocals, keyboards (2002–present)
- Camille Phillips – drums (2021–present)

Former members

- Josh Morgan – drums (2002–2020)

== Discography ==
Studio albums

- Young for Eternity (2005)
- All or Nothing (2008)
- Money and Celebrity (2011)
- The Subways (2015)
- Uncertain Joys (2023)
