= Silversun Pickups discography =

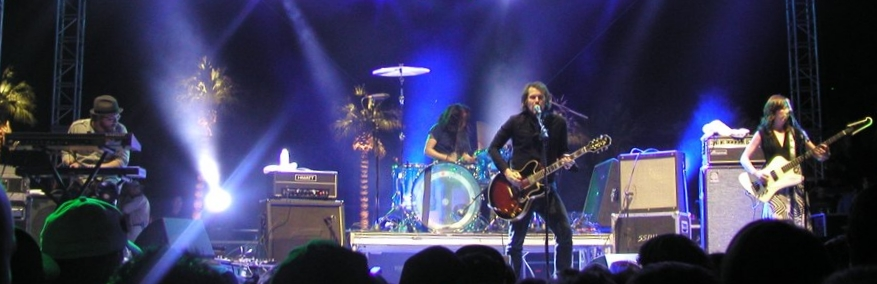
- Silversun Pickups at Coachella 2009.
- Studio albums: 7
- Extended plays: 7
- Singles: 29
- Music videos: 15
- No. 1 singles: 1

American alternative rock band Silversun Pickups has released seven studio albums and 30 singles.

== Albums ==
=== Studio albums ===
List of studio albums, with selected chart positions and sales shown
Title	Album details	Peak chart positions										Certifications
Title	Album details	US	US Alt.	US Ind.	US Rock	AUS	BEL (FL)	CAN	GER	UK	UK Ind.	Certifications
Carnavas	Released: July 25, 2006; Label: Dangerbird; Formats: CD, LP, DI	80	—	5	23	65	84	83	—	161	—	RIAA: Gold
Swoon	Released: April 14, 2009; Label: Dangerbird; Formats: CD, LP, DI	7	2	1	2	14	—	23	90	107	—	
Neck of the Woods	Released: May 8, 2012; Label: Dangerbird; Formats: CD, LP, DI, streaming	6	1	1	2	23	120	11	—	86	—	
Better Nature	Released: September 25, 2015; Label: New Machine; Formats: CD, LP, DI, streaming	16	3	2	3	22	—	21	—	—	29	
Widow's Weeds	Released: June 7, 2019; Label: New Machine; Formats: CD, LP, DI, streaming	83	5	2	12	— (Note: Widow's Weeds did not enter the ARIA Albums Chart, but peaked at number 24 on the ARIA Digital Album Chart.)	—	—	—	— (Note: Widow's Weeds did not enter the UK Albums Chart, but peaked at number 78 on the UK Albums Downloads Chart.)	23	
Physical Thrills	Released: August 19, 2022; Label: New Machine; Formats: CD, LP, DI, streaming	— (Note: Physical Thrills did not enter the US Billboard 200, but peaked at number 11 on the US Billboard Album Sales Chart.)	—	35	—	—	—	—	—	— (Note: Physical Thrills did not enter the UK Albums Chart, but peaked at number 99 on the UK Albums Sales Chart.)	33	
Tenterhooks	Scheduled: February 6, 2026; Label: New Machine; Formats: CD, LP, DI, streaming	— (Note: Tenterhooks did not enter the US Billboard 200, but peaked at number 25 on the US Billboard Album Sales Chart.)	—	—	—	—	—	—	—	— (Note: Tenterhooks did not enter the UK Albums Chart, but peaked at number 65 on the UK Album Downloads Chart.)	— (Note: Tenterhooks did not enter the UK Independent Albums Chart, but peaked at number 15 on the UK Independent Album Breakers Chart.)	
"—" denotes a release that did not chart.

=== Compilations ===
List of compilation albums, with selected chart positions
Title	Album details	Peak chart positions
Title	Album details	US Vinyl
The Singles Collection	Released: February 25, 2014; Label: Dangerbird; Formats: CD, LP, DI	6

== EPs ==
List of extended plays, with selected chart positions
Title	Album details	Peak chart positions
Title	Album details	US Dig.
Pikul	Released: July 26, 2005; Label: Dangerbird; Formats: CD, LP, DI	—
Live Session	Released: February 27, 2007; Label: Dangerbird; Formats: DI	23
The Tripwire Session: Live in Chicago	Released: February 27, 2007; Label: Dangerbird; Formats:	—
Remixes	Released: December 11, 2007; Label: Dangerbird; Formats: DI	—
Seasick	Released: November 25, 2011; Label: Dangerbird Records; Formats: CD, Vinyl, DI	—
Better Nature (Revisited)	Released: October 13, 2017; Label: New Machine Recordings; Formats: CD, Vinyl, DI	—
Acoustic Thrills	Released: June 16, 2023; Label: New Machine Recordings; Formats: DI	—

== Singles ==
Title	Year	Peak chart positions										Certifications	Album
Title	Year	US	US Rock	BEL (FL)	CAN	CAN Rock	CZR Rock	GER	MEX	SCO	UK Sales	Certifications	Album
"Kissing Families"	2006	—	×	—	—	—	—	—	×	—	—		Pikul
"Lazy Eye"	2007	— (Note: "Lazy Eye" did not enter the Billboard Hot 100, but peaked at number 2 on the Bubbling Under Hot 100 Singles chart, which acts as a 25-song extension to the Hot 100.)	× (Note: "Lazy Eye" did not enter the Hot Rock & Alternative Songs chart, which did not exist prior to 2009, but peaked at number five on the Alternative Airplay chart.)	56	44	7	—	—	×	73	55	RIAA: Platinum	Carnavas
"Future Foe Scenarios"	2007	—	×	72	—	—	—	—	×	—	89		Carnavas
"Well Thought Out Twinkles"	2007	—	× (Note: "Well Thought Out Twinkles" did not enter the Hot Rock & Alternative Songs chart, which did not exist prior to 2009, but peaked at number nine on the Alternative Airplay chart.)	—	—	34	—	—	×	54	46		Carnavas
"Little Lover's So Polite"	2008	—	×	—	—	—	—	—	×	—	—		Carnavas
"Panic Switch"	2009	92	4	—	86	10	18	73	28	—	—	RIAA: Gold	Swoon
"Substitution"	2009	—	26	—	—	29	—	—	22	—	—		Swoon
"The Royal We"	2010	—	21	—	—	25	—	—	—	—	—		Swoon
"Seasick"	2011	— (Note: "Seasick" did not enter the US Billboard 200, but peaked at number 6 on the Hot Singles Sales chart.)	—	—	—	—	—	—	—	—	—		Non-album single
"Bloody Mary (Nerve Endings)"	2012	—	16	99	—	24	—	—	28	—	—		Neck of the Woods
"The Pit"	2012	—	31	—	—	42	—	—	—	—	—		Neck of the Woods
"Dots and Dashes (Enough Already)"	2013	—	— (Note: "Dots and Dashes (Enough Already)" did not enter the Hot Rock & Alternative Songs chart, but peaked at number 30 on the Alternative Airplay chart.)	—	—	—	—	—	—	—	—		Neck of the Woods
"Let It Decay"	2013	— (Note: "Let It Decay" did not enter the US Billboard 200, but peaked at number 14 on the Hot Singles Sales chart.)	—	—	—	—	—	—	—	—	—		Non-album single
"Cannibal"	2014	—	— (Note: "Cannibal" did not enter the Hot Rock & Alternative Songs chart, but peaked at number 31 on the Rock & Alternative Airplay chart.)	—	—	28	—	—	44	—	—		The Singles Collection
"Nightlight"	2015	— (Note: "Nightlight" did not enter the US Billboard 200, but peaked at number 10 on the Hot Singles Sales chart.)	29	—	—	41	—	—	—	—	—		Better Nature
"Circadian Rhythm (Last Dance)"	2016	—	— (Note: "Circadian Rhythm (Last Dance)" did not enter the Hot Rock & Alternative Songs chart, but peaked at number 27 on the Rock & Alternative Airplay chart.)	—	—	46	—	—	—	—	—		Better Nature
"Latchkey Kids"	2016	—	— (Note: "Latchkey Kids" did not enter the Hot Rock & Alternative Songs chart, but peaked at number 33 on the Alternative Airplay chart.)	—	—	—	—	—	—	—	—		Better Nature
"It Doesn't Matter Why"	2019	—	40	—	—	—	—	—	—	—	—		Widow's Weeds
"Freakazoid"	2019	—	—	—	—	—	—	—	—	—	—		Widow's Weeds
"Don't Know Yet"	2019	—	— (Note: "Don't Know Yet" did not enter the Hot Rock & Alternative Songs chart, but peaked at number 22 on the Alternative Airplay chart.)	—	—	—	—	—	—	—	—		Widow's Weeds
"Toy Soldiers"	2020	—	— (Note: "Toy Soldiers" did not enter the Hot Rock & Alternative Songs chart, but peaked at number 30 on the Alternative Airplay chart.)	—	—	—	—	—	—	—	—		Non-album single
"Scared Together"	2022	—	— (Note: "Scared Together" did not enter the Hot Rock & Alternative Songs chart, but peaked at number 32 on the Rock & Alternative Airplay chart.)	—	—	41	—	—	—	—	—		Physical Thrills
"Alone on a Hill"	2022	—	—	—	—	—	—	—	—	—	—		Physical Thrills
"Just Like Christmas"	2022	—	—	—	—	—	—	—	—	—	—		Non-album single
"Empty Nest"	2023	—	— (Note: "Empty Nest" did not enter the Hot Rock & Alternative Songs chart, but peaked at number 42 on the Rock & Alternative Airplay chart.)	—	—	—	—	—	—	—	—		Physical Thrills
"I'm the Man"	2023	—	—	—	—	—	—	—	—	—	—		Non-album singles
"Move on Fast"	2023	—	—	—	—	—	—	—	—	—	—		Non-album singles
"The Wreckage"	2025	—	— (Note: "The Wreckage" did not enter the Hot Rock & Alternative Songs chart, but peaked at number 38 on the Rock & Alternative Airplay chart.)	—	—	—	—	—	—	—	—		Tenterhooks
"New Wave"	2025	—	—	—	—	—	—	—	—	—	—		Tenterhooks
"Long Gone"	2026	—	—	—	—	—	—	—	—	—	—		Tenterhooks
"—" denotes a release that did not chart. "×" denotes periods where charts did not exist or were not archived.

== Other charted songs ==
Title	Year	Peak chart positions			Album
Title	Year	US Alt.	CAN Rock	MEX	Album
"There's No Secrets This Year"	2009	—	—	16	Swoon
"Broken Bottles"	2011	32	50	—	"Seasick" single
"—" denotes a recording that did not chart or was not released in that territory.

== Music videos ==
Year	Song	Director(s)
2006	"Kissing Families"	Suzie Vlcek
2006	"Lazy Eye"	Suzie Vlcek
2007	"Well Thought Out Twinkles"	Philip Andelman
2008	"Little Lover's So Polite"	Joaquin Phoenix
2009	"Panic Switch"	James K. Frost
2009	"Substitution"	The Malloys
2010	"The Royal We"	Matt Mahurin
2012	"Bloody Mary (Nerve Endings)"	James K. Frost
2013	"Dots and Dashes (Enough Already)"	Suzie Vlcek
2014	"Cannibal"	Suzie Vlcek
2015	"Nightlight"	Mark Pellington
2016	"Circadian Rhythm (Last Dance)"	Suzie Vlcek
2016	"Latchkey Kids"	Maryam L'Ange
2019	"It Doesn't Matter Why"	Suzie Vlcek
2019	"Don't Know Yet"	Alan Del Rio Ortiz
2020	"Toy Soldiers"	Clarie Marie Vogel, Aaron Hymes
2022	"Scared Together"	Clarie Marie Vogel
2022	"Alone on a Hill"	Suzie Vlcek
2022	"Hereafter (Way After)"	Lana Shaw
2022	"Hidden Moon"	Senon Williams
2022	"System Error"	Michael Feerick
2023	"David Lynch Has a Painting Made of Flies Eyes"	Pila Boyd
2023	"Empty Nest"	Suzie Vlcek
2025	"The Wreckage"	Suzie Vlcek
2026	"Long Gone"	Suzie Vlcek
