= The Singles Collection (Silversun Pickups album) =

Compilation album by Silversun Pickups
- Released: February 25, 2014
- Recorded: 2005–2013
- Genre: Alternative rock; indie rock; shoegazing; dream pop; post-punk revival
- Length: 53:58
- Label: Dangerbird
- Producer: Rod Cevera; Dave Cooley; Jacknife Lee

Silversun Pickups chronology
Neck of the Woods (2012)	The Singles Collection (2014)	Better Nature (2015)

Singles from The Singles Collection
- 1. "Cannibal" Released: January 3, 2014

Professional ratings
Review scores
Source	Rating
PopMatters	7/10

The Singles Collection is a compilation album by the American alternative rock band Silversun Pickups. It was released on February 25, 2014 through Dangerbird Records in North America. The album was released on regular digital and CD formats and includes one new song, "Cannibal". A limited edition vinyl box-set contained six 7-inch records and an additional extra track "Devil's Cup" originally from the Swoon album sessions.

== Track listing ==
All tracks are written by Silversun Pickups.

No.	Title	Album	Length
1.	"Kissing Families"	Pikul (EP)	4:50
2.	"Lazy Eye"	Carnavas	5:54
3.	"Well Thought Out Twinkles"	Carnavas	4:02
4.	"Little Lover's So Polite"	Carnavas	4:58
5.	"Panic Switch"	Swoon	5:43
6.	"Substitution"	Swoon	4:41
7.	"The Royal We"	Swoon	4:47
8.	"Bloody Mary (Nerve Endings)"	Neck of the Woods	5:10
9.	"The Pit"	Neck of the Woods	4:41
10.	"Dots and Dashes (Enough Already)"	Neck of the Woods	5:08
11.	"Cannibal"	Previously unreleased	3:44

Vinyl boxset only
No.	Title	Album	Length
12.	"Devil's Cup"	Previously unreleased	3:02

== Personnel ==
Silversun Pickups

- Brian Aubert – lead vocals, guitar
- Nikki Monninger – bass guitar, backing vocals
- Joe Lester – keyboards, samples, sound manipulation
- Chris Guanlao – drums, percussion

Additional musicians

- Tanya Haden – cello on track 1
- Jacknife Lee – additional keyboards on tracks 8–10
