= List of songs in Guitar Hero World Tour =

Guitar Hero World Tour is the fourth major release in the Guitar Hero series of music video games, a series that has sold over 24 million units and earned more than $1.6 billion in retail sales. The game was released in October 2008 for the PlayStation 2, PlayStation 3, Wii, and Xbox 360 game consoles in North America, and a month later for PAL regions. It was released in Europe and on a limited basis in North America for the Microsoft Windows and Apple Macintosh platforms. The game was developed by Neversoft, with assistance from Vicarious Visions and Budcat Creations for the Wii and PlayStation 2 versions, respectively, and distributed by RedOctane and Activision. Guitar Hero World Tour, like the other games in the Guitar Hero series, focuses on the use of special game controllers to mimic musical tracks from popular rock songs that date from the 1960s to contemporary hits. While previous versions of the series have only used a guitar-based controller for lead and bass guitar tracks, World Tour adds in drums and vocals, allowing up to four players to create a virtual band. For each instrument, the player scores points by matching controller actions with note gems on the game screen to avoid a bad performance that may end the song prematurely. In addition to the on-disk songs, the PlayStation 3, Xbox 360, and Wii versions support the ability to obtain new songs through downloadable content. A new music creation system also allows users on the same systems to gain new user-created songs through the game's "GHTunes" service.

== Main setlist ==
The game disc contains 86 songs, all of which are master recordings—a first for the Guitar Hero series. In the single player and multiplayer band (Career Mode) modes, songs are distributed into various "gigs" that contain between 3 and 6 songs each; gigs may also contain a boss battle (for the single player guitar career) and encores that are revealed once all the other songs in the gig are completed. These gigs are arranged approximately based on the difficulty of the songs in that gig for the selected instrument or band, with more difficult songs appearing in later gigs. The player or band must complete easier gigs before the more difficult gigs are available. Once a player or band has access to a song via any instrument or band Career mode, that song can be played in Quickplay mode or any of the other competitive modes in the game. The set list has been described as containing well-known songs by "an impressive collection of artists" such as Van Halen, Jimi Hendrix, Joe Satriani, and Tool, as well as a considerable number of tracks from European bands. below with the year they were recorded (based on the in-game description), song title, and artist, and the placement of the song in the band career mode. 37 out of the 86 songs are exportable to both Guitar Hero 5 and Band Hero for a small fee, with music licensing limiting which songs can be exported.

Year	Song	Artist	Guitar Tour Venue	Band Tour Venue	Exportable?
1994	"About a Girl" (Unplugged Live)	Nirvana	1. Phi Psi Kappa (USA)	1. House of Blues (Los Angeles)	Yes
2007	"Aggro"	The Enemy	11. Ted's Tiki Hut (Tahiti)	11. Ted's Tiki Hut (Tahiti)	No
1970	"American Woman"	The Guess Who	9. Strutter's Farm (Kentucky)	10. Rock Brigade (The Pacific)	No
1980	"Antisocial"	Trust	16. Ozzfest (Germany)	17. Times Square (New York City)	No
1993	"Are You Gonna Go My Way"	Lenny Kravitz	14. AT&T Park (San Francisco)	9. Strutter's Farm (Kentucky)	Yes
2006	"Assassin"	Muse	14. AT&T Park (San Francisco)	17. Times Square (New York City)	No
2005	"B.Y.O.B."	System of a Down	17. Times Square (New York City)	17. Times Square (New York City); Encore	No
1973	"Band on the Run"	Wings	4. Pang Tang Bay (Hong Kong)	3. Pang Tang Bay (Hong Kong); Encore	Yes
1982	"Beat It"	Michael Jackson	12. Will Heilm's Keep (England); Encore	9. Strutter's Farm (Kentucky)	No
1997	"Beautiful Disaster"	311	2. Wilted Orchid (Sweden)	4. Bone Church (Poland)	No
1980	"Crazy Train"	Ozzy Osbourne	16. Ozzfest (Germany); Encore	16. Ozzfest (Germany); Encore	No
1997	"Dammit"	Blink-182	8. Rock Brigade (The Pacific)	10. Rock Brigade (The Pacific)	Yes
2005	"Demolition Man" (Live)	Sting	12. Will Heilm's Keep (England)	12. Will Heilm's Keep (England)	Yes
1972	"Do It Again"	Steely Dan	7. Swamp Shack (Louisiana)	5. Swamp Shack (Louisiana)	Yes
1984	"Escuela de Calor"	Radio Futura	14. AT&T Park (San Francisco)	12. Will Heilm's Keep (England)	No
1997	"Everlong"	Foo Fighters	8. Rock Brigade (The Pacific); Encore	14. AT&T Park (San Francisco)	Yes
1982	"Eye of the Tiger"	Survivor	7. Swamp Shack (Louisiana)	2. Phi Psi Kappa (USA); Encore	No
1994	"Feel the Pain"	Dinosaur Jr.	8. Rock Brigade (The Pacific)	4. Bone Church (Poland)	No
2004	"Float On"	Modest Mouse	13. Recording Studio (Canada)	11. Ted's Tiki Hut (Tahiti)	No
1998	"Freak on a Leash"	Korn	5. Amoeba Records (Los Angeles)	8. Wilted Orchid (Sweden)	No
1977	"Go Your Own Way"	Fleetwood Mac	9. Strutter's Farm (Kentucky)	9. Strutter's Farm (Kentucky); Encore	No
2007	"Good God"	Anouk	11. Ted's Tiki Hut (Tahiti)	15. Tesla's Coil (Australia)	No
2008	"Hail to the Freaks"	Beatsteaks	15. Tesla's Coil (Australia)	13. Recording Studio (Canada)	No
1979	"Heartbreaker"	Pat Benatar	9. Strutter's Farm (Kentucky)	9. Strutter's Farm (Kentucky)	Yes
1995	"Hey Man, Nice Shot"	Filter	8. Rock Brigade (The Pacific)	10. Rock Brigade (The Pacific)	No
1978	"Hollywood Nights"	Bob Seger & The Silver Bullet Band	15. Tesla's Coil (Australia)	15. Tesla's Coil (Australia)	Yes
1984	"Hot for Teacher"	Van Halen	17. Times Square (New York City); Encore	17. Times Square (New York City)	No
1976	"Hotel California"	Eagles	5. Amoeba Records (Los Angeles); Encore	5. Swamp Shack (Louisiana); Encore	No
1973	"The Joker"	Steve Miller Band	5. Amoeba Records (Los Angeles)	3. Pang Tang Bay (Hong Kong)	Yes
2008^{a}	"Kick Out the Jams"	MC5's Wayne Kramer	10. House of Blues (Los Angeles)	12. Will Heilm's Keep (England)	No
2005	"The Kill"	Thirty Seconds to Mars	12. Will Heilm's Keep (England)	14. AT&T Park (San Francisco)	Yes
2005	"L'Via L'Viaquez"	The Mars Volta	10. House of Blues (Los Angeles)	14. AT&T Park (San Francisco)	Yes
1987	"La Bamba"	Los Lobos	17. Times Square (New York City)	17. Times Square (New York City)	No
2006	"Lazy Eye"	Silversun Pickups	13. Recording Studio (Canada)	13. Recording Studio (Canada)	Yes
1986	"Livin' on a Prayer"	Bon Jovi	1. Phi Psi Kappa (USA)	7. Amoeba Records (Los Angeles)	Yes
1967	"Love Me Two Times"	The Doors	10. House of Blues (Los Angeles); Encore	10. Rock Brigade (The Pacific)	No
1987	"Love Removal Machine"	The Cult	16. Ozzfest (Germany)	8. Wilted Orchid (Sweden); Encore	No
1994	"Love Spreads"	The Stone Roses	18. Sunna's Chariot (Asgard)	18. Sunna's Chariot (Asgard)	Yes
2001	"The Middle"	Jimmy Eat World	8. Rock Brigade (The Pacific)	8. Wilted Orchid (Sweden)	Yes
2007	"Misery Business"	Paramore	5. Amoeba Records (Los Angeles)	7. Amoeba Records (Los Angeles)	No
2005	"Monsoon"	Tokio Hotel	11. Ted's Tiki Hut (Tahiti)	11. Ted's Tiki Hut (Tahiti)	No
1988	"Mountain Song"	Jane's Addiction	1. Phi Psi Kappa (USA); Encore	8. Wilted Orchid (Sweden)	No
1980	"Mr. Crowley"	Ozzy Osbourne	16. Ozzfest (Germany)	16. Ozzfest (Germany)	No
2005	"Never Too Late"	The Answer	18. Sunna's Chariot (Asgard)	18. Sunna's Chariot (Asgard)	Yes
1986	"No Sleep Till Brooklyn"	Beastie Boys featuring Kerry King	4. Pang Tang Bay (Hong Kong); Encore	1. House of Blues (Los Angeles)	Yes
2006	"Nuvole E Lenzuola"	Negramaro	13. Recording Studio (Canada)	13. Recording Studio (Canada)	No
2002	"Obstacle 1"	Interpol	2. Wilted Orchid (Sweden)	7. Amoeba Records (Los Angeles); Encore	Yes
1980	"On the Road Again" (Live)	Willie Nelson	10. House of Blues (Los Angeles)	5. Swamp Shack (Louisiana)	No
2000	"One Armed Scissor"	At the Drive-In	11. Ted's Tiki Hut (Tahiti)	15. Tesla's Coil (Australia)	Yes
1987	"The One I Love"	R.E.M.	2. Wilted Orchid (Sweden); Encore	3. Pang Tang Bay (Hong Kong)	No
1978	"One Way or Another"	Blondie	7. Swamp Shack (Louisiana)	7. Amoeba Records (Los Angeles)	Yes
2006	"Our Truth"	Lacuna Coil	16. Ozzfest (Germany)	16. Ozzfest (Germany)	Yes
2008^{b}	"Overkill"	Motörhead	17. Times Square (New York City)	16. Ozzfest (Germany)	Yes
2002	"Parabola"	Tool	6. Tool (USA)	6. Tool (USA)	No
2007^{b}	"Pretty Vacant"	Sex Pistols	13. Recording Studio (Canada)	13. Recording Studio (Canada)	No
1998	"Prisoner of Society"	The Living End	16. Ozzfest (Germany)	16. Ozzfest (Germany)	No
1992	"Pull Me Under"	Dream Theater	18. Sunna's Chariot (Asgard)	18. Sunna's Chariot (Asgard)	No
1968	"Purple Haze" (Live)	The Jimi Hendrix Experience	14. AT&T Park (San Francisco); Encore	14. AT&T Park (San Francisco); Encore	No
1973	"Ramblin' Man"	The Allman Brothers Band	9. Strutter's Farm (Kentucky)	7. Amoeba Records (Los Angeles)	No
2008	"Re-Education (Through Labor)"	Rise Against	17. Times Square (New York City)	17. Times Square (New York City)	Yes
1984	"Rebel Yell"	Billy Idol	12. Will Heilm's Keep (England)	8. Wilted Orchid (Sweden)	No
2006	"Rooftops (A Liberation Broadcast)"	Lostprophets	11. Ted's Tiki Hut (Tahiti)	11. Ted's Tiki Hut (Tahiti)	No
1996	"Santeria"	Sublime	10. House of Blues (Los Angeles)	12. Will Heilm's Keep (England)	Yes
1987	"Satch Boogie"	Joe Satriani	18. Sunna's Chariot (Asgard)	18. Sunna's Chariot (Asgard)	No
2001	"Schism"	Tool	6. Tool (USA)	6. Tool (USA)	No
2008	"Scream Aim Fire"	Bullet for My Valentine	17. Times Square (New York City)	16. Ozzfest (Germany)	No
2000	"Shiver"	Coldplay	12. Will Heilm's Keep (England)	12. Will Heilm's Keep (England); Encore	Yes
1995	"Some Might Say"	Oasis	3. Bone Church (Poland)	2. Phi Psi Kappa (USA)	No
1992	"Soul Doubt"	NOFX	15. Tesla's Coil (Australia)	18. Sunna's Chariot (Asgard)	Yes
1995	"Spiderwebs"	No Doubt	7. Swamp Shack (Louisiana)	10. Rock Brigade (The Pacific); Encore	Yes
2003	"Stillborn"	Black Label Society	7. Swamp Shack (Louisiana); Encore	5. Swamp Shack (Louisiana)	Yes
1975	"Stranglehold"	Ted Nugent	9. Strutter's Farm (Kentucky); Encore	9. Strutter's Farm (Kentucky)	Yes
1973	"Sweet Home Alabama" (Live)	Lynyrd Skynyrd	14. AT&T Park (San Francisco)	14. AT&T Park (San Francisco)	Yes
2008	"Ted Nugent Guitar Duel"	Ted Nugent	9. Strutter's Farm (Kentucky)	N/A^{c}	Yes
1993	"Today"	The Smashing Pumpkins	3. Bone Church (Poland)	4. Bone Church (Poland)	Yes
2007	"Too Much, Too Young, Too Fast"	Airbourne	13. Recording Studio (Canada)	11. Ted's Tiki Hut (Tahiti)	No
2006	"Toy Boy"	Stuck in the Sound	15. Tesla's Coil (Australia)	13. Recording Studio (Canada)	Yes
1984	"Trapped Under Ice"	Metallica	17. Times Square (New York City)	17. Times Square (New York City)	No
1970	"Up Around the Bend"	Creedence Clearwater Revival	4. Pang Tang Bay (Hong Kong)	2. Phi Psi Kappa (USA)	Yes
2006	"Vicarious"	Tool	6. Tool (USA)	6. Tool (USA)	No
2002	"VinterNoll2"	Kent	15. Tesla's Coil (Australia)	15. Tesla's Coil (Australia)	No
2007	"Weapon of Choice"	Black Rebel Motorcycle Club	18. Sunna's Chariot (Asgard)	15. Tesla's Coil (Australia)	No
2007	"What I've Done"	Linkin Park	3. Bone Church (Poland); Encore	1. House of Blues (Los Angeles); Encore	No
1967	"The Wind Cries Mary"	The Jimi Hendrix Experience	14. AT&T Park (San Francisco)	14. AT&T Park (San Francisco)	No
2006	"You're Gonna Say Yeah!"	HushPuppies	4. Pang Tang Bay (Hong Kong)	4. Bone Church (Poland); Encore	Yes
2008	"Zakk Wylde Guitar Duel"	Zakk Wylde	7. Swamp Shack (Louisiana)	N/A^{c}	Yes

^a Instruments for this song were rerecorded in 2008, but the original 1968 vocal track is still used.

^b These songs were rerecorded by the original artist for use in the game.

^c Guitar duels are not available for band play unless downloaded from the online store and are not part of the band career path.

== Downloadable content ==
In addition to custom songs, players of the Xbox 360, PlayStation 3, and Wii versions could download new licensed songs for the game. However, on March 31, 2014, Activision removed this content from being downloadable and never became available again.

This was the first game in the Guitar Hero series to support download functionality on the Wii. Wii users can store downloaded songs on either the Wii's internal memory or on an SD card in a "Rock Archive". When playing tracks stored on an SD card, each song is automatically copied to a 200-memory block "content cache" on the Wii's flash memory for play and then deleted after the song is finished. Some downloadable content was not available for the Wii due to technical or licensing issues until November 24, 2009. Except for the Jimi Hendrix songs, the downloadable content is forward-compatible with Guitar Hero 5, Band Hero and Guitar Hero: Warriors of Rock, automatically updated to include new features found in those games.

Downloadable songs were available for individual purchase on PlayStation 3, Wii and Xbox 360, with a limited number of songs available free of charge. Also, users could purchase track packs of three songs. The Jimi Hendrix Track Pack was originally only available for download as a track pack and not as individual songs, but Activision announced that in March the Wii would receive the Hendrix pack as downloadable singles. These songs have since been released with the second Jimi Hendrix Track Pack.

Year	Song title	Artist	Genre	Pack name	Release date	Forward compatible with GH5/BH
2008	"That Was Just Your Life"^{+}	Metallica	Metal	Death Magnetic	Sept. 12, 2008^{d}	Yes
2008	"The End of the Line"^{+}	Metallica	Metal	Death Magnetic	Sept. 12, 2008^{d}	Yes
2008	"Broken, Beat & Scarred"^{+}	Metallica	Metal	Death Magnetic	Sept. 12, 2008	Yes
2008	"The Day That Never Comes"^{+}	Metallica	Metal	Death Magnetic	Sept. 12, 2008^{d}	Yes
2008	"All Nightmare Long"^{+}	Metallica	Metal	Death Magnetic	Sept. 12, 2008^{d}	Yes
2008	"Cyanide"^{+}	Metallica	Metal	Death Magnetic	Sept. 12, 2008	Yes
2008	"The Unforgiven III"	Metallica	Metal	Death Magnetic	Sept. 12, 2008^{d}	Yes
2008	"The Judas Kiss"^{+}	Metallica	Metal	Death Magnetic	Sept. 12, 2008^{d}	Yes
2008	"Suicide & Redemption J.H."^{+}	Metallica	Metal	Death Magnetic	Sept. 12, 2008^{d}	Yes
2008	"Suicide & Redemption K.H."^{+}	Metallica	Metal	Death Magnetic	Sept. 12, 2008^{d}	Yes
2008	"My Apocalypse"^{+}	Metallica	Metal	Death Magnetic	Sept. 12, 2008	Yes
1976	"Rock and Roll Band"	Boston	Classic Rock	Classic Rock Track Pack	Oct. 23, 2008	Yes
1978	"Hot Blooded"	Foreigner	Classic Rock	Classic Rock Track Pack	Oct. 23, 2008	Yes
1981	"Jessie's Girl" (Cover)	Rick Springfield	Pop Rock	Classic Rock Track Pack	Oct. 23, 2008	Yes
1992	"No Rain"	Blind Melon	Alternative	Single	Oct. 23, 2008	Yes
2008	"Ted Nugent Guitar Duel" (Co-Op)	Ted Nugent	Rock	Boss Battle Track Pack	Oct. 23, 2008^{a}	Yes
2008	"Zakk Wylde Guitar Duel" (Co-Op)	Zakk Wylde	Rock	Boss Battle Track Pack	Oct. 23, 2008^{a}	Yes
2008	"Anything"^{+}	An Endless Sporadic	Prog Rock	Neversoft Track Pack	Oct. 23, 2008^{a}	Yes
2008	"Electro Rock"^{+}	Sworn	Electronic	Neversoft Track Pack	Oct. 23, 2008^{a}	Yes
2008	"Horse to Water"	R.E.M.	Alternative	R.E.M. Track Pack	Oct. 30, 2008	Yes
2008	"Man-Sized Wreath"	R.E.M.	Alternative	R.E.M. Track Pack	Oct. 30, 2008	Yes
2008	"Supernatural Superserious"	R.E.M.	Alternative	R.E.M. Track Pack	Oct. 30, 2008	Yes
2008	"Bag It Up"	Oasis	Rock	Oasis Track Pack	Nov. 6, 2008^{b}	Yes
2008	"Waiting for the Rapture"	Oasis	Rock	Oasis Track Pack	Nov. 6, 2008^{b}	Yes
2008	"The Shock of the Lightning"	Oasis	Rock	Oasis Track Pack	Nov. 6, 2008^{b}	Yes
2007	"Another Way to Die"	Jack White & Alicia Keys	Blues Rock	Single	Nov. 7, 2008	Yes
1967	"If 6 Was 9"	Jimi Hendrix	Classic Rock	The Jimi Hendrix Track Pack	Nov. 13, 2008	No
1967	"Little Wing"	Jimi Hendrix	Classic Rock	The Jimi Hendrix Track Pack	Nov. 13, 2008	No
1969	"Fire (Live at Woodstock)"	Jimi Hendrix	Classic Rock	The Jimi Hendrix Track Pack	Nov. 13, 2008	No
2006	"Salute Your Solution"	The Raconteurs	Blues Rock	The Raconteurs Track Pack	Nov. 20, 2008	Yes
2008	"Hold Up"	The Raconteurs	Blues Rock	The Raconteurs Track Pack	Nov. 20, 2008	Yes
2008	"Consoler of the Lonely"	The Raconteurs	Blues Rock	The Raconteurs Track Pack	Nov. 20, 2008	Yes
2004	"Mr. Brightside"	The Killers	Alternative	The Killers Track Pack	Nov. 25, 2008	Yes
2008	"Losing Touch"	The Killers	Alternative	The Killers Track Pack	Nov. 25, 2008	Yes
2008	"Human"	The Killers	Alternative	The Killers Track Pack	Nov. 25, 2008	Yes
2008	"G.L.O.W."	The Smashing Pumpkins	Alternative	The Smashing Pumpkins Track Pack	Dec. 4, 2008	Yes
1995	"1979"	The Smashing Pumpkins	Alternative	The Smashing Pumpkins Track Pack	Dec. 4, 2008	Yes
1999	"The Everlasting Gaze"^{+}	The Smashing Pumpkins	Alternative	The Smashing Pumpkins Track Pack	Dec. 4, 2008	Yes
2002	"You Know You're Right"	Nirvana	Grunge	Nirvana Track Pack	Dec. 11, 2008	Yes
1990	"Sliver"	Nirvana	Grunge	Nirvana Track Pack	Dec. 11, 2008	Yes
1989	"Negative Creep"^{+}	Nirvana	Grunge	Nirvana Track Pack	Dec. 11, 2008	Yes
2006	"'54, '74, '90, 2010"	Sportfreunde Stiller	Pop Rock	European Track Pack 01	Dec. 11, 2008	Yes
2007	"Dis-Moi"	BB Brunes	Rock	European Track Pack 01	Dec. 11, 2008	Yes
2008	"Mama Maè"	Negrita	Rock	European Track Pack 01	Dec. 11, 2008	Yes
2007	"Frail Grasp on the Big Picture"	Eagles	Rock	Eagles Track Pack	Dec. 18, 2008	Yes
1976	"Life in the Fast Lane"	Eagles	Classic Rock	Eagles Track Pack	Dec. 18, 2008	Yes
1975	"One of These Nights"	Eagles	Classic Rock	Eagles Track Pack	Dec. 18, 2008	Yes
2007	"Jimi"	Slightly Stoopid	Surf Rock	Reggae Rock Track Pack	Dec. 23, 2008^{a}	Yes
2006	"Your Face"	Pepper	Surf Rock	Reggae Rock Track Pack	Dec. 23, 2008^{a}	Yes
2004	"Sacrifice"	Expendables	Surf Rock	Reggae Rock Track Pack	Dec. 23, 2008^{a}	Yes
2008	"Use Me"	Hinder	Hard Rock	Hard Rock Track Pack	Dec. 23, 2008	Yes
2003	"Because of You"^{+}	Nickelback	Hard Rock	Hard Rock Track Pack	Dec. 23, 2008	Yes
2008	"Light It Up"	Rev Theory	Hard Rock	Hard Rock Track Pack	Dec. 23, 2008	Yes
2008	"Degenerated"	Backyard Babies	Hard Rock	European Track Pack 02	Dec. 30, 2008	Yes
2006	"Por la Boca Vive el Pez"	Fito & Fitipaldis	Blues Rock	European Track Pack 02	Dec. 30, 2008	Yes
2007	"Johnny"	Di-rect	Pop Rock	European Track Pack 02	Dec. 30, 2008	Yes
2006	"Me and My Gang"	Rascal Flatts	Country	Country Rock Track Pack	Jan. 8, 2009	Yes
2007	"Ticks"	Brad Paisley	Country	Country Rock Track Pack	Jan. 8, 2009	Yes
2005	"Hillbilly Deluxe (song)"	Brooks & Dunn	Country	Country Rock Track Pack	Jan. 8, 2009	Yes
1999	"What's My Age Again?"	Blink-182	Pop Punk	Travis Barker Track Pack	Jan. 15, 2009	Yes
2006	"Lycanthrope"	+44	Pop Punk	Travis Barker Track Pack	Jan. 15, 2009	Yes
2008	"Low" (Travis Barker Remix)	Flo Rida featuring T-Pain	Hip-Hop	Travis Barker Track Pack	Jan. 15, 2009	Yes
1995	"Tomorrow"	Silverchair	Alternative	Australian Rock Track Pack	Jan. 22, 2009	Yes
2006	"Dimension"	Wolfmother	Hard Rock	Australian Rock Track Pack	Jan. 22, 2009	Yes
2002	"Outtathaway!"	The Vines	Indie Rock	Australian Rock Track Pack	Jan. 22, 2009	Yes
1975	"Born to Run"	Bruce Springsteen	Classic Rock	Bruce Springsteen Pack	Jan. 27, 2009	Yes
2008	"My Lucky Day"	Bruce Springsteen	Rock	Bruce Springsteen Pack	Jan. 27, 2009	Yes
2008	"The Turning"	Oasis	Rock	Dig Out Your Soul	Jan. 29, 2009	Yes
2008	"I'm Outta Time"	Oasis	Rock	Dig Out Your Soul	Jan. 29, 2009	Yes
2008	"(Get Off Your) High Horse Lady"	Oasis	Rock	Dig Out Your Soul	Jan. 29, 2009	Yes
2008	"Falling Down"	Oasis	Rock	Dig Out Your Soul	Jan. 29, 2009	Yes
2008	"To Be Where There's Life"	Oasis	Rock	Dig Out Your Soul	Jan. 29, 2009	Yes
2008	"Ain't Got Nothin'"	Oasis	Rock	Dig Out Your Soul	Jan. 29, 2009	Yes
2008	"The Nature of Reality"	Oasis	Rock	Dig Out Your Soul	Jan. 29, 2009	Yes
2008	"Soldier On"	Oasis	Rock	Dig Out Your Soul	Jan. 29, 2009	Yes
1969	"Commotion"	Creedence Clearwater Revival	Southern Rock	Southern Rock Track Pack	Feb. 05, 2009	Yes
2008	"Black Betty"	Ram Jam	Southern Rock	Southern Rock Track Pack	Feb. 05, 2009^{c}	Yes
2008	"Gimme All Your Lovin'"	ZZ Top	Blues Rock	Southern Rock Track Pack	Feb. 05, 2009^{c}	Yes
2001	"New Slang"	The Shins	Indie Rock	Acoustic Track Pack	Feb. 12, 2009	Yes
1999	"Drive"	Incubus	Surf Rock	Acoustic Track Pack	Feb. 12, 2009	Yes
2004	"Wonderwall"	Ryan Adams	Indie Rock	Acoustic Track Pack	Feb. 12, 2009	Yes
1973	"Jet"	Wings	Classic Rock	Wings Track Pack	Feb. 19, 2009	Yes
1972	"Hi Hi Hi"	Wings	Classic Rock	Wings Track Pack	Feb. 19, 2009	Yes
1974	"Junior's Farm"	Wings	Classic Rock	Wings Track Pack	Feb. 19, 2009	Yes
1978	"Old Time Rock and Roll"	Bob Seger & the Silver Bullet Band	Classic Rock	Bob Seger Track Pack	Feb. 26, 2009	Yes
1980	"Her Strut"	Bob Seger & the Silver Bullet Band	Classic Rock	Bob Seger Track Pack	Feb. 26, 2009	Yes
2008	"Get Out of Denver"	Bob Seger	Classic Rock	Bob Seger Track Pack	Feb. 26, 2009	Yes
2007	"Break It Out"	Vanilla Sky	Pop Rock	European Track Pack 03	Mar. 5, 2009	Yes
2003	"In the Shadows"	The Rasmus	Pop Rock	European Track Pack 03	Mar. 5, 2009	Yes
1986	"C'est Comme Ça"	Les Rita Mitsouko	Alternative	European Track Pack 03	Mar. 5, 2009	Yes
2009	"Death Blossoms"	Rise Against	Punk	Rise Against Track Pack	Mar. 12, 2009	Yes
2008	"Audience of One"	Rise Against	Modern Rock	Rise Against Track Pack	Mar. 12, 2009	Yes
2006	"Ready to Fall"	Rise Against	Modern Rock	Rise Against Track Pack	Mar. 12, 2009	Yes
2007	"What Have You Done"	Within Temptation	Nu Metal	European Track Pack 04	Mar. 19, 2009	Yes
1988	"Hier kommt Alex"	Die Toten Hosen	Punk	European Track Pack 04	Mar. 19, 2009	Yes
2001	"Carolina" (Live)	M-Clan	Rock	European Track Pack 04	Mar. 19, 2009	Yes
1971	"Freedom"	Jimi Hendrix	Classic Rock	The Jimi Hendrix Track Pack 02	Mar. 19, 2009	No
1971	"Angel"	Jimi Hendrix	Classic Rock	The Jimi Hendrix Track Pack 02	Mar. 19, 2009	No
1969	"Foxy Lady" (Live at Woodstock)	Jimi Hendrix	Classic Rock	The Jimi Hendrix Track Pack 02	Mar. 19, 2009	No
1977	"We Are the Champions"	Queen	Classic Rock	Queen Track Pack	Mar. 26, 2009	Yes
1978	"Fat Bottomed Girls"	Queen	Classic Rock	Queen Track Pack	Mar. 26, 2009	Yes
2008	"C-lebrity"	Queen + Paul Rodgers	Hard Rock	Queen Track Pack	Mar. 26, 2009	Yes
2008	"The James Bond Theme"	Richard Fortus	Hard Rock	Single	Mar. 26, 2009	Yes
1989	"Debaser"	Pixies	Alternative	Pixies Track Pack	Apr. 2, 2009	Yes
1989	"Monkey Gone to Heaven"	Pixies	Alternative	Pixies Track Pack	Apr. 2, 2009	Yes
1991	"The Sad Punk"	Pixies	Alternative	Pixies Track Pack	Apr. 2, 2009	Yes
2009	"Panic Switch"	Silversun Pickups	Indie Rock	Silversun Pickups Track Pack	Apr. 9, 2009	Yes
2008	"It's Nice to Know You Work Alone"	Silversun Pickups	Indie Rock	Silversun Pickups Track Pack	Apr. 9, 2009	Yes
2008	"Well Thought Out Twinkles"	Silversun Pickups	Indie Rock	Silversun Pickups Track Pack	Apr. 9, 2009	Yes
1975	"Black Friday"	Steely Dan	Classic Rock	Steely Dan Track Pack	Apr. 16, 2009	Yes
1976	"Kid Charlemagne"	Steely Dan	Classic Rock	Steely Dan Track Pack	Apr. 16, 2009	Yes
1973	"Bodhisattva"	Steely Dan	Classic Rock	Steely Dan Track Pack	Apr. 16, 2009	Yes
2008	"Jailbait"^{+}	Motörhead	Metal	Motörhead Track Pack	Apr. 23, 2009^{e}	Yes
2008	"Love Me Like a Reptile"	Motörhead	Metal	Motörhead Track Pack	Apr. 23, 2009^{e}	Yes
2008	"Iron Fist"	Motörhead	Metal	Motörhead Track Pack	Apr. 23, 2009^{e}	Yes
1993	"Very Ape"	Nirvana	Grunge	Nirvana Track Pack 02	Apr. 30, 2009	Yes
1993	"Sappy"	Nirvana	Grunge	Nirvana Track Pack 02	Apr. 30, 2009	Yes
1991	"Stay Away"	Nirvana	Grunge	Nirvana Track Pack 02	Apr. 30, 2009	Yes
2009	"On Broken Glass"^{+}	Chimaira	Metal	Ferret/Metal Blade Track Pack	May 7, 2009^{a}	Yes
2009	"Dez Moines"^{+}	The Devil Wears Prada	Metal	Ferret/Metal Blade Track Pack	May 7, 2009^{a}	Yes
2008	"Grave of Opportunity"^{+}	Unearth	Metal	Ferret/Metal Blade Track Pack	May 7, 2009^{a}	Yes
2008	"So What"	Pink	Pop Rock	Pop Rock Track Pack	May 14, 2009	Yes
2007	"Stop and Stare"	OneRepublic	Pop Rock	Pop Rock Track Pack	May 14, 2009	Yes
2007	"Everything's Magic"	Angels & Airwaves	Pop Rock	Pop Rock Track Pack	May 14, 2009	Yes
2008	"Disconnected"^{+}	In Flames	Metal	European Track Pack 05	May 21, 2009	Yes
2008	"Oh Yeah!"	Housse de Racket	Rock	European Track Pack 05	May 21, 2009	Yes
2009	"Look Good in Leather"	Cody ChesnuTT	Funk	European Track Pack 05	May 21, 2009	Yes
2007	"The Touch"	Stan Bush	Pop Rock	Single	May 28, 2009^{a}	Yes
2008	"Guitar Hero On Tour: Modern Hits Theme"^{+}	S.U.P.R.A.H.U.M.A.N. - ProtoShredanoid	Rock	Single	June 4, 2009^{a}	Yes
2003	"The Bitter End"	Placebo	Alternative	European Track Pack 06	June 11, 2009	Yes
1989	"Cadillac Solitario" (Live)	Loquillo y Trogloditas	Rock	European Track Pack 06	June 11, 2009	Yes
2007	"Adrenalina"	Finley	Pop Punk	European Track Pack 06	June 11, 2009	Yes
2009	"Number with No Name"	Ben Harper and Relentless7	Rock	Ben Harper Track Pack	June 18, 2009	Yes
2009	"Shimmer & Shine"	Ben Harper and Relentless7	Rock	Ben Harper Track Pack	June 18, 2009	Yes
2009	"Fly One Time"	Ben Harper and Relentless7	Rock	Ben Harper Track Pack	June 18, 2009	Yes
1994	"Sample in a Jar" (Live)	Phish	Alternative	Phish Live Track Pack	June 25, 2009	Yes
1995	"Down with Disease" (Live)	Phish	Alternative	Phish Live Track Pack	June 25, 2009	Yes
1994	"Chalk Dust Torture" (Live)	Phish	Alternative	Phish Live Track Pack	June 25, 2009	Yes
2004	"21st Century (Digital Boy)"	Bad Religion	Punk	Epitaph Punk-O-Rama Track Pack	July 2, 2009	Yes
1994	"Linoleum"	NOFX	Punk	Epitaph Punk-O-Rama Track Pack	July 2, 2009	Yes
1995	"Ruby Soho"	Rancid	Punk	Epitaph Punk-O-Rama Track Pack	July 2, 2009	Yes
2009	"NJ Legion Iced Tea"^{+}	A Day to Remember	Post-Hardcore/Pop-Punk	Victory Track Pack	July 9, 2009	Yes
2009	"Bomb the World"	The Sleeping	Rock	Victory Track Pack	July 9, 2009	Yes
2009	"I Am the Arsonist"	Silverstein	Alternative	Victory Track Pack	July 9, 2009	Yes
2008	"Anything 'Cept the Truth"	Eagles of Death Metal	Rock	Eagles of Death Metal Track Pack	July 16, 2009	Yes
2006	"Cherry Cola"	Eagles of Death Metal	Rock	Eagles of Death Metal Track Pack	July 16, 2009	Yes
2004	"I Only Want You"	Eagles of Death Metal	Rock	Eagles of Death Metal Track Pack	July 16, 2009	Yes
2009	"All the World Is Mad"	Thrice	Alternative	Vagrant Records Track Pack	July 23, 2009	Yes
2009	"Young Cardinals"	Alexisonfire	Alternative	Vagrant Records Track Pack	July 23, 2009	Yes
2009	"The Martyr"^{+}	Senses Fail	Pop Punk	Vagrant Records Track Pack	July 23, 2009	Yes
2008	"Bloodmeat"^{+}	Protest the Hero	Nu Metal	Knuckle Sandwich Track Pack	July 30, 2009	Yes
2005	"I'm Shipping Up to Boston"	Dropkick Murphys	Punk	Knuckle Sandwich Track Pack	July 30, 2009	Yes
2007	"New Wave"	Against Me!	Pop Punk	Knuckle Sandwich Track Pack	July 30, 2009	Yes
1996	"Camel's Night Out"	Eric Johnson	Rock	Single	Aug. 6, 2009	Yes
2009	"The Silence Is Deafening"^{+}	Awaken	Rock	Activision Music Track Pack	Aug. 13, 2009^{a}	Yes
2009	"Nothing All the Time"	H Is Orange	Rock	Activision Music Track Pack	Aug. 13, 2009^{a}	Yes
2009	"I'll Never Know"	Hundred Reasons	Rock	Activision Music Track Pack	Aug. 13, 2009^{a}	Yes
2009	"Dueling Banjos"^{+}	Steve Ouimette	Blues Rock	Single	Aug. 20, 2009	Yes

^aThis song is available at no cost.

^bAlso part of the Dig Out Your Soul full album pack.

^cIs a cover by WaveGroup.

^dSong is available for Wii in Guitar Hero 5 but not Guitar Hero World Tour.

^eThese songs were rerecorded by the original artist for use in the game.

^+Song is available with a single and double bass drums chart when exported.
