= Seasick =

Seasick may refer to:

- Seasickness, a form of motion sickness
- Seasick (album), by Imperial Teen, 1990
- Seasick (film), or Merisairas, a 1996 Finnish-French-Swedish film
- "Seasick" (song), by Silversun Pickups, 2011
- "Sea Sick" (Hi Hi Puffy AmiYumi), a 2005 TV episode
- Seasick Steve, Steven Gene Wold (born 1951), American blues musician

== See also ==
- CSIC (disambiguation)
