= Pikul =

Pikul may refer to:

- Picul, a Javanese traditional unit of weight
- Pikul (EP), an EP by Silversun Pickups
- Joseph Pikul, American security analyst tried for the 1987 murder of his wife Diane Whitmore Pikul
- Valentin Pikul, Russian novelist
