= Better Nature =

Studio album by Silversun Pickups
- Released: September 25, 2015
- Genre: Alternative rock; new wave; shoegaze
- Length: 51:06
- Label: New Machine
- Producer: Jacknife Lee

Silversun Pickups chronology
Neck of the Woods (2012)	Better Nature (2015)	Better Nature Revisited (2017)

Singles from Better Nature
- 1. "Nightlight" Released: August 6, 2015; 2. "Circadian Rhythm (Last Dance)" Released: September 11, 2015; 3. "Latchkey Kids" Released: September 30, 2016

Professional ratings
Aggregate scores
Source	Rating
Metacritic	65/100
Review scores
Source	Rating
AllMusic	3.5/5 stars
Absolute Punk	8.5/10
Classic Rock	3.5/5 stars
Consequence of Sound	C−
Magnet	4/5 stars
The Music	3.5/5 stars
Q	2/5 stars
Sputnikmusic	3.5/5
The Sydney Morning Herald	3/5 stars
Under the Radar	6.5/10

Better Nature is the fourth studio album by Los Angeles alternative rock band Silversun Pickups. The album was produced by Jacknife Lee, and was released on September 25, 2015. It is the first of the band's albums to be released on their own label, New Machine Records; as well as their first to be supported by a Pledgemusic campaign. The album was announced on July 15, 2015. The lead single for the album, "Nightlight," was released to radio on August 6, 2015. It was accompanied by a music video, directed by Mark Pellington and starring Boardwalk Empire actor Meg Steedle. The album's second single, "Circadian Rhythm (Last Dance)," was premiered via The Daily Beast on September 10, 2015. An accompanying video, directed by Scott Weintrob, was released to YouTube and Vevo the following day.

== Track listing ==
All tracks are written by Silversun Pickups.

No.	Title	Length
1.	"Cradle (Better Nature)"	5:20
2.	"Connection"	4:34
3.	"Pins & Needles"	4:42
4.	"Friendly Fires"	5:28
5.	"Nightlight"	4:52
6.	"Circadian Rhythm (Last Dance)"	3:50
7.	"Tapedeck"	6:02
8.	"Latchkey Kids"	3:42
9.	"Ragamuffin"	6:00
10.	"The Wild Kind"	6:36
Total length:		51:06

- The end of "Tapedeck" leads into "Latchkey Kids" (aka the end of "Tapedeck" is a studio session of "Latchkey Kids" that then transitions into "Latchkey Kids")

=== Vinyl track listing ===
Side A
No.	Title	Length
1.	"Cradle (Better Nature)"	5:20
2.	"Connection"	4:34
3.	"Pins & Needles"	4:42
4.	"Friendly Fires"	5:28
Total length:		20:04

Side B
No.	Title	Length
1.	"Nightlight"	4:52
2.	"Circadian Rhythm (Last Dance)"	3:50
3.	"Tapedeck"	6:02
Total length:		14:44

Side C
No.	Title	Length
1.	"Latchkey Kids"	3:42
2.	"Ragamuffin"	6:00
3.	"The Wild Kind"	6:36
Total length:		16:18

== Charts ==
Chart (2015)	Peak position
Australian Albums (ARIA)	22
US Billboard 200	16

== Personnel ==
Silversun Pickups

- Brian Aubert – lead vocals, backing vocals, guitars
- Nikki Monninger – bass guitar, backing vocals, lead vocals (6), vibraphone (7)
- Joe Lester – keyboards, synthesizer, sound manipulation, drum machine, sequencer, backing vocals (5)
- Christopher Guanlao – drums, backing vocals (5)

Additional personnel

- Jacknife Lee – additional keyboards, mixing, production, programming
- Alan Moulder – mixing

== Tour ==
Better Nature Tour
- Concert by Silversun Pickups
- Associated album: Better Nature
- Start date: 10 September 2015
- End date: 23 July 2017
- Legs: [N/A]
- No. of shows: 152 shows

The tour for Better Nature started 15 days before the release of the album.

=== Setlist ===
Setlist won't count omissions due to the Sliversun Pickups' weird touring settings.

1. Cradle (Better Nature) (dropped after 22 April 2017)
2. Connection (played on 28 September 2015)
3. Well Thought Out Twinkles
4. Bloody Mary (Nerve Endings) (played on 10, 27, 28, 29 September 2015, 8 December 2015, 6, 9 May 2016, 23 August 2016, added on 23 April 2017, dropped after 4 May 2017)
5. Nightlight
6. The Royal We
7. Circadian Rhythm (Last Dance)
8. The Pit
9. Pins and Needles (played on 29, 30 September 2015, 25 April 2017)
10. Friendly Fires
11. Latchkey Kids
12. Panic Switch
13. Ragamuffin (dropped after 13 June 2017)
14. Vasoline (played on 5 December 2015)
15. Growing Old Is Getting Old (played on 6 May 2016)
16. Rusted Wheel (played on 26 April 2017)
17. Lazy Eye
18. Little Lover's so Polite [ENCORE]
19. Catch and Release (played on 10, 28 September 2015, added on 23 April 2017, dropped after 4 May 2017) [ENCORE]
20. Cannibal (played on 10, 27 September 2015, rarely played from December 2015 to April 2017) [ENCORE]
21. Substitution (played on 29 September 2015, occasionally played after April 2016) [ENCORE]
22. Three Seed (played on 14 April 2016, added on 25 October 2016, dropped after 5 May 2017) [ENCORE]
23. Kissing Families (occasionally played) [ENCORE]
24. Dots and Dashes (Enough Already) [ENCORE]
25. The Wild Kind (added on 27 September 2015, dropped after 5 May 2017) [ENCORE]
