= Swoon (Silversun Pickups album) =

Studio album by Silversun Pickups
- Released: April 14, 2009
- Recorded: July 2008 – February 2009
- Studio: Sunset Sound, Sound Factory and Paramount Studios
- Genre: Alternative rock; shoegaze
- Length: 51:42
- Label: Dangerbird
- Producer: Dave Cooley

Silversun Pickups chronology
Remixes (2007)	Swoon (2009)	Neck of the Woods (2012)

Singles from Swoon
- 1. "Panic Switch" Released: March 17, 2009; 2. "Substitution" Released: September 22, 2009; 3. "The Royal We" Released: February 16, 2010

Swoon is the second full-length studio album by Los Angeles alternative rock band Silversun Pickups, released through Dangerbird Records on 14 April 2009. The name of the album comes from a line in the outro of the first track "There's No Secrets This Year."

== Background information ==
After completing their Carnavas/Pikul tour in Christmas 2007, the band took a break until February of the next year. They began recording in their own studio named The Dark. The album was produced by Dave Cooley, who had worked with the band on their first album, Carnavas. Recording was completed between July 2008 and February 2009. During the recording process the band laid down as many as 17 songs which were eventually cut down to 10 for the album. On February 17, the band posted a list of the songs expected to be on Swoon on their MySpace blog.

The album was released on April 14, 2009. The first single released was "Panic Switch". On April 6, the track "There's No Secrets This Year" was released as a single on various online music stores. The bonus track "Currency of Love" was released exclusively on iTunes with pre-orders in the U.S. and Canada, but was issued as a regular album track in other countries. The song "Ne Plus Ultra" was released as a B-Side on the single Panic Switch.

Two tracks off of the album, "Panic Switch" and "It's Nice to Know You Work Alone," have been released as downloadable content for Guitar Hero: World Tour as part of a track pack released on April 9. The song "Panic Switch" was also released along with "Sort Of" for the Rock Band series on March 2, 2010. "Panic Switch" was also included with the game Rocksmith. "There's No Secrets This Year" appears in racing game Dirt 2 and the rhythm game Guitar Hero: Warriors of Rock. "It's Nice to Know You Work Alone" is also featured in the baseball game MLB 10: The Show.

== Artwork ==
As with Carnavas, the album's packaging features the artwork of Darren Waterston, this time using his 2008 piece "St.Clair" as the basis for the cover art. The inside packing also features Waterston's pieces "Disembodiment" and "Reverberations." All paintings are from his collection entitled "The Flowering."

== Reception ==
Professional ratings
Aggregate scores
Source	Rating
Metacritic	64/100
Review scores
Source	Rating
AllMusic	4/5 stars
The A.V. Club	B
Entertainment Weekly	B−
The Guardian	3/5 stars
Kerrang!	5/5 stars
NME	9/10
Pitchfork	5.3/10
Rolling Stone	3.5/5 stars
Spin	3.5/5 stars
Sputnikmusic	4/5

Like Carnavas, Swoon received generally positive reviews from critics. It accumulated a score of 64 out of 100 on Metacritic, based on 21 reviews. The album reached the seventh spot on the Billboard 200 with 43,000 copies sold in its first week, compared to "Carnavas", which peaked only at number 80 on the Billboard 200. As of May 2012, Swoon has sold 318,000 copies

== Track listing ==
All songs written and composed by Silversun Pickups.

No.	Title	Length
1.	"There's No Secrets This Year"	5:33
2.	"The Royal We"	4:47
3.	"Growing Old Is Getting Old"	5:54
4.	"It's Nice to Know You Work Alone"	4:45
5.	"Panic Switch"	5:44
6.	"Draining"	4:55
7.	"Sort Of"	5:28
8.	"Substitution"	4:41
9.	"Catch and Release"	4:40
10.	"Surrounded (or Spiraling)"	4:45
Total length:		51:42

=== Vinyl track listing ===
Side A
No.	Title	Length
1.	"There's No Secrets This Year"	5:33
2.	"The Royal We"	4:47
Total length:		10:20

Side B
No.	Title	Length
1.	"Growing Old Is Getting Old"	5:54
2.	"It's Nice to Know You Work Alone"	4:45
Total length:		10:39

Side C
No.	Title	Length
1.	"Panic Switch"	5:44
2.	"Draining"	4:55
3.	"Sort Of"	5:28
Total length:		16:07

Side D
No.	Title	Length
1.	"Substitution"	4:41
2.	"Catch and Release"	4:40
3.	"Surrounded (or Spiraling)"	4:45
Total length:		14:06

=== B-sides ===
No.	Title	Length
1.	"Currency of Love" (iTunes bonus track)	5:30
2.	"Ne Plus Ultra" (Limited Edition Promo code download)	5:14
3.	"Seasick" (Seasick)	6:45
4.	"Broken Bottles" (Seasick)	3:43
5.	"Ribbons and Detours" (Seasick)	3:26
6.	"Devil's Cup" (The Singles Collection)	3:02
Total length:		27:40

== Chart positions ==
=== Weekly charts ===
Chart (2009)	Peak position
Australian Albums (ARIA)	14
Canadian Albums (Billboard)	23
German Albums (Offizielle Top 100)	90
UK Albums (OCC)	107
US Billboard 200	7
US Independent Albums (Billboard)	1
US Top Rock Albums (Billboard)	2

=== Year-end charts ===
Chart (2009)	Position
US Billboard 200	178
US Top Rock Albums (Billboard)	45

=== Singles ===
Single	Chart (2009)	Peak position
"Panic Switch"	Canadian Hot 100	85
"Panic Switch"	U.S. Billboard Hot 100	92
"Panic Switch"	U.S. Billboard Alternative Songs	1
"Panic Switch"	U.S. Billboard Rock Songs	4
"Substitution"	U.S. Billboard Alternative Songs	17
"Substitution"	U.S. Billboard Rock Songs	26
Single	Chart (2010)	Peak
"The Royal We"	U.S. Billboard Alternative Songs	5
"The Royal We"	U.S. Billboard Rock Songs	22

== Personnel ==
Silversun Pickups

- Brian Aubert – guitar, vocals
- Nikki Monninger – bass, vocals
- Chris Guanlao – drums
- Joe Lester – keys

Production

- Produced by Dave Cooley
- Engineered by Steven Rhodes, Kristian Riley and Jason Gossman
- Mixed by Tony Hoffer and Jason Gossman
- Mastered by Stephen Marcussen
- String arrangements by Will Canzoneri

Art

- Cover art is from Darren Waterston's "St. Clair"
- Photos by Steve Gullick
- Layout by Sara Cumings

== Tour ==
Swoon Tour
- Concert by Silversun Pickups
- Associated album: Swoon
- Start date: 17 March 2009
- End date: 9 October 2010
- Legs: [N/A]
- No. of shows: 176 shows

=== Setlist ===
Songs do eventually get change position in the setlist. For example, "Catch and Release" from the encore to the normal setlist, with "Three Seed" taking their place in the encore.

1. Growing Old Is Getting Old
2. Well Thought Out Twinkles
3. Panic Switch
4. There's No Secrets This Year
5. The Royal We
6. Little Lover's So Polite
7. It's Nice to Know You Work Alone (played on 30 April 2009, added after 4 June 2009)
8. Future Foe Scenarios
9. Kissing Families
10. Draining (played on 4 June 2009, 3 July 2009, 19 June 2010)
11. Sort Of (added after 20 March 2009)
12. Lazy Eye
13. Surrounded (or Spiraling) (played on 3, 12, 30 April 2009) [ENCORE]
14. Substitution [ENCORE]
15. Catch and Release (added after 4 June 2009) [ENCORE]
16. Booksmart Devil (played on 18 October 2009) [not in encore, but played after Catch and Release, which wasn't in the encore on 18 October 2009]
17. Three Seed (added after 20 June 2010) [ENCORE]
18. Rusted Wheel (occasionally played from April to June 2009, added on 2 July 2009, dropped after 10 December 2009, played on 15, 18 June 2010) [ENCORE]
19. Creation Lake (occasionally played from July 2009 to June 2010) [ENCORE]
20. Common Reactor [ENCORE]
