= Widow's Weeds (Silversun Pickups album) =

Studio album by Silversun Pickups
- Released: June 7, 2019
- Genres: Alternative rock; indie rock
- Length: 47:50
- Label: New Machine Recordings
- Producer: Butch Vig

Silversun Pickups chronology
Better Nature (2015)	Widow's Weeds (2019)	Physical Thrills (2022)

Singles from Widow's Weeds
- 1. "It Doesn't Matter Why" Released: April 11, 2019; 2. "Freakazoid" Released: May 8, 2019

Widow's Weeds is the fifth studio album by American rock band Silversun Pickups. The album was released on June 7, 2019 through the band's own imprint, New Machine Recordings.

== Background and recording ==
On April 11, the album was announced to coincide with the release of the album's lead single, "It Doesn't Matter Why." It was also announced that Butch Vig would be producing the album, marking their first collaboration. In choosing Vig as the producer, bassist Nikki Monninger said "he really listens to each band member, and he puts a great value on each individual and what they can add to the music." She also noted that making the album "was very collaborative with him. He’s such an easygoing person, and he put everybody at ease."

== Composition and style ==
Brian Aubert described the album as being recorded while being in a personally dark spot in life, which prompted him to seek sobriety during the gap in the studio sessions. Aubert said that this has an effect on the record, although he says it's more focused on the changes of life rather than the sadness of life. Aubert told Rolling Stone that Widow's Weeds "does have a mourning vibe, but it’s not sad. It’s change." Aubert further explained that the album is about "growing up and moving on and letting go of things. And it’s OK to be sad about those things and mourn them. It’s actually healthy to do so and take the time to do it. At the end of the day, it’s going to be much better and much more fulfilling when you get through it."

In describing the album, Aubert notes it is a "more open, exposed album" compared to their previous efforts.

== Release and promotion ==
=== Singles ===
The first single, "It Doesn't Matter Why" came out on April 11, 2019. Paste described "It Doesn't Matter Why" as having "underlying sense of anxiety and nihilism coursing" throughout the track. The music video came out on April 11, 2019, the same day as the single itself was released. The video features the band and various actors and dancers becoming increasingly self-aware of their bodies, before letting the limbs of their bodies overtake them with their own consciousness. The video was directed by Suzie Vlcek.

On May 8, 2019, the band released a second single, entitled "Freakazoid".

== Reception ==
Professional ratings
Aggregate scores
Source	Rating
Metacritic	63/100
Review scores
Source	Rating
AllMusic	3.5/5 stars
Classic Rock	3.5/5 stars
Consequence of Sound	C+
Mojo	3.5/5 stars
The Music	2/5 stars
Pitchfork	4.9/10
Slant Magazine	4/5 stars
Sputnikmusic	3.2/5
The Times	3/5 stars

Widow's Weeds holds a rating of 63 on Metacritic, indicating generally favourable reviews. In a positive review of the album, Slant Magazine writer Graham Kervin stated that "the album presents a band brimming with reclaimed confidence and vitality, one that need no longer take refuge behind endless waves of feedback and sonic distractions." The album was also praised by Allmusic's Neil Z. Yeung, who called it "one of Silversun Pickups' most emotionally satisfying and cathartic listens." William Ruben Helms of Consequence of Sound was critical of the album, stating that while "it finds the band at their most self-assured with the cleanest, most polished sound of their career," it also feels "rushed, unfocused, hollow, and, worst of all, forgettable." In a negative review, Pitchfork writer Zoe Camp derided the band as being "a little big, a little brooding, but mostly boring," adding that the album is made up of "mid-tempo snoozers that are over-refined, hermetically sealed, and safe."

Loudwire named it one of the 50 best rock albums of 2019.

== Track listing ==
All tracks are written by Silversun Pickups.

No.	Title	Length
1.	"Neon Wound"	5:38
2.	"It Doesn't Matter Why"	4:08
3.	"Freakazoid"	4:49
4.	"Don't Know Yet"	4:24
5.	"Straw Man"	3:04
6.	"Bag of Bones"	4:58
7.	"Widow's Weeds"	5:17
8.	"Songbirds"	5:04
9.	"Simpatico"	5:18
10.	"We Are Chameleons"	5:10
Total length:		47:50

== Personnel ==
Silversun Pickups

- Brian Aubert – lead vocals, backing vocals, guitars, additional keyboards
- Nikki Monninger – bass, backing vocals
- Joe Lester – keyboards, synthesizer, sound manipulation
- Christopher Guanlao – drums, percussion

Additional personnel

- Butch Vig – producer
- Matt Booker – cello (2, 3, 5, 9)
- Paul Cartwright – violin (2, 3, 5, 9)
- Billy Bush – mixing, engineering
- Heba Kadry – mastering
- Lawrence Azerrad – graphic design
- Claire Marie Vogel – photography

== Charts ==
Chart (2019)	Peak position
Australian Digital Albums (ARIA)	24
US Billboard 200	83
US Independent Albums (Billboard)	2
US Top Alternative Albums (Billboard)	5
US Top Rock Albums (Billboard)	12
