= Dave Cooley =

American musician

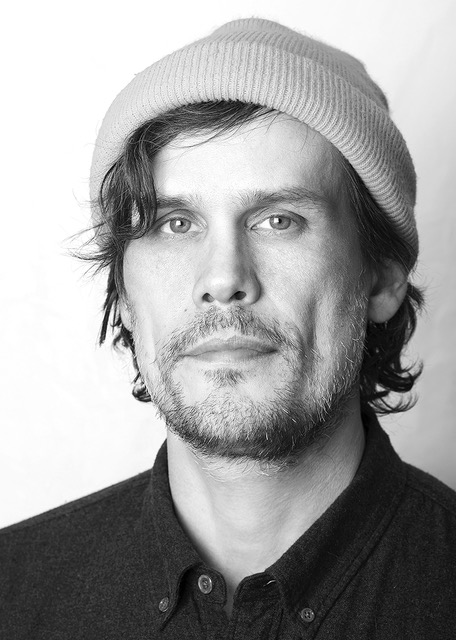
- Cooley in 2019

Background information
- Born: Milwaukee, Wisconsin
- Genres: Hip hop, rock, funk, alternative, reggae, electronic
- Occupations: Mastering engineer, audio restoration specialist, audio engineer, record producer
- Website: www.elysianmasters.com

Dave Cooley (David J. Cooley) is an American mastering engineer and audio restoration specialist. His numerous mastering credits include J Dilla's Donuts and The Diary, Paramore's After Laughter, 40th anniversary release of Bob Marley's Exodus box set, the reissue of Isaac Hayes' Concord Records albums (including Shaft, Hot Buttered Soul and Black Moses), as well as albums from independent labels Domino, Tuff Gong, Stones Throw Records, and Light in the Attic Records and artists M83, Ziggy Marley, J Dilla, Peanut Butter Wolf, Madvillain, Madlib and Animal Collective. He has worked on Grammy-nominated albums for Silversun Pickups, including their debut album Carnavas (which included the hit "Lazy Eye"), and its follow up, Swoon which included the hit “Panic Switch”, as well as Ziggy Marley's Fly Rasta, which won Grammy Award for Best Reggae Album in 2015. His remastering work for Sixto Rodriguez appeared in the soundtrack for Searching for Sugar Man, which was awarded an Oscar for Best Documentary Feature in 2013. He also mixed These New Puritans' album Hidden, named album of the year in 2010 by NME magazine.

== Early life and career ==
Originally living in Milwaukee, Wisconsin, Cooley was originally a member and keyboardist of Milwaukee bands Wild Kingdom and Citizen King. Cooley moved to Los Angeles to learn recording and production. He worked with producer Eric Valentine, assisting in sessions and eventually moving on to producing on his own. Most notable is Silversun Pickups’ debut and sophomore albums, Carnavas and Swoon. Cooley credits his interest in production and mastering with his interest in the genres of jazz, R&B, hip hop, funk music and collecting vinyl records.

Cooley founded Elysian Masters in 2001. Stones Throw Records gave Cooley his first opportunity in mastering records and he would master all of the label's recordings at the time, including recordings from J Dilla, Peanut Butter Wolf, Madvillan and Madlib.

In 2013, Cooley turned his focus completely to mastering, and masters both new releases and archival recordings at Elysian Masters studios in Los Angeles. Some of his notable mastering and remastering credits are Issac Hayes' Shaft, Hot Buttered Soul and Black Moses, Paramore's After Laughter, M83's Hurry Up, We're Dreaming, Wolf Alice's Visions of a Life, Bob Marley's Exodus box set, Madvillain's Madvillainy and J Dilla's Donuts.

Cooley is both a member of the AES (Audio Engineering Society) and IASA (International Association of Sound and Visual Archives).

== Awards and recognition ==
Cooley remastered the soundtrack for the documentary Searching for Sugar Man, which won the Oscar for Best Documentary Feature in 2013.

He's also mastered Ziggy Marley's Fly Rasta, which won the Grammy Award for Best Reggae Album in 2014 and M83's Hurry Up, We’re Dreaming, which was nominated for Best Alternative Album for the 2012 Grammys. He also mastered Silversun Pickups' Carnavas (nominated for a Best New Artist Grammy, 2009), Wolf Alice, Visions of a Life (winner, 2018 Mercury Prize) and the soundtrack of Wild Wild Country (winner, Documentary or Nonfiction Series, 2018 Primetime Emmy Awards).

== Selected discography ==
- Tame Impala, Borderline (single)
- Tame Impala. Patience (single)
- Metric, Art of Doubt
- Adrian Younge and Ali Shaheed Muhammed, The Midnight Hour
- Yves Tumor, Safe in the Hands of Love
- Dr. Dog, Critical Equation
- J Dilla, The Diary
- Blood Orange, Negro Swan
- Isaac Hayes, Shaft (remaster 2018)
- Isaac Hayes, Hot Buttered Soul (remaster 2018)
- Isaac Hayes, Black Moses (remaster 2018)
- Wolf Alice, Visions of a Life
- Paramore, After Laughter
- Sail The Seas, Myself the World and You
- Ariel Pink, Dedicated to Bobby Jameson
- Animal Collective, Painting With
- Bob Marley and The Wailers, Exodus - 40th Anniversary Edition
- Adrian Younge, The Electronique Void (Black Noise)
- Adrian Younge, Black Dynamite (Instrumentals)
- Jimmy Eat World, Integrity Blues
- Freddie Gibbs and Madlib, Pinata
- Ziggy Marley, Fly Rasta
- Fitz And The Tantrums, More Than Just A Dream
- M83, Hurry Up, We're Dreaming
- These New Puritans, Hidden
- Silversun Pickups, Carnavas
- Madvillain, Madvillainy
- J Dilla, Donuts
- Soundtrack, Searching for Sugar Man
- Various artists, Pacific Breeze: Japanese City Pop, AOR and Boogie 1976–1986 (2019)
