= CSIC =

CSIC may refer to:

- Cabinet Satellite Intelligence Center, the satellite surveillance unit of the Japanese intelligence agency
- Centre for the Study of Contemporary Islam, an Italian study centre on Islam
- China Shipbuilding Industry Corporation, a shipbuilding conglomerate
- Chinese Standard Interchange Code, the standard character set of the Republic of China
- Central States Intercollegiate Conference, a defunct American intercollegiate athletic conference
- Spanish National Research Council, a Spanish national research agency
