= Seasick (song) =

Single by Silversun Pickups
- B-side: "Broken Bottles"; "Ribbons & Detours"
- Released: November 25, 2011
- Genre: Alternative rock
- Label: Dangerbird (DGB079)
- Songwriters: Brian Aubert, Christopher Guanlao, Joe Lester, Nikki Monninger

Silversun Pickups singles chronology
"The Royal We" (2010)	"Seasick" (2011)	"Bloody Mary (Nerve Endings)" (2012)

"Seasick" is a single by the American alternative rock band Silversun Pickups. The single was released in a 10" vinyl record format on November 25, 2011 for Record Store Day's "Back to Black Friday" event through Dangerbird Records. A digital version was released on December 13, 2011. The single's A-side and two B-sides are previously unreleased tracks that were originally recorded during the Swoon sessions.

== Track listing ==
Side A

1. "Seasick" – 6:45

Side B

1. "Broken Bottles" – 3:43
2. "Ribbons & Detours" – 3:26

== Personnel ==
- Brian Aubert – guitar, vocals
- Chris Guanlao – drums
- Joe Lester – keys
- Nikki Monninger – bass, vocals
