= Substitution (Silversun Pickups song) =

Single by Silversun Pickups

from the album Swoon
- Released: September 15, 2009
- Length: 4:41
- Label: Dangerbird
- Songwriters: Brian Aubert; Christopher Guanlao; Joe Lester; Nikki Monninger
- Producer: Dave Cooley

Silversun Pickups singles chronology
"Panic Switch" (2009)	"Substitution" (2009)	"The Royal We" (2010)

"Substitution" is a song by American indie rock band Silversun Pickups. It is the second single from the band's second studio album Swoon (2009). The song was released to American modern rock radio on September 15, 2009.

"Substitution" reached numbers 17 and 26 on Billboard's Alternative Songs and Rock Songs charts, respectively.

== Music video ==
The music video for "Substitution" was directed by The Malloys and premiered on September 15, 2009. It features models playing a game of musical chairs as the band performs the song.

In an interview prior to the video's release, the band's frontman Brian Aubert claimed: "They were actually playing musical chairs for a real prize. It got pretty ugly. Everybody in the room watching it was like, 'This is the weirdest thing.' All the girls are color-coded. In one way, it's bright and sort of silly, but the way we're looking at it is sort of depressing. In fact, I have to admit: it's by far the darkest video we've ever done."

== Track listing ==
Digital EP
No.	Title	Length
1.	"Substitution"	4:39
2.	"Panic Switch" (live)	5:54
3.	"Growing Old Is Getting Old" (live)	6:05

== Charts ==
Chart (2009–10)	Peak position
Canada Rock (Billboard)	29
Mexico Ingles Airplay (Billboard)	22
US Alternative Airplay (Billboard)	17
US Hot Rock & Alternative Songs (Billboard)	26
