= Physical Thrills =

Studio album by Silversun Pickups
- Released: August 19, 2022
- Studio: Red Razor Sounds; GrungeIsDead; Eastwest Studios; Dave's Room
- Genre: Indie rock; alternative rock
- Length: 52:49
- Label: New Machine Recordings
- Producer: Butch Vig

Silversun Pickups chronology
Widow's Weeds (2019)	Physical Thrills (2022)	Tenterhooks (2026)

Singles from Physical Thrills
- 1. "Scared Together" Released: July 11, 2022; 2. "Alone on a Hill" Released: August 5, 2022

Professional ratings
Aggregate scores
Source	Rating
Metacritic	77/100
Review scores
Source	Rating
AllMusic	3.5/5 stars
Financial Times	3/5 stars
Kerrang!	4/5
Pitchfork	6.3/10
Record Collector	3/5 stars
Sputnikmusic	4.1/5

Physical Thrills is the sixth studio album by American alternative rock band Silversun Pickups. It was released on August 19, 2022, and was their second album to be produced by Butch Vig and their third album to be released on their own label, New Machine Recordings.

== Track listing ==
All tracks are written by Silversun Pickups.

No.	Title	Length
1.	"Stillness (Way Beyond)"	5:15
2.	"Sticks and Stones"	4:43
3.	"Hereafter (Way After)"	3:34
4.	"Dream at Tempo 050"	1:37
5.	"Scared Together"	3:56
6.	"Alone on a Hill"	3:46
7.	"Hidden Moon"	3:35
8.	"System Error"	4:04
9.	"Empty Nest"	4:16
10.	"Dream at Tempo 310"	1:15
11.	"We Won't Come Out"	5:12
12.	"Stay Down (Way Down)"	5:06
13.	"Quicksand"	5:14
14.	"Dream at Tempo 150"	1:09
Total length:		52:49

== Personnel ==
Silversun Pickups

- Brian Aubert – lead vocals (1–3, 5, 7–13), guitars (1–3, 5, 7–13), bass and additional keyboards (4, 6), backing vocals (6)
- Nikki Monninger – bass (1–3, 5, 7–13), backing vocals (1–3, 5, 7–10, 12–13), lead vocals (4, 6)
- Joe Lester – keyboards, synthesizer, talk box (5), sound manipulation
- Christopher Guanlao – drums, percussion

Additional personnel

- Butch Vig – producer
- Billy Bush – mixing, engineering
- Heba Kadry – mastering
- Mike Fasano – technician
- Lawrence Azerrad – graphic design, art direction
- Claire Marie Vogel – photography
