= Centre for the Study of Contemporary Islam =

Italian study centre on Islam based in Rome

The Centre for the Study of Contemporary Islam (full official name in Italian Centro Studi sull'Islam Contemporaneo, CSIC) is an Italian institute specialised in Islamic studies.

It is a private association and its headquarters are in Rome.

The Centre's activities branch out in two main directions: MENA and APAC programmes, making research, publications, and events. CSIC is an impartial scientific benchmark for all those interested in international issues: from members of the political and cultural worlds to operators in the business community, public administrations, international bodies and non governmental organisations.
