= Carnavas =

Studio album by Silversun Pickups
- Released: July 25, 2006
- Recorded: January – April 2006
- Studios: Beer Wine Fish, Echo Park; Sunset Sound, Hollywood, California
- Genres: Alternative rock; indie rock; post-punk revival; nu gaze; dream pop
- Length: 55:54; 67:50 (vinyl release)
- Label: Dangerbird
- Producer: Dave Cooley

Silversun Pickups chronology
Pikul (2005)	Carnavas (2006)	Live Session (2007)

Singles from Carnavas
- 1. "Lazy Eye" Released: February 2007; 2. "Future Foe Scenarios" Released: May 21, 2007; 3. "Well Thought Out Twinkles" Released: July 2, 2007; 4. "Little Lover's So Polite" Released: February 12, 2008

Professional ratings
Review scores
Source	Rating
AllMusic	3.5/5 stars
Alternative Press	5/5 stars
The Guardian	3/5 stars
IGN	9.1/10
The Line of Best Fit	41%
NME	4/5 stars
Pitchfork	5.0/10
PopMatters	7/10
Rolling Stone	3.5/5 stars
Spin	3/5 stars

Carnavas is the debut studio album by alternative band Silversun Pickups. It was released on July 25, 2006. "Carnavas" is a surname from the Greek side of lead guitarist and vocalist Brian Aubert's family. Some suppliers were also given copies of The Tripwire Session: Live in Chicago, a four-track EP.

The album generated two successful singles on the US Modern Rock chart. "Lazy Eye" hit number 5 in 2007 and "Well Thought Out Twinkles" reached number 9 in 2008. Carnavas has sold more than 500,000 copies and was certified gold in the US on May 31, 2018.

== Artwork ==
The CD cover for Carnavas is a slightly edited partial image of artist Darren Waterston's 2004 painting Summit. The inlay, also featured on the Silversun Pickups' website and Myspace page, is titled "Becoming Tree".

== In popular culture ==
The song "Rusted Wheel" was used during the end credits roll of the film Puncture. The song "Well Thought Out Twinkles" is featured on the soundtrack of the skateboarding video game Tony Hawk's Proving Ground on top of being downloadable content for the games Rock Band and Rock Band 2 along with "Melatonin".

Similarly, "Lazy Eye" is a playable song in both Rock Band 2 and Guitar Hero World Tour. The song is also featured on the Forza Horizon soundtrack, on the "Horizon Rocks" station and also featured in television advertising for New World supermarkets in New Zealand. The band has performed "Lazy Eye" on the Late Show with David Letterman, The Tonight Show with Jay Leno, Later With Jools Holland, and Last Call with Carson Daly.

The music video for "Lazy Eye" received airplay on MTV, MTV2, MTVU, VH1, Fuse, MuchMusic, MTV (Latin America), International Music Feed and many other international broadcast outlets. The popularity of the "Lazy Eye" music video led to the creation of a VH1 "Pop-Up Video" version and it was among the MTV2 Subterranean "Viewers Top 20 Music Videos of 2007" list.

== Track listing ==
All tracks are written by Silversun Pickups (Brian Aubert, Nikki Monninger, Joe Lester, Christopher Guanlao).

Carnavas track listing
No.	Title	Length
1.	"Melatonin"	4:04
2.	"Well Thought Out Twinkles"	4:02
3.	"Checkered Floor"	4:51
4.	"Little Lover's So Polite"	4:58
5.	"Future Foe Scenarios"	5:20
6.	"Waste It On"	4:13
7.	"Lazy Eye"	5:54
8.	"Rusted Wheel"	6:00
9.	"Dream at Tempo 119"	4:51
10.	"Three Seed"	5:40
11.	"Common Reactor"	6:01

Vinyl bonus track
No.	Title	Length
1.	"Mercury"	5:38
2.	"Table Scraps"	6:18
Total length:		11:56

=== Vinyl edition ===
Side A
No.	Title	Length
1.	"Melatonin"	4:04
2.	"Well Thought Out Twinkles"	4:02
3.	"Checkered Floor"	4:51
4.	"Little Lover's So Polite"	4:58
Total length:		17:55

Side B
No.	Title	Length
5.	"Future Foe Scenarios"	5:20
6.	"Waste It On"	4:13
7.	"Lazy Eye"	5:54
Total length:		15:27

Side C
No.	Title	Length
8.	"Rusted Wheel"	6:00
9.	"Dream at Tempo 119"	4:51
Total length:		10:51

Side D
No.	Title	Length
10.	"Three Seed"	5:40
11.	"Common Reactor"	6:01
Total length:		11:41

The 2 bonus tracks come on a 7" in some vinyl editions of the album, along with a card to download both the tracks online.

== Personnel ==
- Brian Aubert – guitar/vocals
- Nikki Monninger – bass/backing vocals
- Christopher Guanlao – drums
- Joe Lester – keyboards
- Dave Cooley – producer
- Tom Biller – engineer
- Tony Hoffer – mixing

== Charts ==
=== Album ===
Chart performance for Carnavas
Chart (2007)	Peak position
Australian Albums (ARIA)	65
Belgian Albums (Ultratop Flanders)	84
US Billboard 200	80
US Independent Albums (Billboard)	5

=== Singles ===
Chart performance for singles for Carnavas
Year	Single	Chart	Peak position
2007	"Lazy Eye"	US Billboard Modern Rock	5
2007	"Lazy Eye"	US Billboard Bubbling Under Hot 100 Singles	2
2007	"Lazy Eye"	US Billboard Pop 100	91
2007	"Lazy Eye"	US Billboard Modern Rock Songs (Year-End Charts)	17
2008	"Well Thought Out Twinkles"	US Billboard Modern Rock	9

== Tour ==
Carnavas Tour
- Concert by Silversun Pickups
- Associated album: Carnavas
- Start date: July 6, 2006
- End date: September 28, 2008
- Legs: [N/A]
- No. of shows: 226 shows

The Carnavas Tour, the first ever major Silversun Pickups tour, kicked off on July 6, 2006.

Only around 50 shows have known setlists out of the 226 shows as of October 1, 2022.

=== Set list ===
1. "Well Thought Out Twinkles"
2. "Dream at Tempo 119"
3. "Rusted Wheel"
4. "Little Lover's So Polite"
5. "Future Foe Scenarios"
6. "Kissing Families"
7. "Lazy Eye"
8. "Common Reactor"

==== Other songs ====
list does not include cover songs

- "The Royal We" (played on 28 September 2008)
- "Panic Switch" (played on 24 March 2007, 7, 28 September 2008)
- "There's No Secrets This Year" (played on 24 March 2007)
- "Booksmart Devil" (played on 15 September 2007)
- "Checkered Floor" (played on 24 March 2007, 19, 20 October 2007)
- "...All the Go Inbetweens" (played on 13 August 2006, 12 April 2007, 8, 10 May 2007, 29 June 2007, 27 July 2007, 15 September 2007, 19, 20 October 2007, 17 November 2007)
- "Melatonin" (occasionally played from July 2006 to November 2007)
- "Comeback Kid" (played on 13 August 2006, 14 November 2006, occasionally played from April to November 2007, played on 29 March 2008)
- "Waste It On" (played on 29 July 2006, 14 November 2006, occasionally played from April to November 2007)
- "Three Seed" (occasionally played from April to November 2007)
