= Tenterhooks (Silversun Pickups album) =

Studio album by Silversun Pickups
- Released: February 6, 2026
- Genre: Alternative rock; dream pop; indie rock
- Length: 39:22
- Label: New Machine
- Producer: Butch Vig

Silversun Pickups chronology
Physical Thrills (2022)	Tenterhooks (2026)

Singles from Tenterhooks
- 1. "The Wreckage" Released: November 6, 2025; 2. "New Wave" Released: December 5, 2025; 3. "Long Gone" Released: January 15, 2026

Professional ratings
Aggregate scores
Source	Rating
Metacritic	59/100
Review scores
Source	Rating
AllMusic	3/5 stars
Pitchfork	5.2/10
Sputnikmusic	3.5/5

Tenterhooks is the seventh studio album by American alternative rock band Silversun Pickups. It was released on February 6, 2026, and is their third album to be produced by Butch Vig and their fourth album to be released on their own label, New Machine Recordings.

== Background ==
Stereogum reported that recording for Tenterhooks had had to be paused after lead singer Brian Aubert was hospitalized with an eardrum injury. In an interview on the Comedy Bang! Bang! podcast, Aubert clarified that he had gone to the emergency room with an ear infection – interrupting a photoshoot for the album – and was subsequently hospitalized with blood loss due to stomach damage from ibuprofen.

== Track listing ==
All tracks are written by Silversun Pickups.

No.	Title	Length
1.	"New Wave"	4:04
2.	"The Wreckage"	4:28
3.	"Au Revoir Reservoir"	3:21
4.	"Wakey Wakey"	2:00
5.	"Witness Mark"	4:53
6.	"Thorns and All"	4:28
7.	"Long Gone"	3:55
8.	"Running Out of Sounds"	3:27
9.	"Interrobang"	5:17
10.	"Hot Wired"	3:29
Total length:		39:22

== Personnel ==
Silversun Pickups

- Brian Aubert – lead vocals (1, 2, 4–10), guitar
- Nikki Monninger – bass, backing vocals (1, 2, 4–10), lead vocals (3)
- Joe Lester – keyboards
- Christopher Guanlao – drums

Additional personnel

- Butch Vig – production
- Laura Brenes – French horn (1, 6)
- Ido Meshulam – trombone (1, 6)

== Charts ==
Chart performance for Tenterhooks
Chart (2026)	Peak position
UK Album Downloads (OCC)	65
UK Independent Albums Breakers (OCC)	15
US Top Album Sales (Billboard)	25
