= Neck of the Woods =

Studio album by Silversun Pickups
- Released: May 8, 2012
- Genres: Alternative rock; indie rock; shoegaze; dream pop
- Length: 58:50
- Label: Dangerbird
- Producer: Jacknife Lee

Silversun Pickups chronology
Swoon (2009)	Neck of the Woods (2012)	Better Nature (2015)

Singles from Neck of the Woods
- 1. "Bloody Mary (Nerve Endings)" Released: March 25, 2012; 2. "The Pit" Released: September 25, 2012; 3. "Dots and Dashes (Enough Already)" Released: January 18, 2013

Neck of the Woods is the third studio album by Los Angeles alternative rock band Silversun Pickups. The album was produced by Jacknife Lee (R.E.M., Bloc Party) and was released on May 8, 2012, through independent label Dangerbird Records. Lead single "Bloody Mary (Nerve Endings)" was released via the band's official YouTube channel on March 25. On May 2, 2012 MTV Buzzworthy posted a full stream of the album online.

The album cover is a photograph by American photographer Todd Hido.

== Reception ==
Professional ratings
Aggregate scores
Source	Rating
Metacritic	69/100
Review scores
Source	Rating
AllMusic	4/5 stars
Alternative Press	4/5 stars
The A.V. Club	B
Drowned in Sound	6/10
Los Angeles Times	3/4 stars
New Zealand Herald	4/5 stars
Paste	8.5/10
Pitchfork	4.8/10
Rolling Stone	3.5/5 stars
Sputnikmusic	3.5/5

Reception for Neck of the Woods was generally positive. Review aggregating website Metacritic, which calculates an average score based on critical reviews, reports that the album scored 69 out of a possible 100, indicating "generally favorable reviews". Matt Collar of Allmusic awarded the album four out of five stars and stated, "building upon Swoons layered melodicism and once again showcasing lead singer/songwriter Brian Aubert's knack for evocative, introspective lyrics and fiery, multi-dubbed guitar parts, Neck of the Woods is an even more infectious and nuanced affair." Alternative Press journalist Scott Heisel also awarded the album four out of five stars. He expressed that "On Neck of the Woods, Silversun Pickups aren't reliving the ghosts of alt-rock past. Instead, they're helping define the genre's future." He added that the album felt "complete-and essential".

Other reviews were less positive. Pitchfork Media only award the album a 4.8 out of 10, concluding that "Appropriately enough, many of Aubert's lyrics here bristle with restlessness, fatigue and disappointment-- "I'm still waiting," "I'm already bored," "What am I aiming towards/ A fight that never ends," "Nothing's coming"—all of which serve to make Neck of the Woods a concept album about the feeling you get listening to Neck of the Woods".

== Track listing ==
All tracks are written by Silversun Pickups.

No.	Title	Length
1.	"Skin Graph"	6:00
2.	"Make Believe"	5:12
3.	"Bloody Mary (Nerve Endings)"	5:10
4.	"Busy Bees"	5:36
5.	"Here We Are (Chancer)"	4:48
6.	"Mean Spirits"	4:48
7.	"Simmer"	6:50
8.	"The Pit"	4:40
9.	"Dots and Dashes (Enough Already)"	5:06
10.	"Gun-Shy Sunshine"	5:36
11.	"Out of Breath"	5:00
Total length:		58:50

== Chart positions ==
Chart (2012)	Peak position
Australian Albums Chart (ARIA)	23
Belgian Albums Chart (Flanders)	120
Belgian Heatseekers (Flanders)	20
Canadian Albums Chart (Canoe)	11
Canadian Alternative Albums (Canoe)	2
UK Albums Chart (The Official Charts Company)	86
US Billboard 200	6
US Alternative Albums (Billboard)	1
U.S Independent Albums (Billboard)	1
U.S Rock Albums (Billboard)	2

== Personnel ==
All songs written and composed by Silversun Pickups.

- Brian Aubert - Main Vocals / Guitar
- Nikki Monninger - Bass Guitar / Backing Vocals
- Joe Lester - Keyboards / Sound Manipulation
- Christopher Guanlao - Drums

Additional personnel

- Jacknife Lee - Keyboards, Mixing, Producer, Programming
- Lawrence Azerrad - Graphic Design
- Sam Bell - Engineer, Mixing
- Matt Bishop - Assistant Engineer, Editing
- Jeff Castelaz - A&R
- John Davis - Mastering
- Todd Hido - Photography
