= Darren Waterston =

American painter

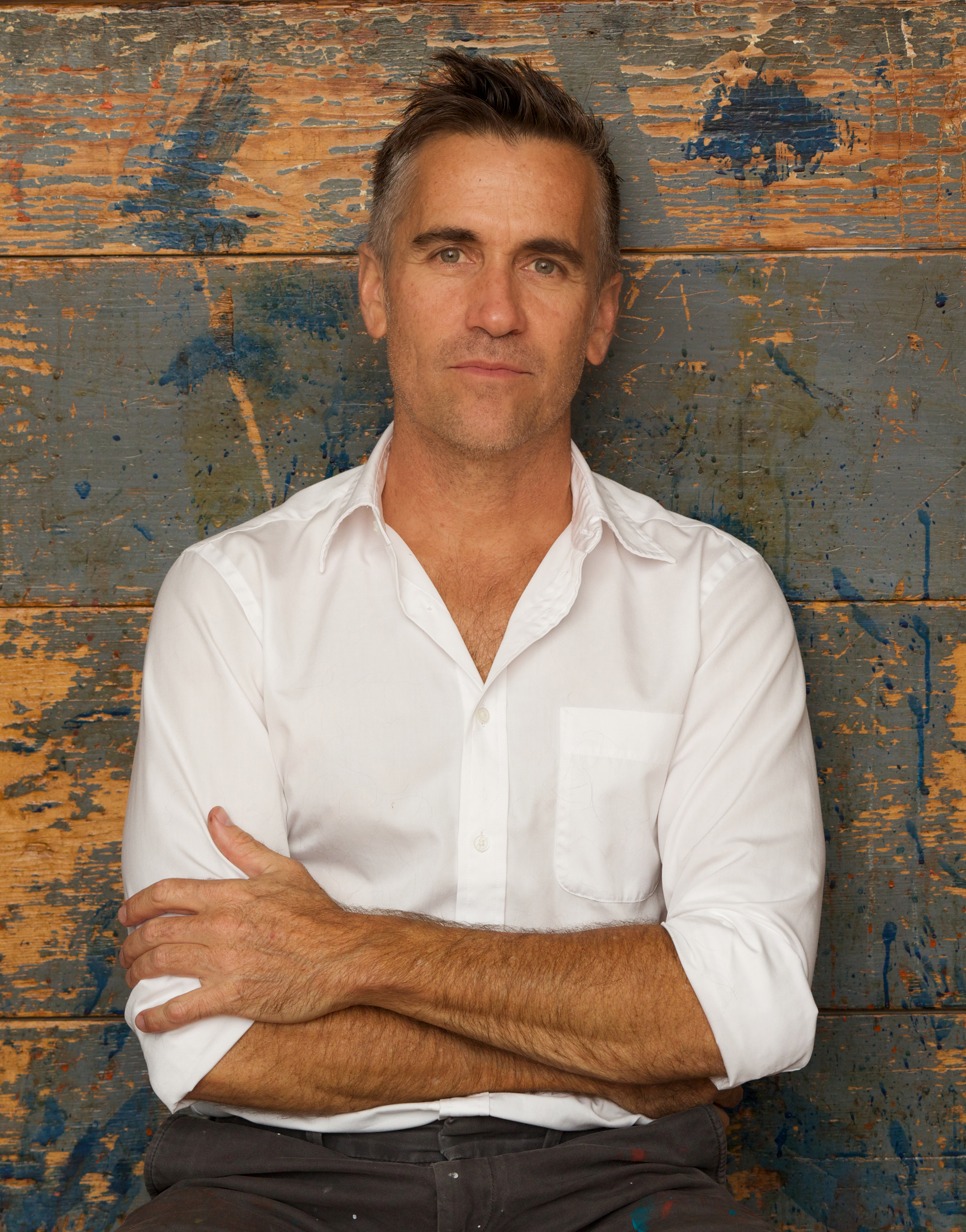
Waterston

Darren Waterston (born 1965) is an American artist who is mainly known for his ethereal paintings.

== Early life and education ==
Waterson was born in California in 1965. He received his BFA at the Otis Art Institute in Los Angeles in 1988. From 1986-87 he studied at the Akademie der Künste in Berlin, Germany and Kunstakademie Münster - Hochschule für Bildende Künste in Münster, Germany.

== Works ==
In 2011, Waterston finished Forest Eater, which comprised approximately fifty paintings and works on paper and four site-specific sculptures. The largest of the sculptures is "Wrath", a forbidding eighteen-foot long vertical lava formation, which hung from the museum's ceiling. The project was conceived specifically for the Honolulu Contemporary Art Museum.

=== Filthy Lucre ===
Filthy Lucre presents a dystopian version of The Peacock Room, James McNeill Whistler's 1876 decorative masterpiece. Waterston's work, like The Peacock Room, probes and considers the conflation of painting, architecture, patronage, and artistic ego. The project was conceived specifically for the Massachusetts Museum of Contemporary Art and first exhibited in 2014. In May 2015, it opened at the Arthur M. Sackler Gallery, while The Peacock Room of the adjoining Freer Gallery of Art undergoes renovation.

== Critical reception ==
Of The Flowering: The Fourfold Sense, DeWitt Cheng wrote: "Darren Waterston’s older paintings were lyrical misty landscapes with silhouetted flora and fauna. His newer works, symbolist abstractions, become mindscapes in which ambiguous transparent forms arise, float, flutter, and sink amid mist, clouds, swirls, drips, and vermicular coils of brushstrokes; each image with its poetic cycles of life represents the cosmos as 'a divine chaos.'"

Sue Taylor wrote: "Adept at a myriad of fluid effects, Waterston is a virtuosic colorist as well, enlivening the palest mauve and power-blue fogs with passages of burning orange or hot pink. In these apocalyptic dreams, he imagines flashing, otherworldly realms at the brink of consciousness."

Of Waterston's exhibition Last Days, Regina Hackett, a Seattle Post-Intelligencer art critic, wrote: "If there's a more imitated painter in America than Darren Waterston, I can't imagine who it would be. Waterston's silky rot and colored goo are gorgeous. They imply a world in which the air has evolved to carry a weightless and more sophisticated kind of consciousness. Working in oils on panel, Waterston creates worlds inside the world, what Gerald Manley Hopkins' described in God's Grandeur: 'Because the Holy Ghost over the bent/ World broods with warm breast and with ah! bright wings.' In the current exhibit, titled Last Days, Waterston merges beauty with blight. He paints starlight inside a cave, roots in the air, and minerals dissolving into liquids. 'Fallen' features a hollowed-out and free-floating tree trunk. White orchids with stale, shadowed edges hang suspended under fragments of enameled blue sky."

== Selected books and catalogues ==
- Baas, Jacquelynn et al. Darren Waterston: Representing the Invisible. Milan: Edizioni Charta, ISBN 978-88-8158-624-0
- Baas, Jacquelynn. Material, Immaterial: Waterston's Ghosts, New York: Charles Cowles Gallery
- Burton, Tim and Carmine Iannaccone. Darren Waterston: Paintings. Los Angeles: Kohn Turner Gallery, 2000
- Clothier, Peter. In the Reeds and the Rushes, Fresno, CA: The Fresno Art Museum, 1999
- Cross, Susan et al. Darren Waterston: Filthy Lucre. New York, Skira Rizzoli, 2014
- Doty, Mark and Darren Waterston. A Swarm, A Flock, A Host: A Compendium of Creatures. New York: Prestel, 2013, ISBN 978-3-7913-4757-8
- Gamblin, Noriko. Darren Waterston. New York: Charles Cowles Gallery, 1997
- Gamblin, Noriko. Elegies, Long Beach, CA: Long Beach Museum of Art, 1992
- Khalip, Jacques. Darren Waterston: Split the Lark. New York, DC Moore Gallery, 2014
- Kimball, Cathy. Was and Is Not and Is to Come, San Jose, CA: San Jose Institute of Contemporary Art, 2007
- Pagel, David. Hyle. Paris: Galerie Jean-Luc and Takako Richard, 2006
- Robinson, James et al. Darren Waterston's Filthy Lucre: Whistler's Peacock Room Reimagined. London, V&A Publishing, 2020
- Voorhies, James. Darren Waterston: Remote Futures. New York: DC Moore Gallery, 2012
- Waterston, Darren and Tyrus Miller. The Flowering (The Fourfold Sense). Portland, OR: Lewis & Clark College, 2007
- Weissman, Benjamin, and Amy Gerstler, Darren Waterston, Los Angeles: St. Ann's Press, 2001
