= International Music Feed =

Defunct music channel in the United States

- Broadcast area: Cable and mobile: United States; Mobile only: United Kingdom, Ireland and France

Ownership
- Owner: Universal Music Group

History
- Launched: January 20, 2005; 21 years ago
- Closed: March 30, 2008; 18 years ago (replaced with Ovation TV)

Links
- Website: www.imf.com (no longer in service)

The International Music Feed was a music television channel founded by Andy Schuon, who was Chief Executive Officer. IMF launched in 2005 broadcasting in the United States. IMF had a broad music policy focusing on music from around the world. The channel ceased operating in March 2008. It was the only channel in the US that focused on combining music from American artists with music from other countries across the globe. IMF maintained the increasingly rare format based very largely on playing music videos rather than other programming. The channel was wholly owned by Universal Music Group, but played artists from all labels.

== Closure ==
It was announced January 7, 2008, that the station would be going off the air. January 9 was the end of the station's major market run, after Ovation TV purchased the channel and replaced it with Ovation TV on systems that did not already offer the channel.

== Programming ==
The channel ran 8-hour blocks of programming, broadcast three times a day, starting at 4PM ET, repeating at 12 Midnight ET and 8AM ET.

- World's Best Videos - Showed music videos from the top 40 chart, and included some music videos that were not known outside of their home nation. (Usually 60 minutes)
- Hello World - Music celebrity, and international "playboy" Mack Diamond voice acted by channel founder and CEO Andy Schuon who hosted music videos from a specific country along with an assortment of random facts about that country. (10–15 minutes)
- One World - Showed music videos that were not often seen and usually did not play videos from the top 40 chart. (30 minutes)
- Journey to the Center of the Rock - Showed a wide variety of rock videos from many different subgenres and from many different countries. (30 minutes)
- Bodega Beats - Featured reggaeton and Latin Hip-Hop music videos. It was aired Wednesday nights at 10PM and was hosted by B-Real. An audio-only version of Bodega Beats was formerly broadcast on Station 90 on XM Satellite Radio. (30 minutes)
- Bridge to Latin America - Played music videos from Latin America. (30 minutes)
- JRock Feed - A brief segment which featured interviews with artists and fans during the JRock Revolution Festival held at The Wiltern Theatre in Los Angeles, California. Plans for a full music block showcasing a wide variety of Japanese Rock and Pop artists were announced in a thread posted by IMF staff in the "International Artists" section of the channel's Boards , but these plans never came to fruition due to the sudden buyout by Ovation TV.
- Passage to India - Shows music videos from India. (30 minutes)
- The Best of Farm Club - Shows random songs and interviews from artists that have appeared on the USA Network show Farmclub.com. (30 minutes)
- Hip Hop Society - Features international hip hop music videos. (30 minutes)
- Raw Feed - Behind the scenes footage of artists. The length of each Raw Feed varies, but most are 30 seconds or less. Raw Feed is shown at random between music videos.
- The Feed Center - Brief news spots focusing on artists, usually pertaining to their latest or upcoming music video. (2 to 5 minutes)
- Local Feed - Host Chad Mann interviews bands and other people from major international cites (such as Tokyo and Stockholm) and gives short reports (1–4 minutes) on various topics about the city. Aired randomly between music videos.
