= Well Thought Out Twinkles =

Single by Silversun Pickups

from the album Carnavas
- Released: July 2, 2007
- Recorded: 2006
- Studio: Beer Wine Fish, Echo Park; Sunset Sound, Hollywood, California
- Genre: Alternative rock; shoegaze; dream pop
- Length: 4:02
- Label: Dangerbird
- Songwriters: Brian Aubert; Christopher Guanlao; Joe Lester; Nikki Monninger
- Producer: Dave Cooley

Silversun Pickups singles chronology
"Future Foe Scenarios" (2007)	"Well Thought Out Twinkles" (2007)	"Little Lover's So Polite" (2008)

"Well Thought Out Twinkles" is a song by American rock band Silversun Pickups. The song was released as the third single from the band's debut album Carnavas, peaking at no. 9 on the Billboard Modern Rock Tracks chart.

== Reception ==
In his review of Carnavas, Carlos Grischow of IGN selected "Well Thought Out Twinkles" as a highlight, saying the song " has claws that make a valiant effort to rip a hole through your soul." Rolling Stone favorably compared the song to the Smashing Pumpkins, highlighting the vocals of Brian Aubert and Nikki Monninger. Pitchfork was more negative, calling the lyrics "wholly incomprehensible."

== Music video ==
The song's music video was directed by Philip Andelman. The video, shot mostly in black and white, shows the band performing the song.

== Track listing ==
No.	Title	Length
1.	"Well Thought Out Twinkles" (Radio Edit)	3:31
2.	"Mercury"	5:38
3.	"Common Reactor" (Live)	5:11

== Charts ==
Chart (2007)	Peak position
Canada Rock (Billboard)	34
Scottish Singles Sales (Official Charts)	54
UK Singles (Official Charts)	46
US Alternative Airplay (Billboard)	9
