= The Pit (song) =

Single by Silversun Pickups

from the album Neck of the Woods
- Released: September 25, 2012
- Genre: Alternative rock, indie rock, new wave, shoegazing
- Length: 4:39 (album version); 3:44 (radio edit)
- Label: Dangerbird
- Songwriters: Brian Aubert, Christopher Guanlao, Joe Lester, Nikki Monninger
- Producer: Jacknife Lee

Silversun Pickups singles chronology
"Bloody Mary (Nerve Endings)" (2012)	"The Pit" (2012)	"Dots and Dashes (Enough Already)" (2013)

"The Pit" is an indie rock song performed by American alternative rock music group Silversun Pickups. The song was written by Silversun Pickups, and produced by Jacknife Lee. It serves as the second single from their third studio album, Neck of the Woods, which was released on May 8, 2012. The song reached the top five of the Billboard Alternative Songs chart in March 2013, with a peak of number three.

== Personnel ==
- Brian Aubert – guitar, vocals
- Chris Guanlao – drums
- Joe Lester – keys
- Nikki Monninger – bass, vocals

== Chart performance ==
=== Weekly charts ===
Weelky chart performance for "The Pit"
Chart (2012–2013)	Peak position
US Hot Rock & Alternative Songs (Billboard)	31
US Rock & Alternative Airplay (Billboard)	11

=== Year-end charts ===
Year-end chart performance for "The Pit"
Chart (2013)	Position
US Rock Airplay (Billboard)	30
