= Pikul (EP) =

EP by Silversun Pickups
- Released: July 26, 2005
- Recorded: 2005
- Genre: Indie rock
- Length: 47:52 (35:52 without the added silence)
- Label: Dangerbird
- Producer: Rod Cevera

Silversun Pickups chronology
Pikul (2005)	Carnavas (2006)

Professional ratings
Review scores
Source	Rating
AllMusic	3.5/5 stars
Spacelab	3/5 stars
Music Emissions	4.5/5 stars
Music OMH	4/5 stars

Pikul is the debut EP from the Silversun Pickups, released on Dangerbird Records in 2005. The album includes 16 untitled tracks after "...All the Go Inbetweens", all of which are about 44 seconds long each, concealing a hidden track at the end ("Sci-Fi Lullaby"). The album name comes from the nickname of Douglas Lee Kratz, a friend of the group who died in the 2001 Marsh Harbour Cessna 402 crash, and to whom the album is dedicated. The name is commonly pronounced "Pickle", but the correct pronunciation is "pie-kull".

The EP has one music video: "Kissing Families".

In 2009 it was released on vinyl.

"All The Go In Betweens" was recorded at "The Ship" in 2002. "The Fuzz" was recorded at "The Ship" in 2003. "Kissing Families" and "Booksmart Devil" were produced at Clearlake Studio in 2004. "Comeback Kid" and "Creation Lake" were produced at Sunset Sound in 2005. Album was mastered at Capitol Mastering.

"The Fuzz" and "Sci-Fi Lullaby" have only been played live once, "The Fuzz" in 2005 and "Sci-Fi Lullaby" in 2011. "...All the Go Inbetweens" was last played in 2007. "Comeback Kid" was last played in 2008. "Booksmart Devil" was last played in 2009.

"Kissing Families", "Creation Lake" and "Sci-Fi Lullaby" are the only songs from this EP that were played after 2010, with "Kissing Families" being the only one of the three to be played recently, being the 8th most played song and being played as recent as 28 September 2022 while "Creation Lake" was last played in 2013 and is the 36th most played song.

Sample recording of Kissing Families

== Track listing ==
All tracks are written by Silversun Pickups (Brian Aubert, Nikki Monninger, Joe Lester, Christopher Guanlao) except Track 5.

No.	Title	Length
1.	"Kissing Families"	4:50
2.	"Comeback Kid"	4:10
3.	"Booksmart Devil"	4:26
4.	"The Fuzz"	5:54
5.	"Creation Lake" (A cover of a song originally done by the band The Movies.)	3:43
6.	"...All the Go Inbetweens"	7:49
23.	"Sci-Fi Lullaby" (Hidden bonus track)	5:00
Total length:		35:52

- Tracks 7–22 are silence of 45 seconds each.

== Personnel ==
- Brian Aubert – Guitar, Vocals
- Nikki Monninger – Bass Guitar / Backing Vocals
- Joe Lester – Keyboards / Noises [Sounds]
- Christopher Guanlao – Drums
- Mark Chalecki – Mastered By
- Rod Cervera – Producer / Mixer (tracks 1, 2, 3, 5)
- Aaron Espinoza – Recorded By (track 6)
- Brian Thornell – Recorded By (track 4)
- Mel Kadel – Artwork
- Sara Cummings – Artwork [Layout]
- Matt Solodky – Marketing
- Jeff Castelaz – A & R
- Peter Walker – A & R
- Smog Design, Inc. – Layouts
