= Bloody Mary (Nerve Endings) =

Single by Silversun Pickups

from the album Neck of the Woods
- Released: March 25, 2012
- Genre: Alternative rock; shoegazing; dream pop
- Length: 5:10
- Label: Dangerbird
- Songwriters: Brian Aubert; Christopher Guanlao; Joe Lester; Nikki Monninger
- Producer: Jacknife Lee

Silversun Pickups singles chronology
"Broken Bottles" (2011)	"Bloody Mary (Nerve Endings)" (2012)	"The Pit" (2012)

Music video
- "Bloody Mary (Nerve Endings)" on YouTube

"Bloody Mary (Nerve Endings)", often referred to as just "Bloody Mary", is an indie rock song performed by American alternative rock music group Silversun Pickups. The song was written by Silversun Pickups, and produced by Jacknife Lee. It serves as the lead-off single to their third studio album, Neck of the Woods, which was released on May 8, 2012. The song reached the top ten of the Billboard Alternative Songs chart in May 2012, peaking at number seven in June.

== Music video ==
A music video directed by James Frost of The Automatic was released for the song on May 29, 2012.

== Personnel ==
- Brian Aubert – guitar, vocals
- Chris Guanlao – drums
- Joe Lester – keys
- Nikki Monninger – bass, vocals

== Chart performance ==
=== Weekly charts ===
Chart (2012)	Peak position
Belgium (Ultratip Bubbling Under Flanders)	49
US Rock Songs (Billboard)	16
US Alternative Airplay (Billboard)	7

=== Year-end charts ===
Chart (2012)	Peak position
US Rock Songs	42
US Alternative Songs	23
