= Panic Switch =

2009 single by Silversun Pickups

Single by Silversun Pickups

from the album Swoon
- Released: March 17, 2009
- Genre: Indie rock; post-punk revival; nu gaze
- Length: 5:44 (album version); 4:14 (radio edit)
- Label: Dangerbird
- Songwriters: Brian Aubert; Christopher Guanlao; Joe Lester; Nikki Monninger
- Producer: Dave Cooley

Silversun Pickups singles chronology
"Little Lover's So Polite" (2008)	"Panic Switch" (2009)	"Substitution" (2009)

Music video
- "Panic Switch" on YouTube

"Panic Switch" is a song by the American alternative rock band Silversun Pickups. It was released on March 17, 2009 as the lead single from their second studio album, Swoon (2009). The song reached number one on the Billboard Alternative Songs chart, becoming their first number-one single on any Billboard chart.

It was the first song by an independent artist to reach number one on the Alternative chart in 11 years. After a one-week stay at number one, it spent 11 weeks at number two behind Linkin Park's "New Divide". It is also their first Hot 100 entry, peaking at number 92.

== Background ==
When asked about the song, singer Brian Aubert told MTV that the song was added late to the album, almost as an afterthought. It is meant to represent a nervous breakdown, which is a major theme of the album.

== Reception ==
The song was ranked at no. 45 on Consequence of Sound's Every Alternative Rock No. 1 Hit from Worst to Best.

== Use in other media ==
The song appeared in the trailer for Sucker Punch.

In 2012, Mitt Romney's presidential campaign received a cease and desist request from Silversun Pickups, who alleged illegal use of their song at a campaign event set-up in North Carolina. Romney's spokeswoman, Amanda Henneberg, stated that playing the song before the event began was covered under the campaign's regular blanket license and would not play it again.

== Charts ==
=== Weekly charts ===
Weekly chart performance for "Panic Switch"
Chart (2009–2010)	Peak position
Czech Republic Modern Rock (IFPI)	18
Germany (GfK)	73
US Billboard Hot 100	92
US Hot Rock & Alternative Songs (Billboard)	4

=== Year-end charts ===
Year-end chart performance for "Panic Switch"
Chart (2009)	Position
US Hot Rock Songs (Billboard)	5

== Certifications ==
Certifications for "Panic Switch"
Region	Certification	Certified units/sales
United States (RIAA)	Gold	500,000^{‡}
^{‡} Sales+streaming figures based on certification alone.
