= Lazy Eye (Silversun Pickups song) =

Single by Silversun Pickups

from the album Carnavas
- Released: February 2007
- Recorded: Beer Wine Fish, Echo Park; Sunset Sound, Hollywood, California, 2006
- Genre: Indie rock; dream pop; shoegaze
- Length: 5:54
- Label: Dangerbird
- Songwriters: Brian Aubert; Christopher Guanlao; Joe Lester; Nikki Monninger
- Producer: Dave Cooley

Silversun Pickups singles chronology
"Kissing Families" (2006)	"Lazy Eye" (2007)	"Future Foe Scenarios" (2007)

"Lazy Eye" is the first single from Silversun Pickups' debut album Carnavas, written by lead singer and guitarist Brian Aubert. The band performed the song on the Late Show with David Letterman, The Tonight Show with Jay Leno, Later With Jools Holland, and Last Call with Carson Daly.

An alternate version of the song, with a length of 7:27, was played on XMU before the shorter version was played on FM and other XM channels. This version was featured on their demo CD (which featured early versions of four tracks).

== Music video ==
The music video for "Lazy Eye" was directed by Suzie Vlcek and produced by Eric Morgan. Former band member, Kennedy, makes a cameo appearance in the video as a bartender and the band's original drummer, Elvira Gonzalez, makes a cameo appearance as a box office/door attendant.

The video received extensive airplay on MTV, MTV2, MTVU, VH1, Fuse, MuchMusic, MTV (Latin America), International Music Feed and many other international broadcast outlets. The popularity of the video led to the creation of a VH1 "Pop-Up Video" version. The "Lazy Eye" music video was among the MTV2 Subterranean "Viewers Top 20 Music Videos of 2007" list.

=== Personnel ===
- Director: Suzie Vlcek
- Producer: Eric Morgan
- Cinematographer: Joe Pugliese
- Editor: Jonathan Alberts
- Cast: Sara Grace Powell, Hank May, Filippo Almonde
- Cameos: Kennedy, Elvira Gonzalez

== Charts ==
=== Weekly charts ===
Weekly chart performance for "Lazy Eye"
Chart (2007)	Peak position
Canada Hot 100 (Billboard)	44
Canada Rock (Billboard)	7
Scotland Singles (OCC)	73
UK Physical Singles (OCC)	55
US Bubbling Under Hot 100 (Billboard)	2
US Alternative Airplay (Billboard)	5
US Pop 100 (Billboard)	91

=== Year-end charts ===
Year-end chart performance for "Lazy Eye"
Chart (2007)	Position
US Alternative Songs (Billboard)	17

== Certifications ==
Certifications for "Lazy Eye"
Region	Certification	Certified units/sales
United States (RIAA)	2× Platinum	2,000,000^{‡}
^{‡} Sales+streaming figures based on certification alone.
