= Butch Vig production discography =

The discography of Butch Vig, an American musician and record producer, consists of a mix of albums, extended plays and singles released by bands he was a performer in and records on which he produced, mixed, remixed, engineered or a combination of those roles.

After graduating from the University of Wisconsin with a degree in film studies, Vig became a core member of cult Mid-West band Spooner, and an offshoot group Fire Town, as well as co-founding recording studio Smart Studios in Madison, Wisconsin in the Eighties. Vig is now best known internationally as the drummer of the Madison-based alternative rock band Garbage and the producer of multi-platinum selling albums Nevermind by Nirvana and Siamese Dream by The Smashing Pumpkins.

Vig's production, Green Day's 21st Century Breakdown, debuted at #1 on the Billboard 200 and atop the album charts of 23 further countries.

== Performer ==
Year	Album	Artist	Producer	
1982	Every Corner Dance (1982)	Spooner	Gary Klebe and Spooner	
1982	Every Corner Dance (1982)	Spooner	Spooner	Gary Klebe and Spooner
1984	Go Back to Chicago/The Undergrad Pickup Rag (1984)	A.L. Kammen and Bachelor Pad/Butch Vig, drums (uncredited)	Spooner	
1987	In the Heart of the Heart Country (1987)	Fire Town	Fire Town	
1988	The Good Life (1989)	Fire Town	Michael Frondelli	
1990	The Fugitive Dance (1991)	Spooner	Doug Erikson and Butch Vig	
1994	Garbage (1995)	Garbage	Garbage	
1997	Version 2.0 (1998)	Garbage	Garbage	
2000	Beautiful Garbage (2001)	Garbage	Garbage	
2004	Bleed Like Me (2005)	Garbage	Garbage (Mixed by Butch Vig)	
2007	Absolute Garbage (2007)	Garbage	Garbage	
2012	Emperors of Wyoming (2012)	Emperors of Wyoming	Emperors of Wyoming	
2012	Not Your Kind of People (2012)	Garbage	Garbage	
2016	Strange Little Birds (2016)	Garbage	Garbage	
2017	5 Billion In Diamonds (2017)	5 Billion In Diamonds	5 Billion In Diamonds	
2021	No Gods No Masters (2021)	Garbage	Garbage; Shirley Manson; Duke Erikson; Steve Marker; Vig	

Vig also wrote and recorded the theme tune for the Green Bay Packers, "Go Pack Go!", under the band name The 6 Packers.

== Music production ==
=== Production ===
The following studio albums were produced, or co-produced by Vig, many at his own recording studio:

Year	Album	Artist
1983	Hollywood Autopsy (1983)	Hollywood Autopsy
1983	Acceptance (1983)	Mecht Mensch
1983	Face the Music (1983)	Tar Babies
1984	Intellectuals Are the Shoeshine Boys of the Ruling Elite^{[A]} (1984)	Killdozer
1984	no enemy (1984)	Juvenile Truth
1985	Snake Boy (1985)	Killdozer
1985	1st E.P. (1985)	Ivory Library
1985	Living in the Mirror (1986)	The Other Kids
1986	Burl^{[B]} (1986)	Killdozer
1986	Happy Home^{[E]} (1987)	The Other Kids
1987	Little Baby Buntin' (1987)	Killdozer
1987	Come Down to the Merry Go Round (1987)	Laughing Hyenas
1988	Century Days (1988)	Die Kreuzen
1989	Suction (1989)	feedtime
1989	Twelve Point Buck (1989)	Killdozer
1989	For Ladies Only (1989)	Killdozer
1989	You Can't Pray a Lie (1989)	Laughing Hyenas
1989	Gone Away (1989)	Die Kreuzen
1990	Life of Crime (1990)	Laughing Hyenas
1990	Ground Into The Dirt (1990)	King Snake Roost
1991	Gish^{[C]} (1991)	The Smashing Pumpkins
1991	Nevermind (1991)	Nirvana
1991	Cement (1991)	Die Kreuzen
1991	8-Way Santa (1991)	Tad
	Flipped Out In Singapore (1992)	Chainsaw Kittens
	Pick Up Heaven (1992)	Drain
1992	Bricks are Heavy (1992)	L7
1992	Overwhelming Colorfast (1992)	Overwhelming Colorfast
1992	Dirty (1992)	Sonic Youth
1993	Siamese Dream^{[C]} (1993)	The Smashing Pumpkins
1994	Experimental Jet Set, Trash and No Star (1994)	Sonic Youth
1994	This Perfect World (1994)	Freedy Johnston
1995	Let Your Dim Light Shine (1995)	Soul Asylum
2003	Sing the Sorrow^{[D]} (2003)	AFI
2006	New Wave (2006)	Against Me!
2007	Chase This Light (2007)	Jimmy Eat World
2007	All or Nothing (2008)	The Subways
2007	Heart Burns (2008)	Laura Jane Grace
2008	21st Century Breakdown (2009)	Green Day
2009	White Crosses (2010)	Against Me!
2010	Harmony (2010)	Never Shout Never
2010	Wasting Light (2011)	Foo Fighters
2013	Sound City: Real to Reel (2013)	Various
2014	Sonic Highways (2014)	Foo Fighters
2019	Widow’s Weeds (2019)	Silversun Pickups
2022	Physical Thrills (2022)	Silversun Pickups

A Co-produced by Butch Vig and Steve Marker.
B Co-produced by Butch Vig and Corey Rusk.
C Co-produced by Butch Vig and Billy Corgan.
D Co-produced by Butch Vig and Jerry Finn.
E Co-produced by Butch Vig and Steve Watson.

The following individual tracks were produced by Vig for various projects:

Year	Track	Artist	Appears on
2000	"Totalimmortal"	The Offspring	Me, Myself and Irene O.S.T. (2000)
2000	"Bloodstains"	The Offspring	Ready to Rumble O.S.T. (2000)
2002	"Telling You Now"	Jessy Moss	Street Knuckles (2003)
2002	"Pick a Card"	Jessy Moss	Street Knuckles (2003)
2002	"I'll Manage"	Jessy Moss	Street Knuckles (2003)
2003	"Rabbits are Roadkill on Rt. 37"	AFI	Decemberunderground (2006)
2009	"Wheels"	Foo Fighters	Greatest Hits (2009)
2009	"Word Forward"	Foo Fighters	Greatest Hits (2009)
2010	"Neutron Star Collision (Love Is Forever)"	Muse	The Twilight Saga – Eclipse: Original Motion Picture Soundtrack (2010)

=== Mixing ===
Year	Album	Artist
2004	Bleed Like Me^{[A]} (2005)	Garbage

Year	Track	Artist	Appears on
1999	"Jesus Says"	Ash	Nu-Clear Sounds (U.S. Version) (1999) and Intergalactic Sonic 7″s (2002)
1999	"Wild Surf"	Ash	Nu-Clear Sounds (U.S. Version) (1999) and Intergalactic Sonic 7″s (2002)
1999	"Folk Song"	Ash	Nu-Clear Sounds (U.S Version) (1999)
2007	"Tell Me Where It Hurts"^{[A]}	Garbage	Absolute Garbage (2007)
2007	"Betcha"^{[A]}	Garbage	"Tell Me Where It Hurts" (2007)
2007	"All the Good in this Life"^{[A]}	Garbage	Songs for Tibet: The Art of Peace (2008)
2008	"Witness to Your Love"^{[A]}	Garbage	Give Listen Help: Volume 5 (2008)

A Mixed credited to Vig, independent of Garbage.

=== Remixes ===
Year	Track	Artist	Appears on
1992	"Throw This Away"	Nine Inch Nails	Fixed (1992)
1992	"Last" (Butch Vig remix)"	Nine Inch Nails	Unreleased (available from remix.nin.com)^{[D]}
1992	"Shamrocks and Shenanigans (Butch Vig remix)"	House of Pain	House of Pain (1992)
1992	"It's You (Crash and Burn mix)"	EMF	"It's You" (1992)
1993	"She Sells Sanctuary (Sundance)"	The Cult	Sanctuary MCMXCIII: Volume Two (1993)
1993	"In Your Room (Zephyr mix)"	Depeche Mode	"In Your Room" (1994) and The Singles 86>98 (1998)
1997	"Jack-Ass (Butch Vig mix)"	Beck	"Jack-Ass" (1997)
1997	"Jack-Ass (Lowrider mix)"	Beck	"Jack-Ass" (1997)
1997	"Staring at the Sun (Monster Truck mix)"^{[A]}	U2	"Staring at the Sun" (1997)
1997	"Staring at the Sun (Lab Rat mix)"^{[A]}	U2	"Staring at the Sun" (1997)
1997	"Dirty Day (Junk Day)" ^{[B]}	U2	"Please" (1997) and The Best of 1990–2000 (2000)
1997	"Dirty Day (Bitter Kiss)" ^{[B]}	U2	"Please" (1997)
1998	"Freak on a Leash (Freakin' Bitch mix)"	Korn	"Freak on a Leash" (1999)
1999	"Make Me Bad (Sickness in Salvation mix)"	Korn	"Make Me Bad" (2000)
1999	"So Pure (Pure Ecstacy mix)"	Alanis Morissette	"So Pure" (1999)
2000	"How About Some Hardcore (GrungeIsDead.com remix)"	Butch Vig & M.O.P.	Loud Rocks (2000)
2001	"Nookie (Androids vs. Las Putas Remix)"	Limp Bizkit	New Old Songs (2001)
2007	"Bad Boyfriend (Sting Like a Bee remix)"^{[C]}	Garbage	"Tell Me Where It Hurts" and Absolute Garbage (2007)

Notes:

- All remixes are credited to Butch Vig, except A credited to Butch Vig and Danny Saber and B credited to Butch Vig and Doug Erikson. C remixed by Butch Vig, independent of Garbage.
- D This remix has never been commercially released, however elements from the remix were incorporated into "Throw This Away". It was found in the early '90s on an FTP server as an 8-bit/22,050 Hz AIFF file, and then circulated on P2P until Trent Reznor hosted a WAV file of the remix online.
