= J. Shimon & J. Lindemann =

American artist duo

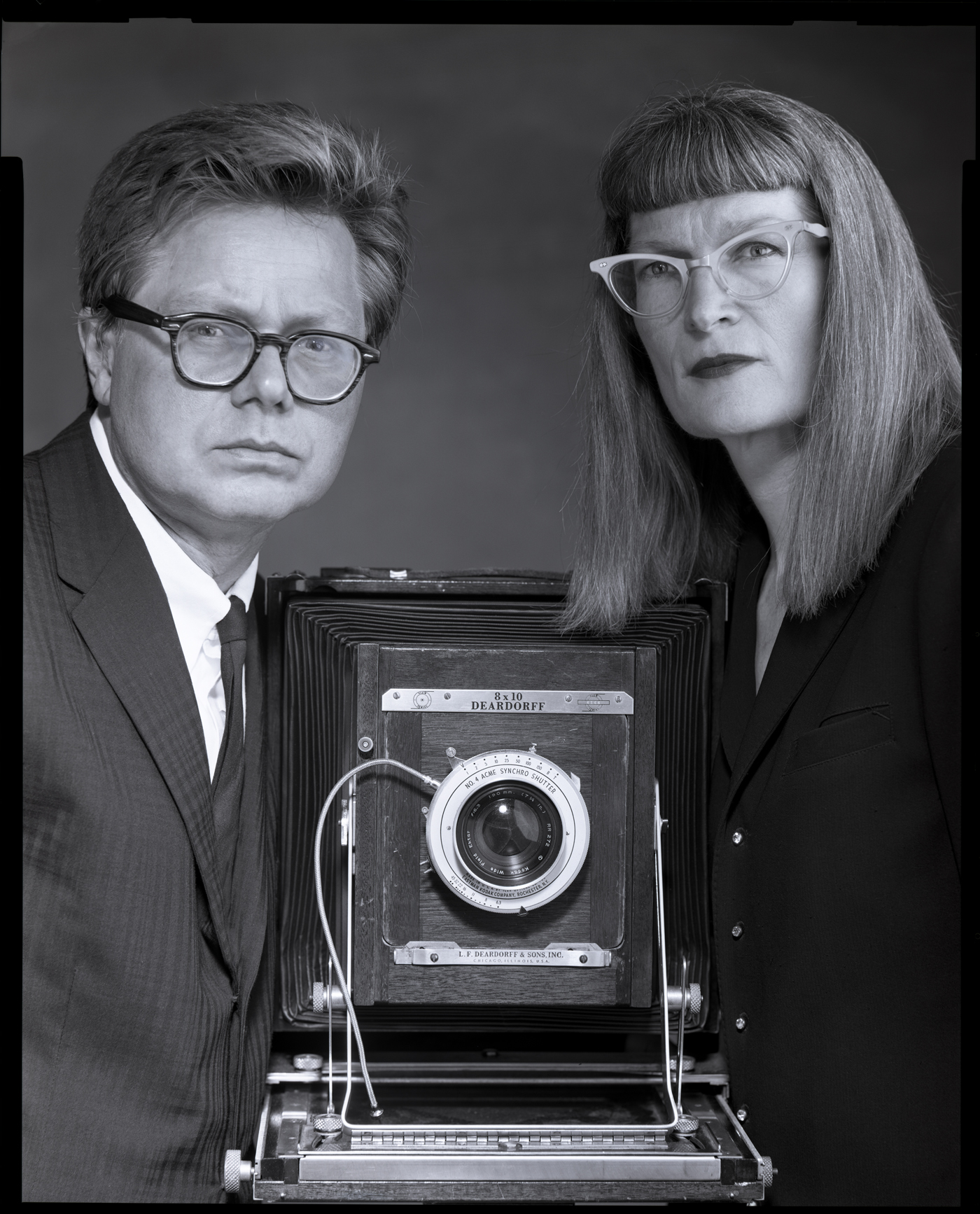
J. Shimon & J. Lindemann self-portrait with 8×10 Deardorff view camera in their Manitowoc, Wisconsin studio, 2009

John Shimon (born July 10, 1961) and Julie Lindemann (September 14, 1957 – August 25, 2015) are American artists who worked together as the collaborative duo J. Shimon & J. Lindemann. Shimon continues to work and teach at Lawrence University. They were born in Manitowoc, Wisconsin, and are best known for their photographs about human existence in the Midwest made using antiquarian photographic processes.

== Early lives and education ==
Shimon and Lindemann grew up in rural Manitowoc County, Wisconsin, and met as undergraduates at the University of Wisconsin-Madison (1979–1983). Shimon majored in art and Lindemann in journalism. Shimon and Lindemann's first collaborative project, Hollywood Autopsy, was a band formed during their time in college with Bob Wasserman and Cyndee Baudhuin. Performing mainly at nightclubs in Madison, Hollywood Autopsy played shows with touring bands such as The Replacements, Killdozer, Hüsker Dü, X, and The Gun Club. They recorded a self-titled LP record in 1983 and then disbanded. Butch Vig at Smart Studios recorded the vocals and completed the mixdown. Little Big Chief Records reissued the LP in 2014 due to growing public interest in private press records.

== Early projects (1983-1988) ==
Shimon and Lindemann moved to Jersey City Heights, New Jersey in 1983 and spent their free time exploring New York City art museums and galleries, bookstores, and the East Village art scene. In 1984, they relocated to Milwaukee, Wisconsin to pursue photography and writing projects about their native Wisconsin. Their first collaborative photography project as J. Shimon & J. Lindemann was St. Nazianz. It focused on prominent citizens of the rural village of St. Nazianz, Wisconsin near where Lindemann grew up. Black-and-white Rolleiflex portraits and 4×5 view camera architectural studies from the series, along with artifacts collected from the subjects, were installed at the Madison Museum of Contemporary Art in 1988. Subsequent photography projects included The Elders (1988) and Salon Portraits (1989) consisting of studio and on-site portraits of creative types and cultural leaders in Milwaukee. They frequently contributed photo essays to Milwaukee-based Art Muscle Magazine (1987-1994) and also Milwaukee Magazine (1987-1993) where they collaborated with writer Jim Romensko. Based on these projects, J. Shimon & J. Lindemann were admitted to a master’s program at Illinois State University in Normal, Illinois where they worked with the photographer Rhondal McKinney and contributed to the university’s Rural Documentary Photography Project (1988-1989).

== Manitowoc years (1989-2011) ==
Upon completing their master’s degrees, J. Shimon & J. Lindemann returned to Manitowoc, Wisconsin in 1989 where they established their studio in a 19th-century warehouse/storefront building near Lake Michigan. This studio and living space, with a downtown location, became the focus of their lives and art practice. Using the storefront to show contemporary art, they operated Neo-Post-Now Gallery (1992-1997) featuring artists from the region and the rest of the country . The large warehouse portion served as a formal studio space, office, and living area. They photographed Manitowoc teenagers interested in punk rock and art and teenagers living on farms in nearby rural areas. They used 8×10 Deardorff and 12×20 Banquet view cameras. These photographs were exhibited as Midwestern Rebellion (1994), Town and County (1997), and Pictures of Non-Famous People (1998).

Throughout the 1990s, J. Shimon & J. Lindemann did editorial portraiture on assignment for Fortune, The New York Times Magazine, New York, and People. They contributed cover and interior photographs for books by Michael Perry including his memoirs Population 485, Coop, and Visiting Tom. In 2004, their book Season’s Gleamings: The Art of the Aluminum Christmas Tree renewed public appreciation for the Aluminum Christmas trees mass-produced in Manitowoc in the early 1960s.

In 2000, they set about making an experimental documentary film, exhibition, and book, One Million Years is Like Three Seconds, using a Bolex and outdated gelatin silver paper to examine how the technological changes of the 20th century affected four Wisconsin men who lived through them. A 2008 exhibition and catalog, Unmasked & Anonymous: Shimon & Lindemann Consider Portraiture, at the Milwaukee Art Museum juxtaposed Shimon and Lindemann's portraits of Wisconsin people with portraits from the Museum's collection curated in collaboration with Lisa Hostetler. Their interest in collecting and studying real photo postcards led them to use vintage postcard photographic equipment to make studio portraits resulting in the Real Photo Postcard Survey exhibition, blog, and catalog presented at the Portrait Society Gallery, Milwaukee, Wisconsin in 2010. A related series of landscapes and architectural studies formed The Wisconsin Project with a blog where they post “found” and “made” postcard images.

== Academic career ==
J. Shimon & J. Lindemann began teaching photography courses collaboratively at the Milwaukee Institute of Art & Design in 1989. They also taught at the University of Wisconsin-Madison, The School of the Art Institute of Chicago, and Lawrence University where they were granted tenure in 2008. They received the Lawrence University Excellence in Creative Activity Award in 2012.

== Later projects (2012-present) ==
J. Shimon & J. Lindemann's subject matter continued to center on people and places in Wisconsin, obsolete technologies, and vernacular photographic forms. In 2011, they moved their art practice from Manitowoc to Appleton, Wisconsin. They produced an exhibition called Decay Utopia Decay installed at the Portrait Society Gallery in 2012 featuring self-portraits made at their farm property with a 30×36 large format camera built by Shimon. Just days before the exhibition opening, Lindemann was diagnosed with metastatic cancer. Despite this, they completed work on We Go From Where we Know, an exhibition consisting of photographs, paintings, sculpture, and found objects, at the John Michael Kohler Arts Center, Sheboygan, Wisconsin in 2013. A Wisconsin-made 1949 Nash Motors Ambassador filled with hand cast concrete corncobs and an installation of hundreds of vintage postcards of Wisconsin were key elements. A large retrospective showed at the Museum of Wisconsin Art in early 2015.

== J. Shimon & J. Lindemann Archive Trust ==
Since 2012, they have been working to organize the J. Shimon & J. Lindemann Archive Trust. The archive consists of approximately 65,000 negatives and transparencies and 5,500 signed prints made by J. Shimon & J. Lindemann using analog photographic processes including ambrotype, Cibachrome, cyanotype, gelatin silver, gum bichromate, platinum/palladium, and tintype.

== Awards ==
- Excellence in Creative Activity Award in 2012, Lawrence University.
- Wisconsin Artists of the Year Award 2014, Milwaukee Journal Sentinel.

== Publications ==
- Season’s Gleamings: The Art of the Aluminum Christmas Tree (afterword by Tom Vanderbilt), Melcher Media, NY (2004)
- Unmasked & Anonymous: Shimon & Lindemann Consider Portraiture (introduction by Lisa Hostetler), Milwaukee Art Museum, Milwaukee, WI (2008)
- Real Photo Postcard Survey Project (essay by Debra Brehmer), Portrait Society Gallery, Milwaukee, WI (2010)
- Visiting Tom by Michael Perry, Harper Collins, NY (2012)
- There's a Place (essays by Debra Brehmer, Rachele Krivichi, Dan Leers, Graeme Reid), Museum of Wisconsin Art, WI (2015)
