= October File =

October File may refer to:

- October File (album), a 1986 album by Die Kreuzen
- October File (band), a British post-punk band, named after the Die Kreuzen album
