= 100% (Sonic Youth song) =

1992 single by Sonic Youth

Single by Sonic Youth

from the album Dirty
- B-side: "Crème Brûlée"; "Genetic"; "Hendrix Necro"
- Released: June 29, 1992
- Recorded: Early 1992
- Studio: Magic Shop, New York City
- Genre: Noise rock; experimental rock; art punk
- Length: 2:28
- Label: DGC
- Songwriter: Sonic Youth
- Producers: Butch Vig; Sonic Youth

Sonic Youth singles chronology
"Dirty Boots" (1991)	"100%" (1992)	"Youth Against Fascism" (1992)

Music video
- "100%" on YouTube

"100%" is a song by the American rock band Sonic Youth from their seventh studio album, Dirty (1992). It was released as the lead single from the album on June 29, 1992, by DGC Records. Written by Sonic Youth, the song discusses the murder of Joe Cole, a friend of the band who was killed in an armed robbery on December 19, 1991.

== Recording ==
The song was recorded and produced in early 1992 at Magic Shop in New York City by Butch Vig and Sonic Youth. Vig also engineered the song, with assistance from Edward Douglas.

== Critical reception ==
Greg Kot of the Chicago Tribune praised the song's "garage-rock power chords", in addition to designating it as "a great single". Dele Fadele of NME said the song "sets the tone perfectly for Dirty's loving seedy, political and romantic take on classic rock n roll - an Exile On Main Street for the '90s". Scott Hreha of Pitchfork spoke positively of the confrontational lyrical content of "100%", describing the song, alongside "JC", as "elegiac tributes to murdered friends". Uncut praised the radio-friendly nature of the song, referring to it as "contagious grunge-pop".

== Chart performance ==
In the United States, "100%” debuted at number 22 on the Alternative Airplay chart for the issue dated July 18, 1992. Within five weeks, the song reached its peak position of number four, becoming Sonic Youth's highest charting song on the chart. The song spent a total of 13 weeks on the chart.

== Music video ==
The music video for "100%" was directed by Tamra Davis and Spike Jonze, and shot in Los Angeles. Much of the video footage was shot by Jonze while riding on a skateboard, following others in the streets (including then-skateboarder, now-actor Jason Lee). The video also alluded to the shooting death of Cole, but is not specifically about him, and more about friendship between two skateboarders. Sonic Youth is shown playing a house party throughout the film. Kim Gordon plays a yellow Fender bass guitar, which she borrowed from actor Keanu Reeves.

The video received its world premiere on MTV's alternative rock program 120 Minutes on July 12, 1992.

=== Ban ===
In the music video, Kim Gordon dons a counterfeit The Rolling Stones T-shirt with the phrase “Eat me” written across the front. This phrase was deemed as too obscene for MTV, resulting in the video being banned from the network. Gordon responded to the banning: “It's a bootleg Rolling Stones shirt — the big mouth — and it said 'Eat me' on it. At the time, I just took it, like, ‘Well, that's confusing’, because they've obviously got, like, mostly naked women in their videos”.

== Live performances ==
On September 4, 1992, Sonic Youth performed the song on Late Night with David Letterman.

== Cover versions ==
“100%” was covered by Mantar on their fourth studio album, Grungetown Hooligans II (2020). Matthis Van Der Meulen directed an accompanying music video, which acts as an homage to the original music video released by Sonic Youth.

== Track listings and formats ==
- 12" and 10" vinyl, cassette, and CD single
1. "100%" (LP version) – 2:28
2. "Crème Brûlée" (LP version) – 2:33
3. "Genetic" – 3:34
4. "Hendrix Necro" – 2:49
- 7" vinyl
1. "100%" (LP Version) – 2:28
2. "Crème Brûlée" (LP version) – 2:33

== Charts ==
Chart performance for "100%"
Chart (1992)	Peak position
Australia (ARIA)	67
Australia Alternative (ARIA)	2
New Zealand (Recorded Music NZ)	30
UK Singles (Official Charts)	28
US Alternative Airplay (Billboard)	4

== Release history ==
Release dates and formats for "100%"
Region	Date	Format(s)	Label(s)	Ref.
Australia	June 29, 1992	CD; cassette	DGC	
United Kingdom	June 29, 1992	12-inch vinyl; CD; cassette	DGC	
