= Sugar Kane =

1993 single by Sonic Youth

Single by Sonic Youth

from the album Dirty
- B-side: "The End Of The End Of The Ugly" multiple
- Released: March 22, 1993
- Recorded: 1992
- Genre: Alternative rock
- Length: 5:56
- Label: DGC
- Songwriters: Kim Gordon, Thurston Moore, Lee Ranaldo, Steve Shelley
- Producers: Butch Vig, Sonic Youth

Sonic Youth singles chronology
"Youth Against Fascism" (1992)	"Sugar Kane" (1993)	"Drunken Butterfly" (1993)

"Sugar Kane" is a song by the American rock band Sonic Youth's from their seventh studio album, Dirty (1992). It was released as the third single from the album on March 22, 1993, by Geffen Records. It was also featured in the End of Days soundtrack.

== Music video ==
The music video for Sugar Kane was directed by Nick Egan. The video was shot in New York City and portrayed Sonic Youth performing in the midst of a fashion show that showcased "grunge" clothing. The clothing, in fact, was one of the collections ("Grunge Collection") done by Marc Jacobs for Perry Ellis in 1992. Jacobs was a close friend of bassist Kim Gordon and the band. The video also marked the first film appearance of Chloë Sevigny.

== Track listings and formats ==
- Canadian and United States CD single
1. "Sugar Kane" (Edit) – 4:58
2. "The Destroyed Room" – 3:19
3. "Purr" (Acoustic/Mark Goodier Version) – 4:55
4. "The End of the End of the Ugly" – 4:10
- UK 10" vinyl, EU 12" vinyl, and UK CD single
1. "Sugar Kane" (The Short and Sweet Version) – 4:58
2. "Is It My Body" – 2:52
3. "Personality Crisis" – 3:48
4. "The End of the End of the Ugly" – 4:10
- UK cassette
1. "Sugar Kane" (The Short and Sweet Version) – 4:58
2. "The End of the End of the Ugly" – 4:10

== Charts ==
Chart performance for "Sugar Kane"
Chart (1993)	Peak position
Australia Alternative (ARIA)	8
UK Singles (Official Charts)	26

== Release history ==
Release dates and formats for "Sugar Kane"
Region	Date	Format(s)	Label(s)	Ref.
United Kingdom	March 22, 1993	10-inch vinyl; CD; cassette	Geffen	
Australia	April 19, 1993	12-inch vinyl; CD	Geffen	
