= Gone Away =

Gone Away may refer to:

- Gone Away (EP), by Die Kreuzen, 1989
- "Gone Away" (song) from Ixnay on the Hombre by The Offspring, 1997
- Goneaway National Park, a park in Central West Queensland, Australia
- "Gone Away", a storyline in the science fiction comedy webtoon series Live with Yourself!
