= IfIHadAHiFi =

American noise rock band

IfIHadAHifi
- Origin: Milwaukee, Wisconsin, United States
- Genres: Noise rock; post-punk
- Years active: 2000–present
- Labels: Latest Flame, No Karma
- Members: Dr. Awkward; Mr. Alarm; Yale Delay; Rev. Ever (2007–present)
- Past members: Noise Lesion (2000–2001); Reno Loner (2001–2007)
- Website: Official website

IfIHadAHiFi is a noise rock band from Milwaukee, Wisconsin. The group originally formed in Central Wisconsin in 2000, following the breakup of the band The Pop Machine. Following the style of the band's name, each member took a palindrome as a pseudonym: DrAwkward (drums), MrAlarm (bass, synthesizer, guitar) and YaleDelay (guitar). All three founding members share vocals.

Shortly after forming, they expanded to a quartet with the addition of their first fourth member NoiseLesion (synthesizer, keyboards, sampling). In 2001, shortly after the release of their first album Ones and Zeroes NoiseLesion was replaced by RenoLoner (synthesizer, guitar) who played on No More Music (2004) and Hot Nuggets (2006). In 2007, RenoLoner was replaced by RevEver (synthesizer, guitar, keyboards, bass) playing on Fame By Proxy (2008), Nada Surf (2012), Songs From Sexy Results: Cedar Block's Dig for the Higgs and How the Quest Was Won (2012), and We're Never Going Home (2019).

== History ==
In 2001, IfIHadAHiFi released Ones and Zeroes, their debut album, on Milwaukee's No Karma Records. The album was reviewed favorably in Pitchfork, Milk Magazine, Splendid and Slide the Needle. It was after this album that NoiseLesion left the band and RenoLoner joined the group. Shortly afterwards, the group began regularly touring the US.

Their second album, No More Music, was released on No Karma in 2004. It received strong reviews from Rockpile, Read Magazine (where it was an Editor's Pick), Devil in the Woods, Skyscraper, and Splendid. Following No More Music, Alternative Press named IfIHadAHiFi as one of their "Bands You Need to Know" in 2005.

Crustacean Records released Hot Nuggets!, an IfIHadAHiFi/Modern Machines split CD/LP, in 2006. Each band performed six songs – one new song, one cover of the other band, and four additional covers.

In 2007, RenoLoner was replaced by RevEver and the group started work on a planned EP, Tragedy Breeds Success, throughout 2006 and 2007, but these recordings were shelved in favor of a new album. Fame By Proxy was recorded in late 2007 and released the following year on Latest Flame Records.

While writing new material, the band learned that Nada Surf had named their next album If I Had a Hi-Fi; in return, IfIHadAHiFi announced that their next album, planned for 2011 but finally released in January 2012, would be titled Nada Surf.

At Die Kreuzen's 2011 induction into the Wisconsin Area Music Industry (WAMI) Hall of Fame, they cited IfIHadAHiFi as a current band that they thought "should be in consideration for a WAMI."

During the massive Madison protests against Wisconsin governor Scott Walker, the band quickly released a single titled "Imperial Walker," with all proceeds from the sale going to benefit Progressives United.

IfIHadAHiFi was prominently featured in the Cedar Block show Sexy Results: Cedar Block's Dig for the Higgs and How the Quest Was Won, for which they composed and performed six brand-new songs. The songs were also recorded and released as a digital download, as well as a handful of hand-dubbed cassette tapes.

The band released We're Never Going Home in 2019 and won a WAMI award in response to it as "Punk Artist" of the year by the Wisconsin Area Music Industry. They had accepted an invitation to play the WAMI Awards ceremony, but the ceremony was cancelled and the winners were not announced until 18 months later.

== Discography ==
- Ones and Zeroes (No Karma Recordings, June 2001)
- No More Music (Contraphonic / No Karma Recordings, March 2004)
- Hot Nuggets! Split LP with the Modern Machines (Crustacean Records, April 2006)
- Fame by Proxy (Latest Flame Records, September 2008)
- Nada Surf EP+3 (Latest Flame Records, January 2012)
- Songs from Sexy Results: Cedar Block's Dig for the Higgs and How the Quest Was Won EP (February 2012)
- We're Never Going Home (May 2019)
- Paws in the Bacon Grease EP (October 2025)
- Night Vision Creeps EP (November 2025)
