= Uncompromising War on Art Under the Dictatorship of the Proletariat =

Studio album by Killdozer
- Released: 1994
- Recorded: 1993
- Genre: Noise rock
- Length: 47:27
- Label: Touch and Go
- Producer: Brian Paulson

Killdozer chronology
For Ladies Only (1989)	Uncompromising War on Art Under the Dictatorship of the Proletariat (1994)	God Hears Pleas of the Innocent (1995)

Uncompromising War on Art Under the Dictatorship of the Proletariat is an album by the American band Killdozer. It was released in 1994 through Touch and Go Records. The CD version includes all the tracks from their 1986 Burl EP, except with the EP's vinyl release sides reversed. The band promoted the album with a North American tour.

The band put forth their politics with satire and humor. "Enemy of the People" criticizes Wal-Mart. "Turkey Shoot" is an antiwar song.

== Critical reception ==
Professional ratings
Review scores
Source	Rating
AllMusic	2.5/5 stars

The Washington City Paper wrote: "Killdozer's meanest of mean rock ain't for everyone, but if 'Knuckles the Dog (Who Helps People)' doesn’t cause you to shed a tear, you really are a heartless bastard."

== Track listing ==
All tracks are written by Killdozer, except "Hot n' Nasty" by Black Oak Arkansas.

Side one
No.	Title	Length
1.	"Final Market"	4:04
2.	"Knuckles the Dog (Who Helps People)"	5:15
3.	"Turkey Shoot"	3:19
4.	"Grandma Smith Said a Curious Thing"	2:04
5.	"Hot n' Nasty"	3:59
6.	"Peach Pie"	5:29

Side two
No.	Title	Length
1.	"Enemy of the People"	3:15
2.	"Earl Scheib"	3:31
3.	"Das Kapital"	4:09
4.	"The Pig Was Cool"	5:37
5.	"Working Hard, or Hardly Working?"	6:38

CD version
No.	Title	Length
12.	"Hamburger Martyr"	3:20
13.	"Cranberries"	3:45
14.	"Slackjaw"	2:35
15.	"Hottentot"	2:10
16.	"One for the People"	3:34
17.	"I'm Not Lisa"	2:27

== Personnel ==
Killdozer

- Michael Gerald – vocals, bass guitar
- Dan Hobson – drums
- Paul Zagoras – guitar

Production and additional personnel

- Brian Paulson – production, mixing
