= Youth Against Fascism =

1992 single by Sonic Youth

Single by Sonic Youth

from the album Dirty
- B-side: "The Destroyed Room", "Purr" (Mark Goodier version), "Youth Against Fascism (LP Version)"
- Released: October 26, 1992
- Genre: Alternative rock, noise rock
- Label: DGC
- Songwriters: Kim Gordon, Thurston Moore, Lee Ranaldo, Steve Shelley, Ian MacKaye

Sonic Youth singles chronology
"100%" (1992)	"Youth Against Fascism" (1992)	"Sugar Kane" (1993)

"Youth Against Fascism" is a song by the American rock band Sonic Youth from their seventh studio album, Dirty (1992). It was released as the second single from the album on October 26, 1992, by Geffen Records.

== Background ==
Ian MacKaye of Minor Threat and Fugazi contributed additional guitar parts to the track.

The line "I believe Anita Hill" referred to the controversy surrounding the 1991 appointment of Judge Clarence Thomas to the Supreme Court over allegations of sexual harassment from Hill, a former subordinate.

== Track listing ==
1. "Youth Against Fascism (Clean-Ex Mix)"
2. "The Destroyed Room"
3. "Purr (Mark Goodier Version)"
4. "Youth Against Fascism (LP Version)"

The semi-acoustic "Purr" was taken from a Mark Goodier BBC session from July 20, 1992. A live version of "The Destroyed Room" was previously released on the "Dirty Boots" single under the title "The Bedroom".

== Music video ==
The music video for "Youth Against Fascism" was directed by Nick Egan. The video was shot in the concrete flood control channel of the Los Angeles River, with the band playing while FMX bikers ride around. Imagery of fascism, Nazism and communism was spliced into the video.

== Reception ==
In 2017, Paste listed "Youth Against Fascism" at No. 13 on a list of The 15 Best Anti-Fascist Songs.

== Charts ==
Chart performance for "Youth Against Fascism"
Chart (1992)	Peak position
Australia Alternative (ARIA)	4
UK Singles (Official Charts)	52

== Release history ==
Release dates and formats for "Youth Against Fascism"
Region	Date	Format(s)	Label(s)	Ref.
United Kingdom	October 26, 1992	7-inch vinyl; 10-inch vinyl; 12-inch vinyl; CD	Geffen	
Australia	November 2, 1992	CD; cassette	Geffen	
