= Dennis Cole =

American actor (1940–2009)

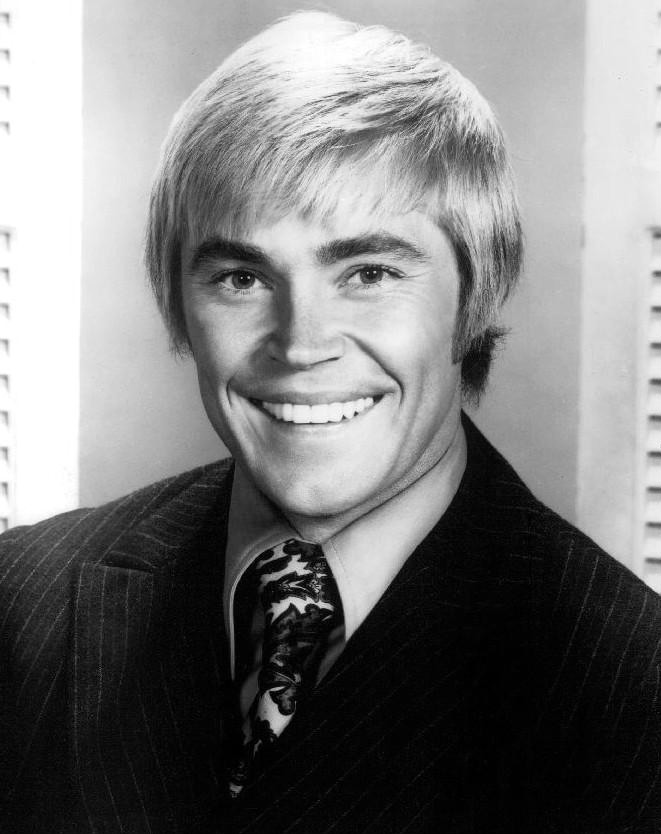
- Cole in 1971
- Born: July 19, 1940; Detroit, Michigan, U.S.
- Died: November 15, 2009 (aged 69); Fort Lauderdale, Florida, U.S.
- Occupation: Actor
- Years active: 1961–2006
- Spouses: Sally Bergeron (m. 1960; div. 1965) Jaclyn Smith (m. 1978; div. 1981) Marjorie Fritz (m. 2004; div. 2008)
- Children: Joe Cole

Dennis Lee Cole (July 19, 1940 – November 15, 2009) was an American film and television actor. Cole worked mostly in television, with numerous guest appearances in the 1960s and 1970s. After the 1991 murder of his only son, Joe Cole, he became an activist who spoke against violence on television.

== Career ==
Cole began performing in his native Detroit and moved to Los Angeles in the 1960s. His bleached-blond, athletic look of a quintessential California surfer earned him the attention of physique magazines. He worked as a model and stuntman before making the transition to acting. His first big acting break came when he landed a starring role in the police drama Felony Squad, which ran from 1966 to 1969. He appeared for one season (1969–1970) as Davey Evans in Bracken's World. He co-starred with Rod Taylor in the TV series Bearcats! (1971) and played Lance Prentiss on the TV soap series The Young and the Restless (1981–82).

Cole made guest appearances in numerous television series, such as Medical Center, Police Story, Charlie's Angels, Vega$, The Feather and Father Gang, The Eddie Capra Mysteries, The Love Boat, The Streets of San Francisco, Fantasy Island, Three's Company, Divorce Court, and Murder, She Wrote. Cole's film career included roles in Cave-In! (1983), Wheels of Fire (1985), Pretty Smart (1987), and the horror film Zombie Death House (1987). Cole's last television appearance was a 1998 episode of Pacific Blue.

== Personal life ==
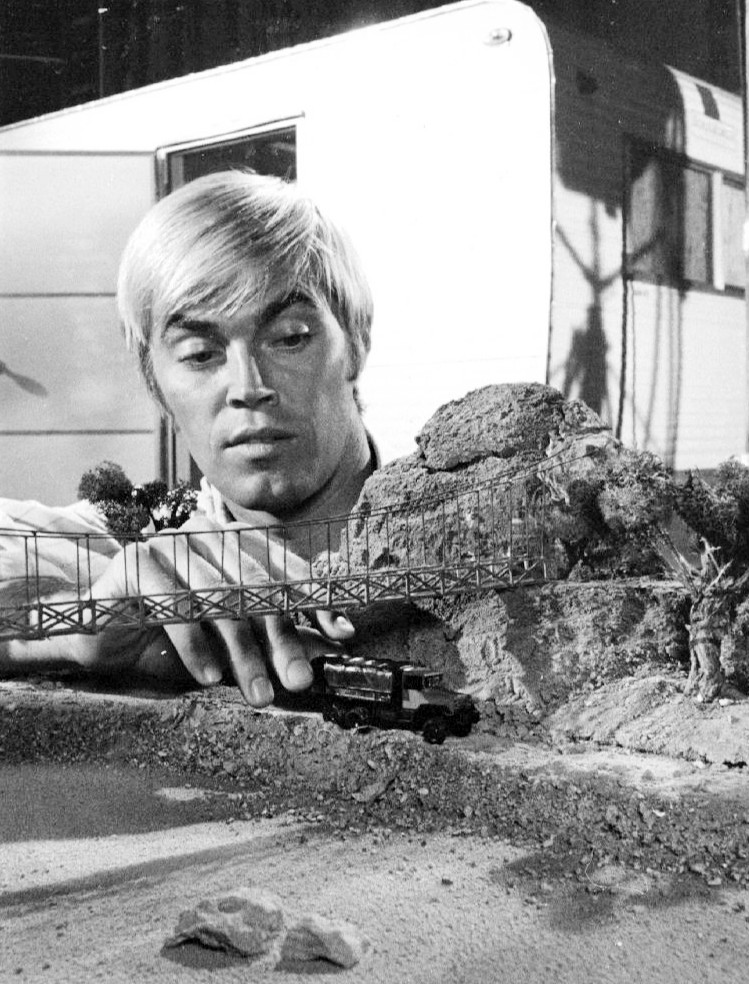
Cole as Davey Evans on Bracken's World, arranging models to film movie stunts

Cole's first wife was Sally Bergeron, and they had a son Joseph (Joe) who was Dennis's only child.

In 1976 Cole guest-starred on Charlie's Angels and met actress Jaclyn Smith. After a 19-month courtship, the couple wed. She was his second wife. Their marriage lasted from 1978 to 1981.

Joe Cole was shot dead in 1991 at age 30 during a home-invasion robbery in the Venice section of Los Angeles. His murder remains unsolved. After the murder of his son, Cole became an activist speaking against violence on television. He worked with the Nicole Brown Charitable Foundation to raise awareness for crime victims, and with the American Cancer Society, Arthritis Foundation, Cystic Fibrosis Foundation and other charitable organizations.

== Later years ==
Dennis was a regular celebrity attendee at the annual Madden Derby Eve party hosted by Anita Madden in Lexington, Kentucky. Dennis was Madden's escort for the event for several years.

Cole performed as the Narrator in a production of Blood Brothers and as King Marchan in the first national tour of the musical Victor/Victoria. While working on a national tour of Victor/Victoria, Cole was injured and spent three years recovering.

Cole relocated to Fort Lauderdale, Florida, in 1999, where he became a real-estate broker and opened his own real-estate company with his third wife Marjorie Cole, whom he married in 2004. The couple owned and operated Celebrity Realty, Inc. The couple divorced in 2008 after claims of domestic violence that eventually resulted in Cole's arrest for obstruction of justice.

m==Death== Cole died of kidney failure at Holy Cross Hospital in Fort Lauderdale, Florida on November 15, 2009. He was 69 years old. Cole is buried at the Forest Lawn, Hollywood Hills Cemetery in Los Angeles.
