= Spooner (band) =

American rock band

- Origin: Madison, Wisconsin, U.S.
- Genres: Power pop; new wave
- Years active: 1974-1985; 1989-1993
- Labels: Mountain Railroad; Boat; Dali/Chameleon
- Spinoffs: Garbage
- Past members: Dave Benton; Doug Erikson; Bob Olsen; Butch Vig; Bill Roberts; Joel Tappero; Jeff Walker

Spooner was an American rock band formed in 1974 in Madison, Wisconsin, by keyboardist/vocalist Doug Erikson, songwriter/guitarist/vocalist Bob Olsen, and guitarist/vocalist Dave Benton originally as an acoustic/electric trio. Between 1975 and 1978, the group had undergone several line-up changes, including adding Butch Vig as a drummer. Extremely popular in Madison and surrounding areas, Spooner released two well-received albums, Every Corner Dance and The Wildest Dreams and toured intensively throughout the Midwest to promote them.

Spooner disbanded in the mid-1980s, with Erikson and Vig moving on to form Fire Town, who recorded two albums before splitting. Spooner subsequently reformed, and released a final album, The Fugitive Dance, before splitting for a final time. During the early nineties, Erikson and Vig's production career took off, with Vig producing for major label artists such as Nirvana and The Smashing Pumpkins before they formed the multi-platinum selling alternative rock group Garbage.

== History ==
After originally meeting at college in Wayne, Nebraska in the early 1970s, and performing under the name "Nickelplate Road", Spooner formed in 1974, after a move to Madison, Wisconsin. Spooner's original incarnation was a three-piece outfit, with Bob Olsen-guitar vocals, Doug Erikson-keyboards, vocals, and Dave Benton-guitar/bass/vocals, and performed a mix of acoustic and electric material without drums: "We did all original stuff, and it was pretty spacey...sort of Jackson Browne-ish". In 1975 Olsen left the band, and they brought in Butch Vig on drums and Bill Roberts on guitar. Vig had performed drums in Eclipse, a Madison garage-pop band. By 1978, Spooner consisted of Erikson, Benton, Vig, keyboardist Jeff Walker and bassist Joel Tappero. The third line-up of Spooner evolved their sound into one considered by their fans to be "new wave," even if the band didn't quite agree with the tag.

The following year, Spooner recorded a four-track extended play, titled Cruel School, with Shoes' Gary Klebe. Founded by Spooner Boat Records to release Cruel School themselves, the E.P. was pressed in a run of 3,000 copies. Boat would eventually release titles from around twenty other local acts. The band's following rocketed afterwards, picking up enough momentum to break into Chicago, and enabling Spooner to make inroads into ten nearby states as well as performing as far away as the Peppermint Lounge in New York City. Spooner supported a number of notable artists, including Cheap Trick, Pat Benatar, Split Enz, The Police and Tom Robinson; a number of major labels, including Elektra and Arista, began to show interest in signing the group.

As soon as they felt that their line-up had solidified, Spooner recorded their first album, Every Corner Dance, with Klebe. Vig spent a lot of time learning the craft of music production with Klebe, who encouraged him to take it further: Vig, alongside his fellow University of Wisconsin graduate, Steve Marker, founded his own eight-track recording studio, Smart Studios, in late 1982. Every Corner Dance was released by Mountain Railroad, a local folk music label. The album picked up good reviews from local media and even received a 3/5 review in Rolling Stone.

By 1984, Spooner were confident enough in their craft that they self-produced their second album, Wildest Dreams, in Smart, as well as releasing it on Boat. Even though a number of copies were exported to the United Kingdom, the band's momentum had begun to wane. Vig was working on the side as a cab driver, while Erikson and Benton were working for delivery firms. Vig formed a second band called First Person with Marker, Phil Davis and Tom LaVarda on bass. Erikson contributed some songwriting to a First Person side-project named Fire Town, which eventually overtook First Person. Fire Town recorded two studio albums, including one for Atlantic, before being wound down by 1989.

Spooner reformed at the end of the eighties, recording a darker third album, The Fugitive Dance. Erikson had been writing songs in a minor key, while the band incorporated some electronic drums into some tracks. Some house remixes of the title track were commissioned but went unreleased. Spooner signed a deal with Dali/Chameleon to release The Fugitive Dance, but after a shake-up at the label, the album was allowed to die a death. Spooner disbanded for the final time in 1993, as Erikson and Vig's production career gained strength.

In 2013 Spooner through bandcamp.com released "Hindsight" a digital only album that is a collection of EPs, singles and unreleased material (such as two songs recorded for the film Dreams Come True) newly remastered. Most tracks are available in digital format for the first time including the last single which was never released.

== Discography ==
Studio albums:

- Every Corner Dance (1982)
- Wildest Dreams (1984)
- The Fugitive Dance (1990)
- Hindsight (2013)

Singles:

- Cruel School (1979)
  (EP) featuring "Dancing Dolls", "Working Girl", "Member of the Family" and "From My Head to My Toes"
- "Where You Gonna Run"/"You're The Lucky One" (1980)
- "Mean Old World"/"Walking with an Angel" (1986)
