= Cows and Beer =

EP by Die Kreuzen
- Released: 1982
- Recorded: September 11, 1982
- Genre: Hardcore punk
- Length: 6:48
- Label: Version Sound

Die Kreuzen chronology
Cows and Beer (1982)	Die Kreuzen (1984)

Professional ratings
Review scores
Source	Rating
Allmusic	2/5 stars

Cows and Beer is an EP by Die Kreuzen, released in 1982 through Version Sound.

== Track listing ==
All tracks are written by Die Kreuzen.

Side one
No.	Title	Length
1.	"Hate Me"	0:46
2.	"Pain"	1:04
3.	"Enemies"	0:56

Side two
No.	Title	Length
1.	"In School"	1:25
2.	"Think for Me"	1:37
3.	"Don't Say Please"	1:00

== Personnel ==
Die Kreuzen

- Keith Brammer – bass guitar
- Brian Egeness – guitar
- Dan Kubinski – vocals
- Erik Tunison – drums

Production and additional personnel

- Richard Kohl – illustrations
