= Cave-In! =

1983 television film by Georg Fenady

- Genre: Action; Disaster
- Written by: Norman Katkov
- Directed by: Georg Fenady
- Starring: Dennis Cole; Susan Sullivan; Leslie Nielsen; James Olson; Ray Milland; Julie Sommars; Sheila Larken; Lonny Chapman
- Music by: Richard LaSalle
- Country of origin: United States
- Original language: English

Production
- Producer: Irwin Allen
- Production location: Burbank Studios
- Cinematography: John Nickolaus
- Editor: Dick Wormell
- Running time: 120 minutes
- Production companies: Irwin Allen Productions; Warner Bros. Television

Original release
- Network: NBC
- Release: June 19, 1983

Cave-In! (sometimes listed as Cave In!) is a 1983 American made-for-television action disaster film starring Dennis Cole, Susan Sullivan, Leslie Nielsen and James Olson. The movie was produced by Irwin Allen in 1979 in association with Warner Bros. Television for NBC but did not air until 1983.

== Plot ==
A park ranger must lead a US senator, a disgraced cop, his wife, a manipulative professor and his daughter across five miles of dangerous terrain to escape an unstable cavern, unaware that the seventh member of the group is an armed and violent escaped convict.

== Cast ==
- Dennis Cole as Gene Pearson
- Susan Sullivan as Senator Kate Lassiter
- Leslie Nielsen as Joe Johnson
- Ray Milland as Professor Harrison Soames
- James Olson as Tom Arlen
- Julie Sommars as Liz Johnson
- Sheila Larken as Ann Soames
- Lonny Chapman as Walt Charles
