= Fire Town =

1980s American rock band

- Origin: Madison, Wisconsin, United States
- Genres: Garage pop, alternative country
- Years active: 1986–1989
- Label: Atlantic Records
- Spinoffs: Garbage
- Members: Doug Erikson; Phil Davis; Tom LaVarda; Butch Vig

Fire Town was an American garage-rock band formed in the mid-1980s in Madison, Wisconsin, United States, from the remnants of an earlier popular local group, Spooner. Fire Town appeared on MTV's "Basement Tapes" show in 1986. Their video, "Carry The Torch", placed second losing to the Columbus, Ohio band Oswald and The Herringbones and their music video "Be By Yourself". Fire Town were signed to a major label and published two albums, In the Heart of the Heart Country and The Good Life. Fire Town separated in 1989 as the members' production commitments grew. Chris Heim of The Chicago Tribune rated The Good Life three stars. The single "The Good Life" reached #18 on the Mainstream Rock Tracks chart in 1989.

Sharing duties on vocals and lead guitar were Doug Erikson and Phil Davis, Tom LaVarda on bass guitar, and Butch Vig on drums. Vig would later go on to become a notable rock producer; Erikson and Vig would later team up with Fire Town's audio engineer Steve Marker to form the multi-platinum selling Garbage in 1994.

Wounded Bird Records re-released both In the Heart of the Heart Country and The Good Life on CD in 2007.

== Discography ==
Studio albums:

- In the Heart of the Heart Country (1987)
- The Good Life (1989)

Singles:

- "Carry the Torch" (1987)
- "Rain On You" (1988)
- "The Good Life" (1989)
- "She Reminds Me of You" (1989)
- "Where the Shadows Fall" (1989)
