= Murder of Joe Cole =

American roadie (1961–1991)

Joe Cole
- Born: Joseph Dennis Cole; April 10, 1961; Los Angeles, California, U.S.
- Died: December 19, 1991 (aged 30); Venice, Los Angeles, California, U.S.
- Occupations: Roadie; writer; author; actor
- Parent(s): Dennis Cole; Sally Bergeron

Joseph Dennis Cole (April 10, 1961 – December 19, 1991) was an American roadie for Black Flag and Rollins Band, who was shot and killed in an armed robbery on December 19, 1991.

== Early life ==
Cole was the son of actor Dennis Cole by his first wife, Sally Bergeron. Cole also worked as a roadie for the band Hole, filming the group's 1991 tour performances, and appeared in several films including Raymond Pettibon's The Book of Manson, where he also has a cinematography credit.

== Death ==
Murder of Joe Cole
- Location: Venice, Los Angeles, California, U.S.
- Date: December 19, 1991
- Attack type: Murder, robbery
- Weapon: Firearm
- Deaths: 1
- No. of participants: 2

Cole and longtime best friend Henry Rollins were assaulted by armed robbers in December 1991 outside their shared Venice Beach, California, home at 809 Brooks Avenue in the Oakwood district. They had attended a Hole concert at the Whisky a Go Go and were returning home after having stopped at an all-night grocery store. Two armed men, described as black and in their 20s, approached them demanding money. Angry that Rollins and Cole had only $50 between them, the gunmen ordered the two men to go inside their house for more cash. Rollins entered at gunpoint. However, Cole was killed outside after being shot in the face at close range while Rollins escaped out the back door and alerted the police. The murder remains unsolved. Cole's death was featured on a segment of the television show Unsolved Mysteries.

Cole was the only son of actor Dennis Cole. After Cole's murder, the elder Cole became an activist against violence on television.

In a 1992 interview with The Los Angeles Times, Rollins revealed he kept a plastic container full of soil soaked with Cole's blood. Rollins said, "I dug up all the earth where his head fell – he was shot in the face – and I've got all the dirt here, and so Joe Cole's in the house. I say good morning to him every day. I got his phone, too, so I got a direct line to him. So that feels good."

Cole was known in the early 1990s American alternate rock scene due to his work as a roadie during tours with Black Flag and Rollins Band. Cole is remembered in the Sonic Youth songs "JC" and "100%" on their album Dirty, and appears in the music video for their song "My Friend Goo". Other dedications to his memory include the Rollins Band song "Volume 4" on their album Weight (1994), the Sonic Youth documentary 1991: The Year Punk Broke (1992), and the Hole album Live Through This (1994).

A book of Cole's collected writings, primarily tour journals, was published posthumously by Rollins's publishing company and titled Planet Joe. It describes his time touring in the 1980s, in particular with Black Flag. Rollins included Cole's story in his spoken word performances. Cole also appeared in Raves – God's Movie, Volume 1 starring Joe Cole. According to Rolling Stone, after Cole's death, hundreds of hours of interviews Cole had taped with "flamboyant street characters" in Venice Beach were edited into an hour of "primo footage" that the magazine described as "an unflinching look at the American dream gone amok".

In a 2001 interview with Howard Stern, Rollins was asked about rumors that he kept Cole's brain in his house. He stated that he has only the soil from the spot where Cole was killed. During the interview, he also speculated that the reason they were targeted may have been because, days prior to the incident, record producer Rick Rubin had requested to hear the newly-recorded album The End of Silence (1992) and parked his Rolls-Royce car outside their house while carrying a cell phone. Due to some recent crime in the neighborhood, Rollins suspected Rubin’s visit would bring trouble because of suspicions there was money in the home. He even wrote in his journal the night of Rubin's visit that his home "is going to get popped".

== See also ==
- List of unsolved murders (1980–1999)
