= God Hears Pleas of the Innocent =

Studio album by Killdozer
- Released: February 13, 1995
- Recorded: September 1994
- Studios: The House That Dripped Blood, Chicago, Illinois
- Genre: Sludge metal
- Length: 36:06
- Label: Touch and Go
- Producer: Steve Albini

Killdozer chronology
Uncompromising War on Art Under the Dictatorship of the Proletariat (1994)	God Hears Pleas of the Innocent (1995)	The Last Waltz (1997)

God Hears Pleas of the Innocent is the sixth album by Killdozer, released in 1995. It was the band's final album. "Pour Man" is a cover of the Lee Hazlewood song.

== Critical reception ==
Professional ratings
Review scores
Source	Rating
AllMusic	2.5/5 stars
Chicago Tribune	3/4 stars
Rock Hard	7.0/10

The Washington Post wrote that "such tunes as 'The Buzzard' and 'Big Song of Hell' suggest an alternate universe where Black Sabbath taught Robert Johnson how to play the blues, rather than the other way around." The Wisconsin State Journal deemed the album "another outrageously heavy slab of sludge-grunge."

The Chicago Tribune determined that Killdozer is "still uproariously brutish, raucous, heavy and slow, and it still thankfully sounds like it records down a dirt road in the company of several dozen mysteriously buried corpses." The Philadelphia Inquirer called God Hears Pleas of the Innocent "an offering of thick, sludgy rock and roll for the working man (and woman), and a rare mix of social consciousness with a sense of humor."

== Track listing ==
All tracks are written by Killdozer, except "Pour Man" by Lee Hazlewood.

No.	Title	Length
1.	"A Mother Has a Hard Road"	2:55
2.	"Porky's Dad"	4:15
3.	"Pour Man"	3:27
4.	"The Buzzard"	2:58
5.	"Paul Doesn't Understand Jazz"	1:30
6.	"Daddy's Boy"	2:52
7.	"The Nobbies (A Sea Chanty)"	3:42
8.	"Big Song of Hell"	3:42
9.	"Cannonball Runn II '95"	2:03
10.	"I Have Seen Grown Men Cry"	5:28
11.	"Spork"	2:54

== Personnel ==
Killdozer

- Michael Gerald – vocals, bass guitar
- Dan Hobson – drums
- Paul Zagoras – guitar

Production and additional personnel

- Steve Albini – production, engineering, mixing
- Killdozer – production, mixing
