= Die Kreuzen (album) =

Studio album by Die Kreuzen
- Released: 1984
- Recorded: April 2, 1984–April 7, 1984 at Multi-Track Studios, Detroit
- Genre: Hardcore punk, crossover thrash
- Length: 29:27
- Label: Touch and Go
- Producer: Corey Rusk

Die Kreuzen chronology
Cows and Beer (1982)	Die Kreuzen (1984)	October File (1986)

Professional ratings
Review scores
Source	Rating
Allmusic	3/5 stars

Die Kreuzen is the debut album of Die Kreuzen, released in 1984 through Touch and Go Records. This is Die Kreuzen's last hardcore punk album before they moved on to other styles of music such as alternative rock.

== Track listing ==
All tracks are written by Die Kreuzen.

Side one
No.	Title	Length
1.	"Rumors"	1:48
2.	"This Hope"	1:10
3.	"In School"	1:23
4.	"I'm Tired"	0:52
5.	"On the Street"	1:34
6.	"Enemies"	0:56
7.	"Get 'em"	0:57
8.	"Fighting"	0:36
9.	"No Time"	1:16
10.	"All White"	3:38

Side two
No.	Title	Length
1.	"Pain"	1:16
2.	"Sick People"	2:04
3.	"Hate Me"	0:46
4.	"Live Wire"	1:46
5.	"Not Anymore"	0:55
6.	"Mannequin"	1:11
7.	"Fuckups"	1:10
8.	"Think for Me"	1:39
9.	"Dirt and Decay"	1:11
10.	"Don't Say Please"	1:01
11.	"No Name"	1:28

== Personnel ==
Die Kreuzen

- Keith Brammer – bass guitar
- Brian Egeness – guitar
- Dan Kubinski – vocals
- Erik Tunison – drums

Production and additional personnel

- Rick Canzano – engineering
- Richard Kohl – illustrations
- Corey Rusk – production
