= Century Days =

Studio album by Die Kreuzen
- Released: July 1988
- Recorded: December 3, 1987–January 26, 1988
- Studio: Breezeway, Waukesha, Wisconsin
- Length: 56:35
- Label: Touch and Go
- Producer: Die Kreuzen, Butch Vig

Die Kreuzen chronology
October File (1986)	Century Days (1988)	Gone Away (1989)

Century Days is the third album by Die Kreuzen, released in July 1988 through Touch and Go Records. The album was produced in part by Butch Vig. It sold around 10,000 copies in its first three years of release.

== Critical reception ==
Professional ratings
Review scores
Source	Rating
AllMusic	4/5 stars

The Washington Post wrote: "Unlike [bands] who are trying to integrate melody into hardcore without undermining its power, Die Kreuzen ... owes more to early-'70s metal." Trouser Press deemed Century Days "an album of impressive dynamic range and sonic control."

== Track listing ==
All tracks are written by Die Kreuzen.

No.	Title	Edition	Length
1.	"Earthquakes"		3:19
2.	"Lean into It"		5:11
3.	"Different Ways"		3:28
4.	"So Many Times"		4:33
5.	"These Days"		5:30
6.	"Elizabeth"		5:28
7.	"Stomp"		2:14
8.	"Slow"		3:09
9.	"The Bone"		4:09
10.	"Bitch Magnet"		3:03
11.	"Number Three"		6:22
12.	"Dream Sky"	cassette and CD editions	6:25
13.	"Halloween (John Carpenter)"	CD edition	3:44

== Personnel ==
Die Kreuzen

- Keith Brammer – bass guitar
- Brian Egeness – guitar, piano
- Dan Kubinski – vocals
- Erik Tunison – drums

Production and additional personnel

- Peter Balistrieri – alto saxophone, baritone saxophone
- Tim Cole – trumpet
- Richard Kohl – cover art
- Die Kreuzen – production, mixing
- Butch Vig – production, engineering, mixing
- Gene Emery Zanow – cover art
