= Twelve Point Buck =

Studio album by Killdozer
- Released: 1989
- Recorded: 1987–1989
- Studios: Smart, Madison, Wisconsin
- Genres: Noise rock, post-hardcore
- Length: 37:13
- Label: Touch and Go
- Producers: Steve Marker, Butch Vig

Killdozer chronology
Little Baby Buntin' (1987)	Twelve Point Buck (1989)	For Ladies Only (1989)

Twelve Point Buck is the fourth album by Killdozer, released in 1989 through Touch and Go Records.

Twelve Point Buck was reissued in 2013.

== Reception and impact ==
Professional ratings
Review scores
Source	Rating
AllMusic	2.5/5 stars

The Washington Post wrote that the "thump-and-grind is art music" and that "there's an integrity to its unrelentingly harsh rumble." The Wisconsin State Journal deemed the album "industrial dirge music at its best."

After hearing the album, Sub Pop's Jonathan Poneman suggested that Nirvana record demos with Killdozer producer Butch Vig; after signing with DGC Records, Kurt Cobain asked Vig to produce Nevermind. Cobain told Vig that he wanted Nevermind to sound "as heavy" as Twelve Point Buck.

== Track listing ==
All tracks are written by Killdozer.

Side one
No.	Title	Length
1.	"New Pants and Shirt"	3:36
2.	"Space: 1999"	2:56
3.	"Lupus"	3:09
4.	"Richard"	4:17
5.	"Man Vs. Nature"	3:15

Side two
No.	Title	Length
1.	"Gates of Heaven"	4:38
2.	"Pig Foot and Beer"	2:54
3.	"Seven Thunders"	3:45
4.	"Free Love in Amsterdam"	4:42
5.	"Ted Key Beefs"	4:01

== Personnel ==
Killdozer

- Michael Gerald – vocals, bass guitar, baritone horn
- Bill Hobson – guitar
- Dan Hobson – drums

Production and additional personnel

- Frank l Anderson – accordion on "Free Love in Amsterdam"
- Bill Crawford – trumpet on "Lupus"
- Eric Olson – trumpet on "Lupus"
- Steve Marker – production, engineering
- Butch Vig – production

== Charts ==
Chart (1989)	Peak position
UK Indie Chart	16
