= Intellectuals Are the Shoeshine Boys of the Ruling Elite =

Intellectuals are the Shoeshine Boys of the Ruling Elite

Studio album by Killdozer
- Released: 1984
- Recorded: November 1983
- Studio: Smart, Madison, Wisconsin
- Genre: Noise rock, post-hardcore
- Length: 21:32
- Label: Bone Air (original release); Touch & Go (reissue)
- Producer: Steve Marker, Butch Vig

Killdozer chronology
Intellectuals are the Shoeshine Boys of the Ruling Elite (1984)	Snake Boy (1985)

Intellectuals Are the Shoeshine Boys of the Ruling Elite is the debut album by Killdozer. It was originally released in 1984 through Bone Air Records, and reissued in 1989 by Touch & Go Records.

== Critical reception ==
Professional ratings
Review scores
Source	Rating
AllMusic	3/5 stars
The Encyclopedia of Popular Music	3/5 stars

Maximumrocknroll wrote that "jazzy-metal instrumentation, extremely gruff vocals, and smart-ass lyrics are the hallmarks of this debut."

== Track listing ==
All tracks are written by Killdozer, except "Run Through the Jungle" by John Fogerty, frontman of Creedence Clearwater Revival.

Side one
No.	Title	Length
1.	"Man of Meat"	2:13
2.	"Pile Driver"	3:52
3.	"Parade"	2:15
4.	"Farmer Johnson"	4:32

Side two
No.	Title	Length
1.	"Ed Gein"	2:08
2.	"A Man's Gotta Be a Man"	1:43
3.	"Dead Folks"	2:50
4.	"Run Through the Jungle"	3:19

== Personnel ==
Killdozer

- Michael Gerald – vocals, bass guitar
- Bill Hobson – guitar
- Dan Hobson – drums

Production and additional personnel

- Steve Marker – production
- Mike Tincher – design
- Butch Vig – production
- Bob Wasserman – photography
