= Die Kreuzen =

American rock band

- Origin: Rockford, Illinois, U.S.
- Genres: Hardcore punk; post-punk; alternative rock
- Years active: 1981–1992, 2012–present
- Labels: Touch and Go
- Members: Dan Kubinski; Brian Egeness; Jay Tiller; Keith Brammer; Erik Tunison
- Website: Touch&Go: Die Kreuzen

Die Kreuzen (/diː ˈkrɔɪtsən/ dee KROYT-sən) is an American rock band from Rockford, Illinois formed in 1981. Shortly after, they relocated to Milwaukee, Wisconsin. The name, which was taken from a German Bible, is grammatically incorrect German for "the crosses". They began as a hardcore punk group and evolved musically to alternative rock.

== History ==
=== Early years ===
Die Kreuzen was originally called "The Stellas". It consisted of Dan Kubinski on vocals, Brian Egeness on guitar, Keith Brammer on bass guitar, and Erik Tunison on drums.

After contributing tracks to the Charred Remains and The Master Tape compilations, the band's debut release was the Cows and Beer EP. Their 21-song eponymous debut album was released in 1984, and included new versions of the tracks from Cows and Beer. The 1986 follow-up, October File, saw the band move away from hardcore into slower, more conceptual work. Their third album, Century Days (1988), saw the band incorporate piano and a horn section.

=== Later years, side projects, and breakup ===
In 1989 Brammer joined the band Wreck. Other members worked on side projects, including Kubinski and Egeness's Cheap Trick tribute band Chick Treat. On April 1, 1992, Egeness left the band. Shortly thereafter, the rest of the band members formed the band Chainfall, along with guitarist Charles Jordan (of S.O.D.A and Nerve Twins). Kubinski and Tunison later played in Fuckface, while Brammer played with the Carnival Strippers. Brammer, Tunison, and Kubinski were involved with the seminal, U.S. industrial ensemble, Boy Dirt Car. Tunison played on Killdozer's farewell tour (ca. 1996), was the drummer in the early 2000s for Milwaukee's D Minus. He appears on the 2012 Steve Aoki track "The Kids Will Have Their Say".

Kubinski went on to form a new band, Custom Grand. Kubinski also had the band; Decapitado, Decapitado broke up back in the late 2000s after releasing the full length CD entitled "Blacked", one 7 inch single entitled "Autowriter" and one CD single entitled "Muzzle". Kubinski is currently singing in "The Crosses" which writes and performs its own music as well as performing Die Kreuzens self titled LP in its entirety as well as most of the Die Kreuzen LP, "October File". The Crosses members include; Jim Potter on guitar (Dr Shrinker, Viogression, FECK and Test-Site), Jesse Sieren on drums (Big Laugh, So Zuppy, Evinspragg and Obsess Tact) and Joe Sanfelippo on bass guitar (Astrokadaaver and Population Control). The Crosses released a CD single entitled "Hate Market" in 2024 along with a video single for the "Hate Market" song and the "Live at the Powerhouse" video. The Crosses continue to play live gigs across the midwest, East and West Coasts and are currently recording a brand new four song EP scheduled for release in late 2025. Kubinski also has a solo effort entitled "DeadFinger" where he plays acoustic guitar and sings. DeadFinger released a full length LP of nine classic rock and classic punk songs and one original song entitled "Ghosts" along with a video for "Ghosts" in 2022. DeadFinger is currently working on the follow up LP entitled "Black Heart" which is scheduled for release in 2026 and is made up of nine original songs and one cover song. Egeness has composed scores for the movies The Astonished Man (2008), Wake Before I Die (2011), and The Weather Outside (2011).

The majority of Die Kreuzen records were produced by future Nirvana and Smashing Pumpkins producer, Butch Vig. All of their records, with the exception of their first 7" on Version Sound, were released by the Chicago record label, Touch & Go Records.

=== Tributes and reunion ===
In 1986, Robert Palmer of The New York Times described Die Kreuzen as "one of the new bands recasting the legacy of 70's Gothic-metal (Black Sabbath, etc.) for this modern age".

In 2005, a tribute to Die Kreuzen was released, Lean Into It – A Tribute to Die Kreuzen, featuring covers of Die Kreuzen songs by Napalm Death, Mike Watt, Voivod, Season to Risk, and Vic Bondi, among others. The album features liner notes by Thurston Moore, who states, "Man, there was a point there when Die Kreuzen were the best band in the USA".

In 2011, Die Kreuzen were inducted into the Wisconsin Area Music Industry (WAMI) Hall of Fame. In their acceptance speech, they named a handful of current artists that they thought deserved consideration: IfIHadAHiFi, Northless, the Zebras, and Zola Jesus.

Die Kreuzen resumed playing shows, performing a sold-out concert on May 26, 2012, at Turner Hall in Milwaukee. Thereafter they played the 2013 Roadburn Festival in Tilburg, Holland and the Afterburner show the following day. After their return to the states, Die Kreuzen played a secret show at a small Milwaukee club as a warm up to their May 25 concert at The Double Door in Chicago and their much anticipated return to Turner Hall on May 26, 2012. Die Kreuzen played at Phatheadz II in Green Bay, Wisconsin, on July 20, 2013, with Rev. Nørb & The Onions opening. Additional shows were scheduled in Madison, Wisconsin, and Minneapolis, Minnesota, later that summer with Negative Approach, Mudhoney, and The Melvins. The band also performed at McAuliffe's Pub in Racine, Wisconsin, on July 17, 2013.

A book by music journalist Sahan Jayasuriya entitled Don't Say Please: The Oral History of Die Kreuzen was released in August 2025 by Feral House. The book includes interview transcripts with band members and commentary from artists such as Thurston Moore, Steve Albini, Neko Case, Butch Vig, and Lou Barlow. It has received positive attention, with appearances by the author and band members at independent bookstores and record shops, and on podcasts including Veil of Sound (August 2, 2025) and Booked on Rock (Episode 314, August 25, 2025).

== Musical style ==
The band were initially a hardcore punk band but took in elements of heavy metal, gothic rock, shoegaze and alternative rock. They have been described as "anticipating the grunge rock sound of the '90s" and were credited with bringing intelligence and lyrical diversity to the heavy metal genre.

== Discography ==
=== Albums ===
- Die Kreuzen (1984)
- October File (1986, CD included first album)
- Century Days (1988)
- Cement (1991)
- Internal (1993) (promo-only)

=== EPs ===
- Cows and Beer (1982)
- Gone Away (1989)

=== 7" singles ===
- "Gone Away"/"Different ways" (live) (1989)
- "Pink Flag"/"Land of Treason" (1990)
- "Big Bad Days"/"Gone Away" (acoustic) (1991)

=== Demo releases ===
- Demo Tape (1982)

=== Compilation appearances ===
- Charred Remains compilation tape (1981, Version Sound): "Pain", "Hate Me"
- The Master Tape LP (1982, Affirmation): "On the Street", "All White", "Fighting"
- America's Dairyland tape (1983, Last Rites): "Think For Me", "Enemies", "Rumors"
- Code Blue tape (1984, Last Rites): "Fuck Up", "Live Wire", "Champs"
- Sugar Daddy Live Split Series Vol. 5 split 12" with the Melvins, Negative Approach and Necros (2012, Amphetamine Reptile Records): "In School"

== See also ==
- Wreck (band)
