= Dirty (Sonic Youth album) =

1992 studio album by Sonic Youth

- Standard edition cover

Studio album by Sonic Youth
- Released: July 21, 1992
- Recorded: 1992
- Studios: Magic Shop, New York City; Sear Sound, New York City
- Genre: Experimental rock
- Length: 59:06
- Label: DGC
- Producers: Butch Vig; Sonic Youth

Sonic Youth chronology
| Goo (1990) | Dirty (1992) | TV Shit (1993) |

Sonic Youth studio album chronology
| Goo (1990) | Dirty (1992) | Experimental Jet Set, Trash and No Star (1994) |

Singles from Dirty
- 1. "100%" Released: June 29, 1992; 2. "Youth Against Fascism" Released: October 26, 1992; 3. "Sugar Kane" Released: March 22, 1993; 4. "Drunken Butterfly" Released: August 1993

Dirty (printed and stylized as diRty) is the seventh full-length studio album and second double album by the American rock band Sonic Youth, released on July 21, 1992, by DGC Records. The band recorded and co-produced the album with Butch Vig in early 1992 at the Magic Shop recording studios.

Coming off of the success of Goo, the band recorded the album as Alternative Rock began to surge in popularity, and released Dirty after major breakthroughs for the genre such as Nevermind by Nirvana and Blood Sugar Sex Magik by Red Hot Chili Peppers. As such, the sound on Dirty was inspired by the popularity of grunge music at the time, and has been described by Billboard magazine as experimental rock.

Dirty reached number 83 on the US Billboard 200 and number six on the UK Albums Chart. The album spawned four singles: the lead single "100%" charted well, but was not the crossover hit the label anticipated, followed by "Youth Against Fascism", which did not chart as well. The last two were "Sugar Kane" and "Drunken Butterfly", with the former performing better commercially than the latter. In support of the album, Sonic Youth embarked on the "Pretty Fucking Dirty" tour of 1992 and 1993, where they played most of the album during sets. In late 1992, they toured North America, and in early 1993, they toured New Zealand and Australia and released the Whores Moaning EP, which featured most of the "Sugar Kane" B-sides.

== Background ==
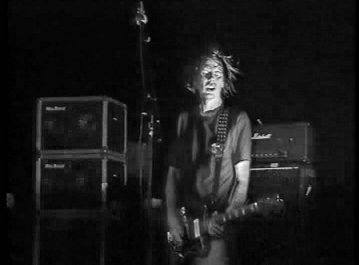
Thurston Moore onstage with Sonic Youth in the Netherlands, September 1, 1991

Following the release of Daydream Nation in 1988, Sonic Youth were interested in signing with a major record label. By the middle of 1989, the top contenders for the band's new label were A&M Records, Atlantic Records and Mute Records. Between late 1989 and early 1990, Geffen Records announced its interest in signing the band. Sonic Youth eventually signed a five-album deal with Geffen for an estimated $300,000. However, the band was disappointed when they discovered that the albums would be released on the newly created Geffen sub-label, DGC Records.

In 1990, the band released Goo, which achieved moderate commercial success, peaking at No. 96 on the Billboard 200 in the United States and charting in the Netherlands, New Zealand and the United Kingdom. Critical reception to the album was positive. To support its release, Sonic Youth toured Europe and North America twice in 1990. Preceding the mainstream breakthrough of alternative rock and grunge, the band toured Europe again in late summer 1991 with Nirvana, Dinosaur Jr, Babes in Toyland and Gumball. On this tour, they premiered "Orange Rolls, Angel's Spit" and "Chapel Hill", both of which would later appear on Dirty. The latter tour was chronicled in the documentary 1991: The Year Punk Broke, directed by Dave Markey. In November, the group began recording demos at their rehearsal space in Hoboken, New Jersey.

== Recording ==
For Dirty, Sonic Youth worked with producer Butch Vig and mixer Andy Wallace, who both had worked in the same roles on Nirvana's Nevermind, although this was not why the band chose them. On the album's sound, Pitchfork would later opine that "they weren't entirely catering to the new ears Nirvana's success was sending their way", but "were at least taking it into consideration on a semi-conscious level". During his first meeting with the group, Vig told the band that he wanted to tighten the song arrangements and focus on crafting the guitar sounds. Vig quickly landed the producer job for the record. During a visit to the apartment of Sonic Youth members Thurston Moore and Kim Gordon, Moore told Vig that he wanted the album to sound like a Mecht Mensch single that Vig had produced.

The band sent a series of cassette tapes to Vig in late 1991, featuring their new compositions. Vig was pleased with the material but also uncertain about how to handle it, as the tapes consisted of long instrumentals with unclear song structures. The second batch of cassettes that Vig received demonstrated that the band had performed some self-editing with its compositions. Vig moved to New York City for three months in early 1992 and the band began recording the album at the Magic Shop in March. Ian MacKaye of Fugazi contributed guest guitar on "Youth Against Fascism". The last song on the album, "Crème Brûlée", was recorded by guitarist Lee Ranaldo while Gordon was playing guitar and singing, drummer Steve Shelley was playing the drums, and Moore was trying to turn on his amplifier.

After recording was completed, the album needed to be trimmed down from eighteen completed tracks. Moore, Gordon and the band's A&R representative, Gary Gersh, agreed that Ranaldo's song "Genetic" would be removed. Ranaldo did not react well to the decision; coupled with personal issues he was facing at the time, it led him to consider leaving the group. "Genetic" and Gordon's "Hendrix Necro" were instead featured on the "100%" single. Another track recorded during the sessions, "Stalker", was added to the album's vinyl release.

== Lyrics and themes ==
The songs "100%" and "JC" were written about the murder of Joe Cole, a close friend of the group, and how it affected the band. The next song, "Swimsuit Issue", is about a then-current Geffen employee who was remanded to therapy for sexual harassment, hence the lyrics "Don't touch my breast, I'm just working at my desk." The last section of the song features Gordon naming all of the models in the March 1992 Sports Illustrated Swimsuit Issue.

The lyrics to "Drunken Butterfly" were taken wholly from song titles and lyrics from material written by Heart, and the track was originally titled "Barracuda" after a Heart song. The final title was taken from Heart song "Dog & Butterfly", which sounds a bit like "drunken butterfly". "Sugar Kane" is said to be about Marilyn Monroe, and is named after her character in Some Like It Hot.

"Chapel Hill," one of the first songs written for the album, is about the unsolved 1991 murder of Bob Sheldon, owner of Internationalist Books in Carrboro, North Carolina.

== Packaging ==
The front cover of the album, a photograph taken by Gordon's longtime friend Mike Kelley, depicted an orange stuffed toy with Sonic Youth written down the sides. The theme continued through the CD booklet with pictures of a teddy bear, rabbit and other plush animals. The credits were also included in the booklet. The back cover featured images of individual members of the band along with the track listing. The vinyl version differed, with the back cover featuring the stuffed toys and the band photos in the inserts. Some versions of the CD have a "dirty picture" of Bob Flanagan and Sheree Rose defiling stuffed toys while naked.

== Release ==
Prior to the album's release, Sonic Youth undertook a short Northeast tour in which most of Dirty was premiered. Dirty was released on July 21, 1992, on double LP vinyl, CD and Cassette. The LP version of the album came with an extra track titled "Stalker". The album hit No. 6 in the UK Albums Chart (their highest charting album in the UK) and No. 83 in the US. In the wake of the success of Nirvana's 1991 album Nevermind, DGC pushed Dirty heavily. In the same month as the album was issued, "100%" was released as a single, but was not the crossover hit the label anticipated. Geffen executive Mark Kates admitted it "was not a great radio song"; however, the song was popular on alternative and college radio, reaching No. 4 in the Billboard Alternative Songs and No. 28 in the UK Singles Chart. In September, the band appeared on Late Night with David Letterman, performing "100%". At the urging of Kates, "Youth Against Fascism" was released in December as the album's second single. The single did not sell well or receive airplay (though it did chart at No. 52 in the UK), and Kates referred to the decision as "one of the biggest professional mistakes of my life".

In late 1992, the band began their "Pretty Fucking Dirty" tour, starting in North America. All of the songs from Dirty were played at least once, except for "Crème Brûlée". They also played "Genetic," but occasionally swapped it for "Eric's Trip" or "Mote". They changed the setlists frequently, but kept "Shoot" as the opener. In November and December, they toured Europe, also appearing on Later with Jools Holland to perform "Drunken Butterfly", "Sugar Kane" and "JC". In January and February 1993, Sonic Youth toured Australia and New Zealand, and released the "Sugar Kane" single, which performed much better than "Youth Against Fascism", reaching No. 26 in the UK Singles Chart. The same month, they released the Whores Moaning Australia-only EP to coincide with the tour. The EP included the "Sugar Kane" B-sides along with the track "Tamra". The last single from the album, "Drunken Butterfly", was released in August 1993 in Germany only.

== Critical reception ==
Professional ratings
Review scores
| Source | Rating |
|---|---|
| AllMusic | 4/5 stars |
| Blender | 4/5 stars |
| Chicago Tribune | 4/4 stars |
| Entertainment Weekly | A |
| Los Angeles Times | 4/4 stars |
| NME | 9/10 |
| Pitchfork | 8.6/10 |
| Rolling Stone | 4/5 stars |
| Uncut | 5/5 stars |
| The Village Voice | A |

Dirty was generally well-received by critics. Entertainment Weekly praised the album, calling it "possibly the finest hour (59 minutes, actually) from this New York noise & roll band. It is also much-needed proof that the old-fangled concept of a rock guitar band can still result in vital, undeniably moving music", and ending the review with, "At this point, every other rock & roll album that visits our planet this year will have a hard time topping [Dirty]". Rolling Stone opined that Dirty "easily rank[s] with Daydream Nation and Sister" as "the band's most unified and unforgettable recorded works".

Trouser Press saw Dirty as a big improvement over Goo, which it felt had "fail[ed] miserably". AllMusic would later call it "a damn good rock album, and on those terms it ranks with Sonic Youth's best work".

=== Accolades ===
Dirty was deemed the best album of 1992 by Entertainment Weekly. The album was also included in the book 1001 Albums You Must Hear Before You Die.

== Music videos ==
The first music video from Dirty was for "100%". It was directed by Tamra Davis and Spike Jonze, and shot in Los Angeles. Much of the video footage was shot by Jonze while riding on a skateboard, following others in the streets (including then-skateboarder, now-actor Jason Lee). The video also alluded to the shooting death of Cole, but is not specifically about him, and more about friendship between two skateboarders. Sonic Youth is shown playing a house party throughout the film. In the video, Gordon plays a yellow Fender bass guitar which she had borrowed from actor Keanu Reeves.

The second music video, for "Youth Against Fascism", was directed by Nick Egan. The video was shot in the concrete flood control channel of the Los Angeles River with the band playing while FMX bikers ride around. Imagery of fascism, Nazism and communism was spliced into the video, plus an insurrection mixed with pictures of punk bands and fashion.

The third music video was for "Sugar Kane"; like "Youth Against Fascism", it was directed by Egan. The video was shot in New York City and portrayed Sonic Youth performing in the midst of a fashion show that showcased "grunge" clothing. The clothing, in fact, was one of the collections ("Grunge Collection") done by Marc Jacobs for Perry Ellis in 1992. Jacobs was a close friend of Gordon and the band. The video also marked the first film appearance of Chloë Sevigny.

The fourth video from Dirty was for "Drunken Butterfly", directed by Stephen Hellweg, the winner of an MTV 120 Minutes contest in which fans were asked to send in videos for any song on Dirty. It featured puppets and dolls made up to look like Sonic Youth performing the song onstage. The fifth (for "Swimsuit Issue", which featured shirtless men smoking together in a room listening to Dirty) and sixth (for "Nic Fit", showing someone running around in a field holding up a flaming stuffed animal) videos stemmed from the same contest.

== Track listing ==
All tracks are written by Sonic Youth, except as noted.

| No. | Title | Writer(s) | Vocals | Length |
|---|---|---|---|---|
| 1. | "100%" | | Moore | 2:28 |
| 2. | "Swimsuit Issue" | | Gordon | 2:57 |
| 3. | "Theresa's Sound-World" | | Moore | 5:27 |
| 4. | "Drunken Butterfly" | | Gordon | 3:03 |
| 5. | "Shoot" | | Gordon | 5:16 |
| 6. | "Wish Fulfillment" | | Ranaldo | 3:24 |
| 7. | "Sugar Kane" | | Moore | 5:56 |
| 8. | "Orange Rolls, Angel's Spit" | | Gordon | 4:17 |
| 9. | "Youth Against Fascism" | | Moore | 3:36 |
| 10. | "Nic Fit" (Untouchables cover) | Alec MacKaye | Moore | 0:59 |
| 11. | "On the Strip" | | Gordon | 5:41 |
| 12. | "Chapel Hill" | | Moore | 4:46 |
| 13. | "JC" | | Gordon | 4:01 |
| 14. | "Purr" | | Moore | 4:21 |
| 15. | "Crème Brûlée" | | Gordon | 2:33 |

Vinyl and Japan CD bonus track
| No. | Title | Lyrics/vocals | Length |
|---|---|---|---|
| 16. | "Stalker" | Moore | 3:01 |

Deluxe Edition bonus tracks
| No. | Title | Lyrics/vocals | Length |
|---|---|---|---|
| 16. | "Stalker" | Moore | 3:01 |
| 17. | "Genetic" | Ranaldo | 3:35 |
| 18. | "Hendrix Necro" | Gordon | 2:49 |
| 19. | "The Destroyed Room" | Gordon | 3:21 |

Deluxe Edition bonus disc
| No. | Title | Writer(s) | Vocals | Length |
|---|---|---|---|---|
| 1. | "Is It My Body" (Alice Cooper cover) | Cooper, Dennis Dunaway, Neal Smith, Glen Buxton | Gordon | 2:52 |
| 2. | "Personality Crisis" (New York Dolls cover) | David Johansen, Johnny Thunders | Gordon | 3:41 |
| 3. | "The End of the End of the Ugly" | | | 4:19 |
| 4. | "Tamra" | | | 8:34 |
| 5. | "Little Jammy Thing" | | | 2:20 |
| 6. | "Lite Damage" | | | 5:22 |
| 7. | "Dreamfinger" | | | 7:41 |
| 8. | "Barracuda" | | | 4:22 |
| 9. | "New White Kross" | | | 1:29 |
| 10. | "Guido" | | | 3:50 |
| 11. | "Stalker" | | | 3:37 |
| 12. | "Moonface" | | | 4:44 |
| 13. | "Poet in the Pit" | | | 2:41 |
| 14. | "Theoretical Chaos" | | | 3:07 |
| 15. | "Youth Against Fascism" | | | 5:03 |
| 16. | "Wish Fulfillment" | | Ranaldo | 3:50 |

== Personnel ==
Sonic Youth

- Thurston Moore – vocals, guitar, production, mixing (track 10)
- Kim Gordon – bass, vocals, guitar, production, mixing (track 10)
- Lee Ranaldo – guitar, vocals, production, mixing (track 10)
- Steve Shelley – drums, production, mixing (track 10)

Additional personnel

- Ian MacKaye – guitar (track 9)

Technical

- Butch Vig – production, engineering, mixing (track 15)
- Andy Wallace – mixing (all tracks except 10 and 15)
- Edward Douglas – engineering
- Fred Kevorkian – engineering assistance
- John Siket – mixing assistance
- Peter Beckerman – mixing assistance
- Howie Weinberg – mastering
- Mike Kelley – sleeve artwork
- Kevin Reagan – sleeve art direction
- Richard Kern – sleeve photography

== Chart positions ==
=== Album ===
| Chart (1992) | Peak Position |
|---|---|
| Australian ARIA Albums Chart | 22 |
| Austrian Albums Chart | 37 |
| Canada Top Albums/CDs (RPM) | 36 |
| German Media Control Charts | 59 |
| New Zealand Albums Chart | 5 |
| Swedish Sverigetopplistan | 26 |
| Dutch Albums (Album Top 100) | 90 |
| UK Albums Chart | 6 |
| U. S. Billboard 200 | 83 |

| Chart (2025) | Peak position |
|---|---|
| Greek Albums (IFPI) | 33 |

=== Singles ===
| Year | Single | Peak chart positions | |
| Year | Single | US Mod. | UK singles |
|---|---|---|---|
| 1992 | "100%" | 4 | 28 |
| 1992 | "Youth Against Fascism" | — | 52 |
| 1993 | "Sugar Kane" | — | 26 |
| 1993 | "Drunken Butterfly" | — | — |

== Release history ==
| Region | Date | Distributing Label | Format |
|---|---|---|---|
| US, UK, Canada | 21 July 1992 | DGC Records | 12-inch vinyl, CD, Cassette |
| Europe, Japan, Australia | 1992 | Geffen, DGC | 12-inch vinyl, CD |
| Australia | 1995 | Geffen | CD (includes the "Burning Spear" 7-inch) |
| US, UK | 2003 | Geffen | 4×12-inch vinyl, 2×CD |
