= October File (album) =

Studio album by Die Kreuzen
- Released: May 1986
- Recorded: October 1985 at Multi-Track Studios, Detroit
- Genre: Post-hardcore
- Length: 37:48
- Label: Touch and Go
- Producer: Die Kreuzen, Corey Rusk

Die Kreuzen chronology
Die Kreuzen (1984)	October File (1986)	Century Days (1988)

Professional ratings
Review scores
Source	Rating
Allmusic	4.5/5 stars

October File is the second album by Die Kreuzen, released in May 1986 through Touch and Go Records.

== Track listing ==
All tracks are written by Die Kreuzen.

Side one
No.	Title	Length
1.	"Man in the Trees"	3:42
2.	"Uncontrolled Passion"	1:00
3.	"It's Been So Long"	3:14
4.	"Imagine a Light"	2:21
5.	"Cool Breeze"	3:21
6.	"Counting Cracks"	4:04
7.	"Red to Green"	2:37

Side two
No.	Title	Length
1.	"Among the Ruins"	4:17
2.	"Hear and Feel"	1:27
3.	"Hide and Seek"	2:30
4.	"Conditioned"	1:05
5.	"There's a Place"	3:12
6.	"Open Lines"	2:16
7.	"Melt"	2:42

== Personnel ==
Die Kreuzen

- Keith Brammer – bass guitar
- Brian Egeness – guitar
- Dan Kubinski – vocals
- Erik Tunison – drums

Production and additional personnel

- Rick Canzano – engineering
- Die Kreuzen – production
- Corey Rusk – production
- Jose M. Ysaguirre – photography
