= For Ladies Only (Killdozer album) =

Compilation album of cover songs by Killdozer
- Released: April 1989
- Studio: Smart, Madison, Wisconsin
- Genre: Noise rock
- Length: 34:38
- Label: Touch and Go
- Producer: Butch Vig

Killdozer chronology
Twelve Point Buck (1989)	For Ladies Only (1989)	Uncompromising War on Art Under the Dictatorship of the Proletariat (1994)

Professional ratings
Review scores
Source	Rating
AllMusic	4/5 stars
New Musical Express	9/10
Select	4/5 medals

For Ladies Only is a cover/compilation album by Killdozer, released in April 1989 through Touch and Go Records on various formats, including LP. CD, cassette, picture disc LP and a box of five 7" singles on different colors of vinyl.

== Track listing ==
Side one
No.	Title	Writer(s)	Original artist (date)	Length
1.	"Hush"	Joe South	Billy Joe Royal (1967)	3:49
2.	"Good Lovin' Gone Bad"	Mick Ralphs	Bad Company (1974)	3:23
3.	"Burnin' Love"	Dennis Linde	Arthur Alexander (1972)	4:14
4.	"You've Never Been This Far Before"	Conway Twitty	Conway Twitty (1973)	3:13

Side two
No.	Title	Writer(s)	Original artist (date)	Length
1.	"One Tin Soldier (The Legend of Billy Jack)"	Dennis Lambert, Brian Potter	The Original Caste (1969)	4:05
2.	"Take the Money and Run"	Steve Miller	Steve Miller Band (1976)	2:40
3.	"American Pie"	Don McLean	Don McLean (1971)	8:45
4.	"Funk #49"	Jim Fox, Dale Peters, Joe Walsh	James Gang (1970)	4:29

7" single box set exclusive song
No.	Title	Writer(s)	Original artist (date)	Length
1.	"Mr. Soul"	Neil Young	Buffalo Springfield (1967)

This song was on "Side G" (fourth single A-side) with "Funk #49" on "Side H." The fifth single was "American Pie" split between the two sides.

== Personnel ==
Killdozer

- Michael Gerald – vocals, bass guitar
- Bill Hobson – guitar
- Dan Hobson – drums

Production and additional personnel

- Terry Talbot – photography
- Butch Vig – production
