= Gone Away (EP) =

EP by Die Kreuzen
- Released: 1989
- Genre: Post-hardcore
- Length: 26:49
- Label: Touch and Go
- Producer: Die Kreuzen, Butch Vig

Die Kreuzen chronology
Century Days (1988)	Gone Away (1989)	Cement (1991)

Professional ratings
Review scores
Source	Rating
Allmusic	3/5 stars

Gone Away is an EP by Die Kreuzen, released in 1989 through Touch and Go Records.

== Track listing ==
All tracks are written by Die Kreuzen, except "Seasons of Wither" by Steven Tyler.

Side one
No.	Title	Length
1.	"Gone Away"	3:37
2.	"Seasons of Wither"	4:37

Side two
No.	Title	Length
1.	"Stomp"	2:17
2.	"Cool Breeze"	3:32
3.	"Man in the Trees"	3:34
4.	"Bitch Magnet"	2:58
5.	"No. 3"	6:24

== Personnel ==
Die Kreuzen

- Keith Brammer – bass guitar
- Brian Egeness – guitar, piano
- Dan Kubinski – vocals
- Erik Tunison – drums

Production and additional personnel

- Die Kreuzen – production, mixing
- Richard Kohl – illustrations
- Bill Stace – mixing
- Butch Vig – production, engineering, mixing
- Randy Zorn – engineering
