= Little Baby Buntin' =

Studio album by Killdozer
- Released: 1987
- Genre: Noise rock, post-hardcore
- Length: 38:55
- Label: Touch and Go
- Producer: Steve Marker, Butch Vig

Killdozer chronology
Burl (1986)	Little Baby Buntin' (1987)	Twelve Point Buck (1989)

Professional ratings
Review scores
Source	Rating
AllMusic	4/5 stars
Collector's Guide to Heavy Metal	4/10

Little Baby Buntin' is the third album by Killdozer, released in 1987 through Touch and Go Records. This album, as well as the earlier E.P. Burl, have a much darker sense of humor (focusing primarily on the bleak aspects of society and people) than any of their other albums.

Track topics include a crazy man who throws his mother down a flight of stairs, a man with a "bubblegum face" who "with a sack on his head is still a sexual beast", a man who ends up blowing himself away in his driveway while trying to murder his wife, etc.

According to an interview with Michael Gerald, The song "The Puppy" is based on real-life events. The song is about a biker gang in Madison called "Satan's Dragons", none of whom actually owned a bike, who ended up murdering one of their initiates, or "puppies". The man ended up making some rude comments about the gang leader's wife and was found naked and mutilated in a field with his penis shoved in his mouth. Michael Gerald is quoted as saying "I naturally imagined them being the type who would set a dog's balls on fire".

This album also includes a cover of Neil Diamond's song "I Am, I Said".

== Track listing ==
All tracks are written by Killdozer, except "I Am, I Said" by Neil Diamond.

Side one
No.	Title	Length
1.	"Cotton Bolls"	3:38
2.	"The Puppy"	3:40
3.	"Hi There"	3:23
4.	"Ballad of My Old Man"	3:34
5.	"The Rub"	5:36

Side two
No.	Title	Length
1.	"3-4 Inch Drill Bit"	3:51
2.	"I Am, I Said"	4:53
3.	"Cyst"	3:08
4.	"Never Gave Me a Kiss"	3:46
5.	"The Noble Art of Self Defense"	3:27

== Personnel ==
Killdozer

- Michael Gerald – vocals, bass guitar, percussion
- Bill Hobson – electric guitar, acoustic guitar, cello, percussion
- Dan Hobson – drums, tambourine, timpani, percussion

Production and additional personnel

- Steve Marker – production, engineering, recording
- Butch Vig – production, recording
