= Cement (Die Kreuzen album) =

Studio album by Die Kreuzen
- Released: 1991
- Recorded: Summer 1991
- Studios: Smart, Madison, Wisconsin
- Genre: Alternative rock
- Length: 53:06
- Label: Touch and Go
- Producer: Butch Vig

Die Kreuzen chronology
Gone Away (1989)	Cement (1991)

Cement is the fourth album by the American band Die Kreuzen, released in 1991 through Touch and Go Records. It was the band's final album.

== Production ==
The album was produced by Butch Vig. It was recorded in the summer of 1991 at Smart Studios, in Madison, Wisconsin. The songs emerged out of musical jams, with Dan Kubinski writing most of the lyrics.

== Critical reception ==
Professional ratings
Review scores
Source	Rating
AllMusic	3/5 stars

The Washington Post wrote: "Less monomaniacal than previously but no less urgent, Die Kreuzen turns almost lyrical with its latest album."

Chuck Eddy of The Village Voice grouped Die Kreuzen with Corrosion of Conformity and Prong as bands eschewing "ordinary heavy metal", instead "[wanting] to be jazz bands or something", citing their use of texture, amorphous lyrics, unusual song structures, using the voice as an instrument and abstract cover art, citing the "cosmic Spirograph design" used on Cement. Eddy found that Die Kreuzen "have slowed drastically" over the years, and like Corrosion of Conformity, "their quiet psychedelish parts are more affecting than their loud parts". He described Cement as a "laid-back" album on which Die Kruzen continue to recreate "Aerosmith's bald ballads as lonely vacant-lot bluezak; thing is, I can't even tell where the vocal ozone ends and the guitar ozone begins anymore. Cute barnyard noises at the start of 'Shake Loose,' lots of shapeless howling jangle/mumble and genre-necessitated tempo changes, and the flutes in 'Deep Space' make for a more tasteful headbanger-at-sleep soundtrack than, say, 'Enter Sandman'. But at least Alice Cooper welcomed us to his nightmare."

== Track listing ==
All tracks are written by Die Kreuzen.

No.	Title	Length
1.	"Wish"	3:54
2.	"Shine"	4:53
3.	"Big Bad Days"	3:59
4.	"Holes"	3:57
5.	"Downtime"	4:01
6.	"Blue Song"	5:11
7.	"Best Goodbye"	4:33
8.	"Heaven"	4:29
9.	"Deep Space"	3:42
10.	"Shake Loose"	4:34
11.	"Over and the Edge"	2:55
12.	"Black Song"	6:58

Gone Away (Acoustic) is an uncredited, hidden track on the CD.

== Personnel ==
Die Kreuzen

- Keith Brammer – bass guitar
- Brian Egeness – guitar, piano
- Dan Kubinski – vocals
- Erik Tunison – drums

Production and additional personnel

- Die Kreuzen – production
- Butch Vig – production, recording
