= Burl (EP) =

1986 EP by Killdozer

EP by Killdozer
- Released: November 1986
- Recorded: 1986 at Multi-Trac, Detroit, Michigan
- Genre: Post-punk, Noise rock, Post-hardcore
- Length: 17:45
- Label: Touch and Go
- Producer: Corey Rusk, Butch Vig

Killdozer chronology
Snake Boy (1985)	Burl (1986)	Little Baby Buntin' (1987)

Professional ratings
Review scores
Source	Rating
AllMusic	4/5 stars
Kerrang!	1/5 stars

Burl is an EP by Killdozer, released in November, 1986 through Touch and Go Records.

When Burl was reissued as a bonus on the 1994 CD release of Uncompromising War on Art Under the Dictatorship of the Proletariat, a liner note stated, "BURL was dedicated to the memory of Folk singer Burl Ives, who, it turns out, hadn't even died yet. He may be alive today." Burl Ives died in 1995.

== Track listing ==
Side one
No.	Title	Lyrics	Music	Length
1.	"Hottentot"	Michael Gerald	Michael Gerald, Bill Hobson, Dan Hobson	2:11
2.	"One for the People"	Joe E. Shea	Michael Gerald, Bill Hobson, Dan Hobson	3:24
3.	"I'm Not Lisa"	Jessi Colter	Jessi Colter	2:28

Side two
No.	Title	Lyrics	Music	Length
1.	"Hamburger Martyr"	Michael Gerald	Michael Gerald, Bill Hobson, Dan Hobson	3:21
2.	"Cranberries"	Michael Gerald	Michael Gerald, Bill Hobson, Dan Hobson	3:45
3.	"Slackjaw"	Michael Gerald	Michael Gerald, Bill Hobson, Dan Hobson	2:35

== Personnel ==
Killdozer

- Michael Gerald – vocals, bass guitar
- Bill Hobson – guitar
- Dan Hobson – drums, percussion

Production and additional personnel

- Rick Canzano – engineering
- Corey Rusk – production
- Butch Vig – production, piano
- The Wisconsin Boys Choir – backing vocals on "I'm Not Lisa"
