= Snake Boy =

Snakeboy

Studio album by Killdozer
- Released: September 29, 1985
- Recorded: March 1985
- Studios: Smart, Madison, Wisconsin
- Genres: Noise rock, post-hardcore
- Length: 38:14
- Label: Touch and Go
- Producer: Steve Marker

Killdozer chronology
| Intellectuals Are the Shoeshine Boys of the Ruling Elite (1984) | Snakeboy (1985) | Burl (1986) |

Professional ratings
Review scores
| Source | Rating |
|---|---|
| AllMusic | 4/5 stars |
| Kerrang! | 1/5 stars |

Snakeboy is the second album by Killdozer, released on September 29, 1985, through Touch and Go Records. Fan favorites such as "King of Sex" and the cover version of Neil Young's "Cinnamon Girl" make their appearance on this release. The CD release of this album is coupled with Intellectuals Are the Shoeshine Boys of the Ruling Elite, appearing on the latter half.

== Track listing ==
All tracks are written by Killdozer, except "Cinnamon Girl" by Neil Young.

Side one
| No. | Title | Length |
|---|---|---|
| 1. | "King of Sex" | 3:32 |
| 2. | "Going to the Beach" | 4:08 |
| 3. | "River" | 2:45 |
| 4. | "Live Your Life Like You Don't Exist" | 4:24 |
| 5. | "Don't Cry" | 3:22 |
| 6. | "Cinnamon Girl" | 3:48 |

Side two
| No. | Title | Length |
|---|---|---|
| 1. | "Gone to Heaven" | 3:11 |
| 2. | "Revelations" | 5:03 |
| 3. | "Burning House" | 2:54 |
| 4. | "Big Song of Love" | 3:30 |
| 5. | "Fifty Seven" | 3:37 |

== Personnel ==
Killdozer

- Michael Gerald – vocals, bass guitar, percussion
- Bill Hobson – guitar, harmonica, percussion, backing vocals
- Dan Hobson – drums, backing vocals

Production and additional personnel

- Cyndee Baudhuin – photography
- Robin Davies – percussion on "Going to the Beach"
- Duke Erikson – mixing, recording
- Killdozer – mixing, recording
- The Love of Mike Orchestra, The – backing vocals on "King of Sex"
- Steve Marker – production
- Jessica Noll – violin on "River"
- Butch Vig – mixing, recording, percussion on "Big Song of Love"
