= Killdozer (band) =

American noise rock band

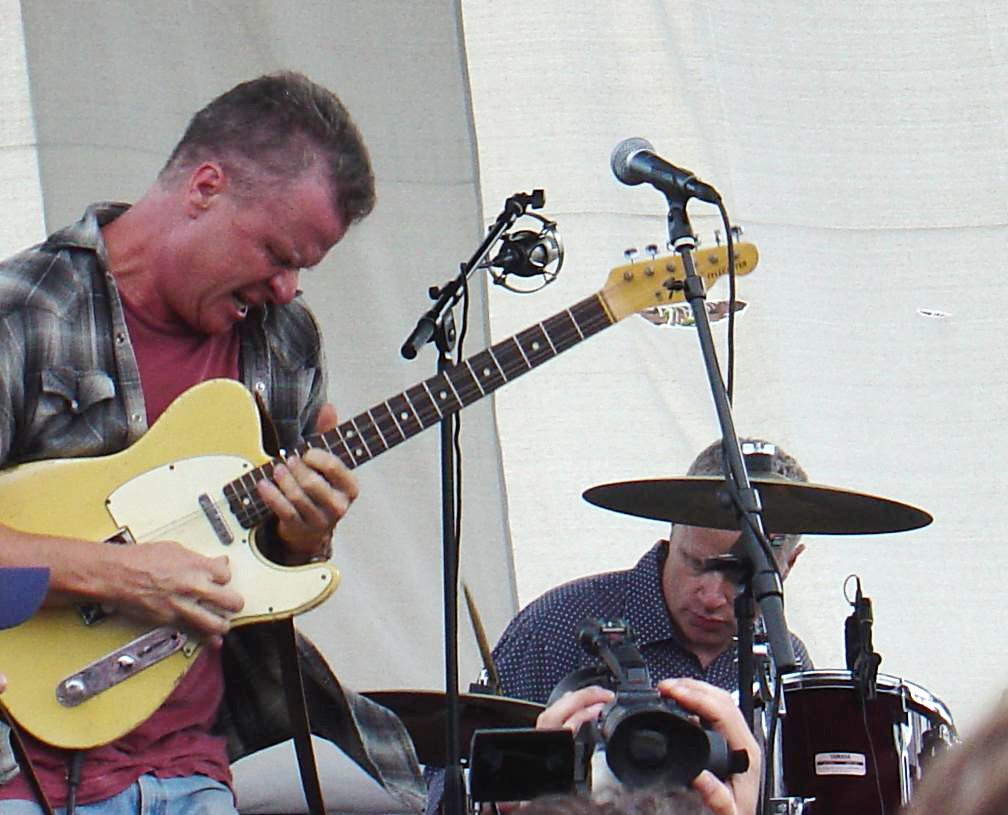
- The Hobson brothers

Background information
- Origin: Madison, Wisconsin, U.S.
- Genres: Noise rock; post-hardcore
- Years active: 1983–1990; 1993-1996; 2006
- Labels: Touch and Go, Man's Ruin
- Members: Michael Gerald; Bill Hobson; Dan Hobson
- Past members: Paul Zagoras; Jeff Ditzenberger; Tom Hazelmyer; Erik Tunison; Scott Giampino

Killdozer was an American noise rock band formed in Madison, Wisconsin, in 1983 with members Bill Hobson, Dan Hobson and Michael Gerald. They took their name from the 1974 TV movie, directed by Jerry London, itself based on a Theodore Sturgeon short story. They released their first album, Intellectuals are the Shoeshine Boys of the Ruling Elite, in the same year. The band split in 1990 but reformed in 1993, losing guitarist Bill Hobson and gaining Paul Zagoras, and continued until they split up in 1996. Their farewell tour was officially titled "Fuck You, We Quit!", and included Erik Tunison of Die Kreuzen in place of Dan Hobson on drums and Jeff Ditzenberger on additional guitar. The band released nine albums, including a post-breakup live album, The Last Waltz.

== History ==
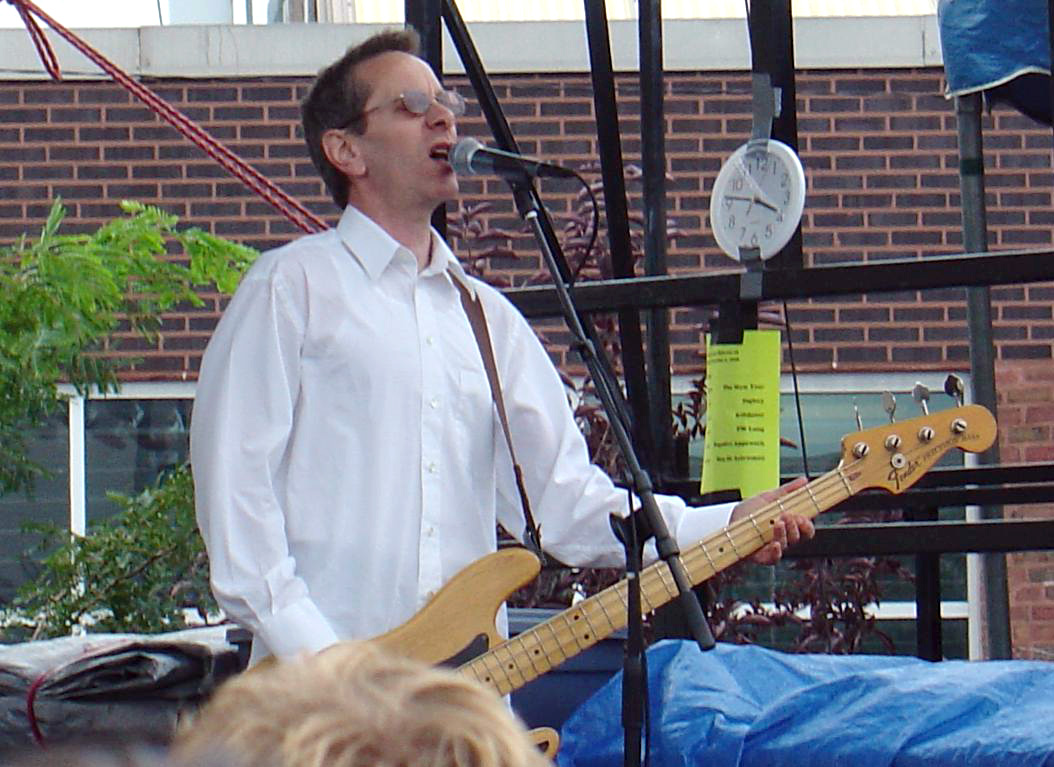
Michael Gerald

The band recorded under the Touch and Go Records label during the 1980s and 1990s and they often toured with or played alongside label mates such as Butthole Surfers, Scratch Acid and Big Black. The band frequently recorded with producer and fellow Madisonian Butch Vig. Steve Albini (Big Black) recorded Killdozer's 1995 album God Hears Pleas of the Innocent. Twelve Point Buck was the album that brought Butch Vig to the attention of Kurt Cobain and Billy Corgan.

Killdozer played with all original members at Touch and Go Records' 25th anniversary celebration in Chicago on September 9, 2006. To promote the event, flyers declared "Fuck You, We Reunite!", harkening back to the name of their farewell tour ("Fuck You, We Quit!"). Subsequently, in response to the audience at the concert "pleading for more Killdozer", Touch and Go announced a handful of U.S. tour dates for the fall of 2008.

Meanwhile, drummer Dan Hobson has remained active in the Madison music scene, playing in several bands, including Cement Pond with Tim Sullivan (of Drug Induced Nightmare No. 4) on guitar, Steve Burke (of The Gomers) on guitar and vocals, and Gordon Ranney (also of The Gomers) on bass and vocals. The group has released one album entitled Vanilla Guerilla on the independent Corporate Hell Inc. record label in 2005. Michael Gerald is a lawyer in Los Angeles. In 2007, he lent his voice to the New Jersey band Hunchback, for their cover of the Christina Aguilera hit "Beautiful", released on their album Pray For Scars (Don Giovanni Records, 2008). Bill Hobson is a grip in the Los Angeles area.

A 28-track double-disc tribute album, We Will Bury You, was released in 2006 by indie labels -ismist Recordings and Crustacean Records. Killdozer itself contributed two songs, one to start each disc: a cover of The Trammps' "Disco Inferno" and a Butch Vig remix of the Killdozer song "King of Sex", originally from the band's 1985 Snake Boy album.

== Artistry ==
Killdozer was notable for its slow, grinding song structures and blackly humorous lyrics, growled ominously by singer/guitarist Michael Gerald at the top of his lungs. Many of their songs were disturbing narratives of small-town life gone awry, and later had a jaded, left-wing political perspective. Killdozer is regarded by many to have helped set the foundation for grunge music, despite that genre's association with the city of Seattle.

The band also became famous for its cover songs, an example being Don McLean's "American Pie". A version exists on their 1989 all-covers album For Ladies Only. Gerald also did a cover of Jessi Colter's "I'm Not Lisa" for the band's 1986 EP Burl, dedicated "in loving memory of" the then-living Burl Ives. The EP in its entirety can be found on the CD version of their 1994 album Uncompromising War on Art Under the Dictatorship of the Proletariat.

== Discography ==
=== Albums ===
- Intellectuals Are the Shoeshine Boys of the Ruling Elite (1984)
- Snake Boy (1985)
- Little Baby Buntin' (1987)
- Twelve Point Buck (1989)
- Uncompromising War on Art Under the Dictatorship of the Proletariat (1994)
- God Hears Pleas of the Innocent (1995)

=== Live albums ===
- The Last Waltz (1997 on the Man's Ruin Records label, re-released in 2006 on Crustacean Records)

=== Compilations ===
- For Ladies Only (1989) – also issued as a picture disc

=== EPs ===
- Burl EP (1986)

=== Singles ===
- "Yow!" ("Lupus" b/w "Nasty") (1989)
- "Her Mother's Sorrow" b/w "Short Eyes" (1989 on the Amphetamine Reptile Records label)
- "The Pig Was Cool" b/w "Unbelievable" (1993)
- "We Will Crush You" 10", collaboration with Ritual Device (1995 on Man's Ruin Records)
- "Michael Gerald's Party Machine Presents!", collaboration with Alice Donut (1996)
- "Go Big Red" ("Sonnet '96" b/w "I Saw the Light") (1996 on -ismist Recordings)
