= Butch Vig =

American musician and record producer

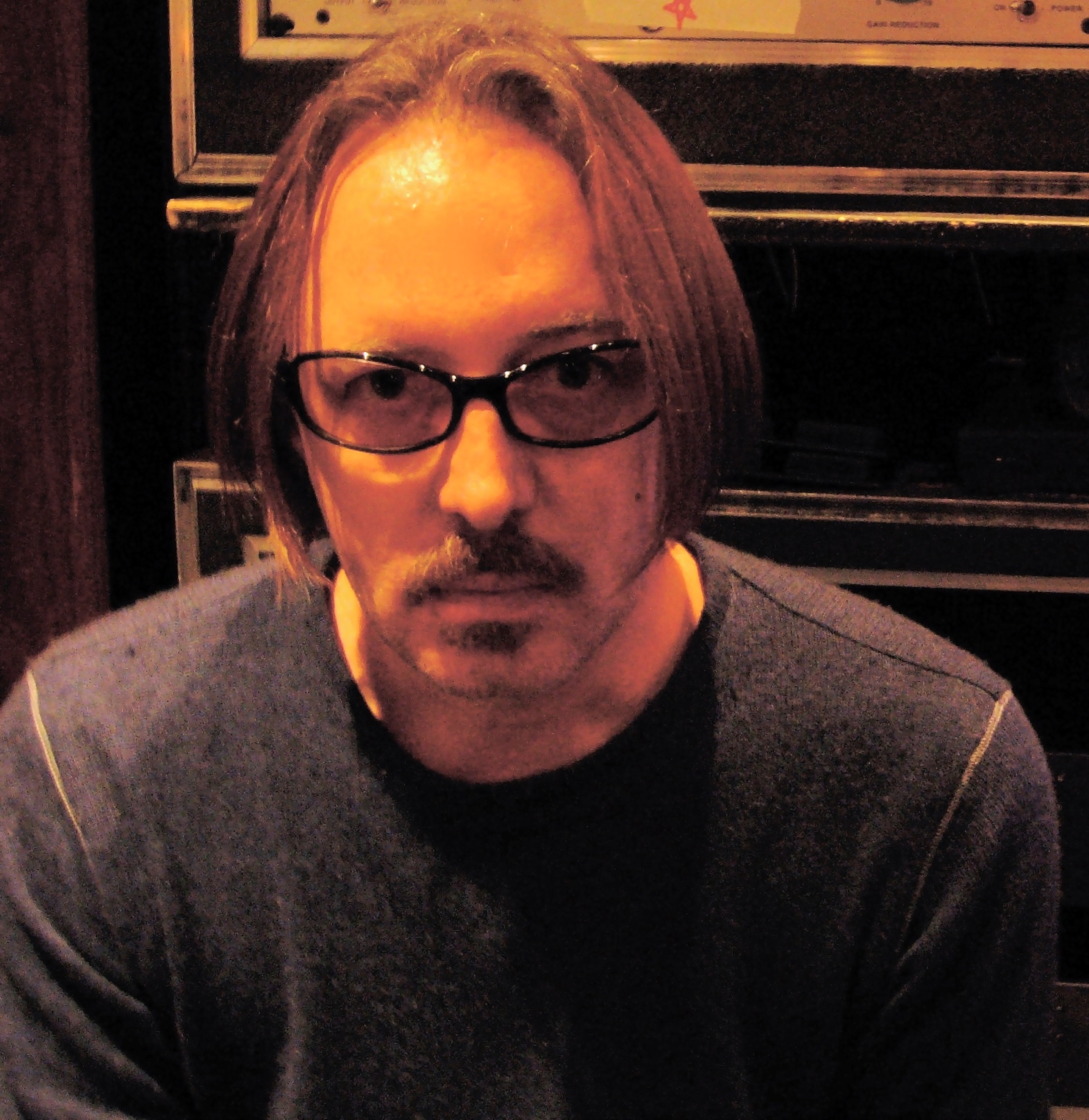
- Vig in 2006, at his Smart Studios recording studio

Background information
- Also known as: Nevermind Man
- Born: Bryan David Vig; August 2, 1955 (age 71); Viroqua, Wisconsin, U.S.
- Origin: Madison, Wisconsin, U.S.
- Genres: Alternative rock; grunge; noise rock; electronic rock; power pop
- Occupations: Musician; record producer; songwriter
- Instrument: Drums
- Years active: 1978–present
- Member of: Garbage
- Formerly of: Fire Town; Spooner; The Emperors of Wyoming; 5 Billion in Diamonds

Bryan David "Butch" Vig (born August 2, 1955) is an American musician, record producer, and songwriter who is the drummer and co-producer of the rock band Garbage. Vig produced for several alternative rock acts of the 1990s, including Nirvana, the Smashing Pumpkins, L7, and Sonic Youth. Notable albums he produced include Nirvana's diamond-selling album Nevermind (1991), L7's Bricks Are Heavy (1992), the Smashing Pumpkins' Siamese Dream (1993), and Green Day's 21st Century Breakdown (2009).

A native of Wisconsin, Vig studied at the University of Wisconsin and performed in local bands Spooner and Fire Town. He set up his own recording studio in Madison, Smart Studios, with bandmate Steve Marker. After becoming well known as a producer, he formed and played drums with Garbage, which sold 17 million records over a ten-year period. Vig returned to producing full-time when Garbage went on hiatus in 2005. The band reconvened in 2010 to record material for their fifth album. In 2012, NME ranked Vig the ninth-greatest producer of all time.

== Early life ==
Vig was born in Viroqua, Wisconsin, son of DeVerne William Vig (1922–2021) and Betty Jeanette (née Brewster; 1931–2005). DeVerne Vig was a hospital staff doctor who practiced medicine with his twin, David, and their elder brother, Edward, in Viroqua for nearly forty years; Betty Vig was a music teacher and clinic administrator who played an active role in the community as a Sunday School teacher, Girl Scout leader, and director of the Country Club and Viroqua Bloodmobile Service. Vig has two siblings, Chris and Lisa. Vig acquired the nickname Butch as a child, due to the severe crew cut his father gave him. Vig studied piano for six years. After seeing The Who perform on The Smothers Brothers, he swapped his piano for a $60 drum kit.

Moving to Madison, Vig enrolled at the University of Wisconsin to study film direction.

== Career ==
=== Early musical career ===
While a student at the University of Wisconsin, Vig met his eventual Garbage bandmate Steve Marker. Vig contributed several electronic music soundtrack pieces to low-budget films, including one song on Slumber Party Massacre, a Hollywood B-movie. This soundtrack work stirred Vig's interest in the manipulation of sound. Vig joined a number of garage pop bands, including Eclipse, and in 1978 joined Spooner with Duke Erikson, Dave Benton, Jeff Walker and Joel Tappero.

The following year, Vig helped Marker build a home studio in Marker's basement. Benton, Marker and Vig also started a small label, Boat Records, to release records of Spooner – which included their 1979 debut EP, Cruel School – and other bands they liked, which led to around twenty local acts. The self-producing was later described by Vig as "kind of a trial by fire".

In 1984, Vig and Marker founded Smart Studios in Madison, while still performing drums in Spooner at night and driving a taxi cab during the day. When Spooner lost momentum, Vig formed a band called First Person with Marker and Phil Davis and a side project called Fire Town featuring Davis and Erikson. Fire Town quickly became Vig's priority, and after their first album was signed to Atlantic Records. Atlantic hired producer Michael Fondelli to work with Fire Town on their second album. While the sessions did not do well, and the resulting record sank, Vig learned a lot of production techniques from the process. Fire Town split, and Vig reformed Spooner for a final album before working as a producer became his full-time career.

=== Production career ===
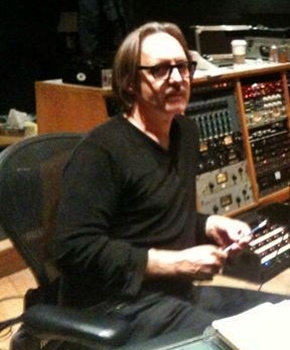
Vig at Smart Studios in 2010

Vig's first high-profile production work was in 1991, when he produced the Smashing Pumpkins' Gish and Nirvana's Nevermind. Vig incorporated overdubs and vocal double tracking, whereas Nirvana's previous album, Bleach (produced by Jack Endino), had a more "lo-fi" sound. Kurt Cobain originally refused to double-track his vocals and guitars but Vig reportedly got him to comply by saying "John Lennon double-tracked". Cobain would later criticize Vig for the album's slickness, although this might be due to Andy Wallace's mixing of the album. Cobain said in a 1993 MTV interview that "Butch Vig...recorded the album perfectly". The success of Nevermind earned Vig the nickname "Nevermind Man", according to the BBC. Billy Corgan welcomed Vig's elaborate production on the Smashing Pumpkins' Siamese Dream. This album met with widespread acclaim and strong sales, breaking another indie band into the mainstream. Vig also produced two critically praised Sonic Youth albums, 1992's Dirty and 1994's Experimental Jet Set, Trash and No Star.

Vig worked with Jimmy Eat World on their sixth album, Chase This Light, released in October 2007. His first production for an English band was 2008's All or Nothing by the Subways. He also worked with Against Me!, producing their two Sire Records releases, New Wave and White Crosses, as well as working with singer Laura Jane Grace on her solo EP, Heart Burns. Vig produced the eighth studio album by Green Day, 2009's 21st Century Breakdown, which won the Grammy Award for Best Rock Album. Recently, Vig has been partnered in duties by his engineer and mixer Billy Bush, who also worked on Garbage's albums and live tours.

Vig composed and produced the soundtrack for the film The Other Side. In 2009, Vig recorded two new tracks for the long-awaited greatest hits release by the Foo Fighters, most notably the single "Wheels" and ultimately produced their April 2011 follow-up, Wasting Light. In 2010, Vig produced Muse's single "Neutron Star Collision (Love Is Forever)", which was featured on the Twilight Saga: Eclipse soundtrack.

In 2020, Vig produced the soundtrack for the 2021 film Puppy Love, including tracks by Portugal. The Man, LP, Mickey Avalon, Wayne Newton, and others.

=== Garbage ===
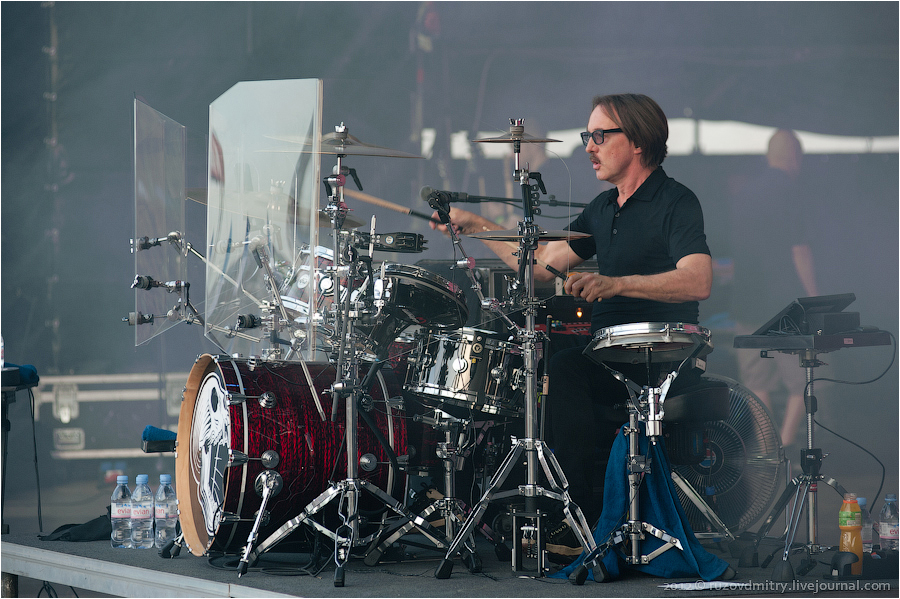
Vig playing drums for Garbage

Vig stated, "Part of the reason why I started Garbage was that by the time I'd done 'Nevermind,' I'd recorded – I swear to God – 1,000 bands that were just guitar-bass-drums. I was reading about all these other records that I was getting excited about – like Public Enemy using a sampler in the studio – and I just decided I wanted to do a bit of a U-turn." Afterwards, they hired Scottish singer Shirley Manson and began composing together.

Garbage released a string of singles in 1995–1996, including "Stupid Girl" and "Only Happy When It Rains". Their debut album, Garbage, was an unexpected smash, selling over 4 million copies and certified double platinum in the UK, United States and Australia. Garbage won the Breakthrough Artist award at the 1996 MTV Europe Music Awards. The band then spent two years working on follow-up album, Version 2.0, which topped the charts in the UK upon its 1998 release and the following year was nominated for two Grammy Awards, Album of the Year and Best Rock Album. Version 2.0 went on to match the sales of its predecessor. Garbage followed this up by performing and co-producing the theme song to the nineteenth James Bond movie, The World Is Not Enough.

Despite being named one of Rolling Stone's Top 10 Albums of the Year, Garbage's 2001 third album, Beautiful Garbage, failed to match the commercial success achieved by its predecessors. Garbage quietly disbanded in late 2003, but regrouped to complete fourth album Bleed Like Me in 2005, peaking at a career-high #4 in the U.S. The band cut short their concert tour in support of Bleed Like Me announcing an "indefinite hiatus", emphasizing that they had not broken up, but wished to pursue personal interests. In 2006, Vig returned to producing while Manson worked on a solo album (as of yet unreleased). Garbage ended their hiatus in 2007, and released greatest hits retrospective Absolute Garbage. Worldwide, the band have sold over 17 million albums. The band got back together in 2010 and began recording their new album, Not Your Kind of People, which was released internationally on May 14, 2012. This was followed by Strange Little Birds, released on June 10, 2016, and subsequently No Gods No Masters (2021). Their eighth studio album, Let All That We Imagine Be the Light, was released on May 30, 2025.

=== The Emperors of Wyoming ===
In 2011, Vig formed an alt-country band called the Emperors of Wyoming with Phil Davis, Frank Anderson and Pete Anderson. They released a self-titled album on September 17, 2012.

=== 5 Billion in Diamonds ===
In 2017, Vig debuted his band 5 Billion in Diamonds. Their self titled debut album was released on August 11, 2017. Their second, Divine Accidents, was released on November 20, 2020.

== Personal life ==
Vig is married to Beth Halper, a former DreamWorks A&R executive; they have a daughter, Bo Violet. They live in the Silver Lake neighborhood of Los Angeles.

== Discography ==
Spooner

- Every Corner Dance (1982)
- Wildest Dreams (1985)
- The Fugitive Dance (1990)

Fire Town

- In the Heart of the Heart Country (1987)
- The Good Life (1989)

Garbage

- Garbage (1995)
- Version 2.0 (1998)
- Beautiful Garbage (2001)
- Bleed Like Me (2005)
- Not Your Kind of People (2012)
- Strange Little Birds (2016)
- No Gods No Masters (2021)
- Let All That We Imagine Be the Light (2025)

5 Billion in Diamonds

- 5 Billion in Diamonds (2017)
- Divine Accidents (2020)

== Production career ==
Vig served as the record producer, or co-producer on the following records:

- 1983: Mecht Mensch – Acceptance EP
- 1984: Appliances SFB – "SFB"
- 1984: Killdozer – Intellectuals Are the Shoeshine Boys of the Ruling Elite
- 1984: Juvenile Truth - no enemy
- 1985: The Other Kids – Living in the Mirror
- 1985: Killdozer – Snake Boy
- 1985: Spooner - Wildest Dreams
- 1985: Tar Babies - Respect Your Nightmares
- 1986: Killdozer – Burl
- 1987: The Other Kids – Happy Home
- 1987: Killdozer – Little Baby Buntin'
- 1987: Laughing Hyenas – Come Down to the Merry Go Round
- 1988: Die Kreuzen – Century Days
- 1988: Killdozer – For Ladies Only
- 1989: Killdozer – Twelve Point Buck
- 1989: Laughing Hyenas – You Can't Pray a Lie
- 1989: feedtime – Suction
- 1990: Urge Overkill – Americruiser
- 1990: King Snake Roost – Ground into the Dirt
- 1990: Laughing Hyenas – Life of Crime
- 1990: The Fluid – Glue
- 1990: Spooner - The Fugitive Dance
- 1991: The Fluid – Spot the Loon
- 1991: Cosmic Psychos – Blokes You Can Trust
- 1991: The Smashing Pumpkins – Gish
- 1991: Nirvana – Nevermind
- 1991: Tad – 8-Way Santa
- 1991: Young Fresh Fellows – Electric Bird Digest
- 1991: Die Kreuzen – Cement
- 1992: Die Kreuzen – Internal
- 1992: Sonic Youth – Dirty
- 1992: House of Pain – Shamrocks and Shenanigans
- 1992: L7 – Bricks Are Heavy
- 1992: Chainsaw Kittens – Flipped Out in Singapore
- 1992: Drain – Pick Up Heaven
- 1993: Crash Vegas – Stone
- 1993: The Smashing Pumpkins – Siamese Dream
- 1993: Gumball – Real Gone Deal
- 1994: Sonic Youth – Experimental Jet Set, Trash and No Star
- 1994: Helmet – Betty
- 1994: Freedy Johnston – This Perfect World
- 1994: Depeche Mode - In Your Room (Zephyr Mix)
- 1995: Soul Asylum – Let Your Dim Light Shine
- 1995: Garbage – Garbage
- 1998: Garbage – Version 2.0
- 2001: Garbage – Beautiful Garbage
- 2003: AFI – Sing the Sorrow
- 2005: Garbage – Bleed Like Me
- 2007: Jimmy Eat World – Chase This Light
- 2007: Against Me! – New Wave
- 2008: The Subways – All or Nothing
- 2008: Laura Jane Grace – Heart Burns
- 2009: Green Day – 21st Century Breakdown
- 2009: Foo Fighters – Greatest Hits
- 2009: AFI - Crash Love
- 2010: Against Me! – White Crosses
- 2010: Muse – "Neutron Star Collision (Love Is Forever)"
- 2010: Never Shout Never – Harmony
- 2010: Goo Goo Dolls – Something for the Rest of Us
- 2011: Foo Fighters – Wasting Light
- 2012: Garbage – Not Your Kind of People
- 2013: Sound City Players – Sound City: Real To Reel
- 2014: Foo Fighters – Sonic Highways
- 2016: Garbage – Strange Little Birds
- 2017: Green Day - Greatest Hits: God's Favorite Band
- 2019: Silversun Pickups – Widow's Weeds
- 2021: Garbage – No Gods No Masters
- 2022: Silversun Pickups – Physical Thrills
- 2026: Silversun Pickups – Tenterhooks

=== Remix work ===
Vig has remixed songs for the following artists: Against Me!, Ash, Beck, The Cult, Depeche Mode, EMF, Fun Lovin' Criminals, House of Pain, Korn, Limp Bizkit, Alanis Morissette, Nine Inch Nails, Michael Penn, M.O.P and U2, as well as his own band Garbage.
