= Rainer Maria discography =

Indie rock band discography

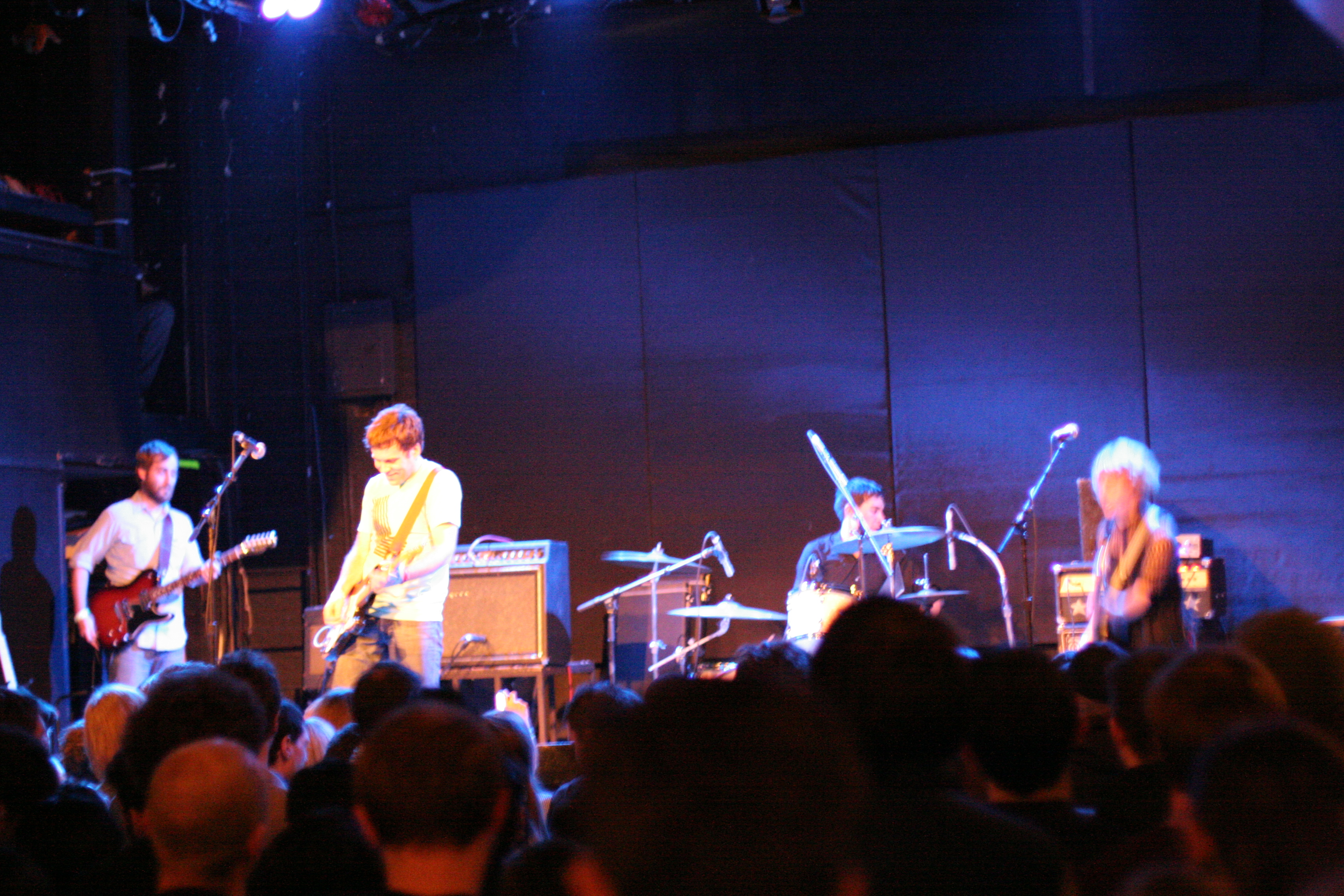
- Rainer Maria in 2006.
- Studio albums: 7
- EPs: 3
- Live albums: 2
- Compilation albums: 1
- Singles: 9
- Music videos: 2

The discography of indie rock/emo band Rainer Maria consists of seven studio albums, two live albums, three EPs, nine singles, two music videos, and various appearances on compilations.

The band formed in 1995 and released an untitled demo tape the same year. It was followed by their self-titled EP in 1996 and their debut, Past Worn Searching, in 1997, as well as the "New York, 1955" single. While they didn't release anything in 1998, 1999 saw the release of a split with the Hal Al Shedad, the Atlantic EP, and Look Now Look Again. 2000 saw the release of the "Hell and High Water" single, as well as their first live album, Live at the Black Cat. 2001 saw the "Artificial Light" single. Both "Artificial Light" and "Hell and High Water" were later released on A Better Version of Me. The Ears Ring EP was released in 2002. A music video for the title track was released in 2003. 2003 also saw the release of Long Knives Drawn. They released their second live album Anyone In Love With You (Already Knows) in 2004. 2006 saw the release of Catastrophe Keeps Us Together, their last album before disbanding the same year. 2011 saw the release of a self-titled compilation of b-sides and compilation tracks.

The band reunited in 2014 to play a series of shows. In 2017, the band announced they were releasing their first album in 11 years, S/T, in August of that year. 2017 also saw the release of the "Lower Worlds" single and a split with Palehound.

== Albums ==
=== Studio albums ===
Title	Release info
Demo tape	1995; Self-released; Cassette
Past Worn Searching	1997; Polyvinyl Records; CD, LP
Look Now Look Again	1999; Polyvinyl Records; CD, LP
A Better Version of Me	2001; Polyvinyl Records; CD, LP
Long Knives Drawn	2003; Polyvinyl Records; CD, LP
Catastrophe Keeps Us Together	2006; Grunion Records; CD, LP
S/T	2017; Polyvinyl Records; CD, LP, cassette

=== Live albums ===
Title	Release info
Live at the Black Cat, Washington D.C., November 27, 1999	2000; Self-released; CD
Anyone in Love with You (Already Knows)	2004; Polyvinyl Records; CD/DVD

=== Compilation albums ===
Title	Release info
Rainer Maria	2011; Polyvinyl; LP, digital

== EPs ==
Title	Release info
Rainer Maria	1996; Self-released; CD
Atlantic	1999; Polyvinyl Records; CDr
Ears Ring	2002; Polyvinyl; CD ...CD

== Singles ==
Title	Release info
"New York, 1955"	1997; Polyvinyl Records; 7", CD
Split with the Hal Al Shedad	1999; Tree Records; 7"
"Hell or High Water"	2000; Polyvinyl; 7"
"Artificial Light"	2001; Polyvinyl; CD
"Life of Leisure"	2006; Grunion; CD
"Lower Worlds"	2017; Polyvinyl; Digital
Split with Palehound	2017; Polyvinyl; 7"

== Music videos ==
Title	Release info
"Ears Ring"	2003
"Catastrophe"	2006

== Appearances on other releases ==
Year	Song title	Release	Label
1996	"Sooyoung"	Direction	Polyvinyl
1996	"I Love You Too"	Ooh Do I Love You: A Benefit to End Sexual Violence	The Core for Care
1997	"Made in Secret"	Free Sampler Spring/Summer 1997	Polyvinyl
1998	"Tinfoil"	Southern Tree & Polyvinyl Fall / Winter 1998 Compilation	Polyvinyl/Tree/Southern
1999	"Put Me to Sleep"	Mordam 1999	Mordam Records
2000	"Artificial Light"	Journey to the End of Twilight	Contact Records
2001	"Breakfast of Champions"	ReDirection	Polyvinyl
2001	"Artificial Light"	CMJ New Music Monthly Volume 90 February 2001	CMJ
2001	"Artificial Light"	This Is Next Year	Arena Rock
2001	"Breakfast of Champions"	Initial Records DSC Catalog	Initial Records
2002	"Ears Ring"	Polyvinyl Sampler	Polyvinyl
2002	"Artificial Light"	Playing 4 Square 2	Suburban Home
2003	"Ears Ring"	The Cornerstone Player 040	Cornerstone Promotion
2003	"Ears Ring"	When We Were Little Girls, When We Were Little Boys	Cydonia
2003	"The Double Life"	CMJ New Music Monthly Volume 110 March 2003	CMJ
2003	"Ears Ring"	Cydonia 2003-12-20 Winterfest	Cydonia
2004	"The Double Life"	Polyvinyl 2004 Sampler	Polyvinyl
2004	"The Double Life"	Summerfest'04	Cydonia
2005	"Ears Ring"	Assemblage v1.0	Grey Two-Eleven Productions
2006	"Catastrophe"	InRadio 4.3 September–October 2006	InRadio
2006	"Burn"	Bank Robber Music Compilation Vol. 7	Bank Robber Music
2006	"Catastrophe Keeps Us Together"	The Cornerstone Player 065	Cornerstone Promotion
2006	"Catastrophe"	Red Ink Music Summer 2006 Sampler	Red Ink Music
2006	"Life of Leisure"	Nobody Dances Anymore	Red Ink Music
2007	"Atlantic"	Before You Go: 2008 Polyvinyl Sampler	Polyvinyl
2007	"Catastrophe"	Live at KDHX Volume 5	KDHX
2008	"Artificial Light"	Girls Rock! The Soundtrack	Cherchez La Femme
2011	"Planetary"	Polyvinyl 15-Years Anniversary Sampler	Polyvinyl
2011	"Ears Ring"	A Brief History in Moving Pictures	Polyvinyl
2016	"Ears Ring"	Cassette Store Day Sampler	Polyvinyl
2016	"Ears Ring"	Polyvinyl Plays Polyvinyl	Polyvinyl
2020	"To the Beach"	Exquisite Corpse	Polyvinyl

== See also ==
- Rainer Maria discography at Discogs
