= Smart Studios =

Recording studio in Madison, Wisconsin

Coordinates: 43.08748°N 89.366468°W

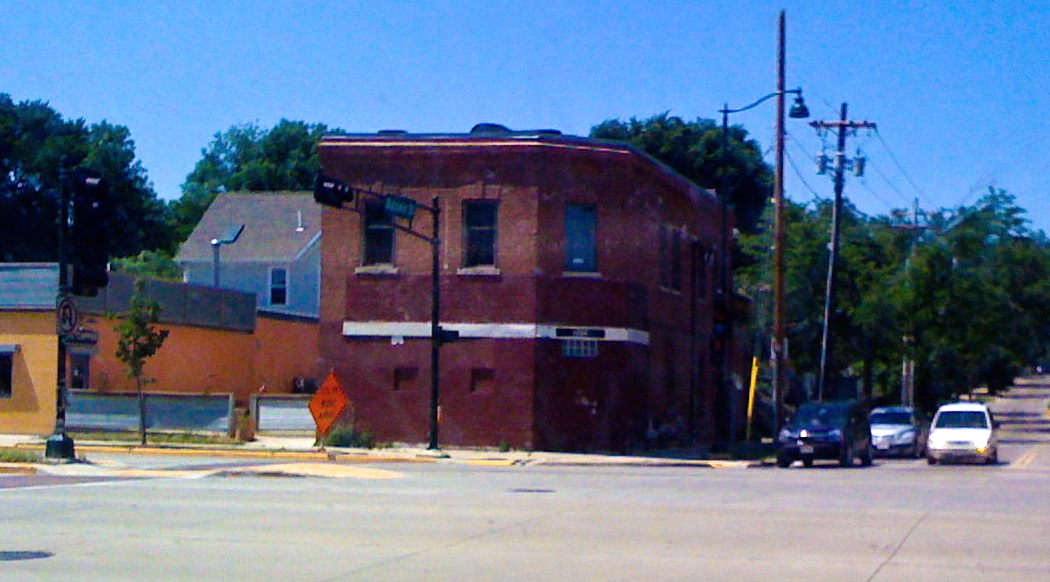
- Interactive map of the Smart Studios area

General information
- Type: Recording Studio
- Location: Madison, Wisconsin, United States, 1254 East Washington Avenue, Madison, Wisconsin
- Completed: 1983
- Closed: 2010
- Owner: Butch Vig; Steve Marker
- Landlord: Butch Vig

Smart Studios was a recording studio located in Madison, Wisconsin. It was set up in 1983 by Butch Vig and Steve Marker to produce local bands. The studio produced bands such as Killdozer, The Smashing Pumpkins, L7, Tad, Nirvana, Hawthorne Heights, and Fall Out Boy. After initial production and remix successes, the building became the recording hub for Vig and Marker's own band, Garbage, who released their debut album in 1995.

The studio and its role in shaping the sound of 1990s alternative rock is the subject of a documentary film titled The Smart Studios Story (2016).

== History ==
The studio survived various mishaps, including flooding, and a backhoe crashing through the walls of the downstairs studio in 2003. On May 1, 2010, the studio closed its doors because of financial difficulties. In September 2013, producer and musician Brian Liston re-opened the former Smart Studios facility as Clutch Sound.

In 2012, the Wisconsin Historical Museum assembled an exhibit on the studio, Smart Sounds, Alt Music, Mad Scenes. Filmmaker Wendy Schneider made a documentary on Smart Studios, The Smart Studios Story (2016), in which she interviewed artists, record producers, and engineers who worked in the facility.

== Works ==
The following is a list of artists who recorded at Smart Studios.

=== Recorded / Mixed albums ===
- Gary Sohmers' Windjammer: Dinosaur Rock – 1983
- Killdozer: Intellectuals are the Shoeshine Boys of the Ruling Elite – 1984
- The Mess: "It's All Wyrd" – 1984
- Juvenile Truth: no enemy
- Killdozer: Snake Boy – 1985
- The Mess: "Untitled" – 1985
- The Crucifucks: Wisconsin – 1986
- The Rousers: In Without Knocking – 1986
- Snowcake: Strangled/SceneZine EP – 1987
- Killdozer: Little Baby Buntin' – 1988
- Tar Babies: Honey Bubble – 1988–1989
- Laughing Hyenas: You Can't Pray a Lie – 1989
- Die Kreuzen: Gone Away EP – 1989
- Killdozer: Twelve Point Buck – 1989
- Shane: Lifeboat Revolver - 1989
- Nirvana: Nevermind – 1990 ("Polly")
- King Snake Roost: Ground Into the Dirt – 1990
- Laughing Hyenas: Life of Crime – 1990
- Rebel Waltz: The Last One To Die Is a Rotten Egg – 1990
- The Other Kids: Living in the Mirror (1985), Happy Home (1986), Grin (1990)
- The Smashing Pumpkins: Gish – 1990–1991
- Die Kreuzen: Cement – 1991
- TAD: 8-Way Santa – 1991
- The Young Fresh Fellows: Electric Bird Digest – 1991
- Mike DeFoy: Sky Pilot (Volume 1) – 1992
- The Wizenhiemers: We Play For Beer – 1992
- L7: Bricks Are Heavy – 1991–1992
- The Rockin' Bones Second Chance To Dance – 1991–1992
- Walt Mink: Miss Happiness – 1992
- Chainsaw Kittens: Flipped Out in Singapore – 1992
- Paw: Dragline – 1992
- Nirvana: Incesticide − 1992 ("Dive")
- Freedy Johnston: This Perfect World – 1994
- Everclear: Sparkle and Fade – 1994
- Poster Children: Junior Citizen – 1994
- Soul Asylum: Let Your Dim Light Shine – 1994–1995
- Garbage: Garbage – 1994–1995
- Sexepil: Sugar for the Soul – 1995
- Archers of Loaf: All the Nations Airports – 1996
- Walt Mink: Colossus – 1996
- Scott Fields: Five Frozen Eggs – 1997
- Festive Skeletons: World of Difference (1997)
- Fred Pepper: On the Inside, Another World Away -1997
- Garbage: Version 2.0 – 1997-98
- Rainer Maria: Look Now Look Again – 1998
- The Promise Ring: Boys + Girls EP – 1998
- Citizen King: Mobile Estates – 1999
- Rainer Maria: A Better Version of Me – 1999
- Garbage: Beautiful Garbage – 2000-2001
- Rainer Maria: Ears Ring EP – 2002
- Rainer Maria: Long Knives Drawn – 2003
- Fall Out Boy: Take This to Your Grave – 2003
- The Lovehammers: Murder on My Mind – 2003
- Split Habit: Put Your Money Where Your Mouth Is – 2003
- Garbage: Bleed Like Me – 2003-2004
- As Tall as Lions: Lafcadio – 2004
- Hawthorne Heights: The Silence in Black and White – 2004
- Death Cab for Cutie: Plans – 2005
- Various Artists: Under the Radar Vol. 1 – 2006
- Sparklehorse: Dreamt for Light Years in the Belly of a Mountain – 2006
- Spitalfield: Better than Knowing Where You Are – 2006
- Jimmy Eat World: Chase This Light – 2006-2007
- Tegan and Sara: The Con – 2007
- Hotel Lights: Firecracker People – 2007
- The Leftovers: On the Move – 2007
- Charlemagne: We Can Build An Island – 2007
- Death Cab for Cutie: Narrow Stairs – 2007
- The GUTS: Let It Go – 2008

=== Producers and engineers ===
- Butch Vig (founder, producer and engineer)
- Steve Marker (founder, producer and engineer)
- Mike Zirkel (studio manager, producer, engineer)
- Chris Walla (producer, engineer)
- Sean O'Keefe (producer, engineer)
- Brandon Mason (producer, engineer)
- Al Weatherhead (producer, engineer)
- Beau Sorenson (producer, engineer)
- Justin Perkins (producer, engineer)
- Duke Erikson (producer and engineer)
- Doug Olson (producer, engineer)
- Tim Curtis (technical engineer)
