= The Aberrant Years =

Compilation album by feedtime
- Released: March 8, 2012
- Recorded: 1985 – 1989
- Genre: Noise rock, garage rock, punk blues
- Length: 162:47
- Label: Sub Pop

Feedtime chronology
Billy (1996)	The Aberrant Years (2012)

Professional ratings
Aggregate scores
Source	Rating
Metacritic	83/100
Review scores
Source	Rating
Allmusic	4.5/5 stars
The Austin Chronicle	4/5 stars
Ox-Fanzine	9/10 stars
Pitchfork	8.0/10
PopMatters	6/10 stars
Under the Radar	8/10 stars

The Aberrant Years is a compilation album by the noise rock band Feedtime, released on March 8, 2012 by Subpop Records. It compiles the first four of the band's LPs, released from 1985 to 1989: Feedtime, Shovel, Cooper-S and Suction.

== Track listing ==
Disc one
No.	Title	Length
1.	"Haha"	2:46
2.	"Fastbuck"	2:39
3.	"All Down"	3:12
4.	"Mandead/ Searching the Desert"	2:50
5.	"Doesn't Time Fly"	3:24
6.	"Dead Crazy"	3:37
7.	"Don't Like"	2:33
8.	"F#"	2:50
9.	"Clowns"	1:54
10.	"Gee"	3:04
11.	"Southside Johnny"	2:17
12.	"I Wonder What's the Matter with Papa's Little Angel"	3:58
13.	"I Wanna Ride"	4:26
14.	"Small Talk"	2:38
15.	"Don't Tell Me"	2:37

Disc two
No.	Title	Length
1.	"Shovel"	2:39
2.	"Rock N Roll"	2:27
3.	"Mother"	2:03
4.	"More Than Love"	1:56
5.	"George"	2:51
6.	"Nobody's Fault But Mine"	2:11
7.	"Fractured"	2:42
8.	"Love Me"	2:04
9.	"Baby Baby"	1:59
10.	"Nice"	1:57
11.	"Shoeshine Suffle"	2:40
12.	"Gun 'Em Down"	1:50
13.	"Dog"	2:33
14.	"Curtains"	4;24
15.	"Safari"	0:59
16.	"Rumble"	2:51
17.	"Plymouth Car Is a Limousine"	1:34

Disc three
No.	Title	Length
1.	"Fun Fun Fun"	1:52
2.	"If You Can't"	1:44
3.	"Last Time"	1:50
4.	"Hear Me Calling"	2:21
5.	"H.D."	1:20
6.	"I Don't Wanna Go Out"	1:51
7.	"Lightning's Girl"	2:47
8.	"Sad, Lonely and Blue"	1:58
9.	"Pure Religion"	3:11
10.	"Play with Fire"	2:18
11.	"Loudmouth"	1:22
12.	"We've Gotta Get Out of This Place"	1:59
13.	"Paint It Black"	3:16
14.	"Street Fighting Man"	1:52
15.	"Ann"	2:11
16.	"Take the Buick"	1:45
17.	"Buffalo Bob"	1:51
18.	"Small Talk"	2:18
19.	"Don't Tell Me"	2:12
20.	"Ann (Au Go Go Mix)"	2:06

Disc four
No.	Title	Length
1.	"Motorbike Girl"	2:28
2.	"Possum"	2:58
3.	"Drag Your Dog"	2:04
4.	"Ever Again"	3:06
5.	"Highway"	2:23
6.	"Confused Blues"	4:21
7.	"I'll Be Rested"	3:00
8.	"Pumping a Line"	3:21
9.	"Meter"	2:05
10.	"Social Suction"	2:10
11.	"Trouble"	2:13
12.	"Valve Frank"	2:19
13.	"Arse"	3:50

== Release history ==
Region	Date	Label	Format	Catalog
United States	2012	Sub Pop	CD, LP	SP 980
