= Jessie (Paw song) =

Song by Paw

- Cover of the UK 12" vinyl

Single by Paw

from the album Dragline
- B-side: "Gasoline" "Hard Pig"
- Released: 1993
- Recorded: 1992
- Studio: Smart Studios in Madison, Wisconsin
- Genre: Grunge; rock; country
- Length: 3:14
- Label: A&M
- Songwriter: Hennessy
- Producers: Paw; Olson

"Jessie" is a song by the American grunge band Paw. It was the first single released in support of their debut studio album, Dragline (1993).

The song recounts Mark Hennessy's family dog "who disappeared when [he] tried to run away from home" at 16. A music video was also released for "Jessie", which was featured in the 3DO version of the 1994 video game Road Rash.

== Critical reception ==
Martin Farrer, writing for the Burton Mail, described "Jessie" as "a powerfully melodic slice of American rock".

Michael Danaher of Paste magazine ranked "Jessie" as the 44th best grunge song, adding that it "oscillates between rock and country tendencies" and "holds its own as an accessible and cohesive unit".

== Personnel ==
- Mark Hennessy – vocals, songwriting
- Grant Fitch – guitar
- Peter Fitch – drums
- Charles Bryan – bass
- Doug "Mr. Colson" Olson – production

== Charts ==
| Chart (1994) | Peak position |
|---|---|
| UK Singles (OCC) | 82 |
