= The Other Kids =

American alternative pop band

- Origin: Madison, Wisconsin
- Genres: Alternative rock, power pop
- Years active: 1985–1992
- Labels: Boat Records, Spinolio Records, Smog Veil Records
- Members: Steve Watson; Allyn Watson; Chris Fink
- Website: theotherkids.com

The Other Kids was an American alternative pop band formed in Madison, Wisconsin in 1985 by Steve Watson (lead vocals, guitars), Allyn Watson (bass, vocals), and Chris Fink (drums, vocals). One of the most popular Madison rock bands of the mid-to-late 1980s, The Other Kids disbanded in 1992, just as the alternative pop sound they were known for began to break into the commercial mainstream. The Milwaukee Shepherd called The Other Kids "probably Wisconsin's best classic pop-rock band, working those Alex Chiltonesque melodies together with empathetic intelligent lyrics, edgy guitars and a solid beat." The band's sound was a melodic mixture of power chords influenced by classic bands like The Who and the pure, guitar pop of The Hollies.

The Other Kids released three albums—Living In The Mirror (1985), Happy Home (1986) and Grin (1990)—on Boat Records, an independent label owned by the Madison band, Spooner. Most of The Other Kids' work was produced by Butch Vig, then the drummer for Spooner and owner of Smart Studios, where the band recorded all three albums. In 1997, five years after the band’s demise, the band's original analog tapes were remastered and released as a double-disk anthology called Neverland. UK magazine Bucketfull of Brains called Neverland "an almost flawless collection (25 tracks and no filler), obscure, outstanding and excellent." The Big Takeover called the album, "a feast of crunchy tunes with superb harmonies, most of them on level with the best work of better known power-pop bands such as the Raspberries, Shoes, and the dB's."

Since Neverland, The Other Kids' songs have been reissued various times, including a Japanese "best of" CD in 2005. In 2007, Chicago's Smog Veil Records began distributing The Other Kids' work on iTunes and other download services.

In 2016 The Other Kids' song ″Madtown″ was featured in The Smart Studios Story, a documentary about the famous Madison recording studio where the band recorded all their work. The song subsequently appeared on the vinyl-only LP soundtrack, American Noise Vol 1: Smart Studios Era, released for Black Friday Record Store Day, November 2016.

In 2024 The Other Kids' song ″Young & Insane″ was featured in Just A Bit Outside, a documentary about the 1982 Milwaukee Brewers.

== Members ==
- Steve Watson: Lead Vocals, Guitars
- Allyn Watson: Bass, Vocals
- Christopher Fink: Drums, Vocals
