= Things That Play Themselves =

Studio album by King Snake Roost
- Released: 1989
- Recorded: 1987–1988
- Studio: Sound Barrier Studios (Sydney, AU)
- Genre: Noise rock
- Length: 40:37
- Label: Aberrant (original release); Amphetamine Reptile (reissue)
- Producer: Dave Boyne

King Snake Roost chronology
From Barbarism to Christian Manhood (1987)	Things That Play Themselves (1989)	Ground Into the Dirt (1990)

Professional ratings
Review scores
Source	Rating
Allmusic	3/5 stars

Things That Play Themselves is the second studio album by noise rock band King Snake Roost, released in 1989 by Aberrant Records.

== Release and reception ==
Critic David Sprague of the Trouser Press called the record a "feverish disc" that warrants comparison to early Pere Ubu.

In 1989, the album was adopted by Amphetamine Reptile Records and re-issued on vinyl.

== Track listing ==
All music is composed by King Snake Roost, except "Talking Turkey" by Sharron Weatherill

Side one
No.	Title	Lyrics	Length
1.	"Worm's Eye View"	Tolnay	3:16
2.	"D.T.'s"	Hill	3:41
3.	"The Ledge Does Vegas"	Hill	4:13
4.	"Everything Falls Apart"	Bostle	3:24
5.	"Hammerhead"	Bostle	2:15
6.	"Acid Heart"	Quinn	2:39

Side two
No.	Title	Lyrics	Length
1.	"Fried"	Tolnay	5:10
2.	"Trogman's Buried"	Quinn	2:41
3.	"Talking Turkey"	Bostle	4:46
4.	"Shunting Yard"	Trigger	2:11
5.	"That Again?"	Tolnay	3:59
6.	"Gutterbreath"	Quinn	2:18

== Personnel ==
Adapted from the Things That Play Themselves liner notes.

King Snake Roost

- Bill Bostle – drums
- Peter Hill – lead vocals, guitar, trombone, harp
- David Quinn – bass guitar, backing vocals, illustration
- Charles Tolnay – guitar, bass guitar

Additional musicians

- Adrian Hornblower III – saxophone (A2, B1)
- Lachlan McLeod – guitar (A2)
- Tom Sturm – trumpet (A2)

Additional musicians and production

- Caroline Birkett – design, illustration
- Dave Boyne – production, engineering, piano (A4), guitar (B1)

== Release history ==
Region	Date	Label	Format	Catalog
Australia	1989	Aberrant	LP	1THING
Netherlands	1989	Megadisc	LP	MD 7906
United States	1989	Amphetamine Reptile	CS, LP	ARR 89168
