= Gas (Feedtime album) =

Studio album by feedtime
- Released: 7 April 2017
- Genres: Garage rock, noise rock
- Length: 36:14
- Label: In the Red Records

Feedtime chronology
Billy (1996)	Gas (2017)

Professional ratings
Review scores
Source	Rating
AllMusic	3.5/5 stars
Blurt	4/5 stars

Gas is a full-length album by Australian garage rock band Feedtime. It was released on 24 March 2017 through In the Red Records. It was the first full-length effort released by the group in over 20 years, and the first since their second reunion. The record was named as one of the best of 2017 by AllMusic.

== Track listing ==
No.	Title	Length
1.	"Any Good Thing"	2:47
2.	"Thought"	1:58
3.	"Box n' Burn"	2:46
4.	"Skilled Enuf"	2:04
5.	"Hopeful Blues"	2:52
6.	"Gutter Roll"	2:25
7.	"You Don't Mind"	3:08
8.	"Fifty-Eight"	1:49
9.	"Sister"	2:26
10.	"Grass"	3:55
11.	"Lies"	2:22
12.	"Keep Goin'"	2:52
13.	"Highway Cruisin'"	1:40
14.	"Shovelhead"	3:30

== Personnel ==
- Al Larkin - bass, vocals, artwork
- Tom Sturm - drums
- Rick Johnson - guitar, vocals
- Zephyr Larkin - engineering
- Mikey Young - recording, mixing
- Carmel - additional vocals
