= Feedtime (album) =

feedtime

Studio album by feedtime
- Released: 1985
- Recorded: Mary Street Studio, Australia
- Genres: Noise rock, garage rock
- Length: 39:38
- Labels: self-released Aberrant (re-issue)

Feedtime chronology
| feedtime (1985) | Shovel (1986) |

Professional ratings
Review scores
| Source | Rating |
|---|---|
| AllMusic | 4/5 stars |
| Trouser Press | favorable |

feedtime is the eponymously titled debut studio album of noise rock band feedtime, released independently in 1985.

== Track listing ==
All tracks are written by feedtime.

Frogside
| No. | Title | Length |
|---|---|---|
| 1. | "Ha Ha" | 2:46 |
| 2. | "Fastbuck" | 2:39 |
| 3. | "All Down" | 3:12 |
| 4. | "Mandead" | 0:10 |
| 5. | "Searching the Desert" | 2:40 |
| 6. | "Doesn't Time Fly" | 3:24 |
| 7. | "Dead Crazy" | 3:37 |

Backside
| No. | Title | Length |
|---|---|---|
| 1. | "Don't Like" | 2:33 |
| 2. | "F♯" | 2:50 |
| 3. | "Clowns" | 1:54 |
| 4. | "Gee" | 3:04 |
| 5. | "Southside Johnny" | 2:18 |
| 6. | "I Wonder What's the Matter With Papa's Little Angel Child" | 3:58 |
| 7. | "I Wanna Ride" | 4:28 |

=== Digital versions ===
When Rough Trade Records issued feedtime’s fourth LP Suction in 1989, the label included the 13 tracks from feedtime on the CD release.

The album comprises disc one of Sub Pop’s four-disc collection The Aberrant Years with the band’s second single “Don’t Tell Me” b/w “Small Talk” added onto the end of its CD edition. Streaming versions of the feedtime album also include these two extra tracks.

== Personnel ==
Adapted from the feedtime liner notes.

feedtime

- Rick Johnson – vocals, guitar
- Al Larkin – bass guitar, vocals
- Tom Sturm – drums

Additional musicians and production

- Cameron Carter – illustrations
- Yvonne Duke – photography
- feedtime – mastering, mixing, recording, design
- Rhino – additional vocals (A3, B6)
- Jonathan Summers – mastering, mixing, engineering, recording

== Release history ==
| Region | Date | Label | Format | Catalog |
|---|---|---|---|---|
| Australia | 1985 | self-released | LP | |
| Netherlands | 1985 | Megadisc | LP | MD 7913 |
| Australia | 1989 | Aberrant | LP | eat 1 |
