= Godzillionaire =

Godzillionaire may refer to:

- "Godzillionaire" - The last song on American rapper Brooke Candy's debut EP Opulence
- "Godzillionaire (band)" - The Kansas-based space rock band fronted by singer Mark Hennessey
