= Catastrophe Keeps Us Together =

Studio album by Rainer Maria
- Released: April 4, 2006
- Genre: Indie rock
- Label: Grunion
- Producers: Malcolm Burn; Peter Katis

Rainer Maria chronology
Long Knives Drawn (2003)	Catastrophe Keeps Us Together (2006)	S/T (2017)

Professional ratings
Review scores
Source	Rating
AllMusic	3.5/5 stars
The A.V. Club	A−
Pitchfork	4.8/10
Slant	

Catastrophe Keeps Us Together is the fifth studio album by American indie rock band Rainer Maria. It was promoted with a US tour in April and May 2006. In September 2006, they appeared at Denver Fest II. Two months later, the band broke up, citing "reasons both musical and personal" for the split.

== Track listing ==
All songs by Rainer Maria, except where noted.

1. "Catastrophe" - 5:33
2. "Life of Leisure" - 3:26
3. "Burn" - 4:16
4. "Bottle" - 2:26
5. "Terrified" - 2:50
6. "Cities Above" - 2:21
7. "Already Lost" - 4:08
8. "Clear and True" - 2:40
9. "I'll Make You Mine" - 3:28
10. "Southpaw" - 3:42
11. "I'll Keep It with Mine" (Bob Dylan) / [Hidden Track] - 13:59

== Reception ==
The Ann Arbor Observer's Erick Trickey wrote that Catastrophe Keeps Us Together "tap[s] the same yearning as Rilke's Duino Elegies and Letters to a Young Poet: the desire to swoon; to embrace deep emotion, good or bad; to feel the tug of some epic force in the sky." Trickey also noted that the album, "shows off Rainer Maria's strengths: De Marrais's plaintive voice, choruses that grow to ever-greater heights when repeated, elusive metaphors about tempestuous intimacy."

== Personnel ==
- Caithlin De Marrais – bass, vocals
- Kaia Fischer – guitar
- William Kuehn – drums, design, photography, concept, layout design
- Malcolm Burn – producer, engineer, mixing, instrumentation
- Peter Katis – producer, engineer, mixing
- George Calbi – mastering
- Spencer Heyfron – photography
- Steve Fallone – assistant

== Artwork ==
The artwork for the album was created by overexposing a photo of Austrian poet and novelist Rainer Maria Rilke, who was the inspiration for the band's namesake.
