= Hotel Lights =

American indie rock band

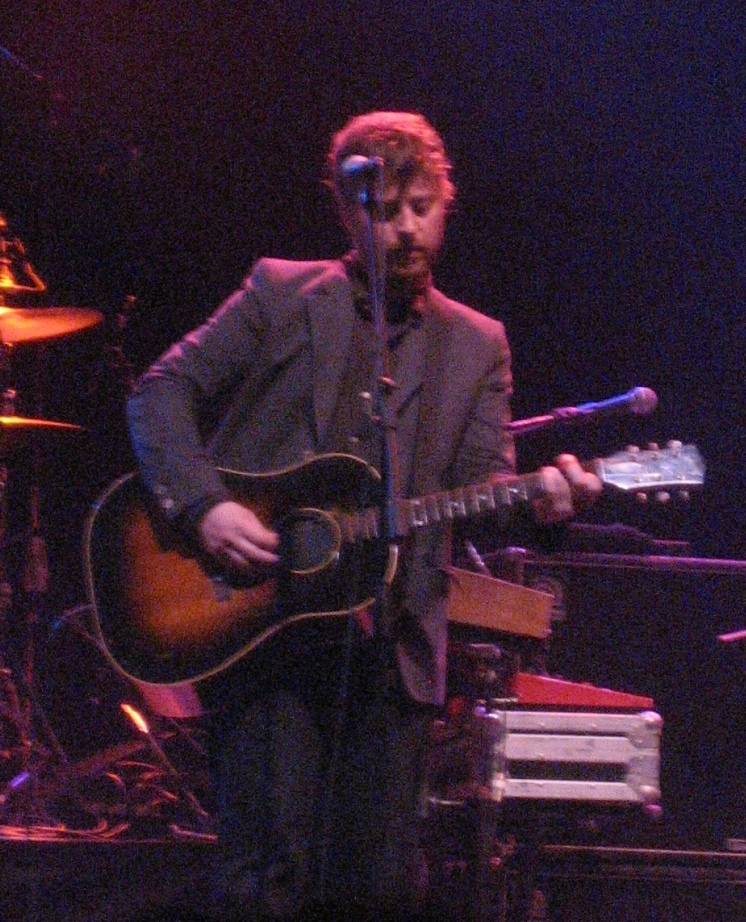
- Darren Jessee of Hotel Lights

Background information
- Origin: North Carolina/Brooklyn, NY
- Genres: Alternative rock Indie
- Years active: 2004–present
- Label: Bar/None Records
- Members: Darren Jessee; Alan Weatherhead; Jay Brown; Zeke Hutchins

Hotel Lights is an American indie rock band led by singer-songwriter Darren Jessee, the drummer for Ben Folds Five.

== History ==
The band self-released the album Hotel Lights in 2004. It featured Archers of Loaf drummer Mark Price and Sparklehorse touring guitarist Alan Weatherhead. It was officially released by Bar/None Records in March 2006. In support of the first album, Hotel Lights toured with Bishop Allen, Tift Merritt, and Nada Surf.

Firecracker People released in August 2008, was recorded at Butch Vig's Smart Studios in Madison, Wisconsin, and features longtime collaborator and guitarist Alan Weatherhead with rhythm section Jay Brown and Zeke Hutchins. The fifth track, "Amelia Bright", was originally performed by Ben Folds Five on their final tour before breaking up in 2000.

In 2009, the band joined Ben Folds on tour in the northeast and supported shows for Mark Eitzel and Joel Plaskett in Brooklyn, NY.

The album, Girl Graffiti, was released August 16, 2011.

Get Your Hand In My Hand, Hotel Lights' fourth full-length album, was released on March 4, 2016. It included the song "Sky High", a song Jessee wrote for Ben Folds Five's 2012 album The Sound of the Life of the Mind.

== Discography ==
- Hotel Lights (2004/2006)
- Goodnightgoodmorning (2005)
- Firecracker People (2008)
- Girl Graffiti (2011)
- Get Your Hand in My Hand (2016)
