= Rainer Maria (EP) =

EP by Rainer Maria
- Released: August 6, 1996
- Recorded: Early June 1996
- Genres: Emo; indie rock
- Length: 19:57
- Label: Polyvinyl

Rainer Maria chronology
Rainer Maria (1996)	Past Worn Searching (1997)

Rainer Maria is the first CD release by American indie rock band Rainer Maria. It was followed by the full-length album Past Worn Searching in 1997.

== Legacy ==
Retrospectively, Maria has been noted as a highlight of emo music from 1996. In 2016, The Daily Dot called its songs "a lasting blueprint" for emo. They cited the band as "among the first to pull off dueling vocals" that would become "a recurring trope in the genre". In 2026, BrooklynVegan's Andrew Sacher wrote that the band "knocked it out of the park on the first swing" on Maria. He also noted the vocals, writing that "the unique qualities of both members' voices create something remarkable when they come together."

== Track listing ==
All songs by Rainer Maria. Track 3 stylized as "Rain Yr Hand".

No.	Title	Length
1.	"Summer & Longer"	3:29
2.	"I Love You Too"	2:45
3.	"Rain Your Hand"	4:23
4.	"Portland"	4:30
5.	"Ian"	2:33
6.	"Made In Secret"	2:23
Total length:		19:57

== Personnel ==
Credits adapted from Rainer Maria's liner notes.

Rainer Maria

- Caithlin De Marrais - vocals, bass; electric guitar (on "Made In Secret")
- Kaia Fischer - vocals, electric guitar
- William Kuehn - drums

Technical

- Rainer Maria - engineering, mixing
- Kevin Ley - engineering
- Joshua Dillworth - assistant engineer
- Mark Haines - mixing
- Wendy Schneider - mixing

Artwork and design

- Rainer Maria - layout
- Pascal - layout
