= Death to Traitors =

Studio album by Paw
- Released: August 8, 1995
- Studio: Pachyderm (Cannon Falls, Minnesota)
- Genre: Grunge
- Length: 58:25
- Label: A&M
- Producer: Clif Norrell, Paw

Paw chronology
Dragline (1993)	Death to Traitors (1995)	Home Is a Strange Place (2000)

Professional ratings
Review scores
Source	Rating
AllMusic	4/5 stars
Collector's Guide to Heavy Metal	8/10
The Encyclopedia of Popular Music	3/5 stars
Entertainment Weekly	B
MusicHound Rock	3.5/5 stars

Death to Traitors is the second studio album by the American grunge band Paw. It was released in 1995 through A&M Records. While the album received favorable reviews from the press, sales quickly fizzled due to a lack of promotional support from the band's label. Paw was dropped by A&M in 1996, before their contract was fulfilled.

Singles from the album include "Hope I Die Tonight," "Seasoned Glove," "Max the Silent," and the five-track promotional EP "Traitors and Covers."

== Track listing ==
1. "No Such Luck" – 4:25
2. "Seasoned Glove" – 3:58
3. "Hope I Die Tonight" – 4:48
4. "Swollen" – 3:00
5. "Last One" (G. Fitch, P. Fitch) – 3:49
6. "Death to Traitors" – 4:45
7. "Built Low" – 5:52
8. "Glue Mouth Kid" – 3:39
9. "Texas" – 3:29
10. "Max the Silent" – 3:52
11. "Sweet Sally Brown" (G. Fitch, P. Fitch, Mark Hennessy, John Licardello) – 5:50
12. "Badger" – 4:28
13. "Peach" (G. Fitch, P. Fitch) – 2:28
14. "Sunflower" – 4:02

UK version

15."Cowpoke" – 4:22

Vinyl Version

15. "I Know Where You Sleep" – 4:35

All songs were written by Mark Hennessy, Grant Fitch, and Peter Fitch, except where noted.

== Personnel ==
- Mark Hennessy - lead vocals
- Paul Boblett - bass
- Grant Fitch - guitars, lap steel, additional bass, vocals on "Last One" and "Texas"
- Peter Fitch - drums, percussion
- John Licardello - additional bass
