= From Barbarism to Christian Manhood =

Studio album by King Snake Roost
- Released: 1987
- Recorded: 21 March – 22 March 1987
- Studio: Sound Barrier Studios (Sydney, AU)
- Genre: Noise rock
- Length: 32:34
- Label: Aberrant (original release); Amphetamine Reptile (reissue)
- Producer: Dave Boyne

King Snake Roost chronology
| From Barbarism to Christian Manhood (1987) | Things That Play Themselves (1988) |

Professional ratings
Review scores
| Source | Rating |
|---|---|
| Allmusic | 3/5 stars |

From Barbarism to Christian Manhood is the debut album of noise rock band King Snake Roost, released in 1987 by Aberrant Records. In 1989, the album was re-issued on vinyl by Amphetamine Reptile Records.

== Track listing ==
Side one
| No. | Title | Lyrics | Music | Length |
|---|---|---|---|---|
| 1. | "King Snake Roost" | Charles Tolnay | Tolnay | 3:04 |
| 2. | "Dead All Over" | Michael Raymond, Stuart "Trigger" Tregilgar | Raymond | 4:44 |
| 3. | "Lonely Hearts Club" | Raymond | Raymond | 4:30 |
| 4. | "Buffalo Bob (The Farmer's Lad)" | Raymond | Raymond | 3:27 |

Side two
| No. | Title | Lyrics | Music | Length |
|---|---|---|---|---|
| 1. | "Godzilla" | Trigger | Raymond | 4:06 |
| 2. | "Napalm Factory" | Trigger | Raymond | 4:13 |
| 3. | "Medusa's Leer" | | Raymond | 3:41 |
| 4. | "Fat City" | Tolnay | Tolnay | 4:46 |

== Personnel ==
Adapted from the From Barbarism to Christian Manhood liner notes.

King Snake Roost

- Bill Bostle – drums
- Peter Hill – vocals, harp
- Michael Raymond – bass guitar
- Charles Tolnay – guitar

Production and additional personnel

- Caroline Birkett – photography, design
- Dave Boyne – production, engineering

== Release history ==
| Region | Date | Label | Format | Catalog |
|---|---|---|---|---|
| Australia | 1987 | Aberrant | LP | SLITHER 1 |
| Netherlands | 1987 | Megadisc | LP | MD 7914 |
| United States | 1989 | Amphetamine Reptile | CS, LP | ARR 89166 |
