= Split Habit =

Split Habit was a power pop band founded in Lemont, Illinois in 1997.

== Overview ==
The original line-up consisted of Travis Brown (lead vocals/bass), Johnny Smoke (guitar, cool-sounding name, backing vocals) and Chris Michaels (drums). The band recorded a four-song demo and began playing small all ages and 21 and up venues around Illinois. Split Habit released an EP, Broken Strings, Broken Sticks and Broken Hearts which was shortly thereafter incorporated into the band's first full-length CD Rockstar 101. The CD helped Split Habit land a booking contract with J. Francis Associates.

The band began touring the midwest and received strong review for their unique approach to pop, but the booking relationship expired after three months. The band's popularity in Illinois and neighboring states continued to grow as Split Habit shared the stage with Stroke 9, Sum 41 and Showoff. The band release another four-song EP entitled E to the P and became a headlining act at the premier all ages venue in Chicago "Metro".

Unable to land a recording contract, Split Habit, continued to tour the midwest releasing Biting My Lip, a five-song EP that garnered a great deal of attention locally and airplay on Q101. During their promotion they played the first of five consecutive years on Warped Tour.

Biting My Lip was the swan song for guitarist Johnny Smoke. Heavily reliant on the harmonies produced between Brown and Smoke, the remaining members exhaustively searched for a replacement. Frankie Cacciato joined the band in late 2002.

In early 2003, Split Habit headed to legendary Smart Studios with producer Sean O'Keefe (Fall Out Boy, Motion City Soundtrack) to record Put Your Money Where Your Mouth Is, their second full-length album. The album landed them a record contract with small Chicago label Double Zero Records. While the album benefited from Double Zero's promotion and radio push, the inability of the label to secure an agent for the band eventually led to the band's release from the label.

In 2004, Split Habit won the Ernie Ball Warped Tour Battle of the bands and headed to Los Angeles for a sold-out showcase at LA's key club. The band had success licensing their music and were featured on Smallville, Laguna Beach, Supernatural and many other programs.

In July 2006, Split Habit played their last show at Chicago's Warped Tour at the First Midwest Amphitheater in Tinley Park after almost ten years of touring.

In 2011, the band briefly reunited to record "Dancefloor" which was eventually released on various streaming formats in 2025.

In 2024, Split Habit released a four-song EP entitled "The Crown" on various streaming sites. The songs were originally recorded in 2010.

== Members ==
=== Former ===
- Travis Brown- Bass and VOX
- Frankie Cacciato III - guitar and backing vocals
- Chris Michaels - drums
- Johnny Smoke - guitars and backing vocals

== Discography ==
- Broken Strings, Broken Sticks and Broken Hearts - EP - 1997 (?)
- Rockstar 101 - LP - 1998 (?)
- E to the P - EP - 1999 (?)
- Biting My Lip - EP - 2001 (?)
- Put Your Money Where Your Mouth Is - LP - 2003
- Put Your Money Where Your Mouth Is - LP, Japan - 2004 (?)
- Limited Edition/The Crown EP - EP - 2005 (?)
- Dancefloor - Single - 2025
