= Keep the Last Bullet for Yourself =

Compilation album by Paw
- Released: 1998
- Genre: Grunge
- Length: 35:22
- Label: Outlaw Records

Keep the Last Bullet for Yourself is a compilation album by the American grunge band Paw. It was released in 1998 through the band's own record label, Outlaw Records. The record is a collection of covers and B-sides that the band had recorded over the years. The album was sold for a brief period online and at the band's live performances, but it is now out of print. The Cheap Trick cover "Surrender," released as a single in 1994, was also included in the compilation.

== Track listing ==
1. "Slowburn (BBC Session)" – 2:19
2. "Street Justice" (Twisted Sister cover, Strangeland Soundtrack outtake) – 3:37
3. "I Know Where You Sleep" (B-Side) – 4:37
4. "Imaginary Lover" (Atlanta Rhythm Section cover, B-Side) – 4:37
5. "30 Days" (Death To Traitors outtake) – 2:28
6. "Surrender" (Cheap Trick cover from the S.F.W. soundtrack) – 3:56
7. "The Bridge (BBC Session)" – 3:47
8. "Remora" (Death To Traitors outtake) – 2:47
9. "Kid Cotton" (B-Side) – 4:16
10. "School" (Nirvana cover, B-Side) – 2:56
