= Firecracker People =

Studio album by Hotel Lights
- Released: August 19, 2008
- Recorded: Butch Vig's Smart Studios, Madison, WI
- Length: 47:40
- Label: Bar/None

Hotel Lights chronology
Hotel Lights (album) (2006)	Firecracker People (2008)	Girl Graffiti (2011)

Firecracker People is the second full-length album by Hotel Lights, released on August 19, 2008 on Bar/None Records.

== Track listing ==
1. "Blue Always Finds Me" – 4:26
2. "Dream State Flying" – 3:47
3. "Down" – 3:30
4. "Flicker in My Eye" – 3:43
5. "Amelia Bright" – 4:05
6. "Firecracker People" – 5:06
7. "Norina" – 3:40
8. "Wedding Day" – 2:19
9. "Chemical Clouds" – 4:03
10. "Nobody Let You Down" – 3:35
11. "Your Choices" – 5:03
12. "Run Away Happy" – 4:24

== Personnel ==
- Darren Jessee – Guitar, Piano, vocals
- Alan Weatherhead - Guitar
- Zeke Hutchins – drums
- Jay Brown – bass
