= Paw (band) =

American rock band

- Origin: Lawrence, Kansas, U.S.
- Genres: Alternative rock, grunge, hard rock, heavy metal, alternative metal, southern rock
- Years active: 1990–2000, 2008
- Labels: A&M, Koch, Nasty Pope, Outlaw
- Past members: Mark Hennessy; Grant Fitch; Peter Fitch; Charles Bryan; Jason Magierowski; Dan Hines; Kyle Hudson; Tyler Chiarelli

Paw was an American rock band from Lawrence, Kansas, formed in 1990. The band's original lineup consisted of vocalist Mark Hennessy, guitarist Grant Fitch, drummer Peter Fitch, and bassist Charles Bryan. After self-funding a demo, they signed to the major label A&M Records and released their debut album Dragline in 1993. After Bryan departed from the band, Paw released their second album Death to Traitors in 1995 as a trio (bassist Jason Magierowski was brought in afterwards). The band separated from A&M in 1996, and worked with Koch Records in 2000 for their final album Home Is a Strange Place. Paw disbanded in 2000, although a brief reunion occurred in 2008.

== History ==
=== Formation and major label signing (1990–1992) ===
Paw formed in Lawrence, Kansas, in 1990. Brothers Grant Fitch (guitar) and Peter Fitch (drums) teamed up with Mark Hennessy (vocals) and Charles Bryan (bass). The band quickly developed a reputation for blending grunge with elements of southern rock and alternative metal. They opened for various bands in the Kansas region, such as Nirvana, Urge Overkill, Tad, and Dwarves. Paw self-funded a demo tape as they recorded at Smart Studios with producer Doug Olson. At that point, the studio's owner, Butch Vig, was still working on Nirvana's breakthrough album Nevermind. The demo attracted interest from major labels, despite the fact that the band had only played around 20 live shows at that point. A bidding war ensued, and ultimately Paw signed to A&M Records. Paw chose A&M based on their artist-oriented approach, along with the label's success with other bands such as Soundgarden and Therapy?, among others. A&M took an unconventional approach to marketing, and initially released two promotional singles ("Lolita" and "Sleeping Bag") under the label name Nasty Pope Records in 1992, although the songs were taken from the aforementioned demo tape instead of their debut album. The singles were used to generate buzz, aimed at college students and fanzines.

=== Dragline and extensive touring (1992–1995) ===
Paw's first national tour was as openers, alongside Reverend Horton Heat, for Social Distortion in July 1992. The band released their debut album, Dragline, in the summer of 1993. The lead single "Jessie" peaked at No. 82 on the UK Singles Chart and it found moderate airplay on alternative rock/alternative metal radio stations in the US. Although Dragline did not chart, its sales surpassed over 200,000 copies worldwide within a year of its release. Paw toured extensively in support of Dragline as they played alongside bands such as Mind Over Four, Therapy?, Tool, and many others, in addition to repeated visits to Europe alongside Monster Magnet. Overall, the band went on tour for nearly 14 consecutive months.

In 1994, Paw's cover of "Surrender" was included on the soundtrack to the film S.F.W., and the song was notably released as a single to promote the soundtrack. Also in 1994, three songs from Dragline ("Jessie", "Pansy", and "The Bridge") were included in the racing game Road Rash. Road Rash was notably one of the first instances of a video game that utilized licensed music from multiple bands on a major label, as all of the artists featured were on A&M at that time: Paw, Monster Magnet, Soundgarden, Therapy?, Swervedriver, and Hammerbox. By the end of the year however, Bryan had departed from the band.

=== Death to Traitors, label shifts, Home Is a Strange Place, and disbandment (1995–2000) ===
Paw's second album, Death to Traitors, was released in 1995. Although the album was officially recorded as a trio, bassist Jason Magierowski was brought in for live shows. A&M experienced internal difficulties by then, as it was noted that promotional material (such as flyers and singles) were not created until after the album came out. Paw headlined a tour of Australia and New Zealand in late 1995, followed by a US tour with Tesla in early 1996. Due to the commercial failure of Death to Traitors and a takeover of A&M by Seagram, Paw eventually distanced themselves from the label by late 1996. That same year, Magierowski was replaced on bass by Dan Hines.

The band drastically reduced their activity by 1997. Paw released the compilation Keep the Last Bullet for Yourself in 1998 on their own label, Outlaw Records, which collected b-sides and unreleased material. The band played various one-off shows, but then went on a hiatus. At one point, the Fitch brothers considered continuing Paw with vocalist Steve Tulipana, although only one show in 1999 was played. Paw was properly reactivated by 2000 after the band was offered a label deal with Koch Records. The lineup consisted of Hennessy, Grant Fitch, and Magierowski, in addition to Kyle Hudson on drums (Peter Fitch recorded in the studio but did not formally join the band). Their final studio album, Home Is a Strange Place, was issued by Koch later on in 2000. Although Koch had outlined plans for various tours, promotional singles, and follow-up releases, none of them came to fruition. As a result, Paw ceased activity after playing a few regional shows in late 2000.

=== Brief reunion (2008) ===
In 2008, after being scheduled on the same bill between their post-Paw bands, Hennessy and Grant Fitch returned and played together on June 6, 2008, at the Revival Tent during the Wakarusa Festival in Clinton Lake, Kansas. Former bassist Magierowski and fill-in drummer Tyler Chiarelli rounded out the lineup. The band played its first headlining reunion show in Lawrence on October 4 at The Bottleneck. Despite playing various live shows, Paw ultimately did not release any material, and the band became inactive once again after 2008.

== Related projects ==
Starting in the early 2000s, the fan-maintained PawBand.com website and the band's Facebook group regularly shared archival content, interviews, and memorabilia, helping sustain the group's following.

Hennessy's book of poetry, Cue the Bedlam (More Desperate with Longing Than Want of Air), was published in December 2005 by Unholy Day Press. He joined The Diamond Heart Club as vocalist from 2006 to 2007, who then reformed under the name 1950 D.A. and made a six-song EP called Low Like Planes, in addition to other online-exclusive songs. Hennessy went on to perform with several other groups, with Godzillionaire as his most consistent project, which was started in 2012. After releasing a few demos and a couple of albums, in late 2017 they took offline their sites due to legal litigation with the lawyers of Godzilla's copyright owners. On January 5, 2018 the band announced the litigation was over, and the band was allowed to continue.

In the summer of 2018, Hennessy announced he would perform the entire Dragline album at The First Annual Corn King Music and Arts Festival on September 1, 2018. The show was not a Paw reunion, as Hennessy was the only former member involved. He performed with guitarist Dan Duncan Jr., along with the members of Godzillionaire (guitarist Ben White, bassist Michael Dye, and drummer Cody Romaine).

Grant Fitch remained active in music as well. Grant Fitch and Jason Jones formed The New Franklin Panthers, in Lawrence, and released on Bandcamp a couple of EPs (where Grant Fitch also released several solo songs). Grant Fitch also played with the Atlanta-area band Guilty Birds. He was also a production manager on a number of productions, including the television series The Inspectors and the 2018 film Faceless. He created the production company Electrical Odyssey as a result.

After departing from Paw in 1994, Bryan retired from the music industry altogether to be a professional skydiver. At one point, he set a free fall record at 321 mph.

== Reception and legacy ==
Paw's debut album, Dragline, received positive reviews upon release and has continued to attract critical attention in retrospective assessments of the grunge era. Rolling Stone included the record in its list of the "50 Greatest Grunge Albums", praising its combination of heavy riffs and melodic sensibility. Goldmine ranked Dragline among the top 20 grunge albums, calling it an overlooked release that deserved wider recognition. Dragline has also been highlighted by online music databases and user-driven aggregators as a notable grunge release from 1993.

Overall, retrospective reviews describe Paw as part of the wave of early 1990s bands signed by major labels in the aftermath of Nirvana's success, with Dragline often considered the band's defining statement.

== Members ==
- Mark Hennessy – vocals (1990–2000, 2008)
- Grant Fitch – guitar (1990–2000, 2008)
- Peter Fitch – drums (1990–1999)
- Charles Bryan – bass (1990–1994)
- Jason Magierowski – bass (1995–1996, 2000, 2008)
- Dan Hines – bass (1996–1998)
- Kyle Hudson – drums (2000)
- Tyler Chiarelli – drums (2008)

== Discography ==
=== Studio albums ===
Year	Title	Label	Notes
1993	Dragline	A&M Records	Reissued in 2015 by Cherry Red Records with bonus tracks
1995	Death to Traitors	A&M Records	—
2000	Home Is a Strange Place	Koch Records	Final studio album

=== Compilation albums ===
Year	Title	Label	Notes
1998	Keep the Last Bullet for Yourself	Koch Records	Compilation of B-sides and unreleased tracks

=== B-sides ===
All released in singles on A&M Records.

- Dragline era: "Imaginary Lover" (Atlanta Rhythm Section cover), "Suicide Shift", "Slow Burn", "Jessie" (acoustic live at WERS-FM radio, Boston, on 11/29/93), "I Know Where You Sleep", songs from the BBC Radio One "Rock Sessions" of October 1993 (broadcast on November 7)
- S.F.W. soundtrack (1994): "Surrender" (Cheap Trick cover)
- Death to Traitors era: "School" (Nirvana cover), "Kid Cotton", "Cowpoke"

=== Rare tracks ===
- Nasty Pope Records demos (all the songs were rerecorded for the first album)
- An unplugged show live at WERS radio (where the B-side acoustic version of "Jessie" was taken). Some songs from the then-upcoming album sessions were also played.
- Death to Traitors demos (from the complete session bootleg). Many songs where left as outtakes: "30 Days", "Remora", "Kitchen" (called on bootlegs "The Kitchen Is No Place for a Man"), "Texas" (alternate version with Mark on lead vocals) and four songs without official names (called "Learn to See", "Year of the Locust", "Lost Highway" and "Goodbye Dress")
- "Street Justice" (Twisted Sister cover, outtake of the Strangeland soundtrack (recorded July 1998, released on the fall of 1998 on the Keep the Last Bullet for Yourself compilation)
- "Gold Dust Woman" (Fleetwood Mac short cover which introduced "Lolita" in several shows)
- "Pansy" (alternate version) and a "Pink Floyd tribute jam" (in one occasion, Kansas '98, the band started playing "Pansy" but Mark started instead with other lyrics, the band followed and then ended with the regular version of "Pansy". But Mark's voice started giving out pretty bad towards the end of the concert, and for giving him a break they started an instrumental jam. However Mark sang some verses from Pink Floyd's "Mother")
- "Innocuous" and ""Filled Up" (in one occasion, 1999 at the CBGB's, a friend of the band named Steve Tulipana substituted for Mark and with him they played these two songs. When Mark returned they rerecorded "Innocuous" as Betty & Mike)
- "Simple Man" (cover of Lynyrd Skynyrd from their last show in 2000)
- Home Is a Strange Place demos (from the Cross the Tracks bootleg, name taken from the early name of the album). Two songs, "St. Jude" (a rerecorded, or an early version, of Palomar's "Substance of the Saints") and "Two Brothers", were not added on the album for budget reasons.
