= Ground Into the Dirt =

Ground into the Dirt

Studio album by King Snake Roost
- Released: 20 June 1990
- Recorded: October – November 1989
- Studio: Smart Studios (Madison, WI)
- Genre: Noise rock
- Length: 40:29
- Label: Amphetamine Reptile
- Producer: Butch Vig

King Snake Roost chronology
Things That Play Themselves (1989)	Ground into the Dirt (1990)

Professional ratings
Review scores
Source	Rating
Allmusic	4/5 stars

Ground into the Dirt is the third and final studio album by the noise rock band King Snake Roost, released on 20 June 1990 by Amphetamine Reptile Records.

== Release and reception ==
David Sprague of the Trouser Press said that Ground into the Dirt "proffers a sound at once burlier and more graceful, not unlike Killdozer fused with Funkadelic" and that it was the best place to start for those unfamiliar with the band.

== Track listing ==
No.	Title	Lyrics	Music	Length
1.	"Cannonfodder"	Quinn	Quinn	2:18
2.	"Stonge's Planet"	Quinn	Quinn	2:38
3.	"Sledge"	Quinn	Quinn	3:14
4.	"Obscure Enough"	Bostle	Bostle	2:01
5.	"Travel Was a Meat Thing"	Quinn	Quinn	3:59
6.	"You Are the Night"	Hill	King Snake Roost	3:29
7.	"I Am Hog"	Hill	Tolnay	3:12
8.	"Adrenitude"	Quinn	Quinn	3:04
9.	"Crowbar"	Tolnay	Tolnay	2:24
10.	"White/Line/Fever"	Hill	Hill	3:06
11.	"Pressure Cooker"	Tolnay	Tolnay	3:30
12.	"Can of Worms"	Tolnay	Tolnay	2:14
13.	"Top Shelf"	Tolnay	Tolnay	3:50
14.	"Zippo Reprise"	Hill	King Snake Roost	1:25

== Personnel ==
Adapted from the Ground into the Dirt liner notes.

King Snake Roost

- Bill Bostle – drums
- Peter Hill – vocals
- David Quinn – bass guitar, vocals, guitar, illustration
- Charles Tolnay – guitar

Additional musicians and production

- Butch Vig – production, recording

== Release history ==
Region	Date	Label	Format	Catalog
United States	1990	Amphetamine Reptile	CD, CS, LP	ARR 89189
