= Snowcake (band) =

Snowcake was a Scottish band formed in Edinburgh, Scotland in 1983 by singer/bass-guitarist Axel Fisher (AKA Alex) and guitarist Ag Holstrom (AKA Agstrom), which was notable for its influence on US alternative rock bands of the late 1980s and early 1990s. Unusually for a band of their significance, they hardly produced any recorded output and their influence was solely due to their live performances.

With a shared love of US hardcore, the 1970s NY punk scene and early US alternative rock, Fisher and Holstrom wrote songs and performed using an early drum machine and a number of temporary drummers, gigging regularly on the then buoyant UK club and university circuit with support slots on early tours from visiting US bands including R.E.M. and Hüsker Dü.

Frustrated with a live success that brought them a dedicated but limited UK fan base, the two looked to the US for their future and relocated to Minneapolis, ostensibly to holiday, but with a plan to be closer to the developing hardcore/alt-rock scene. Hooking up with drummer Mark Mitchell (AKA Zoom) from Cleveland, the band gigged throughout the US for the next two years and although Agstrom's heavily distorted guitar was the default sound of the day on the hardcore circuit, the strength of the duo's songwriting combined with Fisher's sweet voice, vocal harmonies and melodic bass set them apart.

During these years the band contributed to a number of low-budget indie compilation albums for various local US independent labels but known copies are rare to non-existent. In 1987 however, the band recorded a self-financed EP "SceneZine" at Smart Studios in Madison, Wisconsin and 500 copies were released on their own eponymous record label.

During this time one of their Seattle gigs was attended by Kurt Cobain and years later prior to the release of Nevermind and during Nirvana's only ever appearance in Edinburgh, Cobain asked from the stage if anyone present knew how he could contact the band. Through an audience member a message was sent to Fisher and Holstrom who met with Cobain after the latter's legendary after hours gig in the city's tiny Southern Bar.

Fisher and Holstrom's US stay came to a sudden end in October 1987 when they were refused re-entry to the States after crossing over to Canada for a gig and they returned to Edinburgh to consider their next move. This coincided with a raised interest in alternative rock in Britain and with Edinburgh bands The Hook And Pull Gang, Green Telescope and Goodbye Mr Mackenzie enjoying record company interest Mitchell relocated to Scotland to try and help the band net a deal. Their live reputation followed them from America and with a strong three-track demo Warner Brothers, Virgin and Arista showed an interest in signing them but having been exposed to the independence and freedom of the US indie scene the band were reluctant to tie to a major label despite the promotional clout it would have given them.

Plans were made to release their long overdue debut album on their own label and a distribution deal was signed with Pinnacle Entertainment (UK).

By November 1988, the band had finished recording twelve songs for the album at Signal Sounds studio in East Lothian and were in the process of mixing these when a fire destroyed the main studio building and all the album master tapes together with much of the studio equipment were lost.

At this time Axel Fisher who had been suffering from worsening stomach pains for several years was diagnosed with Crohn's disease and felt unable to tour so this, coupled with the tragedy at the loss of their master tapes and ongoing financial struggles, led the band to announce an indefinite break to activities.

Fisher and Holstrom remained in Edinburgh and Mitchell returned to the US however it is believed that he emigrated back to the city in the 1990s.

In the early 2000s, the domain name www.snowcake.co.uk was registered by the members of the band, and a mailing list was advertised which quickly attracted fans with long memories from the UK and the US and although updates have been sporadic it was reported in a bulletin during the 2020 Covid pandemic that fans could expect activity from the band soon.

As at autumn 2025 there have been no new recordings or live performances.
