= Hotel Lights (album) =

Studio album by Hotel Lights
- Released: 2004 (independent); 2006 (under Bar/None Records label)
- Recorded: Sound of Music Studios, Richmond, VA
- Genre: Alternative rock
- Label: Bar/None

Hotel Lights chronology
Hotel Lights (2004)	Firecracker People (2008)

Hotel Lights is the debut album by Hotel Lights, a pop/indie group. It was released in 2006.

== Track listing ==
1. "You Come and I Go" – 3:12
2. "A.M. Slow Golden Hit" – 3:56
3. "Miles Behind Me" – 4:09
4. "I Am a Train" – 3:47
5. "Small Town Shit" – 5:24
6. "What You Meant" – 3:04
7. "Follow Through" – 5:22
8. "Stumblin' Home Winter Blues" – 3:02
9. "Marvelous Truth" – 3:37
10. "The Mumbling Years"
11. "Anatole" – 4:00
12. "Motionless" – 4:31
13. "Love to Try" – 6:24

== Personnel ==
- Darren Jessee – guitar, piano, vocals
- Chris Badger – guitar, piano
- Roger Gupton – electric bass, background vocals
- Mark Price – drums
- Alan Weatherhead – pedal steel
