= Mark Hennessy =

American singer (born 1969)

- Born: Mark Thomas Hennessy; 1969 (age 56–57)
- Origin: Lawrence, Kansas, U.S.
- Genres: Grunge, alternative
- Occupations: Musician, songwriter, poet, teacher
- Instrument: Vocals
- Years active: 1992–present
- Labels: A&M Records, E1 Entertainment

Mark Thomas Hennessy (born 1969) is an American singer and songwriter. He is most famous for being the lead singer of the alternative rock band Paw. He is also the former lead singer of Lawrence, Kansas-based bands King Rat, The Diamond Heart Club, 1950 D.A., and is currently the singer for Godzillionaire.

He is a self-proclaimed "poetry freak". In 2005, he released a book of poetry called Cue the Bedlam (More Desperate With Longing Than Want of Air), which was published in December 2005 by Unholy Day Press.

He completed a doctoral degree at the University of Kansas.

== Music ==
Mark started singing in the Saint John's Choir, then created his own band, King Rat. Hennessy was the lead vocalist and the main lyricist of the grunge band Paw. They recorded two major label releases, Dragline and Death to Traitors, and the EP Home Is a Strange Place. His voice was described in Kerrang! magazine as "gargling glass". In 2007, he sang in a seven-piece band called The Diamond Heart Club. The band split up a year later. They reformed under the name 1950 D.A. and split again. Currently Mark is playing in his new project, Godzillionaire.
