= Shovel (album) =

Studio album by Feedtime
- Released: 1986
- Recorded: Sound Barrier Studios, Sydney, Australia
- Genre: Noise rock, garage rock
- Length: 37:12
- Label: Aberrant

Feedtime chronology
feedtime (1985)	Shovel (1986)	Cooper-S (1988)

Professional ratings
Review scores
Source	Rating
AllMusic	4/5 stars
Robert Christgau	A−
Trouser Press	very favorable

Shovel is the second studio album by noise rock band Feedtime, released in 1986 by Aberrant Records.

== Track listing ==
All tracks are written by feedtime, except "Nobody's Fault But Mine" by Blind Willie Johnson

Side one
No.	Title	Length
1.	"Shovel"	2:39
2.	"Rock N Roll"	2:28
3.	"Mother"	2:04
4.	"More Than Love"	1:57
5.	"George"	2:51
6.	"Nobody's Fault But Mine"	2:11
7.	"Fractured"	2:42

Side two
No.	Title	Length
1.	"Love Me"	2:04
2.	"Baby Baby"	1:59
3.	"Nice"	1:57
4.	"Shoeshine Shuffle"	2:40
5.	"Gun 'Em Down"	1:51
6.	"Dog"	2:33
7.	"Curtains"	4:24

== Personnel ==
Adapted from the Shovel liner notes.

feedtime

- Rick Johnson – vocals, guitar
- Al Larkin – bass guitar, vocals
- Tom Sturm – drums

Additional musicians

- Holy Roller Gospel Choir – choir (A6)
- Adrian Hornblower – saxophone (B7)

Production and design

- Alex – illustrations
- Yvonne Duke – photography
- feedtime – mixing, design
- Guru – photography
- Isabel – photography
- Minda – illustrations
- Jonathan Summers – engineering, mixing

== Release history ==
Region	Date	Label	Format	Catalog
United States	1986	Rough Trade	CS, LP	RoughUS35
Netherlands	1986	Megadisc	LP	MD 7913
Australia	1987	Aberrant	LP	shovel 1
