= The Smart Studios Story =

- Release poster
- Directed by: Wendy Schneider
- Written by: Wendy Schneider
- Edited by: Wendy Schneider
- Production company: Coney Island Studios
- Distributed by: American Noise
- Release date: March 16, 2016 (SXSW Film Festival)
- Running time: 90 minutes
- Country: United States
- Language: English

The Smart Studios Story is a 2016 documentary film written, directed and co-produced by Wendy Schneider. It chronicles the history of Madison, Wisconsin-based recording studio Smart Studios, founded by Butch Vig and Steve Marker in 1983, and its impact on the 1990s alternative rock sound. The film was successfully funded via Kickstarter in 2014, and 70 hours of footage was shot on 16 mm film.

The Smart Studios Story premiered on March 16, 2016 at the SXSW Film Festival. On Record Store Day 2016, a promotional cassette featuring over a dozen bands that recorded at the studio was made available at participating record stores in the U.S., and the film was also released on DVD with a vinyl compilation, American Noise Vol. 1, featuring early studio recordings. It was released on iTunes on March 7, 2017. The film received positive reviews from critics.

== Appearances ==
The documentary features interviews with artists associated with the studio as well as producers, engineers, and label executives, including:

- Jeff Castelaz
- Jimmy Chamberlin
- Larry Crane
- Billy Corgan
- Duke Erikson
- Laura Jane Grace
- Dave Grohl
- Shirley Manson
- Steve Marker
- Jonathan Poneman
- Ben Sidran
- Donita Sparks
- Butch Vig
- Chris Walla
- Tom Hazelmyer

Members of the bands Killdozer, Die Kreuzen, Bongzilla, Tar Babies, Young Fresh Fellows, Spooner, Tad, Urge Overkill, Laughing Hyenas, Chainsaw Kittens, Cosmic Psychos, The Crucifucks, and Poster Children, among others, also appear in the film.

== Production ==
After it was reported in January 2010 that Smart Studios would be closing later that year, Schneider announced that production for the documentary was underway. She requested materials such as video, pictures and audio from studio sessions or live shows, along with submissions of cover art, flyers, video testimonials and written stories about the recording facility. Schneider began funding the project via Kickstarter on February 23, 2014, seeking to raise $120,000 by March 30. The crowdfunding campaign was a success, raising $122,230. Schneider shot 70 hours of footage on 16 mm film.

== Release ==
The Smart Studios Story was selected as the official film of Record Store Day 2016. A promotional cassette featuring more than a dozen bands recorded at the studio was made available at participating record stores across the United States on Record Store Day 2016. The film had its world premiere on March 16, 2016 at the SXSW Film Festival. It opened the Chicago International Movies and Music Festival on April 13, 2016, and was screened at the Wisconsin Film Festival on April 17, 2016. The film was also screened in 10 US states and Washington, D.C. from October to December.

A Tour Edition DVD was released for Record Store Day Black Friday 2016, along with a vinyl compilation of early Smart Studio recordings titled American Noise: Volume 1. An iTunes release followed on March 7, 2017. The second soundtrack compilation vinyl, American Noise: Volume 2, was released in 2019.

== Reception ==
The Smart Studios Story received positive reviews from critics. Dennis Harvey of Variety considered the film a "whirlwind tour of a busy if largely subterranean epoch whose long, often fleetingly glimpsed talent roster should pique the curiosity (and/or nostalgia) of alt-rock archaeologists." Writing for Consequence, Michael Roffman deemed its length "all-too-lean" as it does not allow for comprehensively "trac[ing] the roots of [the Alternative] movement back to not only Smart Studios but the Midwest in general", but praised Schneider's "fine job" of bringing the stories to life with archive footage and found the film to be "an enjoyable and enlightening watch" and "a breezy music lesson". Nick Allen of RogerEbert.com called The Smart Studios Story "a really solid documentary that should satisfy music fans and Killdozer enthusiasts alike."
