= Cooper-S =

Studio album of cover songs by feedtime
- Released: 1988
- Genre: Noise rock
- Length: 31:53
- Label: Rough Trade

feedtime chronology
Shovel (1986)	Cooper-S (1988)	Suction (1989)

Professional ratings
Review scores
Source	Rating
Allmusic	3/5 stars
Robert Christgau	B

Cooper-S is a cover album and the third studio album by Australian noise rock band feedtime, released in 1988 BY Rough Trade Records.

== Track listing ==
Side one
No.	Title	Writer(s)	Original artist (date)	Length
1.	"Fun, Fun, Fun"	Mike Love, Brian Wilson	The Beach Boys (1964)	1:51
2.	"If You Can't"	e. e. cummings		1:41
3.	"The Last Time"	Mick Jagger, Keith Richards	The Rolling Stones (1965)	1:54
4.	"Hear Me Calling"	Alvin Lee	Ten Years After (1969)	2:21
5.	"H.D."	Steven Borg		1:20
6.	"I Don't Wanna Go Out"	Steve Lucas, Ian Rilen	X (1979)	1:51
7.	"Lightning's Girl"	Lee Hazlewood		2:46
8.	"Sad and Lonely and Blue"	Stevie Wright, George Young	The Easybeats (1966)	1:58

Side two
No.	Title	Writer(s)	Original artist (date)	Length
1.	"Pure Religion"			3:11
2.	"Play With Fire"	Nanker Phelge	The Rolling Stones (1965)	2:18
3.	"Loudmouth"	Dee Dee Ramone, Johnny Ramone	Ramones (1976)	1:22
4.	"We Gotta Get out of This Place"	Barry Mann, Cynthia Weil	The Animals (1965)	1:59
5.	"Paint It, Black"	Mick Jagger, Keith Richards	The Rolling Stones (1966)	3:18
6.	"Street Fighting Man"	Mick Jagger, Keith Richards	The Rolling Stones (1968)	1:51
7.	"Ann"	Dave Alexander, Ron Asheton, Scott Asheton, Iggy Pop	The Stooges (1969)	2:12

== Personnel ==
Adapted from the Cooper-S liner notes.

feedtime

- Rick Johnson – vocals, guitar
- Al Larkin – bass guitar
- Tom Sturm – drums, trumpet

Additional musicians and production

- Blind Full Throttle – guitar (B7)
- Dave – vocals (B1)
- Adrian Hornblower – saxophone
- Rhino – vocals (A7, A8)

== Release history ==
Region	Date	Label	Format	Catalog
Australia	1988	Aberrant	LP	S1
Netherlands	1988	Megadisc	LP	MD 7911
United States	1988	Rough Trade	LP	RoughUS39
