= Ears Ring =

Ears Ring (EP) is a 2002 EP by the indie rock band Rainer Maria. The title track of the EP also appears on the band's 2003 album Long Knives Drawn.

== Background ==
The Ears Ring EP was recorded during the same sessions as the Long Knives Drawn album. Despite scarce promotion, the album was heavily added on college radio. The music video for "Ears Ring" was loosely based on No Exit, a 1944 existentialist play by Jean-Paul Sartre.

== Critical reception ==
The EP received generally favorable reviews from critics and support from publications such as Alternative Press, CMJ, The New York Times and Magnet, as well as online publications. Jason Dungan of Dusted Magazine praised the EP's immediacy and "esoteric lyrical approach", while Scott Heisel of PunkNews called it "the best EP I've gotten all year".

== Track listing ==
All tracks composed by Rainer Maria.

1. "Ears Ring" – 3:44
2. "Alchemy" – 2:16
3. "Automatic" – 3:32

== Personnel ==
- Caithlin De Marrais – bass, vocals
- Kyle Fischer – guitar, vocals
- William Kuehn – drums
