= Billy (Feedtime album) =

Studio album by feedtime
- Released: March 23, 1996
- Genre: Noise rock
- Length: 27:29
- Label: Amphetamine Reptile

Feedtime chronology
Suction (1989)	Billy (1996)	The Aberrant Years (2012)

Professional ratings
Review scores
Source	Rating
Allmusic	3/5 stars
RIP	4/5 stars

Billy is the fifth album of noise rock band feedtime, released on March 23, 1996 by Amphetamine Reptile Records. It was the band's first album after they went on hiatus in 1989.

Tom Hazelmyer, founder and owner of Amphetamine Reptile, named Billy one of his favourite releases.

== Track listing ==
All tracks are written by feedtime, except where noted.

No.	Title	Writer(s)	Length
1.	"Billy"		2:39
2.	"You Don't Know My Mind"		2:12
3.	"Melody Line"		3:07
4.	"Long Haul"		3:12
5.	"Hero"		1:49
6.	"Wagon"		2:42
7.	"G-Slap"		3:08
8.	"Vigilante Man"	Woody Guthrie	3:11
9.	"You"	Randy Edelman	2:19
10.	"Relax Your Mind"		3:11

== Personnel ==
Adapted from the Billy liner notes.

feedtime

- Rick Johnson – vocals, guitar
- Al Larkin – bass guitar
- Tom Sturm – drums

Additional musicians and production

- David Carter – congas
- Peter H. Kemp – photography
- Steve Smart – mastering
- Dave Trump – engineering, mixing
- Greg Wales – engineering, mixing

== Release history ==
Region	Date	Label	Format	Catalog
United States	1996	Amphetamine Reptile	CD	AMREP 056
Germany	1996	Amphetamine Reptile	CD, LP	ARR 72/015
