= Feedtime =

Australian noise rock band

- Origin: Sydney, New South Wales, Australia
- Genres: Noise rock, punk rock, punk blues, garage rock, garage punk, blues-rock
- Years active: 1979–1989; 1995–1997; 2011–present
- Labels: Feedtime, Aberrant, Black Hole, Amphetamine Reptile, In the Red, Sub Pop, Rough Trade
- Members: Allen Larkin; Rick Johnson; Tom Sturm
- Past members: Dave Carter; Nella Mobbs; John Larkin

Feedtime (stylised as feedtime) is an Australian noise rock band from Sydney, New South Wales, that was initially formed as a duo in 1979 by Rick Johnson on guitar and vocals and Allen Larkin on bass guitar and vocals. They soon became a trio with various drummers until 1982, when they were joined by Tom Sturm. This line-up issued four albums, Feedtime (late 1985), Shovel (February 1987), Cooper-S (May 1988) and Suction (early 1989), before disbanding in February 1989. They reunited in 1995 with Johnson and Larkin joined by the latter's younger brother, John Larkin, on drums for another album, Billy (April 1996), before disbanding again in 1997. The Rick-Al-Tom line up reunited again, in 2011.

== History ==
Rick Johnson and Allen Larkin had met at a Parramatta secondary school in the early 1970s. They formed Feedtime, in December 1979, as a duo with Johnson on guitar and lead vocals and Larkin on bass guitar and vocals. The band's name is stylised with a lowercase 'f'. They were soon joined on drums by Dave Carter who was replaced, in turn, by Nella Mobbs and, in 1982, by Tom Sturm.

The group's debut album, Feedtime, was independently released late in 1985. Australian musicologist, Ian McFarlane, felt their "music mixed grinding guitars and driving beats with an unsettling ambience." John L. Murphy of PopMatters opined that they "approached maximum if not R&B than blues-punk. Certainly raw, they reissued sound oddly spacious within unsettling digital clarity. Allen's frazzled bass, Rick's churning 'electric slide guitar', and Tom's primal drums thud like their names: no nonsense, no added frills." Ned Raggett of AllMusic described the album, "From the opening hoarse crawl and gargle of 'Ha Ha,' feedtime on its debut sounds like its members were out to not merely perforate eardrums, but flat out bludgeon skulls."

Their debut single, "Fractured", was issued in September 1986 via Sydney-based label, Aberrant Records. It presaged their second album, Shovel (February 1987), which, along with the subsequent Aberrant albums, was also released in the United States via Rough Trade Records. AllMusic's John Dougan felt it was "perhaps their best album, but it's definitely not for the faint of heart. Simplistic, crudely played, thuddingly repetitive rock muck punctuated by harsh vocals... [with] some of the most extreme music to be considered rock & roll ever conceived." Robert Christgau opined that they were a "little slower and more old-fashioned than the IRT the Ramones/Dolls came in on, which definitely doesn't mean they're slow or old-fashioned. Just an art band cum power trio that's spent nine years perfecting its sonic wisdom."

In May 1988 they issued their third studio album, Cooper-S; according to McFarlane it "featured all cover versions done in the inimitable feedtime style of raw and heavy thrash." Christgau felt "Most cover albums trip over their own roots – self-conscious simplicity is too neat a trick to bring off a dozen times running." Trouser Press' Andrea Enthal and Ira Robbins observed that it "applies Feedtime's noisy shredder to cover versions... with its tuneless spirited roar, feedback slide experiments and an occasionally untuned bass. Without casting aspersions on Feedtime, it's safe to assume that none of the songs' authors would be able to recognize their handiwork in these rumbling renditions."

A fourth studio album, Suction (early 1989), appeared prior to the group's disbandment in February. Raggett opined that the "last album of their 1980s existence makes for one hell of a farewell. Whether or not it was the exercise of the covers album Cooper-S that found the trio letting its hooks come forward more than ever, Suction easily challenges (and often beats) the Jesus and Mary Chain when it comes to the 'melody + noise' equation."

The group had been planning their first US tour when "emotional and psychological issues" resulted in their break up: Johnson "later admitted to have suffered a nervous breakdown." He recalled, "I got to the point where I would either kill myself or commit murder." He later clarified that Feedtime "broke up because I was having a breakdown, that's all. There was a lot of anger and darkness that underlaid a lot of feedtime's makeup. I had to remake myself or die. Allen felt that he might have to do some repair work as well. ... Some stuff about feedtime involves very hard stuff and needs to be left alone."

McFarlane declared that they were "one of the most uncompromising and influential groups to emerge from [Sydney]'s early 1980s inner-city scene... there was only one other band that could match them for sheer sonic force and rhythmic density: the notorious X." Feedtime made four albums in the 1980s. Initially they recorded for Aberrant Records in Australia, but their second through fourth albums were released internationally by the indie label Rough Trade Records and by Megadisc in the Netherlands. The second album, Shovel, received the greatest critical acclaim. The last of these four albums, Suction, was produced by Butch Vig. Johnson told Steve Gardner of Noise for Heroes that "'[the group] understands itself... we're not pushing a hype, we're not pushing a style, we're not pushing glamor, we're not pushing twinkly dinkly bloody little star how I wonder how sweet you are sort of shit.' Rick and Al have never played in a band other than feedtime."

Feedtime's sound is heavily referenced rural American country and blues. A large influence from classic rock is most easily heard on their covers LP Cooper S on which they covered the Rolling Stones and the Animals in addition to punk forebears like the Ramones and the Stooges.

Bruce Griffiths of Aberrant Records said of his interaction with the group, "the most satisfying was feedtime, because they became extremely close friends as a result of working with them, and I guess part of the satisfaction with them was the fact that they achieved recognition; they were licensed to Rough Trade in America, they're now licensed to Vinyl Solution in England and Europe, to Megadisc in the Benelux countries in Europe, so I guess that was satisfying in the way things happened, and a lot of people as a result of my involvement and us working together came to appreciate this band that I thought was really special."

== Reunions ==
Feedtime reunited in 1995 with Johnson and Larkin joined by the latter's younger brother, John Larkin on drums. In April 1996 the trio released their fifth studio album, Billy via Black Hole Records in Australia and Amphetamine Reptile in the US. They supported US group, Unsane for a tour of the Australian east coast, followed in April 1997 with an Australian support slot for UK group, the Damned, alongside fellow Sydney-siders, X.

The mid-1980s line-up of Johnson, Larkin and Sturm reunited in 2011 for two shows in Sydney and one in San Francisco, for the tenth anniversary of S.S. Records, followed by a US tour the following year, in conjunction with Sub Pop's reissue of their first four albums as the compilation, The Aberrant Years. On 3 April 2012, they performed their first ever in-studio live radio performance on WFMU, a community radio station in New Jersey.

In October 2015, the reunited Johnson-Larkin-Sturm line-up recorded their sixth studio album, gas, with Mikey Young of Total Control. The album was released on In the Red Records in March 2017.

== Band name and logo ==
The band chose the name 'feedtime' "because it had no obvious association with tough, fast, or punk, and it had no other associations or meanings". When asked why they spell it with a lowercase 'f', they said: "Looks better."

The feedtime logo is a cartoon frog, created by Al, who based the design on a woodcut by Matsumoto Hoji. It has been described as deliberately meaningless and "anti-punk". In the music video for "Melody Line", the band recreates the logo using motorcycle parts.

== Legacy ==
Despite limited impact at home, Feedtime exerted influence in the United States, particularly in the Pacific Northwest, and is recognised as having "presaged or even helped create grunge". Many bands in Seattle discovered Feedtime through the college radio station KCMU, where DJs and Feedtime fans Bruce Pavitt and Jonathan Poneman joined to launch the Sub Pop record label. Mark Arm and Steve Turner, assistant DJs at KCMU and founders of the pioneering Seattle grunge band Mudhoney, cite Feedtime, alongside fellow Australian band The Scientists, as one of their main musical influences. Describing Feedtime's sound, Arm said: "I liked the reduction—the sonic reduction that was only promised with The Dead Boys, but this was the real deal". Feedtime's use of slide inspired Arm to use the technique on songs such as "Touch Me I'm Sick", and "the delay on the vocals and maybe even the slide guitar" on "Sweet Young Thing Ain't Sweet No More" was modelled on Feedtime's "Curtains". Nirvana's frontman, Kurt Cobain, was also a fan of Feedtime. In 2012, Al stated that they were unaware of any interest overseas: "the band were a bit socially dysfunctional, not really tuned into the world. [Laughs] ... it's great to think that feedtime might have had some role to play in the work of those US musicians".

The title track of the band's 1996 album Billy is featured in the 2010 book 1001 Songs You Must Hear Before You Die: And 10,001 You Must Download.

== Reissues ==
During a 2008 interview on Triple J, Sub Pop co-founder Jonathan Poneman listed Feedtime's Shovel among the five albums he wish he'd released. This prompted Bruce Griffiths of Aberrant Records to offer Sub Pop the chance to reissue Feedtime's albums. In 2012, Sub Pop released The Aberrant Years, a 4-CD/LP reissue of the first four Feedtime full-length records.

== Discography ==
Studio albums

- feedtime (1985, Self-released)
- Shovel (1986, Aberrant)
- Cooper-S (1988, Aberrant)
- Suction (1989, Aberrant)
- Billy (1996, Amphetamine Reptile)
- Gas (2017, In The Red)

Singles

- Fractured/Safari/Rumble (1986, Aberrant)
- Don't Tell Me/Small Talk (1987, Aberrant)
- Buffalo Bob/More Than Love (split single with King Snake Roost) (1988, Aberrant)
- Weekend Warrior/No Soul (split single with Unsane) (1996, Black Hole)
- flatiron/stick up jack (2015, Sub Pop)

Compilations

- Suction/Cooper-S (1989, Megadisc)
- feedtime + suction (1989, Rough Trade)
- The Aberrant Years (2012, Sub Pop)
- Today Is Friday (2012, S-S Records)

Appears on

- Why March When You Can Riot?! LP (Aberrant Records, 1985): "Don't Tell Me"/"Small Talk"
- Trousers In Action EP double 7" (Aberrant Records, ACT-13/MX211861, 1986, with Trousers In Action fanzine No. 13): "Plymouth Car is a Limousine"
- Away From The Pulsebeat No. 2 7" (Red Records, AFTP 002/TR-520845-7, 1988; with Away From The Pulsebeat fanzine No. 2): "Take the Buick"
- Bucketfull of Brains "Freebie Compilation" Flexi 7" (Bucketfull of Brains, 1988; flexi with Bucketfull of Brains fanzine): "Trouble"
- Hard To Beat double LP (Au-Go-Go ANDA 70, 1988): "Ann"
- Howl! No. 5 7" (Howl! Magazine, HOWL!-5, 1989): "Don't Tell Me"
- Scumbait No. 2 7" (Treehouse Records, 1990, TR 023; yellow or black vinyl): "Plymouth Car is a Limousine"
- Amrep Equipped Sampler CD (Amphetamine Reptile, 1997, AMREP-097): "Billy"
