= Home Is a Strange Place =

Studio album by Paw
- Released: August 22, 2000
- Genre: Grunge, hard rock
- Length: 28:30
- Label: E1 Entertainment
- Producer: Grant Fitch

Paw chronology
Death to Traitors (1995)	Home Is a Strange Place (2000)

Professional ratings
Review scores
Source	Rating
AllMusic	3/5 stars

Home Is a Strange Place is the third and final album by the American grunge band Paw. It was released on August 22, 2000, through Koch International.

The majority of the album was recorded prior to 2000. During recording, the lineup consisted of founding members vocalist Mark Hennessy, drummer Peter Fitch, and guitarist Grant Fitch, along with bassist Dan Hines. By the time Paw signed a label deal with Koch, the lineup had shifted as Jason Magierowski replaced Hines on bass (Magierowski was previously in the band from 1995 to 1996) and Kyle Hudson replaced Peter Fitch on drums.

Koch had outlined plans for the band, such as releasing promotional singles for Home Is a Strange Place and drawing up plans for a nationwide tour. Ultimately, Paw did not receive support after the album's release; thus, they disbanded shortly after.

== Track listing ==
1. "Ruby Red" – 1:27
2. "One Handed in the Red Room" – 4:02
3. "Blow Wind" – 4:08
4. "Into the Woods" (G. Fitch) – 4:30
5. "Naiad" (G. Fitch) – 5:35
6. "Home Is a Strange Place" – 5:49
7. "Oily Rags" (G. Fitch) – 2:56

All songs were written by Mark Hennessy and Grant Fitch, except where noted.

== Personnel ==
- Mark Hennessy – vocals
- Grant Fitch – guitars, vocals
- Peter Fitch – drums, percussion
- J. Hall – drums (track 4)
- Steve Henry – lead guitar (tracks 5 and 6)
- Dan Hines – bass
- Jason Magierowski – bass (track 4)
