= Dragline (album) =

Studio album by Paw
- Released: 1993
- Recorded: September–December 1992
- Studios: Smart, Madison, Wisconsin
- Genre: Grunge
- Length: 50:18 (1:08:13 in the re-release)
- Label: A&M
- Producers: Mr. Colson; Paw

Paw chronology
Dragline (1993)	Death to Traitors (1995)

Singles from Dragline
- 1. "Jessie" Released: 1993; 2. "Couldn't Know" Released: 1993; 3. "Sleeping Bag" Released: 1993

Dragline is the debut studio album by the American grunge band Paw. It was released in 1993 through A&M Records. It sold around 80,000 copies.

The single "Jessie", released in 1993, reached number 82 in the UK. Other singles from the album included "Sleeping Bag" and "Couldn't Know" in 1993.

In 2015, the album was re-released by Cherry Red Records Ltd. with all the b-sides from the singles as bonus tracks as well as extensive liner notes and slightly different artwork (the band logo and the title are smaller).

== Production ==
Produced by Mr. Colson and the band, the album was recorded at Smart Studios, in Madison, Wisconsin.

== Critical reception ==
Professional ratings
Review scores
Source	Rating
AllMusic	4/5 stars
Calgary Herald	C
Classic Rock	3.5/5 stars
Collector's Guide to Heavy Metal	10/10
The Encyclopedia of Popular Music	4/5 stars
Entertainment Weekly	B
Los Angeles Times	3/4 stars
MusicHound Rock	3/5 stars
Vox	6/10

The Morning Call wrote that "the approach is elemental and effective: a rhythm pounces, and a metallic guitar groove drills holes before surrendering to softly ringing accents or gently strummed acoustics as [Mark] Hennessy sings about death and suffering in a throaty roar." The Los Angeles Times deemed the album "country-grunge," writing: "It would take a major revolution to get country radio to play this—there's way too much wattage in the amps. But there is also plenty of Middle American sensibility, giving this debut a character all its own." The Calgary Herald said that the album "mixes melodic guitar with in-yer-face speed metal, kind-of a Pursuit of Happiness meets Metallica."

Trouser Press wrote that "much of the quartet’s sonic heft emanates from the formidable drum-pounding of Peter Fitch, whose brother Grant hammers out echo-drenched guitar riffs that revisit a limited number of arena-rock clichés with alarming frequency." The New York Times wrote that "Hennessy's conviction, and his ability to distill situations into terse, allusive lyrics, make him a rival of Pearl Jam's Eddie Vedder." The New Yorker called the album "equal parts metallic vigor and Southern-rock grit."

Rolling Stone listed Dragline at No. 35 on its list of the "50 Greatest Grunge Albums." In 2007, Martin Popoff named the album the 15th greatest heavy metal album of the 1990s.

== Track listing ==
All songs were written by Mark Hennessy and Grant Fitch, except where noted.

No.	Title	Length
1.	"Gasoline" (M. Hennessy, G. Fitch, P. Fitch)	4:47
2.	"Sleeping Bag"	4:07
3.	"Jessie" (M. Hennessy, G. Fitch, P. Fitch)	3:14
4.	"The Bridge"	3:34
5.	"Couldn't Know"	4:12
6.	"Pansy" (M. Hennessy, G. Fitch, P. Fitch)	3:26
7.	"Lolita"	4:56
8.	"Dragline"	5:07
9.	"Veronica"	3:58
10.	"One More Bottle"	4:04
11.	"Sugarcane"	3:46
12.	"Hard Pig"	5:07
13.	"Suicide Shift" (Re-release bonus track)	3:06
14.	"Slow Burn" (Re-release bonus track)	2:18
15.	"I Know Where You Sleep" (Re-release bonus track)	4:37
16.	"Jessie" (Re-release bonus track (Live acoustic in Boston, Nov 29))	3:16
17.	"Imaginary Lover" (Re-release bonus track (Atlanta Rhythm Section cover))	4:37
Total length:		01:08:13

== Personnel ==
- Mark Hennessy – vocals
- Charles Bryan – bass
- Grant Fitch – guitar
- Peter Fitch – drums
