= King Snake Roost =

Australian noise rock band

Background information
- Origin: Adelaide, Australia
- Genres: Grunge, noise rock
- Years active: 1985–1990
- Labels: Aberrant; Amphetamine Reptile; Satellite; Megadisc; Normal
- Past members: Charles Tolnay; Peter Hill; David Quinn; Bill Bostle; Michael Raymond; Craig Rossi; Gene Rivet; Trigger

King Snake Roost (also known as KSR) were an Australian noise rock band. King Snake Roost formed in 1985 in Adelaide and in 1987 the band moved to Sydney. The band broke up in 1990 after a two-month tour of the US. In Australia and the USA the band played with some of the most influential noise rock bands of the 1980s, including Sonic Youth, Big Black, Mudhoney, Helmet, Babes In Toyland, Lubricated Goat, feedtime and The Mark of Cain. KSR played at some prestigious 1980s US venues, including, CBGB and Maxwell's.

The band released its second album in 1989, titled Things That Play Themselves.

== Lineup ==
=== 1985-1986 ===
- Charlie Tolnay, guitar
  - was also a founding member of the seminal Adelaide post punk band Grong Grong
  - for a brief time he was in blues-punk band Bloodloss with Guy Maddison of Mudhoney and he recorded with Lubricated Goat
  - during 1989 he recorded the Tumor Circus album with members of Steel Pole Bathtub and Jello Biafra of the Dead Kennedys
  - also played on both Bushpig records with Steve Turner and Mark Arm of Mudhoney
- Trigger (Steve Tregilgas), vocals.
- Michael Raymond, bass.
- George Klestines, drums, formerly of Grong Grong and Perdition.

=== 1986-1987 ===
- Charlie Tolnay, guitar
- Peter Hill, vocals & feed harp, also a member of Bushpig
- Bill Bostle, drums, was also a member of Half.
- Michael Raymond, bass.
  - It was this line up that recorded the first KSR release From Barbarism to Christian Manhood. For a brief time after Michael Raymond left bass duties were handled by 'Uncle Egon' (the band's name for the pre-recorded bass parts played back off tape), most notably for the Adelaide University Union show with Big Black. Dave Taskas of Grong Grong also played bass at a small number of shows in Melbourne.

=== 1987-1989 ===
- Charlie Tolnay, guitar.
- Peter Hill, vocals, guitar, feed harp.
- Bill Bostle, drums.
- David Quinn, bass, also a member of Deathless, and previously of Madroom.
  - This lineup was responsible for all subsequent King Snake Roost recordings, and the US tour.

=== 1989-1990 ===
- Charlie Tolnay, guitar
- Peter Hill, vocals
- Gene Rivet, bass
- Craig Rossi, drums, who also played in Box Of Fish.
  - This version of the band was short-lived.

=== Guests ===
- Lachlan McLeod, a member of Salamander Jim and Thug, amongst others.
- Dave Boyne, member of legendary 1960s garage band The Missing Links.
- Adrian Symes, aka 'Sax Adrian', who played with many bands during the 1980s.
- Tom Sturm, of feedtime.
- Michael Farkas, singer from Grong Grong.

== Discography ==
Studio albums

- From Barbarism to Christian Manhood (1987, Aberrant)
- Things That Play Themselves (1988, Aberrant)
- Ground Into the Dirt (1990, Amphetamine Reptile)

Singles

- Raw Cuts (1987, Satellite)
- Top End Killer/A Storm Brewin' (1988, Aberrant)
- Buffalo Bob/More Than Love (split single with feedtime) (1988, Aberrant)
- School's Out/Nutbush City Limits (split single with Bloodloss) (1989, Crack)

Appears on

- Hard to Believe: Kiss Covers Compilation (1989, Waterfront)
- Dope-Guns-'n-Fucking in the Streets: Volume 3 (1989, Amphetamine Reptile)
- Dope-Guns-'n-Fucking in the Streets: Volumes 1–3 (1990, Amphetamine Reptile)
- Dope Guns & F*cking Up Your Video Deck: Volume One (1990, Amphetamine Reptile)
