= Past Worn Searching =

Studio album by Rainer Maria
- Released: November 1, 1997
- Studio: Ghetto Love Recording
- Genre: Emo ˑ Indie rock
- Length: 36:04
- Label: Polyvinyl
- Producers: Dale Meiners, Rainer Maria

Rainer Maria chronology
Rainer Maria (1996)	Past Worn Searching (1997)	Look Now Look Again (1999)

Professional ratings
Review scores
Source	Rating
AllMusic	1.5/5 stars

Past Worn Searching is the debut studio album by American indie rock band Rainer Maria, released in 1997.

== Critical reception ==
The Wisconsin State Journal thought that "plaintive ballads like 'Viva Anger, Viva Hate' and 'Sickbed' are impressively moody, opening with soothing sounds before building to shattering crescendos."

In 2006, The New York Times wrote that the album "captures the slightly chaotic sound of a band that was willfully out of place: the trio was often the wimpiest act at Midwestern punk and hardcore concerts."

== Track listing ==
All songs by Rainer Maria.

1. "Tinfoil" – 4:55
2. "Half Past April" – 4:22
3. "Viva Anger, Viva Hate" – 3:12
4. "Always More Often" – 5:33
5. "Sickbed" – 5:49
6. "Never In Anger" – 4:58
7. "New York, 1955" – 4:18
8. "Homeopathy" – 4:41
9. "Put Me to Sleep" – 4:00
