= Look Now Look Again =

Studio album by Rainer Maria
- Released: April 20, 1999
- Recorded: December 1998
- Genre: Midwest emo
- Length: 34:17
- Label: Polyvinyl
- Producer: Mark Haines

Rainer Maria chronology
| Past Worn Searching (1997) | Look Now Look Again (1999) | A Better Version of Me (2001) |

Professional ratings
Review scores
| Source | Rating |
|---|---|
| AllMusic | 4/5 stars |
| Pitchfork | 8.8/10 (1999); 8.3/10 (2018) |
| Spin | 8/10 |

Look Now Look Again is the second studio album by American indie rock band Rainer Maria. It is now regarded as an influential classic of second-wave emo.

== Critical reception and legacy ==
In recent years, Look's critical standing has remained positive. In a review of its 2018 reissue, Pitchfork's Jenn Pelly deemed it one of second-wave emo's greatest albums, calling it "a undeniable classic of a time when [the genre] broadcasted an ethic of intelligence." She saw the album pave the musical groundwork for future bands like Rilo Kiley, Paramore, and Camp Cope. In 2020, Kerrang! included Look on their list of emo's 20 best albums released before the 2000s. The site's Ryan De Freitas dubbed it "a bona fide classic of the genre".

In a 2019 Noisey list, Matt Lunsford, the co-founder of Look's record label Polyvinyl, placed it tenth out of what he believed the label's 10 most important releases. The following year, Stereogum's Ian Cohen referred to Look as one Polyvinyl's "formative documents" of Midwest emo alongside Braid's Frame & Canvas and American Football's self-titled debut.

== Track listing ==
All songs by Rainer Maria.

1. "Rise" – 4:18
2. "Planetary" – 5:21
3. "Broken Radio" – 3:11
4. "Feeling Neglected?" – 4:43
5. "Breakfast of Champions" – 3:37
6. "The Reason The Night Is Long" – 3:48
7. "Lost, Dropped and Cancelled" – 2:45
8. "Centrifuge" – 3:37
9. "I'm Melting!" – 3:14

== Personnel ==
- Caithlin De Marrais – bass/vocals
- Kaia Fischer – guitar/vocals
- William Kuehn – drums
- Mark Haines – producer, engineer
- Elliot Dicks – producer
- John Golden – mastering
