= S/T (Rainer Maria album) =

Studio album by Rainer Maria
- Released: August 18, 2017
- Length: 36:11
- Label: Polyvinyl

Professional ratings
Aggregate scores
| Source | Rating |
|---|---|
| Metacritic | 80/100 |
Review scores
| Source | Rating |
| AllMusic | 4/5 stars |
| Exclaim! | 8/10 |
| Paste | 8/10 |
| Pitchfork | 7.6/10 |

S/T is the sixth studio album by American band Rainer Maria. It was released on August 18, 2017, under Polyvinyl Record Co.

== Track listing ==
| No. | Title | Length |
|---|---|---|
| 1. | "Broke Open Love" | 4:38 |
| 2. | "Suicides and Lazy Eyes" | 3:38 |
| 3. | "Lower Worlds" | 3:50 |
| 4. | "Forest Mattress" | 4:31 |
| 5. | "Blackbird" | 3:20 |
| 6. | "Possession" | 2:55 |
| 7. | "Ornaments of Empty" | 5:21 |
| 8. | "Communicator" | 3:16 |
| 9. | "Hellebore" | 4:42 |
