= Suction (album) =

Studio album by feedtime
- Released: 1989
- Genre: Noise rock
- Length: 36:32
- Label: Rough Trade
- Producer: Butch Vig

Feedtime chronology
Cooper-S (1988)	Suction (1989)	Billy (1996)

Professional ratings
Review scores
Source	Rating
Allmusic	4/5 stars

Suction is the fourth studio album by noise rock band Feedtime, released in 1989 by Rough Trade Records.

== Track listing ==
All tracks are written by feedtime

Side one
No.	Title	Length
1.	"Motorbike Girl"	2:28
2.	"Possum"	2:59
3.	"Drag Your Dog"	2:05
4.	"Ever Again"	3:07
5.	"Highway"	2:23
6.	"Confused Blues"	4:23

Side two
No.	Title	Length
1.	"I'll Be Rested"	3:01
2.	"Pumping a Line"	3:22
3.	"Meter"	2:06
4.	"Social Suction"	2:11
5.	"Trouble"	2:13
6.	"Valve Frank"	2:20
7.	"Arse"	3:53

== Personnel ==
Adapted from the Suction liner notes.

feedtime

- Rick Johnson – vocals, guitar
- Al Larkin – bass guitar
- Tom Sturm – drums

Production

- Dave Boyne – engineering
- Butch Vig – production, mixing

== Release history ==
Region	Date	Label	Format	Catalog
United States	1989	Rough Trade	CS, LP	RoughUS65
Australia	1989	Aberrant	LP	never1again
