= A Better Version of Me =

Studio album by Rainer Maria
- Released: January 23, 2001
- Recorded: September 1, 2000 – September 14, 2000
- Genre: Indie rock
- Label: Polyvinyl
- Producer: Mark Haines

Rainer Maria chronology
Look Now Look Again (1999)	A Better Version of Me (2001)	Long Knives Drawn (2003)

A Better Version of Me is the third studio album by American indie rock band Rainer Maria.

== Reception ==
Professional ratings
Aggregate scores
Source	Rating
Metacritic	61/100
Review scores
Source	Rating
AllMusic	3/5 stars
Entertainment Weekly	B+
PopMatters	–

"Matured vocal power and solid song structure have replaced the cacophonous ways of their youth." - PopMatters
"Caithlin De Marrais' graceful, yet abrasive vocals craft the dynamic of the band..." - AllMusic

== Track listing ==
All tracks are written by Rainer Maria.

No.	Title	Length
1.	"Artificial Light"	3:40
2.	"Thought I Was"	3:16
3.	"Ceremony"	4:20
4.	"The Seven Sisters"	6:11
5.	"Save My Skin"	5:12
6.	"The Contents of Lincoln's Pockets"	4:19
7.	"Atropine"	6:34
8.	"Spit and Fire"	4:28
9.	"Hell and High Water"	3:45

== Personnel ==
- Caithlin De Marrais – group member
- Kaia Fischer – group member
- William Kuehn – group member
- Elliot Dicks – assistant engineer, mixing, assistant producer, assistant
- Mark Haines – producer, engineer, mixing
- Lesley Vance – cover painting
- Mark Owens – artwork, design
- Matt Owens – design
