= Rainer Maria =

American emo band

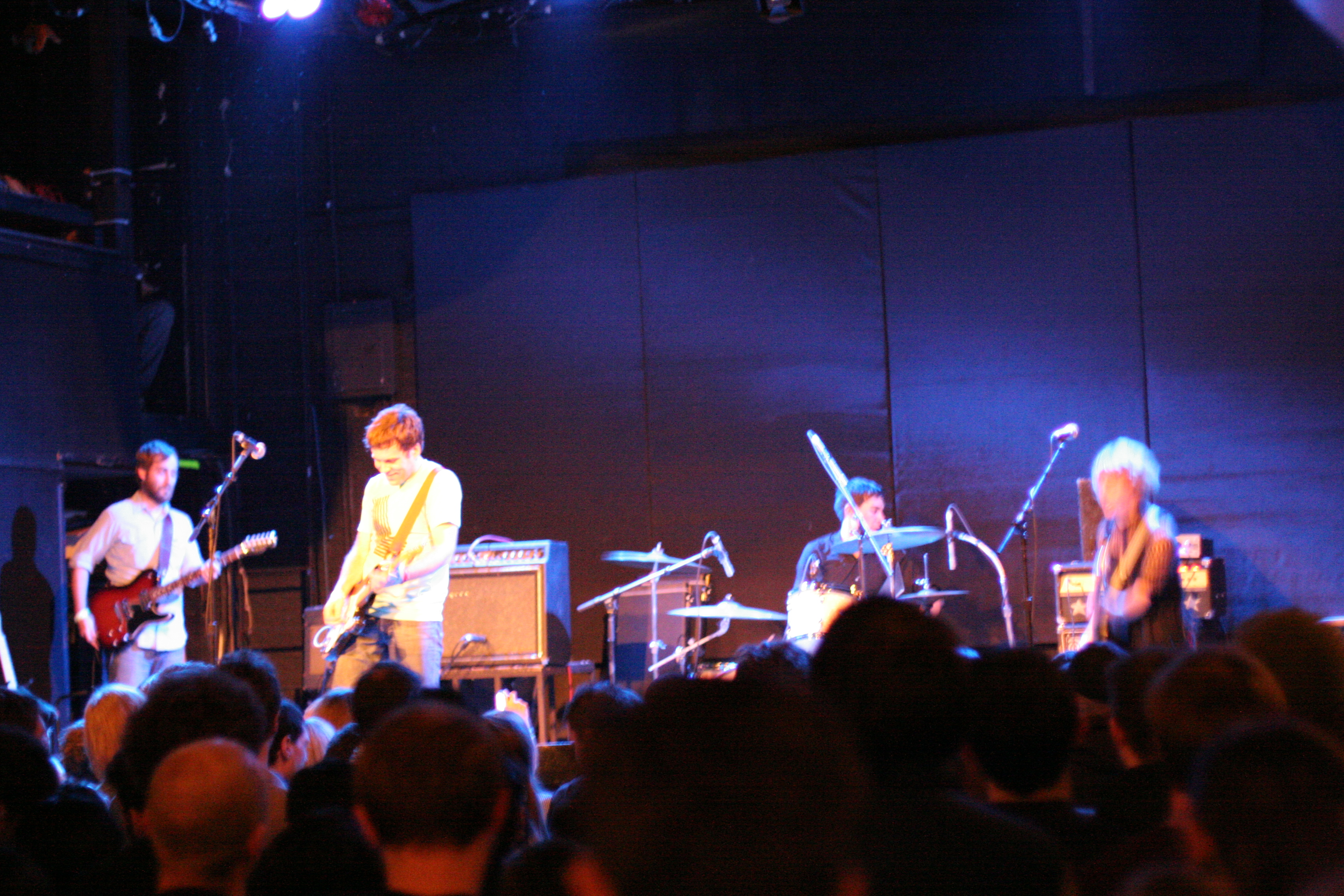
- Rainer Maria performing in 2006

Background information
- Origin: Madison, Wisconsin, U.S.
- Genres: Indie rock; emo
- Works: Rainer Maria discography
- Years active: 1995–2006, 2014-present
- Labels: Polyvinyl; Grunion
- Members: Caithlin De Marrais; Kaia Fischer; William Kuehn

Rainer Maria is an American emo band from Madison, Wisconsin, later residing in Brooklyn, New York. The band was originally active from 1995 to 2006 and reunited in 2014. They have released six full-length albums, a live DVD, and numerous live recordings and EPs.

== History ==
Caithlin De Marrais, Kaia Fischer and William Kuehn formed the band in late summer of 1995 and named it after the German-language poet Rainer Maria Rilke. In its earlier days, the band had a dual male and female vocal line-up; later, De Marrais would become the lead vocalist in a majority of their songs. The gender ambiguity of the name Rainer Maria paralleled this and was one of the reasons it was selected as the band's name.

The band's many tours and intimate live shows at venues such as Brooklyn's North Six (which lead singer Caithlin De Marrais referred to as "home" during her final show because it also served as the band's rehearsal space), Washington, D.C.'s Black Cat, the Bowery Ballroom in NYC, and Chapel Hill's Cat's Cradle helped to grow its fan base and fuel album sales.

On November 6, 2006, the band announced, through Pitchfork Media, that the December 16th show at New York City's Bowery Ballroom would be their last. It was accompanied by this statement:

"We are grateful to our new listeners and especially our longtime fans for their endless support and attention. We feel incredibly fortunate to have come up during a unique time in rock music, in a community that grew with us from the Midwest to Brooklyn and beyond. Making records has always been a revelation, and walking onto stage together we found a vision we could share.

"For us, this transition can be nothing short of heartbreaking. But for reasons both musical and personal, the three of us have chosen this time to move on."

The band played their last show on December 17, 2006, at North Six in Brooklyn. They opened with "Artificial Light" and closed with a lengthy version of "Rise." Referring to the intensity of the show and the enthusiasm of the crowd, Fischer at one point remarked jokingly in-between songs "we should break up every night."

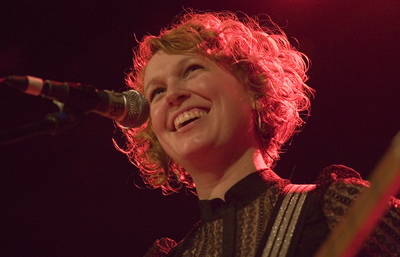
Caithlin De Marrais performing in 2006

=== Reunion ===
The band played a reunion show at the Bowery Ballroom in Manhattan on December 31, 2014; additional shows were added for February 14, 2015, at Lincoln Hall in Chicago, April 18, 2015, at Union Transfer in Philadelphia, and July 10–11, 2015, in Brooklyn.

They played again in Brooklyn on December 31, 2016, and January 1, 2017. In June, the group released "Lower Worlds", their first song since disbanding, and announced that S/T, their first album in 11 years, would be released on August 18, 2017.

On February 29, 2024, the band announced via their Instagram that they would be playing at the Best Friends Forever festival in Las Vegas, marking their first show in 6 years.

== Band members ==
- Caithlin De Marrais - bass, vocals
- Kaia Fischer - guitar, vocals, synths
- William Kuehn - drums, percussion

== Discography ==
- Past Worn Searching (1997, Polyvinyl)
- Look Now Look Again (1999, Polyvinyl)
- A Better Version of Me (2001, Polyvinyl)
- Long Knives Drawn (2003, Polyvinyl)
- Catastrophe Keeps Us Together (2006, Grunion)
- S/T (2017, Polyvinyl)
