= Long Knives Drawn =

Studio album by Rainer Maria
- Released: January 21, 2003
- Recorded: August – September 2002
- Genre: Indie rock
- Label: Polyvinyl
- Producer: Mark Haines

Rainer Maria chronology
A Better Version of Me (2001)	Long Knives Drawn (2003)	Anyone in Love With You (Already Knows) (2004)

Professional ratings
Review scores
Source	Rating
AllMusic	link
Rolling Stone	(not rated) link
PopMatters	(not rated) link
Blender	link

Long Knives Drawn is the fourth studio album by American indie rock band Rainer Maria.

== Track listing ==
All tracks composed by Caithlin DeMarrais, Kyle Fischer and William Kuehn.

1. "Mystery and Misery" – 4:43
2. "Long Knives" – 3:08
3. "Ears Ring" – 3:43
4. "The Double Life" – 3:29
5. "The Awful Truth of Loving" – 4:57
6. "The Imperatives" – 4:29
7. "Floors" – 4:13
8. "CT Catholic" – 3:51
9. "Situation, Relation" – 2:51

== Personnel ==
- Caithlin De Marrais – bass, vocals
- Kaia Fischer – guitar, vocals
- William Kuehn – drums
- Mark Haines – producer, engineer, mixing
- Mark Owens – design
- Matt Owens – design
- Rainer Maria – design
- Danielle Saint Laurent – photography
