= Shirley Manson discography =

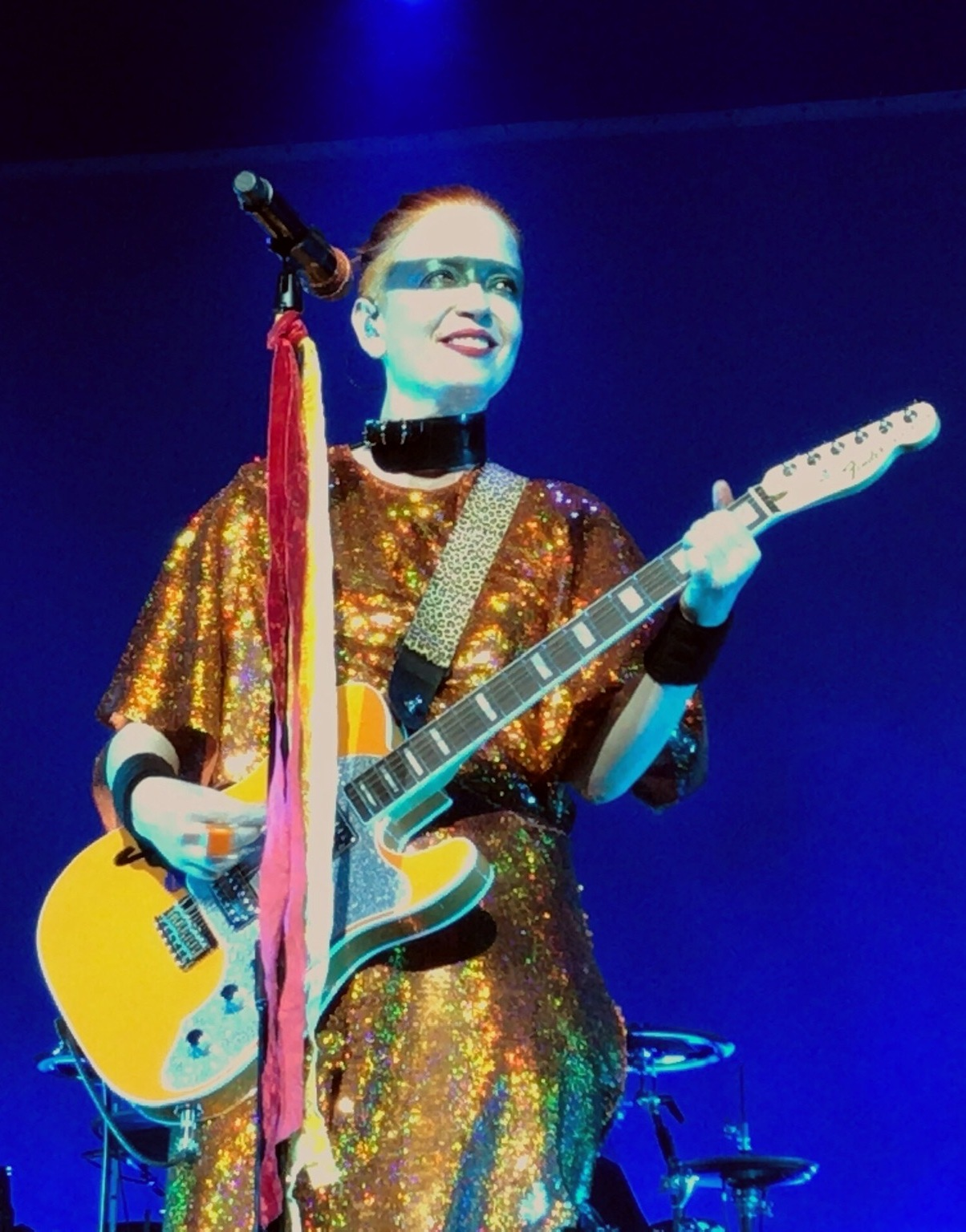
- Shirley Manson performing live with Garbage in 2018
- Studio albums: 12
- Extended plays: 1
- Singles: 49
- Video albums: 2
- Music videos: 47

This is a list of the discography of Scottish recording artist Shirley Manson, who has performed as the lead singer of American rock band Garbage since 1993. Prior to joining Garbage, she was a backing vocalist and keyboard player for Goodbye Mr Mackenzie from 1981–1992. The band had one UK Top 40 single, "The Rattler", and a string of UK Top 100 singles – "Goodbye Mr. Mackenzie", "Love Child", "Blacker Than Black" and "Now We Are Married".

Following moderate UK success with Goodbye Mr Mackenzie, Manson was then signed as a solo artist, performing under the name Angelfish, with some members of Goodbye Mr Mackenzie, releasing Angelfish in the early 1990s. The music video for "Suffocate Me" received airplay on MTV's 120 Minutes and was watched by Steve Marker of Garbage. Impressed, he told fellow Garbage members Butch Vig and Duke Erikson, and the band invited Manson to Wisconsin to provide vocals for what would become their international breakthrough debut album, Garbage, released in 1995. Garbage have since sold 17 million records worldwide, and have since released a further six studio albums – Version 2.0 (1998), Beautiful Garbage (2001), Bleed Like Me (2005), Not Your Kind of People (2012), Strange Little Birds (2016) and No Gods No Masters (2021).

A few months into Garbage's hiatus, Manson began writing a solo record, working with musician Paul Buchanan, producer Greg Kurstin, and film composer David Arnold. In 2007, Manson collaborated with Rivers Cuomo of Weezer, who at that point had never co-written material with anyone. Manson presented some of her work to Geffen Records in 2008, who found it "too noir", prompting Manson and Geffen to mutually terminate her contract. Manson continued to write material while without a record deal and was in talks with David Byrne and Ray Davies about a potential collaboration. Manson posted three demos on her Facebook profile, written by her and Kurstin, titled "In the Snow", "Pretty Horses" and "Lighten Up".

"I had taken some of my solo music into the record label. They didn't really care for the direction I was moving in and I found it really disheartening. They wanted a pop hit, which I understand in terms of making money. I get that. But what they were going to ask of me was something I wasn't prepared to deliver and I felt kind of trapped. I just stopped writing. I just stopped. It was stifling."

— Shirley Manson

Manson also worked with a number of artists outside of her solo project, reciting a verse of a long poem for a Chris Connelly album, co-writing and recording a duet with Eric Avery for his solo debut, recording with Debbie Harry and performing backing vocals on a Gavin Rossdale track. Although not recording material with them, Manson also performed on-stage with The Pretenders, Iggy Pop, Incubus and Kings of Leon in Atlantic City, with Gwen Stefani and a further twice with No Doubt in Universal City. Manson also performed in an uncredited role as a dominatrix in the music video for She Wants Revenge's single "These Things".

== Albums ==
=== Studio albums ===
Below is a complete list of the studio albums, compilation albums, remix and special release albums released by Manson as a member of the bands she has been lead singer – Goodbye Mr Mackenzie, Angelfish and Garbage.

List of studio albums, with selected chart positions, sales figures and certifications
Title	Details	Peak chart positions										Certifications	Sales
Title	Details	US	AUS	AUT	CAN	FRA	GER	NZ	SWE	SWI	UK	Certifications	Sales
Good Deeds and Dirty Rags	Released: 10 April 1989; Label: Capitol; Formats: LP, cassette, digital download	—	—	—	—	—	—	—	—	—	26		
Hammer and Tongs	Released: 4 March 1991; Label: Radioactive Records, MCA; Formats: CD, LP, cassette, digital download	—	—	—	—	—	—	—	—	—	51		
Five	Released: 1994; Label: Blokshok Records; Formats: CD, LP, cassette, digital download	—	—	—	—	—	—	—	—	—	—		
Angelfish	Released: 15 February 1994; Label: Radioactive, MCA; Formats: CD, LP, cassette, digital download	196	—	—	—	—	—	—	—	—	—		US: 10,000
Garbage	Released: August 15, 1995; Label: Almo; Formats: CD, LP, cassette, digital download	20	4	—	15	16	55	1	19	—	6	RIAA: 2× Platinum; ARIA: 2× Platinum; BPI: 2× Platinum; MC: 2× Platinum; RMNZ: 2× Platinum; SNEP: Gold	World: 4,000,000; US: 2,400,000; GER: 230,000; UK: 701,757
Version 2.0	Released: May 11, 1998; Label: Almo; Formats: CD, LP, cassette, digital download	13	5	4	2	1	4	1	12	17	1	RIAA: Platinum; ARIA: Platinum; BPI: 2× Platinum; MC: Platinum; IFPI: Platinum; IFPI SWE: Gold; RMNZ: Platinum; SNEP: 2× Gold	World: 4,000,000; US: 1,700,000; UK: 579,912
Beautiful Garbage	Released: October 1, 2001; Label: Almo, Interscope; Formats: CD, LP, cassette, MiniDisc, digital download	13	1	9	6	3	6	2	29	10	6	ARIA: 2× Platinum; BPI: Gold; MC: Gold; RMNZ: Gold	US: 405,000; UK: 121,397
Bleed Like Me	Released: April 11, 2005; Label: Almo, Geffen; Formats: CD, cassette, digital download	4	4	17	9	6	12	25	7	15	4	ARIA: Gold; BPI: Silver	US: 284,000; UK: 84,339
Not Your Kind of People	Released: May 14, 2012; Label: Stunvolume; Formats: CD, LP, digital download	13	8	39	17	15	15	32	—	15	10		US: 98,000
Strange Little Birds	Released: June 10, 2016; Label: Stunvolume; Formats: CD, LP, digital download	14	9	17	69	23	22	18	—	16	17		US: 20,000
No Gods No Masters	Released: June 11, 2021; Label: Stunvolume / Infectious Music; Formats: CD, LP, digital download	33	5	13	—	40	6	34	—	13	5		
Let All That We Imagine Be the Light	Released: May 30, 2025; Label: Stunvolume / BMG; Formats: CD, LP, digital download	— (Note: Let All That We Imagine Be the Light did not enter the Billboard 200, but peaked at number 8 on the Top Album Sales chart.)	87	10	—	104	17	—	—	24	24		
"—" denotes a recording that did not chart or was not released in that territory.

==== Compilation albums ====
List of compilation albums, with selected chart positions and sales figures
Title	Details	Peak chart positions										Sales	Certifications
Title	Details	US	AUS	BEL	CAN	GER	IRE	ITA	SPA	SWI	UK	Sales	Certifications
Absolute Garbage	Released: July 23, 2007; Label: Almo, Geffen, UM^{e}; Formats: CD, digital download	68	18	28	43	68	22	79	59	77	11	US: 66,000	BPI: Silver
The Absolute Collection	Released: November 2, 2012; Label: Liberation Music; Formats: CD, digital download	—	88	—	—	—	—	—	—	—	—		
Anthology	Released: October 28, 2022; Label: Stunvolume / BMG; Formats: 2CDs, 2LPs, digital download	—	—	110	—	54	—	—	49	—	99		
"—" denotes a recording that did not chart or was not released in that territory.

==== Remix albums ====
Title	Details
Version 2.0: The Official Remixes	Released: July 6, 2018; Label: Almo, Interscope; Format: Digital download

==== Extended plays ====
Title	Details
Special Collection	Released: February 6, 2002; Label: Sony Music Japan; Format: CD

== Singles ==
A chronological list of all singles released by the bands in which Manson features as the lead or guest vocalist.

List of singles, with selected chart positions and certifications, showing year released and album name
Title	Year	Peak chart positions										Certifications	Album
Title	Year	US	US Alt	AUS	CAN	GER	IRE	NL	NZ	SWI	UK	Certifications	Album
"Death of a Salesman"	1984	—	—	—	—	—	—	—	—	—	—		Split-single w/ Lindy Bergman
"The Rattler"	1986	—	—	—	—	—	—	—	—	—	— (Note: "The Ratler" did not enter the UK Singles Charts, but peaked at number 8 on the UK Indie Singles Charts.)		Single only
"Face to Face"	1987	—	—	—	—	—	—	—	—	—	— (Note: "Face to Face" did not enter the UK Singles Charts, but peaked at number 27 on the UK Indie Singles chart.)		Single only
"Goodbye Mr. Mackenzie"	1988	—	—	—	—	—	—	—	—	—	62		Good Deeds and Dirty Rags
"Open Your Arms"	1988	—	—	—	—	—	—	—	—	—	92		Good Deeds and Dirty Rags
"The Rattler" (re-release)	1989	—	—	—	—	—	—	—	—	—	37		Good Deeds and Dirty Rags
"Goodwill City"/ "I'm Sick of You"	1989	—	—	—	—	—	—	—	—	—	49		Good Deeds and Dirty Rags
"Love Child"	1990	—	—	—	—	—	—	—	—	—	52		Hammer and Tongs
"Blacker Than Black"	1990	—	—	—	—	—	—	—	—	—	61		Hammer and Tongs
"Now We Are Married"	1991	—	—	—	—	—	—	—	—	—	80		Hammer and Tongs
"Suffocate Me" EP	1993	—	—	—	—	—	—	—	—	—	—		Angelfish
"Heartbreak to Hate"	1994	—	—	—	—	—	—	—	—	—	—		Angelfish
"Vow"	1995	97	26	32	—	—	—	—	41	—	138		Garbage
"Subhuman"	1995	—	—	—	—	—	—	—	—	—	50		Non-album single
"Only Happy When It Rains"	1995	55	16	80	79	—	—	36	38	—	29		Garbage
"Queer"	1995	— (Note: "Queer" did not enter the Billboard Hot 100, but peaked at number 57 on the Radio Songs chart.)	12	55	—	—	—	—	37	—	13		Garbage
"Stupid Girl"	1996	24	2	47	30	—	16	—	32	—	4	BPI: Silver	Garbage
"Milk"	1996	— (Note: "Milk" did not enter the Billboard Hot 100, but peaked at number four on the Bubbling Under Hot 100 Singles chart.)	—	44	—	84	—	—	50	—	10		Garbage
"#1 Crush"	1997	— (Note: "#1 Crush" did not enter the Billboard Hot 100, but peaked at number 29 on the Radio Songs chart.)	1	—	20	—	—	—	—	—	—		Romeo + Juliet OST
"Push It"	1998	52	5	31	—	88	26	77	15	—	9		Version 2.0
"I Think I'm Paranoid"	1998	— (Note: "I Think I'm Paranoid" did not enter the Billboard Hot 100, but peaked at number 70 on the Radio Songs chart.)	6	57	—	98	—	94	19	—	9		Version 2.0
"Special"	1998	52	11	54	42	—	—	—	—	—	15		Version 2.0
"When I Grow Up"	1999	—	23	22	—	—	28	—	24	—	9		Version 2.0
"The Trick Is to Keep Breathing"	1999	—	—	—	—	— (Note: "The Trick Is to Keep Breathing" did not enter the German Singles Chart, but peaked at number 102 on the German Airplay Chart.)	—	—	—	—	—		Version 2.0
"You Look So Fine"	1999	—	—	101	—	—	—	—	—	—	19		Version 2.0
"The World Is Not Enough"	1999	—	—	—	—	38	30	48	—	16	11		The World Is Not Enough OST
"Androgyny"	2001	—	—	21	19	93	39	71	17	67	24		Beautiful Garbage
"Cherry Lips (Go Baby Go!)"	2002	—	—	7	—	—	27	80	22	85	22	ARIA: Gold	Beautiful Garbage
"Breaking Up the Girl"	2002	—	— (Note: "Breaking Up the Girl" did not enter the Billboard Alternative Airplay chart, but peaked at number 12 on the Adult Alternative Airplay chart.)	19	—	—	—	—	—	—	27		Beautiful Garbage
"Shut Your Mouth"	2002	—	—	74	—	—	—	—	—	—	20		Beautiful Garbage
"Why Do You Love Me"	2005	94	8	19	12	63	27	100	—	75	7		Bleed Like Me
"Bleed Like Me" (Note: A remix of "Bleed Like Me" by Eric Kupper also peaked at number six on the Hot Dance Music/Club Play chart.)	2005	—	27	—	—	—	—	—	—	—	—		Bleed Like Me
"Sex Is Not the Enemy"	2005	—	—	—	—	—	—	—	—	—	24		Bleed Like Me
"Run Baby Run"	2005	—	—	47	—	97	—	—	—	—	—		Bleed Like Me
"Tell Me Where It Hurts"	2007	—	—	—	—	—	—	—	—	—	50		Absolute Garbage
"Blood for Poppies"	2012	— (Note: "Blood for Poppies" did not enter the Billboard Hot 100, but peaked at number 13 on the Hot Singles Sales chart.)	17	—	—	—	—	—	—	—	—		Not Your Kind of People
"Battle in Me"	2012	—	—	—	—	—	—	—	—	—	—		Not Your Kind of People
"Big Bright World"	2012	—	—	—	—	—	—	—	—	—	—		Not Your Kind of People
"Control"	2012	—	—	—	—	—	—	—	—	—	—		Not Your Kind of People
"Because the Night" (with Screaming Females)	2013	— (Note: "Because the Night" did not enter the Billboard Hot 100, but peaked at number 23 on the Hot Singles Sales chart.)	—	—	—	—	—	—	—	—	—		Non-album singles
"Girls Talk" (with Brody Dalle)	2014	— (Note: "Girls Talk" did not enter the Billboard Hot 100, but peaked at number 10 on the Hot Singles Sales chart.)	—	—	—	—	—	—	—	—	—		Non-album singles
"The Chemicals" (with Brian Aubert)	2015	—	—	—	—	—	—	—	—	—	—		Non-album singles
"Empty"	2016	—	39	—	—	—	—	—	—	—	—		Strange Little Birds
"Magnetized"	2016	—	—	—	—	—	—	—	—	—	—		Strange Little Birds
"No Horses"	2017	—	—	—	—	—	—	—	—	—	—		Non-album singles
"Destroying Angels" (with John Doe and Exene Cervenka)	2018	—	—	—	—	—	—	—	—	—	—		Non-album singles
"The Men Who Rule the World"	2021	—	—	—	—	—	—	—	—	—	—		No Gods No Masters
"No Gods No Masters"	2021	—	—	—	—	—	—	—	—	—	—		No Gods No Masters
"Wolves"	2021	—	— (Note: "Wolves" did not enter the Billboard Alternative Airplay chart, but peaked at number 37 on the Adult Alternative Airplay chart.)	—	—	—	—	—	—	—	—		No Gods No Masters
"Witness To Your Love"	2022	—	—	—	—	—	—	—	—	—	—		Anthology
"Cities in Dust"	2023	—	—	—	—	—	—	—	—	—	—		Witness to Your Love
"There's No Future in Optimism"	2025	—	—	—	—	—	—	—	—	—	—		Let All That We Imagine Be the Light
"Get Out My Face AKA Bad Kitty"	2025	—	—	—	—	—	—	—	—	—	—		Let All That We Imagine Be the Light
"—" denotes a recording that did not chart or was not released in that territory.

|- | colspan="14" style="font-size:90%"| "—" denotes a recording that did not chart or was not released in that territory. |}

=== Promotional singles ===
List of promotional singles, with selected chart positions, showing year released and album name
Title	Year	Peak chart positions	Album
Title	Year	SPA Airplay	Album
"Supervixen"	1996	—	Garbage
"Temptation Waits"	1999	39	Version 2.0
"Automatic Systematic Habit"	2012	—	Not Your Kind of People
"Even Though Our Love Is Doomed"	2016	—	Strange Little Birds
"—" denotes a recording that did not chart or was not released in that territory.

=== Solo work ===
The first time Manson contributed her vocals to a project separately from any of her bands was in 1998, when she performed vocals for the chorus of a Garbage-produced remix of Fun Lovin' Criminals 1999 single "Korean Bodega". Due to litigation problems surrounding Manson's contractual obligation to Radioactive Records, further collaborations with both Fun Lovin' Criminals and Moby were unable to proceed.

Manson teamed up with Marilyn Manson and Tim Sköld in 2004 to record a cover version of the Human League's "Don't You Want Me" but both felt the track inappropriate for either acts upcoming albums, and remains unreleased. Later that year, Manson and Brody Dalle contributed backing vocals to a Queens of the Stone Age track. In 2006, Manson planned to record a John Lennon cover version for the Amnesty International Instant Karma charity compilation with bassist Eric Avery, however a scheduling misunderstanding left them short of time and unable to record the song. Manson and Avery eventually co-wrote and recorded "Maybe", a ballad duet for Avery's album Help Wanted.

The following year, Manson worked with long-time friend Chris Connelly, orating part of a long poem on his eighth album Forgiveness and Exile, and worked on a duet with longtime inspiration Debbie Harry which remains uncompleted.

Upon her taking on the role of Catherine Weaver in Terminator... and on the encouragement of series' composer Bear McCreary, Manson was asked by showrunner Josh Friedman to perform and co-create a gospel arrangement of "Samson and Delilah" for the opening episode of the second season. After much interest, the track was released on Terminator: The Sarah Connor Chronicles season one soundtrack at the end of 2008. Three years later Manson recorded vocals to a track composed by Serj Tankian and Steven Sater. The track, "The Hunger", which Sater describes as exploring "the hunger of the heart", features on their rock musical adaptation of Prometheus Bound, and was recreated with fresh instrumentation and new lyrics for the digital release, exclusively through iTunes worldwide. All proceeds made from sales of the single will benefit Amnesty International.

Manson has also given two tracks to Sky Ferreira; the 2012 single "Red Lips" and "I'm on Top" in 2013.

==== Solo appearances ====
Year	Song	Artist	Role(s)	Appears on
1998	"Korean Bodega" (Aero Mexicana mix)	Fun Lovin' Criminals	Featured vocals	A's, B's and Rarities (2004)
2004	"You Got a Killer Scene There, Man..."	Queens of the Stone Age	Backing vocals	Lullabies to Paralyze (2005)
2006	"Maybe"	Eric Avery	Vocals, lyrics	Help Wanted (2008)
2007	"The Trouble I'm In"	Gavin Rossdale	Vocals	Wanderlust (2008)
2007	"Forgiveness and Exile, Pt.3"	Chris Connelly	Orator	Forgiveness and Exile (2008)
2008	"Samson and Delilah"	Bear McCreary	Vocals	Terminator: The Sarah Connor Chronicles OST (2008)
2010	"Maneater"	The Bird and the Bee	Backing vocals	Interpreting the Masters Volume 1: A Tribute to Daryl Hall and John Oates (2010)
2011	"The Hunger"	Shirley Manson and Serj Tankian	Vocals	Prometheus Bound OST (2011)
2011	"Dirty Dog"	Shirley Manson	Vocals	It Is What It Is (Vic Chesnutt documentary)
2012	"Dark Hearts & Heart Beats"	Shirley Manson and Gabrial McNair	Performer, co-writer	Dark Hearts soundtrack (2014)
2014	"Meet the Foetus/Oh the Joy"	Brody Dalle	Vocals	Diploid Love (2014)
2014	"Shame, You're All I've Got"	Le Butcherettes featuring Shirley Manson	Vocals	Cry Is For the Flies (2014)
2015	"Brass Muscles"	Craig Wedren featuring Shirley Manson	Vocals	Wet Hot American Summer: First Day of Camp soundtrack (2015)
2017	"Queen of the Bored"	Brian Reitzell featuring Shirley Manson	Vocals	American Gods soundtrack (2017)
2018	"The Sun"	Pondus	Vocals	The Sun single (2018)
2018	"Invisible"	HIRS Collective	Spoken word intro	Friends. Lovers. Favorites. album (2018)
2020	"Medicated"	Du Blonde	Backing vocals	Homecoming album (2021), lead single
2021	"Alien Inside"	Arca	Guest vocals	KiCk iiii album (2021)
2022	"We're Still Here"	HIRS Collective	Guest vocals	We're Still Here album (2022, lead single)

==== Shirley Manson & Serj Tankian single ====
Year	Release	Label
2011	"The Hunger (Amnesty International version)"	Serjical Strike Records

=== Sampling ===
In 2002, electronic group West London Deep sampled Manson's vocal from "You Look So Fine" in their white label track "You're Taking Me Over". Manson refused clearance for the sample and the track was scrapped. By that point the track, and remixes by Inner City, Problem Kids and Desyn Masiello and Leon Roberts had already been circulated. The song was reworked and re-released the following year as "Gonna Make You My Lover", without Manson's vocal.

== See also ==
- Garbage
  - Garbage discography
  - Awards and nominations received by Garbage
- Goodbye Mr Mackenzie
- Angelfish
