= Martin Metcalfe =

Scottish artist

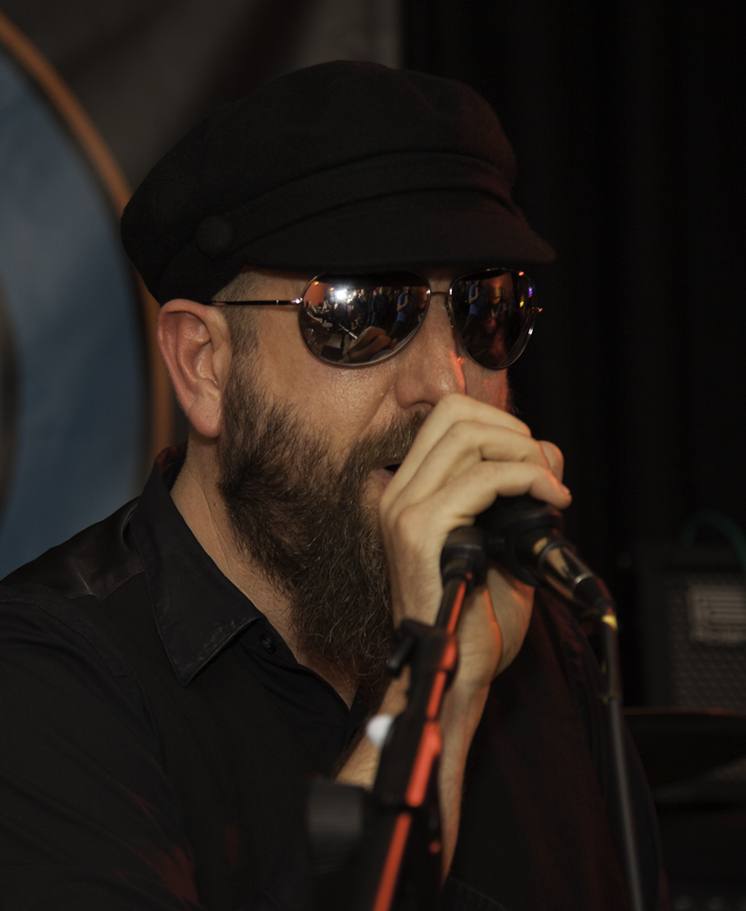
- Metcalfe performing in September 2017

Background information
- Born: Bathgate, Scotland
- Genres: Alternative rock, indie rock
- Occupations: Singer; songwriter; musician; artist
- Instruments: Vocals; guitar
- Years active: 1981–present
- Labels: Capitol; Parlophone; Radioactive; Blokshok
- Member of: Goodbye Mr Mackenzie; The Filthy Tongues
- Formerly of: Angelfish
- Website: http://www.martinmetcalfe.com/

Martin Metcalfe is a Scottish singer and guitarist from Bathgate, Scotland. His career began in 1981 fronting the alternative rock band Goodbye Mr Mackenzie who released their debut album Good Deeds and Dirty Rags in April 1989. The album was a moderate commercial success in the United Kingdom and spawned the commercially successful singles "Goodbye Mr. Mackenzie", "Open Your Arms", "The Rattler" and "Face to Face". With their contract sold by Capitol Records to Radioactive and MCA, they released their second album Hammer and Tongs in 1991, supported by the singles "Love Child", "Blacker Than Black" and "Now We Are Married".

A third album, Five followed in 1994, which was recorded at the same time as the debut album from Goodbye Mr Mackenzie's side project Angelfish which featured Shirley Manson on lead vocals rather than Metcalfe. The song "Suffocate Me" by Angelfish was played on MTV's 120 Minutes which lead to Manson leaving both bands to join Garbage in 1994, with Angelfish disbanding in 1995. Goodbye Mr Mackenzie released their fourth and final album, The Glory Hole in 1996. Following the disbandment, Metcalfe formed The Filthy Tongues in 2005, and in 2019, Goodbye Mr Mackenzie reformed to tour Scotland and re–released their first two studio albums.

== Career ==
=== Goodbye Mr Mackenzie ===
Goodbye Mr Mackenzie was formed when Martin Metcalfe moved on from his first band Teenage Dog Orgy in 1984. They were named after author Jean Rhys's 1931 novel After Leaving Mr. Mackenzie. Their first single was released through a pilot music industry course run by Bathgate College under the Youth Training Scheme, a split-single 7-inch format of "Death of a Salesman" in 1984. Limited to 1,000 copies, and with a track by Lindy Bergman on the flipside, it quickly sold out. Shortly after, they signed a management deal with Precious Organisation, who had just launched another Scottish group, Wet Wet Wet. Precious managed to include both groups on Honey at the Core, a 1986 compilation of up and coming Scottish acts compiled by Glasgow Herald journalist John Williamson, and released the band's first commercial single "The Rattler". The single suffered from a lack of distribution, but received airplay on Radio One and Radio Clyde. A home-made music video for the single was broadcast on The Chart Show. The band also performed "The Rattler" on The Tube. Precious organised an A&R showcase in Glasgow but, as the band did not receive any interest from the labels invited, they chose to leave Precious.

After leaving their management, they released an independent 12-inch single, "Face to Face", in 1987, and signed a major label record deal with Capitol Records. Capitol issued three multi-formatted singles, of which a re-release of "The Rattler" was the most successful, charting at No. 37 in 1989. The label followed up the band's chart debut with Good Deeds and Dirty Rags, which reached No. 23 on the UK Albums Chart. A further single from the album, "Goodwill City", reversed the band's upward trend, stalling at No. 49. Capitol ended the year by releasing Fish Heads and Tails, a mid-price live and B-side compilation, while the band relocated to studios in Berlin to record their second album. While at the studios, the band witnessed the Fall of the Berlin Wall.

The following year, the band were transferred sideways across EMI, from Capitol to Parlophone. Parlophone sold the band's record deal to Radioactive Records and MCA, who released Hammer and Tongs in the United Kingdom in early 1991 and encouraged the band to record a new song "Now We Are Married" to promote the release. Later that year, Radioactive, and their partners MCA, repackaged the album for international release by including several stand-out tracks from the band's debut album Good Deeds and Dirty Rags and eponymously re-titling the album as Goodbye Mr. Mackenzie. The band continued to write material; Manson was also given the opportunity to record lead vocals on a number of tracks planned for the band's third album, titled Five.

==== Reformation ====
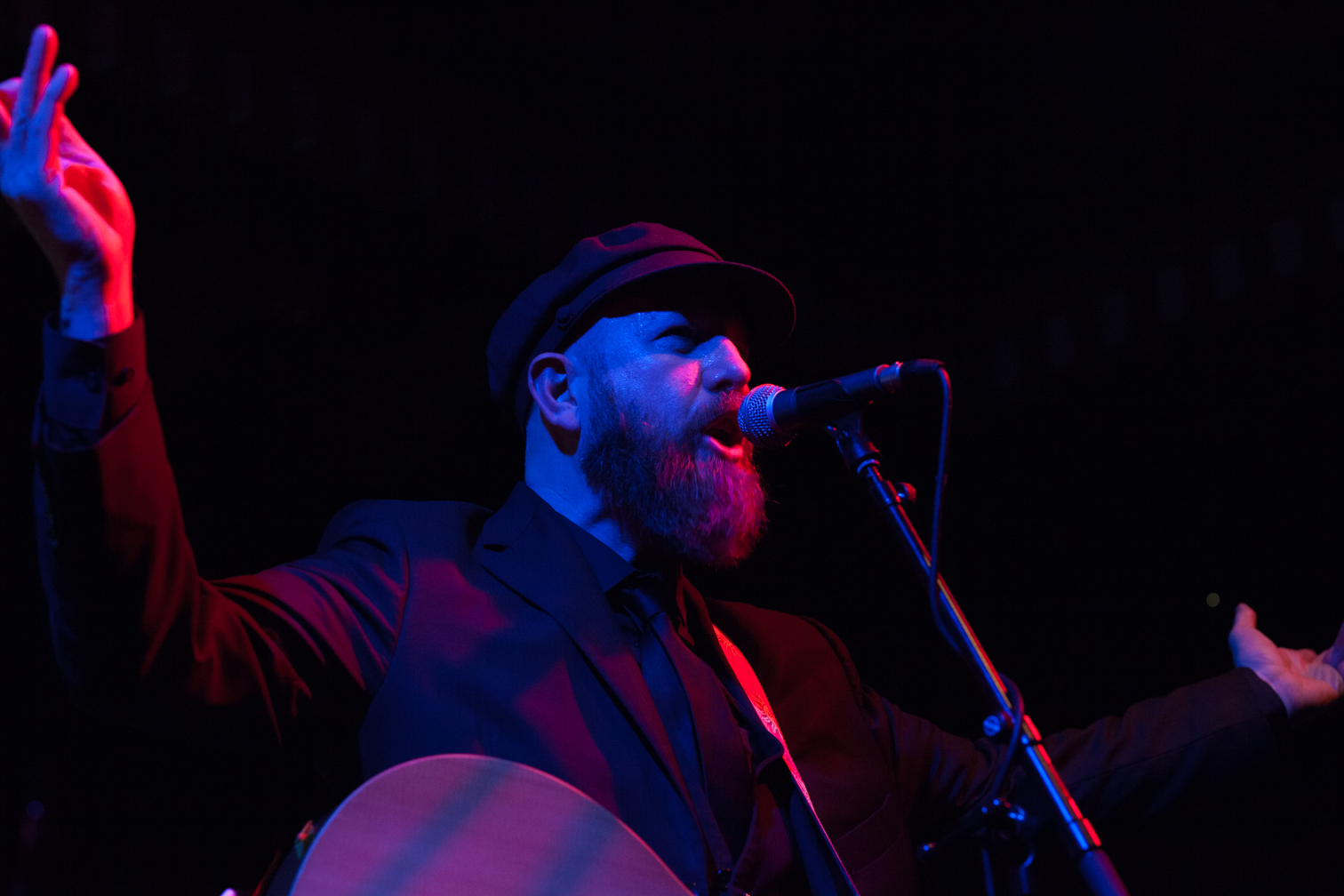
Metcalfe performing in Edinburgh, 2018

In an interview with the Edinburgh Evening News on 4 April 2019, Martin Metcalfe announced that Goodbye Mr Mackenzie would be reforming and would be performing a mini Scottish Tour. Warm up gigs were performed in Dundee on 17 May and Dunfermline on 18 May, followed by full shows in Glasgow at The Garage (venue of their farewell concert) on 22 May, Aberdeen Lemon Tree on 23 May and Edinburgh Liquid Rooms on 25 and 26 May 2019. These shows were followed up by a winter tour of the UK, culminating in a sold out performance at the Glasgow Barrowlands on 20 December.

During interviews to promote their tour, Metcalfe revealed that a number of hurdles had to be overcome to reunite the band, including Duncan's multiple sclerosis and the fact that Scobie had not played keyboard in over 20 years. He described Duncan's ability to relearn his guitar parts in spite of his ongoing health concerns as "something of a miracle". In April 2024, the band announced six more concerts in October to celebrate the 30th anniversary of their third album, Five. The same month, the album was remastered and reissued. On 7 November 2024, Five debuted at number five on the Scottish Albums Charts, giving the band their first entry on the national albums chart in Scotland, and on 1 December 2024, Five was released digitally.

=== Angelfish ===
Angelfish released a single self-titled studio album, Angelfish, and two singles of which the first was an EP for minor college radio hit "Suffocate Me". The Angelfish album was born out of necessity when Goodbye Mr Mackenzie's record distributor MCA expressed interest in recording an album with Manson on lead vocals rather than furthering its commitment to the Mackenzies. The Mackenzies' record label boss Gary Kurfirst signed Manson as a solo artist, with the remaining Mackenzies performing as her backing band to circumvent the band's existing deal with MCA. Angelfish received a positive response from contemporary music critics and journalists. Barry Egan of Creem wrote: "Their self-titled debut displays the kind of out-of-kilter charm and intensity that most artists can only lie about possessing... this is indeed a record that owes much to Scotland's Cocteau Twins as it does to Lou Reed's feel-good dark angels, The Velvet Underground."

=== The Filthy Tongues ===
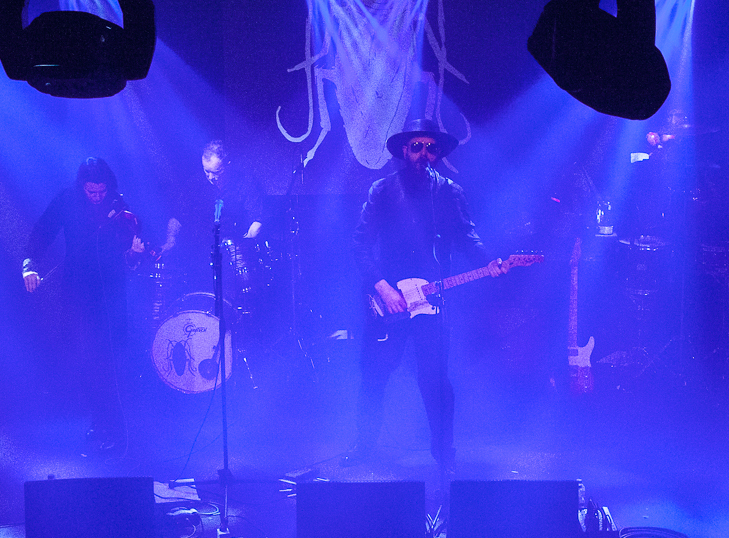
Metcalfe with The Filthy Tongues, 2017

An earlier incarnation of the band, Isa & The Filthy Tongues, featured American singer-songwriter Stacey Chavis on lead vocals. Their first album, Addiction was released on Circular Records in May 2006. It was re-released in 2009.

Dark Passenger came out through Neon Tetra Records in 2010. Scotland on Sunday compared Metcalfe's performance on "Beautiful Girl" to the Sensational Alex Harvey Band.

Isa & The Filthy Tongues contributed the song "Big Star" to the film Spread, directed by fellow Scot David Mackenzie and starring Ashton Kutcher and Anne Heche. They also contributed five songs including the title track to the film New Town Killers directed by Richard Jobson, who co-wrote the song and also sings on "New Town Killers".

=== Other works ===
Metcalfe is currently in the band The Fornicators and also paints.

=== Songwriting ===
Metcalfe contributed song-writing to four tracks on the 2018 Skids album, Burning Cities, which charted at 28 on the Billboard Top 100.

== Discography ==
=== Goodbye Mr Mackenzie ===
- Good Deeds and Dirty Rags (1989)
- Fish Heads & Tails (1989)
- Hammer and Tongs (1991)
- Live On The Day Of Storms (1994)
- Five (1994)
- The Glory Hole (1996)

=== Angelfish ===
- Angelfish (1994)

=== The Filthy Tongues ===
- Addiction (2006)
- Dark Passenger (2010)
- Jacob's Ladder (2016)
- Back to Hell (2018)
- In These Dark Places (2023)
- Black Valentine (The Best of the Filthy Tongues) (2023)
- DAMASCENE (With Paul Hullah) (2024)
- Revelations Of Rab McVie (Live) (2025)
