= The Way I Walk =

EP by Goodbye Mr Mackenzie
- Released: October 10, 1994
- Studio: REL Studios, Edinburgh
- Genre: Alternative rock, new wave
- Length: 2:47
- Label: Blokshok
- Producer: Goodbye Mr Mackenzie

Goodbye Mr Mackenzie chronology
Hard EP (1993)	The Way I Walk (1994)

The Way I Walk is a 1994 extended play single by Scottish alternative rock group Goodbye Mr Mackenzie.

A cover version of Jack Scott's 1959 single "The Way I Walk", the A-side is the first song by Goodbye Mr Mackenzie that guitarist John Duncan provided lead vocals for. It is the band's first release since keyboardist and backing vocalist Shirley Manson left the group's side-project Angelfish to join American alternative group Garbage (however Manson's backing vocal remains on "You Will"), and it is also the band's final single release.

The original recording of "Sick Baby" appeared on the band's second major label album Hammer and Tongs. "Superman" was previously recorded by Mackenzie side-project Angelfish as "Trash It", which appeared on their 1993 Suffocate Me EP. A live recording of "You Will", titled "You Will Be My Slave", appears on the band's live album Live on the Day of Storms.

== Track listings ==
- UK 12" single Blokshok Records BLOK 003 T
- UK CD single Blokshok Records BLOK 003 CD
1. "The Way I Walk" - 2:47
2. "Superman" - 3:02
3. "Sick Baby ('94)" - 3:52
4. "You Will" - 3:06
