= Shirley Manson =

Scottish singer (born 1966)

Shirley Manson FRSA
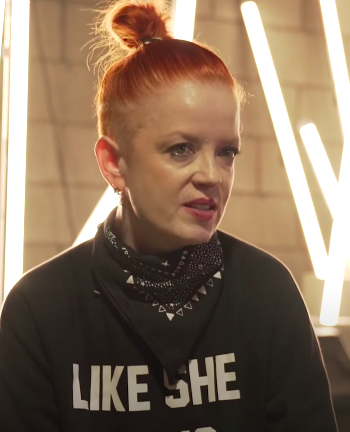
- Manson in 2018
- Born: Shirley Ann Manson; 26 August 1966 (age 60); Edinburgh, Scotland
- Occupations: Singer; songwriter; musician; podcast host; philanthropist; actress
- Years active: 1984–present
- Works: Discography
- Spouse(s): Eddie Farrell (m. 1996–2003); Billy Bush (m. 2010)
- Musical career
- Genres: Alternative rock; dream pop; electronic rock
- Instruments: Vocals; keyboard; guitar
- Member of: Garbage
- Formerly of: Angelfish; Goodbye Mr. Mackenzie

Shirley Ann Manson (born 26 August 1966) is a Scottish singer, songwriter, and musician who is the lead vocalist of the rock band Garbage. Deemed a "Godmother of Rock" by The New York Times, she is noted for her distinctive deep voice, forthright style, and rebellious attitude. As of 2017, Garbage have sold over 17 million records; her accolades with the band include nominations for two Brit Awards and seven Grammy Awards.

Manson's musical career began in her teens, when she was approached to perform backing vocals and keyboards for the band Goodbye Mr Mackenzie. She was later approached by the band's record label with the idea of launching her as a solo artist, and recorded an album with her band Angelfish. She joined Garbage in 1994, and they achieved critical and commercial success with their self-titled debut album (1995) and Version 2.0 (1998). During this period, they released a string of successful singles including "Queer", "Only Happy When It Rains", "Stupid Girl", "Milk", "Push It", "Special" and "When I Grow Up". They followed this by performing and co-producing the theme song to the 19th James Bond film The World Is Not Enough (1999) and releasing their acclaimed third album Beautiful Garbage (2001), preceded by successful singles including "Androgyny" and "Cherry Lips".

Following the troubled production of Garbage's fourth album Bleed Like Me (2005), the group went on hiatus; during this period, they released a greatest hits album (2007). Manson began to write and record solo material in 2006, and played Catherine Weaver on the science fiction television series Terminator: The Sarah Connor Chronicles (2008). Garbage reunited in 2010, and have since released four more albums: Not Your Kind of People (2012), Strange Little Birds (2016), No Gods No Masters (2021) and the acclaimed Let All That We Imagine Be the Light (2025). Manson also hosted the music podcast The Jump with Shirley Manson (2019–2021).

== Early life ==
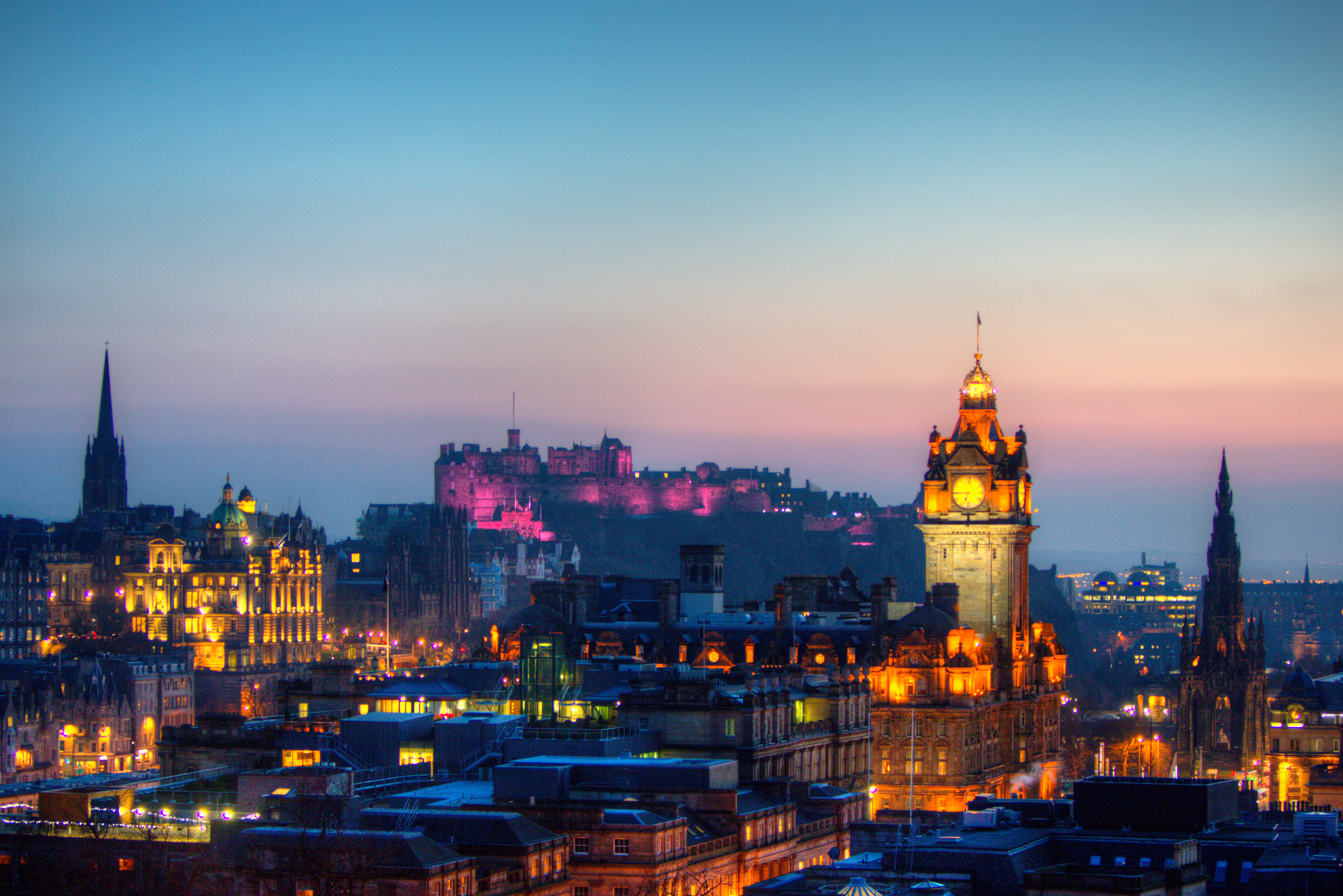
Manson was born and raised in Edinburgh, Scotland

Shirley Ann Manson was born in Edinburgh on 26 August 1966, the daughter of Muriel Flora (née MacKay) and John Mitchell Manson. Her father, a descendant from the fishing community of Northmavine, was a university lecturer, while her mother was a big band singer who had been adopted by a Lothian-based family at an early age and took on the family name MacDonald. Manson was named after an aunt, who was herself named after Charlotte Brontë's novel Shirley. She has two sisters: Lindy-Jayne who is two years older and Sarah who is two years younger. They were brought up in the Comely Bank and Stockbridge areas of Edinburgh in an old Victorian three-storey house. She attended Broughton High School and her childhood education was informed by the Church of Scotland (her father was her Sunday school teacher) until age 12.

Despite not having ever considered herself an artist until her forties and still not considering herself a musician, Manson's first experiences with music are rooted in her childhood and she received education in playing many instruments. Her first public performance was in 1970, at age four, singing "Never Smile at a Crocodile" with her older sister in an amateur show held at the local Church Hill Theatre. Enrolled at Flora Stevenson Primary School, she received instruction in recorder, clarinet, and fiddle, and learned ballet and piano from extramural classes at age seven, when she also joined a choir. Manson was a member of Girlguiding UK throughout this period of her youth as a Brownie and a Girl Guide. She attended the City of Edinburgh Music School, the music department of Broughton High School. At about age nine, Manson joined the school orchestra. While at Broughton, she became an active member of its drama group, performing in amateur dramatic and musical performances such as The American Dream and The Wizard of Oz, while also singing with the Waverley Singers, a local girl choir. A 1981 Edinburgh Festival Fringe production of Maurice the Minotaur, in which Manson played a prophet, was awarded a Fringe First award by The Scotsman newspaper.

While she enjoyed primary school, Manson was bullied while in her first year at secondary school, causing her to suffer from depression and body dysmorphic disorder and engage in self-injury: she carried sharp objects in the laces of her boots and would cut herself when she felt low self-esteem, stress, or anxiety. The bullying stopped when Manson associated herself with a rebel crowd, which resulted in her rebelling herself. She was absent for most of her final year at school and began smoking cannabis, sniffing glue, drinking alcohol, shoplifting, and on one occasion breaking into Edinburgh Zoo. Manson had teenage ambitions to become an actress, but was rejected by the Royal Scottish Academy of Music and Drama (RSAMD). Her first job was volunteer work in a local hospital's cafeteria, then as a breakfast waitress at a local hotel, before spending five years as a shop assistant for Miss Selfridge. She started on the shop's makeup counters, but was eventually moved into stockrooms because of her attitude toward customers. She became well known throughout Edinburgh's clubbing scene; making use of free samples from Miss Selfridge, she styled hair for a number of local bands. She also briefly modelled clothing for Jackie magazine.

== Music career ==
=== Early work and recognition ===
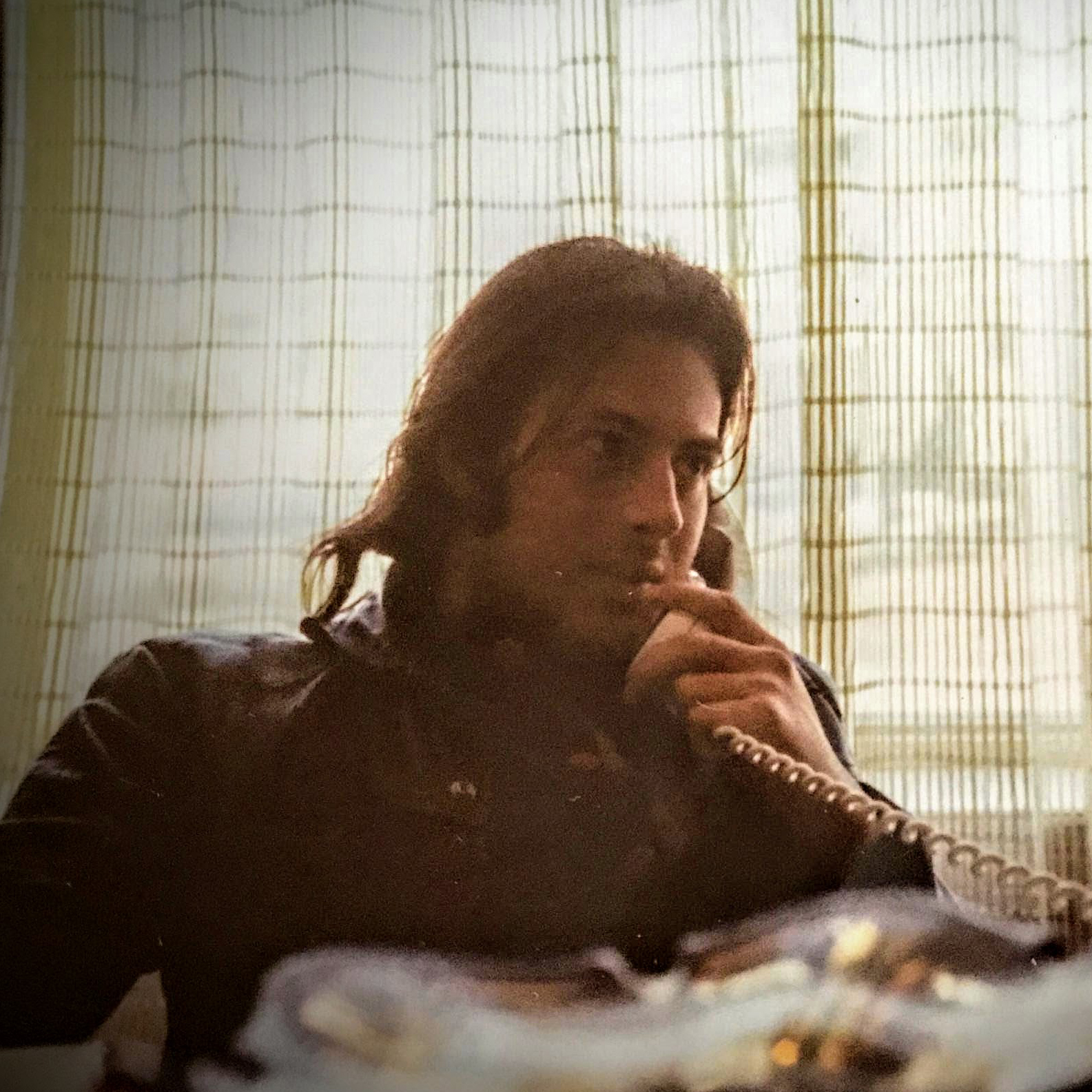
Manson and her band signed to Radioactive Records, founded by Gary Kurfirst (pictured), but were later persuaded to leave by the band's management

Manson's first musical experiences came from briefly singing with local Edinburgh acts The Wild Indians and performed backing vocals with Autumn 1904. While she was performing with her group, Manson was approached by Goodbye Mr Mackenzie's lead Martin Metcalfe to join his band. Manson was in a relationship with Metcalfe initially, but remained working with the band after splitting from him and became a prominent member, performing keyboards, backing vocals and becoming involved in the band's business side. Manson's first release with the Mackenzies was a YTS release of "Death of a Salesman" in 1984. The group signed a major-label record deal with Capitol Records in 1987, and they released their first album Good Deeds and Dirty Rags, and their only UK top 40 entry "The Rattler". In 1990, the group's contract was transferred to Parlophone, another EMI label, but after two singles failed to chart Parlophone declined to release the group's second album Hammer and Tongs.

Gary Kurfirst, who managed Talking Heads and Debbie Harry, bought the Mackenzies contract and issued their second album through his own label Radioactive Records, a subsidiary of MCA Records. After another single failed to chart, the group were persuaded to leave Radioactive by their management. The Mackenzies continued to write material; Manson was also given the opportunity to record lead vocals on a number of tracks planned for the band's third album. Although MCA had no desire to further their commitments to Goodbye Mr. Mackenzie, the label expressed interest in recording an album with Manson, and after hearing several demos, Kurfirst signed Manson to Radioactive as a solo artist, with the remaining Mackenzies performing as her backing band to circumvent the band's existing deal with MCA. Manson's contract obliged her to deliver at least one album and, at the sole option of Radioactive, up to six additional albums.

Recording under the name Angelfish, and using some of the newly written material and a previously released Mackenzie b-side, Manson and the group recorded the tracks that would make up the Angelfish album in Connecticut with Talking Heads' Chris Frantz and Tina Weymouth. A lead-in track, "Suffocate Me", was sent to college radio where it was well received. Angelfish and second single "Heartbreak to Hate" followed in 1994. Angelfish toured Belgium, Canada, France, and the U.S. The band co-supported Live on a tour of North America, along with Vic Chestnutt. The music video for "Suffocate Me" was aired once on MTV's 120 Minutes.

=== Breakthrough with Garbage ===
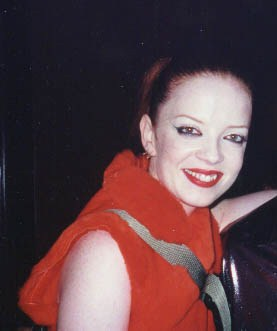
Manson during the Version 2.0 era with Garbage, (c. 1998–99)

Producer and musician Steve Marker caught the broadcast of "Suffocate Me" and thought Manson would be a great singer for his band, Garbage, which also featured producers Duke Erikson and Butch Vig. Vig invited Manson to Smart Studios to sing on a couple of tracks. After an unsuccessful audition, she returned to Angelfish. Manson admitted she felt intimidated showcasing herself to Vig, who produced bands she admired such as Nirvana, Sonic Youth, and The Smashing Pumpkins, and Vig added that the audition's disorganized nature along with the Americans not understanding Manson's Scottish accent caused communication problems. At the end of the Live tour, Angelfish imploded and Manson returned to Smart for a second try. She began to work on the then-skeletal origins of some songs and the band invited her to become a full-time member and finish the album; she co-wrote and co-produced the entire album with the rest of the band.

In August 1994, Radioactive gave their permission for Manson to work with Garbage. The band's debut album Garbage was released in August 1995, and went on to sell over 4 million copies, buoyed by a run of high charting singles including "Only Happy When It Rains" and "Stupid Girl." Manson quickly became the public face of the band over the course of a tour that took the band through to the end of 1996. Echo & the Bunnymen had asked Manson to sing on their 1997 comeback album. Manson became the band's chief songwriter for the follow-up record Version 2.0 which equalled the success of the band's debut record after its May 1998 release. During the two-year tour in support of the record, Manson modelled for Calvin Klein. Manson lived in hotels throughout the recording periods of the debut and Version 2.0.

Garbage recorded the theme song to the James Bond movie The World Is Not Enough in 1999, and Manson became the third Scotswoman to sing a Bond theme after Lulu and Sheena Easton. In the accompanying video, she portrays an android assassin. For the recording of Garbage's third record throughout 2000, Manson became one of the first high-profile artists to write a blog online, while she decided to improve her guitar playing for the band's next tour. The band's third album, Beautiful Garbage, did not sell as well as its predecessors, but Garbage performed a successful world tour in support of it. During a concert at the Roskilde Festival, Manson's voice gave out. She afterwards discovered a vocal fold cyst, and had to undergo corrective surgery. Garbage's fourth record, Bleed Like Me, was released in 2005 after the surprise success of lead-in single "Why Do You Love Me". The album posted some of the band's highest chart positions upon release. Garbage then began an extended hiatus in October 2005.

=== Solo efforts and collaborations ===
"I had taken some of my solo music into the record label. They didn't really care for the direction I was moving in and I found it really disheartening. They wanted a pop hit, which I understand in terms of making money. I get that. But what they were going to ask of me was something I wasn't prepared to deliver and I felt kind of trapped. I just stopped writing. I just stopped. It was stifling".

— Shirley Manson

Manson confirmed in March 2006 that she had begun work on a solo album, working with musician Paul Buchanan, producer Greg Kurstin, and film composer David Arnold, stating that she had "no timetable" for completing the project. In 2007, Manson collaborated with Rivers Cuomo of Weezer. Manson presented some of her work to Geffen Records in 2008, who found it "too noir", prompting Manson and Geffen to terminate her contract by mutual agreement. Manson later elaborated, "[Geffen] wanted me to have international radio hits and 'be the Annie Lennox of my generation'. I kid you not; I am quoting directly." "I made a quiet, very dark, non-radio-friendly record," she recalled. "I'm not interested in writing nursery rhymes for the masses."

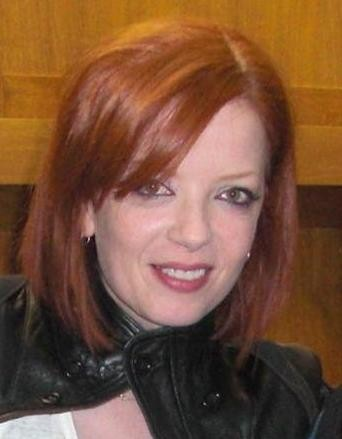
Manson in 2009 during her solo era

During Garbage's hiatus, in 2007, they reformed to perform a short set at a benefit show to raise cash to pay for Wally Ingram's medical treatment, shared song ideas via the internet, recorded new material, and filmed a music video to promote the band's Absolute Garbage greatest hits compilation. Manson continued to write material while without a record deal and had been in talks with David Byrne and Ray Davies about a potential collaboration. In 2009, Manson posted three demos on her Facebook profile, written with Kurstin, titled "In the Snow", "Pretty Horses" and "Lighten Up". "Pretty Horses" was later featured in the pilot episode of the show Conviction. 14 additional songs co-written with Kurstin and registered on copyright and performance rights societies included “Don't Want To Pretend”, “Don't Want Anyone Hurt”, “Gone Upside”, “Hot Shit”, “Kid Ourselves”, “Little Dough”, “Pure Genius”, “Sweet Old World”, “Spooky”, “So Shines a Good Deed”, “The Desert”, “No Regrets”, “Stop”, and “To Be King”.

In 2009, Manson announced she was stepping away from music, saying she got sick of the music industry's new practices and had found more excitement in her acting ventures. Manson said she thought about abandoning the music business in 2008 when her mother developed dementia, and later died, saying that "I didn't want to make music, didn't feel creative. I could barely function." She was convinced to return that same year after being asked by friends Jeff Castelaz and Jo Ann Thrailkill to sing David Bowie's "Life on Mars?" at their son's memorial. According to Manson, "we were all in so much pain, but it meant so much to them that I could sing that song and so much to me that I was able to do something. It made me realise how much music sustains people. I don't know why I'd turned my back on it."

Manson also worked with a number of artists outside of her solo project, reciting a verse of a long poem for a Chris Connelly album, co-writing and recording a duet with Eric Avery for his solo debut recording with Debbie Harry. Although not recording material with them, Manson also performed on-stage with The Pretenders, Iggy Pop, Incubus and Kings of Leon in Atlantic City, with Gwen Stefani and twice with No Doubt in Universal City. Most recently Manson performed vocals on a track written by Serj Tankian entitled "The Hunger", a single from the rock musical Prometheus Bound.

=== Return to Garbage ===
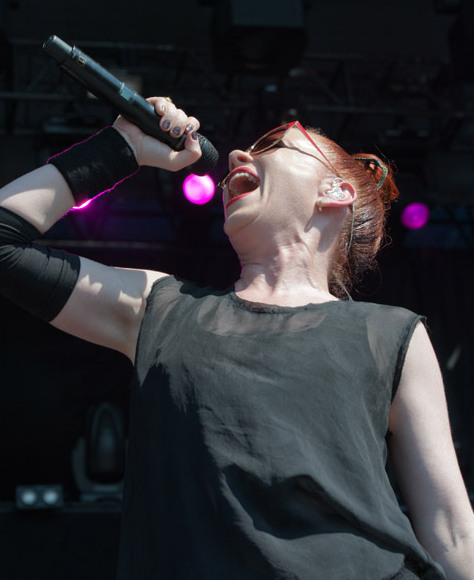
Manson performing with Garbage at Music Midtown in 2012

Garbage returned to the studio in 2010 to write and record material for a fifth album, entitled Not Your Kind of People and subsequently released in May 2012, thus ending the band's seven-year hiatus from recording. Also in 2012, Manson confirmed that work on her solo album had been cancelled, stating the album "[is] dead and buried. We had the funeral. It was sad and I cried a lot but it made such a beautiful corpse that we had an open casket."

In 2021, Garbage supported Alanis Morissette's 2020 World Tour: Celebrating 25 Years of Jagged Little Pill, which had been postponed due to COVID-19. At several performances, Manson wore a variation on "Garden Witch Overalls", popularised by feminist poet Kate Baer through her interview on the podcast Gee Thanks, Just Bought It, hosted by Caroline Moss. Manson paired the overalls with knee-high boots and assorted t-shirts. On March 30, 2021, Garbage released the song "The Men Who Rule the World", the lead single from their seventh studio album, No Gods No Masters, which was released on June 11, 2021. On April 28, the album's title track "No Gods No Masters" was released as the second single, followed by "Wolves" on May 19. No Gods No Masters was supported in summer 2021 with an arena concert tour with Garbage as guests of Alanis Morissette. The tour went on to become the most successful female-fronted tour of the year, selling more than 500,000 tickets.

On September 7, 2022, Garbage announced their third greatest hits album Anthology, released on October 28. The compilation features 35 newly remastered tracks celebrating three decades of career, including "Witness To Your Love", which was released as a single. Early in 2022, Garbage started writing for their upcoming eighth studio album. In October, after fulfilling their touring obligations, Garbage resumed writing for the album. In February 2023, Garbage announced their Summer 2023 co-headline North American tour with Noel Gallagher's High Flying Birds featuring Metric as special guests. On 4 March 2024, Garbage announced a UK and European tour, marking their first UK tour in five years. The headlining tour includes dates in Germany, Italy, France, Denmark, and a date at the Wembley Arena in England. Two dates were confirmed in Manson's native Scotland – a main stage slot at the TRNSMT festival in Glasgow, and a date at the Usher Hall in Edinburgh.

Garbage's eighth album, Let All That We Imagine Be the Light, was released in May 2025, and was supported by a North American tour beginning in September 2025. Paul Sinclair wrote a positive early review of the album on Super Deluxe Edition, calling it "a real return to form" and "the group's best collection of songs since the original era (1995)."

== Other ventures ==
=== Acting career ===
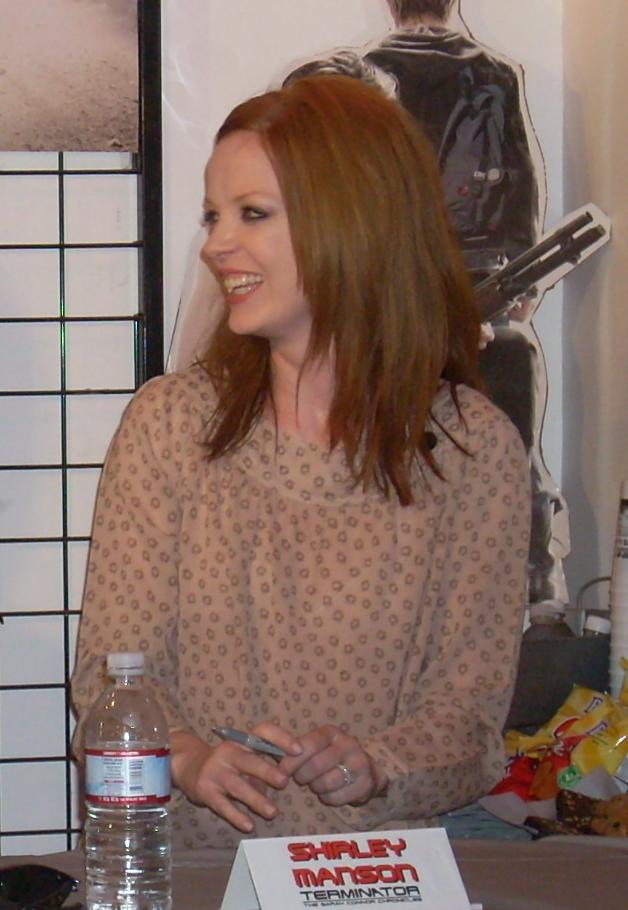
Manson at a promotional event for Terminator: The Sarah Connor Chronicles

In 2006, Manson performed in an uncredited role as a dominatrix in the music video for She Wants Revenge's single "These Things".

Manson was cast in Terminator: The Sarah Connor Chronicles in May 2008, after being asked to appear by series creator Josh Friedman and enduring a multiple audition process, beating out other actresses including Julie Ann Emery. She debuted in the season two premiere episode "Samson and Delilah" as Catherine Weaver, CEO of a technology company, ZeiraCorp. At the conclusion of the episode, Weaver is revealed to be a liquid-metal T-1001 Terminator. Manson also performed and co-arranged a rock and blues version of the gospel song "Samson and Delilah" for the episode's score. She also played the human Weaver in archive footage viewed by the T-1001 in the episode "The Tower Is Tall, But the Fall Is Short".

In 2009, Manson made her first venture into the video game industry as an avatar of herself for the Guitar Hero franchise. In the fifth game in the series, Manson is an unlockable character, while the game also features a licensed Garbage track.

In 2010, Manson was one of the final guests to appear on the cult US children's show Pancake Mountain. Featured in a segment titled "Around the World with Shirley Manson", she talked about music from other countries. She filmed five such segments but none aired before creator Scott Stuckey and producer J. J. Abrams canceled the show. One segment, featuring Germany, was eventually released and featured an original theme song sung by Manson and written by Stuckey.

In 2012, Manson played Nicole in the political thriller film Knife Fight.

In 2019, Manson travelled to Santiago, Chile, to participate in the making of Peace Peace Now Now, a documentary telling "stories of women who challenged armed conflicts around the world." The first season of the documentary came out on 23 November 2022 on Star+.

=== Charity and philanthropy ===
Manson has used Garbage's profile and her own to raise awareness and secure funds for a number of causes. She commissioned a Garbage branded lipgloss online, with all proceeds from the sales split between Grampian Children's Cancer Research and cancer treatment institutions at Royal Aberdeen Children's Hospital in Scotland and the Memorial Sloan Kettering Hospital in New York.

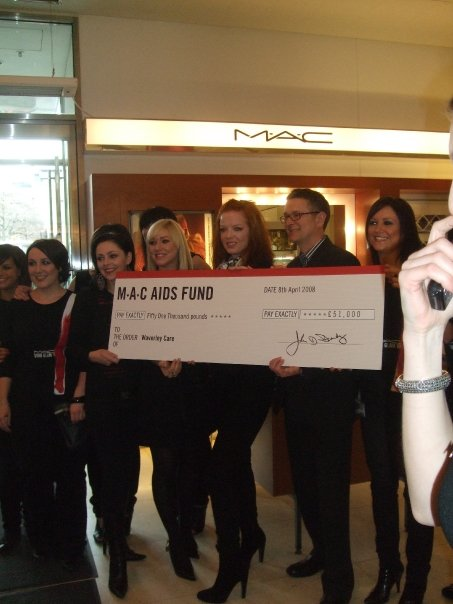
Manson donating £51,000 to Waverley Care on behalf of MAC AIDS Fund.

In 2001, Manson became an ambassador for the M•A•C AIDS Fund, fronting their fourth two-year charity lipstick marketing campaign alongside Elton John and Mary J. Blige, beginning with the launch of the VIVAMAC IV lipstick in March 2002, in which all proceeds of the sale of the lipstick goes to help fund AIDS charities and initiatives. While touring, Manson visited several AIDS charities in Amsterdam, Edinburgh, Toronto, New York, San Francisco and Madison to make several donations totalling over $300,000 on behalf of the M•A•C AIDS Fund.

In 2003, the M•A•C AIDS Fund linked with the Elton John AIDS Foundation to produce the White Bedroom campaign, where both Elton John and Manson recorded PSAs promoting condom use and stating facts on AIDS. By 2007, the combined six VIVAMAC campaigns had raised over $100 million U.S. dollars, and as a former ambassador Manson accepted a cheque for £51,000 on behalf of HIV charity Waverley Care from the M•A•C AIDS Fund on 10 April 2008 at Harvey Nichols Edinburgh store. Manson had become a patron of Waverley Care in October 2002 and previously hosted a fund raiser auction to raise funds for the charity in January 2004 which raised £45,000. A Fender guitar owned by Manson raised £1,050, while other items auctioned included contributions sourced by Manson herself, from Elton John and Kylie Minogue.

In 2008, Manson became involved with The Pablove Foundation, a charity founded by Dangerbird Records head Jeff Castelaz, whose son Pablo succumbed to cancer the following year. Castelaz, whose family Manson had befriended in the 90s, had asked Manson to sing "Life on Mars?" at their sons' memorial. Funds raised for The Pablove Foundation fund pediatric cancer research and educational and quality of life programming for families dealing with childhood cancer. Manson reformed Garbage to contribute an exclusive track, "Witness to Your Love", to a charity album for the Foundation, and signed a Pablove poster for auction on eBay. Manson also hosted a fundraiser headlined by the Silversun Pickups, and performed acoustically on-stage at a second fundraiser with Butch Vig and Laura Jane Grace (for a rendition of "Witness...") and with Greg Kurstin (for a cover of Pablo's favourite song, David Bowie's "Life on Mars?").

In 2010, Manson donated two hand-decorated T-shirts to Binki Shapiro's (of the band Little Joy) online charity auction "Crafts for a Cause" to raise money for victims of the 2010 Haiti earthquake. The two T-shirts raised a total of $1522.00, which was donated to the Artists for Peace and Justice organisation.

In 2015, Manson headlined Pablove 6, the sixth-annual fundraiser for the Pablove Foundation. She made a special appearance with Chicago-based David Bowie tribute band Sons of the Silent Age, featuring Matt Walker and Chris Connelly.

=== The Jump with Shirley Manson ===
From 2019 to 2021, Manson hosted the music podcast The Jump with Shirley Manson, co-produced by Mailchimp Presents and Little Everywhere, with executive producers Dann Gallucci, Jane Marie and Hrishikesh Hirway. In each episode, Manson interviewed a guest musician about a defining song that represented a breakthrough in the artist's own career and “the moments in an artist’s career where they decide to take a leap into something new.” Three seasons of the podcast were produced, for a total of 28 episodes. Discussing the future of the podcast, Manson is unsure whether the show will be renewed for a fourth season. Manson credits the show for the personal growth of her as an artist and an interviewer. Some episodes of the show also directly inspired the writing and production of songs of Garbage's seventh studio album, No Gods No Masters.

== Artistry ==
=== Influences ===
Manson's earliest musical memories were of her mother, who sang with a big band when Manson was a child. Manson was exposed to classic jazz records as she grew up and work by Nina Simone, Cher, Peggy Lee and Ella Fitzgerald. One of Manson's earliest musical memories is of ABBA winning the 1974 Eurovision Song Contest and becoming a fan of the group. She was particularly drawn to Anni-Frid Lyngstad as she felt she embodied 'the outsider' and her stage presence made an impression. At 14, she became a fan of Siouxsie and the Banshees albums The Scream and Kaleidoscope, and taught herself how to sing listening to those albums, later stating "many of the songs of those two albums were massive loves of my life". Vocalist Siouxsie Sioux embodied how Manson aspired to be as a teen, and "has remained a touchstone for me throughout my career and is still inspiring to me."

At nineteen, Manson discovered Patti Smith, specifically her Horses album, which made a "strong impact" on her. Manson was inspired to learn guitar by Chrissie Hynde, who is an admirer of Manson, while also appreciating the style of Toyah Willcox and Debbie Harry, whose 2006 Rock and Roll Hall of Fame induction speech was delivered by Manson. The majority of Manson's influences were female musicians; however she also notes David Bowie as an inspiring male musician. Manson also grew up listening to Nick Cave and the Bad Seeds, Frank Sinatra, The Clash, The Sugarcubes, Cocteau Twins, Iggy and the Stooges, Echo & the Bunnymen, and The Velvet Underground. For acting, she cites actress Glenn Close and former British Prime Minister Margaret Thatcher as influences for her Terminator: The Sarah Connor Chronicles performance.

=== Style and lyrics ===
Manson, with Garbage, has an alternative musical style fusing various genres including electronic rock, industrial rock, punk, grunge, trip hop and shoegaze. Her lyrics deal with darker themes, often in a mocking manner. She credits this to her Scottish psyche that leads to a preference for depressing themes, and the fact she always felt like an outsider, even within Garbage – "I'm the odd one out by default. I'm the only girl, I'm younger than they are, they've all known each other for 40 years, or something crazy like that. So I always felt, like, off the centre of things." Since the early 2000s, Manson has delved into both her personal experiences and political themes.

=== Voice ===
"We wanted to work with a female vocalist who didn't have a high, chirpy, quality to her voice, we had discussed who we really respect, and names like Patti Smith and Chrissie Hynde came up. And Shirley had some of the same depth."

— Steve Marker discussing Manson's voice in an interview with the Los Angeles Times.

Although trained as a soprano when singing in the choir as a child, Manson never identified as one, saying "I don’t think I’m a soprano. I don’t know what the hell I am." Critics agree she possesses a contralto vocal range, which has been noted for its distinctive qualities as well as her emotive delivery. Elysa Gardner of the Los Angeles Times stated "one of Garbage's most compelling features is a force of nature: Manson's vocals, which can convey a multitude of emotions without ever coming across as melodramatic".

"We wanted someone who could sing in an understated way, at the moment, a lot of these alterna-rock singers have a tendency to scream. Shirley is just the opposite. By using understatement, she can sound even more subversive."

— Butch Vig describing Manson's voice in the Los Angeles Times interview.

Reviewing a live Garbage performance in 1995, Jon Pareles of The New York Times commented, "Temptress, lover, sufferer, scrapper – those have been Ms. Manson's personae since Garbage started in 1995. In other eras she might have been a pop torch singer, a soul belter or a new-wave frontwoman: a Shirley Bassey, a Dusty Springfield, or a Chrissie Hynde. There's a little of each of them in her voice" also stating "In the course of each song she let her voice rise in anger, contempt or passion". Green Left Weekly, in a review of Garbage, remarked that Manson "vocalist and guitarist, has a powerful voice, which soars and dips like a bird. It can plead or demand. It can sound dreamy or psychotic."

Reviewing a 2012 live Garbage performance, Catherine Gee of The Daily Telegraph noted that Manson "remains a striking performer whose distinctive contralto snarl can still raise the hairs on the back of your neck." In 2013 reviews of Garbage, Stephen Thomas Erlewine of AllMusic described Manson's voice as "thin and airy", whilst Mike Diver of the BBC stated Manson owned "a snarl in her voice but [was] equally capable of a purr to melt away any resistance." also adding "even at her most vulnerable, Manson maintains her controlling condition".

== Public image and impact ==
Manson has been credited with inspiring later female artists; including Amy Lee, Florence Welch, Taylor Momsen, Liz Anjos of RAC and The Pragmatic, Screaming Females' Marissa Paternoster, Dee Dee Penny of Dum Dum Girls, Skylar Grey, Paramore's Hayley Williams, Ritzy Bryan (lead singer and guitarist of The Joy Formidable), Katy Perry, Lady Gaga, Potty Mouth's Ally Einbinder, Billie Eilish, Peaches, Radiator Hospital's Cynthia Schemmer, The Great Wilderness' Paola Rogue, Marina and the Diamonds, and Lana Del Rey. Manson is also considered a style icon, influencing various other female artists, and inspiring fashion designers and stylists. She identifies as a feminist and has been hailed as a feminist icon.

== Personal life ==
Manson was married to Scottish artist Eddie Farrell from 1996 to 2003. In 2008, she became engaged to record producer and Garbage sound engineer Billy Bush. They were married at a Los Angeles courthouse in May 2010. They reside in Hollywood Hills, Los Angeles, while Manson maintains a second home in the Edinburgh suburb of Joppa. For the majority of her career, Manson commuted between her home city of Edinburgh and the United States to record with Garbage, which was originally formed in Madison, Wisconsin.

Manson has distanced herself from organized religion but has long been interested in spirituality. She recalled that when she was young she "very besotted with the church ... I loved the theatre of it and I got very involved in all the stories we were taught." At age 12, she had an argument with her father at the dinner table, screaming at him, "Religion's a sham and I'm not going to church anymore, it's just bullshit." She stopped going to church but continued to have theological debates with him every Sunday. Although she maintained an interest in spirituality, she complained that she "brushed up against too many examples of hypocritical spiritualists".

Manson has also adopted a rescue dog, a terrier-mix named Veela, named after the veelas from the Harry Potter books.

=== Health ===
Manson is asthmatic. She quit smoking in the early 1990s, when she was around the age of 25. In 1998, she had a benign tumor removed from her breast. After the surgery, which she said was "really botched" and left her "in a lot of pain", she kept on touring wearing a sling.

During the Beautiful Garbage tour, Manson started having trouble with her voice, losing her voice completely at the Roskilde Festival in Denmark, on 30 June 2002: "I got on stage and opened my mouth to sing, and about 30 seconds in, there was no voice at all. It was a fucking nightmare," she recounted in 2005. Believing it was due to fatigue or stress, she kept on touring until singer Gwen Stefani pointed her towards a vocal specialist, who diagnosed her with a large cyst on one of her vocal cords, which "was also causing considerable damage to the vocal cord opposite." A specialist informed Manson the operation could permanently damage her singing ability, so initially she desisted. She underwent surgery in 2003 after seeing another doctor in New York and recuperated her voice after three weeks of rehabilitation, including a week of total silence. Manson described the experience as "torture": "speech is my absolute lifeline and I felt like I'd lost my personality, been stripped completely of me... I felt invisible," she explained.

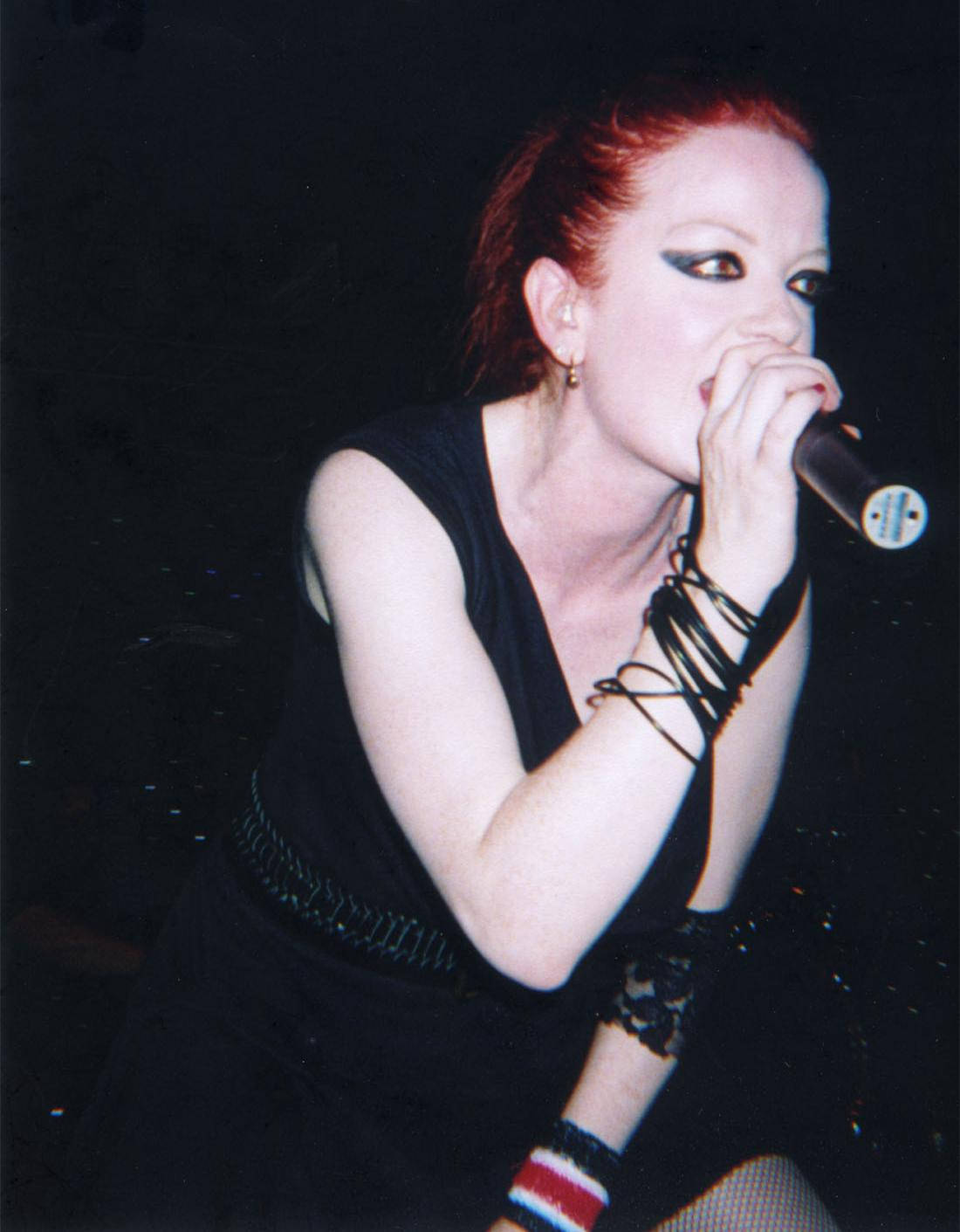
Manson performing in 2005.

Whilst performing on stage during Garbage's tour for Strange Little Birds, Manson fell off the stage into the pit at KROQ Weenie Roast on 14 May 2016. She immediately stood back up and continued performing for the rest of the show. In November 2022, she said she injured her right hip in the incident, causing her "so much pain" and requiring hip replacement surgery in January 2023.

Manson has spoken publicly on several occasions about experiencing body dysmorphic disorder and depression, exacerbated by the media scrutiny and misogyny she encountered during Garbage's breakthrough years. She received psychiatric help on the advice of her trainer during the making of Garbage's third album Beautiful Garbage whilst also going through a divorce, a time when she was admittedly "crying literally for like four hours in the bathtub every night." She said the psychiatrist she went to "saved [her] life" and taught her "how to turn all the noise down and allow a healthier voice to emerge. Start to make sense of the world and start to control how you respond to it."

Manson has admitted she has learnt to manage her struggles with time, saying "it's a constant dialogue, and you just learn to be more powerful than that other voice." She also credited her 1999 photo shoot without makeup for Calvin Klein with having helped considerably in facing her own perception of herself. "If everyone had seen me with no make-up on, there was nothing to hide. And, I like the photograph. I looked...sweet. I actually wrote to Calvin Klein telling him that he'd done something incredible for me".

Manson has spoken of her aversion to cosmetic surgery, stating that it wouldn't solve her body dysmorphia: "I know that even if I did get something fixed it is not going to last very long and I am still going to be back to square one, and I'm going to have to face myself in the morning", she said in 2008. She also added "I don't want to set an example for the younger generation of women who come up and think they have to fix their faces. I don't want to pass that on to other girls. I don't want to be responsible for that."

Manson has also spoken about struggling with self-harm. In 2018, she wrote an article about this for The New York Times called "The First Time I Cut Myself", in which she detailed this experience when she was thirteen years old whilst in an unhealthy relationship. She said the self-harming lasted up until she was fifteen, and although she felt the impulse to cut again during the Version 2.0 tour due to the media pressure, she resisted the urge. Manson admitted not knowing the reason behind her self-harming, "but I'm sure there was a lot of unexpressed anger, a lot of hormones, and a lot of emotions that I was unable to process as a young person", she explained.

== Discography ==
With Garbage

- Garbage (1995)
- Version 2.0 (1998)
- Beautiful Garbage (2001)
- Bleed Like Me (2005)
- Not Your Kind of People (2012)
- Strange Little Birds (2016)
- No Gods No Masters (2021)
- Let All That We Imagine Be the Light (2025)

With Goodbye Mr Mackenzie

- Good Deeds and Dirty Rags (1989)
- Hammer and Tongs (1991)
- Five (1994)

With Angelfish

- Angelfish (1994)

== Filmography ==
Year	Title	Role	Notes
1986	Monster Beach Party	Debbie Danco	Unfinished project; footage archived
2008–2009	Terminator: The Sarah Connor Chronicles	Catherine Weaver (T-1001)	17 episodes
2009	Guitar Hero 5	Herself	Playable character for Garbage song "Only Happy When It Rains"
2010	Pancake Mountain	Herself	Segment: "Around the World with Shirley Manson"
2012	Knife Fight	Nicole	
