= Face to Face (Goodbye Mr. Mackenzie song) =

Single by Goodbye Mr Mackenzie
- Released: 2 October 1987
- Recorded: Edinburgh, Scotland
- Genre: Alternative rock, new wave
- Length: 3:28
- Label: Clandestine
- Songwriter(s): Metcalfe
- Producer(s): Terry Adams

Goodbye Mr Mackenzie singles chronology
"The Rattler" (1986)	"Face to Face" (1987)	"Goodbye Mr. Mackenzie" (1988)

"Face to Face" is a 1987 single released by Scottish alternative rock group Goodbye Mr Mackenzie. It was their third independent single release, and their last before signing a major label deal with EMI's Capitol Records.

Inspired by a rape case during the 1980s, where the victim was accused of "contributory negligence" by the trial judge, all profits made from the sales of "Face to Face" were donated to Rape Crisis.

In 1989, "Face to Face" was included on the band's rarities compilation album Fish Heads and Tails; and in 1999, it was remastered and included on a re-issue of the band's debut album Good Deeds and Dirty Rags.

== Track listings ==
- UK 12" single Clandestine MACK1
1. "Face to Face" (Metcalfe) - 3:28
2. "Secrets" (Kelly/Metcalfe/Scobie/Baldwin) - 4:00
3. "Good Deeds" (Kelly/Metcalfe) - 6:34

== Charts ==
Year	Chart	Position
1987	UK Indie Chart (CIN)	27
