= Goodbye Mr. Mackenzie (song) =

Single by Goodbye Mr Mackenzie

from the album Good Deeds and Dirty Rags
- Released: August 1988
- Recorded: Edinburgh, Scotland
- Genre: Alternative rock, new wave
- Length: 3:26
- Label: Capitol
- Songwriter(s): Derek Kelly, Martin Metcalfe
- Producer(s): Kevin Moloney; Engineered by Terry Adams; Add. production & mix by Mack

Goodbye Mr Mackenzie singles chronology
"Face to Face" (1987)	"Goodbye Mr. Mackenzie" (1988)	"Open Your Arms" (1988)

Goodbye Mr. Mackenzie is a 1988 single by Scottish alternative rock group Goodbye Mr Mackenzie. It was their debut major label single, recorded for EMI's Capitol Records, following a string of well-received independent releases. Supported by the band performing the single live on national music show The Tube, "Goodbye Mr. Mackenzie" was the band's first single to reach the Top 75 of the UK Singles chart, when it peaked at #62 on its third week of release. The music video was directed by John Scarlett-Davis and produced by Nick Verden for Radar Films.

"Goodbye Mr. Mackenzie" later featured on the band's debut album Good Deeds and Dirty Rags which was released the following year. In 1991, after Goodbye Mr Mackenzie had signed to Gary Kurfirst's Radioactive Records, "Goodbye Mr. Mackenzie" was remixed and featured on their debut international album release, also titled Goodbye Mr. Mackenzie.

== Track listings ==
- UK 7" single Capitol Records CL 501
1. "Goodbye Mr. Mackenzie" - 3:26
2. "Green Turn Red" - 3:52
- UK 12" single Capitol Records 12CL 501
- UK 12" single Capitol Records 12CLG 501 (Gatefold sleeve)
1. "Goodbye Mr. Mackenzie" - 3:26
2. "Green Turn Red" - 3:52
3. "Stars and Bars" - 3:27
- UK CD single Capitol Records CDCL 501
1. "Goodbye Mr. Mackenzie" - 3:26
2. "Green Turn Red" - 3:52
3. "Knockin' On Joe" - 6:19 (Nick Cave)
4. "Stars and Bars" - 3:27

== Credits ==
- Artwork By [Sleeve Design Assistant] - Andrew Biscomb
- Artwork By [Sleeve Design] - Peter Barrett
- Bass - Fin*
- Drums - Kelly*
- Engineer [Overdubs] - Terry Adams (tracks: A)
- Guitar - John Duncan*
- Keyboards, Vocals - Rona Scobie, Shirley Manson
- Photography – Douglas Brothers, The (World Travel)
- Producer – Kevin Moloney (tracks: A), Terry Adams (tracks: B1, B2)
- Producer [Additional], Mixed by - Mack (2) (tracks: A)
- Vocals - Martin Metcalfe
- Written-By - Mackenzies, The* (tracks: A, B1)

== Comprehensive charts ==
Year	Single	Chart	Position
1988	"Goodbye Mr. Mackenzie"	UK CIN Singles Chart	#62
