= Goodbye Mr Mackenzie =

Scottish rock band

- Left to right: John Duncan, Fin Wilson, Rona Scobie, Martin Metcalfe, Shirley Manson, Derek Kelly

Background information
- Origin: Bathgate, Scotland
- Genres: Alternative rock, indie rock
- Years active: 1981–1996, 2019–present
- Labels: Capitol; Parlophone; Radioactive; Blokshok
- Spinoffs: Angelfish; Garbage; The Filthy Tongues
- Members: Martin Metcalfe; Big John Duncan; Derek Kelly; Rona Scobie; Fin Wilson
- Past members: Shirley Manson

Goodbye Mr Mackenzie is a Scottish rock band formed in Bathgate near Edinburgh. At the band's commercial peak, the line-up consisted of Martin Metcalfe on vocals, John Duncan on guitar, Fin Wilson on bass guitar, Shirley Manson and Rona Scobie on keyboards and backing vocals, and Derek Kelly on drums.

The band came to prominence in the early 1980s after releasing two independent label singles, and were signed to Capitol Records. They charted in the United Kingdom with their debut album, Good Deeds and Dirty Rags and single release "The Rattler", but the band were hindered by record company conflicts and failed to break through outside the UK. The band split up in 1993, leaving Manson, Metcalfe, Wilson and Kelly to form Angelfish to continue recording music. Manson left for Garbage in 1994, and Goodbye Mr Mackenzie played their final live show at the end of 1995.

In 2019, Goodbye Mr Mackenzie reformed and embarked on a tour of Scotland. Manson did not join her former bandmates due to work commitments with Garbage. Metcalfe claimed that the band had asked Manson to join them on the tour, claiming that "people do not realise how busy she is". That same year, they re–issued Good Deeds and Dirty Rags, and in 2024, re–released their third album Five, which debuted at number five on the albums charts in Scotland.

== Career ==
=== Early career (1984–1987) ===
The band began when Martin Metcalfe moved on from his first band Teenage Dog Orgy in 1984. They were named after author Jean Rhys's 1931 novel After Leaving Mr. Mackenzie.

Their first single was released through a pilot music industry course run by Bathgate College under the Youth Training Scheme, a split-single 7-inch format of "Death of a Salesman" in 1984. Limited to 1,000 copies, and with a track by Lindy Bergman on the flipside, it quickly sold out. Shortly after, they signed a management deal with Precious Organisation, who had just launched another Scottish group, Wet Wet Wet. Precious managed to include both groups on Honey at the Core, a 1986 compilation of up and coming Scottish acts compiled by Glasgow Herald journalist John Williamson, and released the band's first commercial single "The Rattler". The single suffered from a lack of distribution, but received airplay on Radio One and Radio Clyde. A video shot by Clyde Cable Vision for "Blip" on their Glasgow Channel was broadcast on The Chart Show. The band also performed "The Rattler" on The Tube. Precious organised an A&R showcase in Glasgow but, as the band did not receive any interest from the labels invited, they chose to leave Precious.

=== Commercially successful period (1987–1994) ===
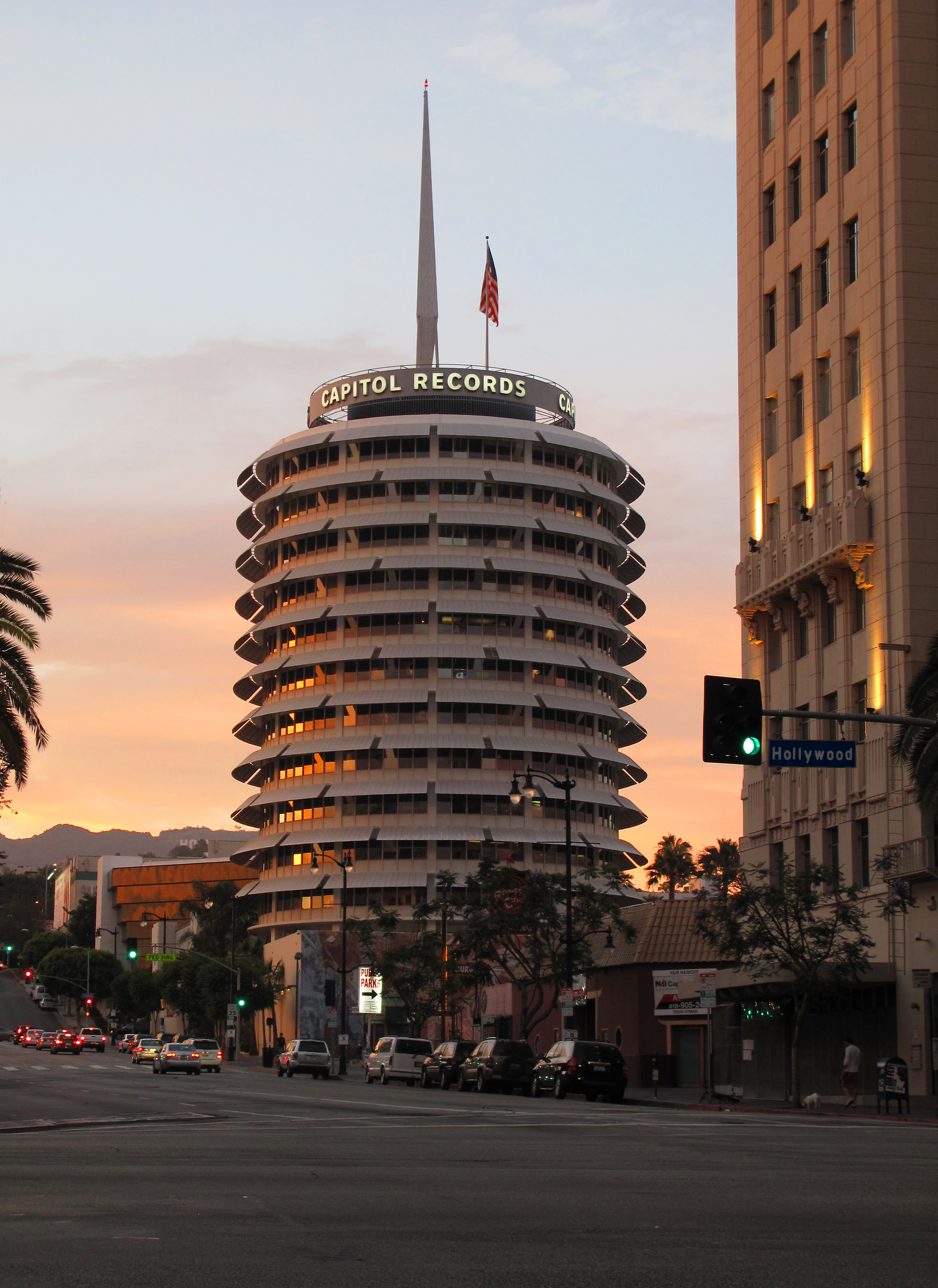
The band signed their first major label contract with Capitol Records

After leaving their management, they released an independent 12-inch single, "Face to Face", in 1987, and signed a major label record deal with Capitol Records. Shortly afterwards Big John Duncan, formerly of The Exploited, joined on guitar. Capitol issued three multi-formatted singles, of which a re-release of "The Rattler" was the most successful, charting at No. 37 in 1989. The label followed up the band's chart debut with Good Deeds and Dirty Rags, which reached No. 23 on the UK Albums Chart. A further single from the album, "Goodwill City", reversed the band's upward trend, stalling at No. 49. Capitol ended the year by releasing Fish Heads and Tails, a mid-price live and B-side compilation, while the band relocated to studios in Berlin to record their second album. While at the studios, the band witnessed the Fall of the Berlin Wall.

The following year, the band were transferred sideways across EMI, from Capitol to Parlophone, who released two new recordings "Love Child" and "Blacker Than Black" (the latter being released across Europe and in North America) as taster singles. Both tracks failed to gain on the chart position set by "The Rattler" a year prior, and in response Parlophone cancelled the planned album release for the group's second set, titled Hammer and Tongs. The band continued to tour heavily, became radio mainstays on Scottish radio and performed at the televised concert "The Big Day" on Glasgow Green.

Gary Kurfirst, who managed Talking Heads and Debbie Harry, bought the band's contract from Parlophone and signed them to his own label, Radioactive, a subsidiary of MCA. Radioactive were keen to release the band's second album, but required a chart friendly track. They completed recording "Now We Are Married", in Edinburgh, and Radioactive issued it as a single ahead of Hammer and Tongs. Both releases again failed to chart, and the group were persuaded to leave the label by their management. Radioactive meanwhile released a compilation of the band's two albums self-titled as Goodbye Mr. Mackenzie in North America, Europe, Australia and Japan.

The band continued to write material; Manson was also given the opportunity to record lead vocals on a number of tracks planned for the band's third album, titled Five. In the end, Manson only featured on a duet, "Normal Boy". The band issued the album on their own record label, Blokshok, following their split from Capitol Records, something later described as "reflecting troubled times – both professionally and personally – for the band". Five was described as a shift from the "radio friendly first two albums released on major labels", featuring a more "rougher edge". Recorded as the same time as the debut album from their side project, Five has been acknowledged as "more than worthy of it's [sic] place in Scottish music history".

=== Angelfish and disbandment (1994) ===
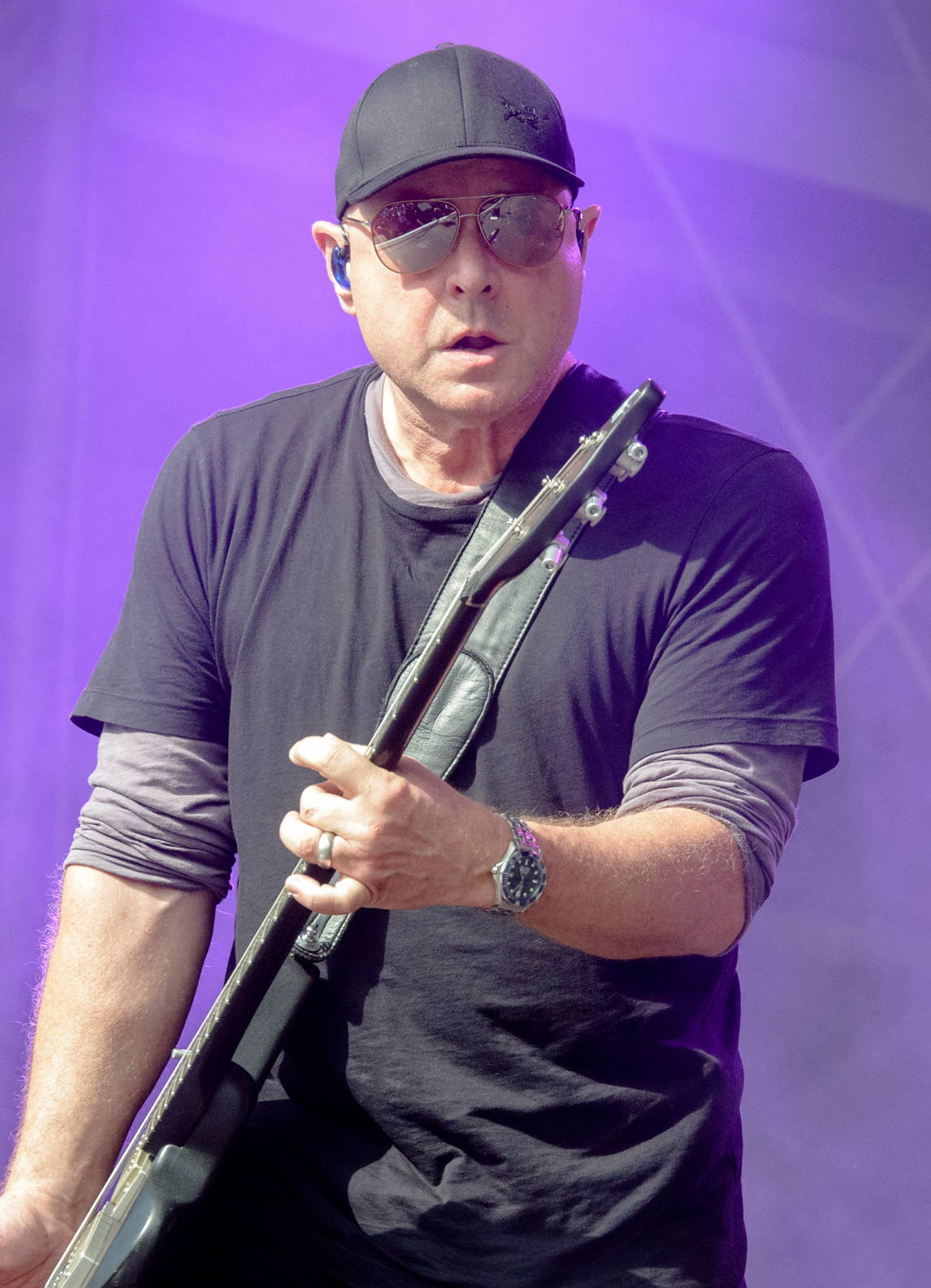
"Suffocate Me" by Angelfish was viewed by Steve Marker (pictured), which ultimately lead to Manson joining Garbage in 1994

With relations between MCA and the band's management hitting a low point, the band left MCA. Gary Kurfirst wanted to keep working with the band and suggested they record a whole album with Shirley Manson on lead vocals. After hearing several demos, Kurfirst signed Manson to Radioactive as a solo artist, with Metcalfe, Kelly and Wilson signing the publishing deal. Recording under the name Angelfish, and using some of the newly written material and a previously released Mackenzie B-side, Manson and the group recorded the tracks that would make up the Angelfish album in Connecticut with Talking Heads' Chris Frantz and Tina Weymouth. A lead in track "Suffocate Me" sent to college radio where it was well received. Angelfish and second single "Heartbreak to Hate" followed in 1994. Angelfish toured the United States, Canada, France, Belgium, and co-supported Live on a tour of North America, along with Vic Chesnutt.

The music video for "Suffocate Me" was aired on MTV's 120 Minutes. Producer and musician Steve Marker saw the broadcast and thought Manson would be a great singer for his band, Garbage, which also featured producers Duke Erikson and Butch Vig. Manson left Angelfish, and The Mackenzies, to join the group in 1994. Derek Kelly, Fin Wilson and Martin Metcalfe formed a new band, Isa & the Filthy Tongues, with American singer Stacey Chavis.

=== Reformation (2019–present) ===
In an interview with the Edinburgh Evening News on 4 April 2019, Martin Metcalfe announced that Goodbye Mr Mackenzie would be reforming and would be performing a mini Scottish Tour. Warm up gigs were performed in Dundee on 17 May and Dunfermline on 18 May, followed by full shows in Glasgow at The Garage (venue of their farewell concert) on 22 May, Aberdeen Lemon Tree on 23 May and Edinburgh Liquid Rooms on 25 and 26 May 2019. These shows were followed up by a winter tour of the UK, culminating in a sold-out performance at the Glasgow Barrowlands on 20 December.

During interviews to promote their tour, Metcalfe revealed that a number of hurdles had to be overcome to reunite the band, including Duncan's multiple sclerosis and the fact that Scobie had not played keyboard in over 20 years. He described Duncan's ability to relearn his guitar parts in spite of his ongoing health concerns as "something of a miracle". A documentary about the reunion entitled Until the End of the Road was released in 2020.

A live album entitled A Night in the Windy City was released in February 2021 and featured their 2019 performance at the Glasgow Barrowlands.

In April 2024, the band announced six more concerts in October to celebrate the 30th anniversary of their third album, Five. The same month, the album was remastered and reissued. On 7 November 2024, Five debuted at number five on the Scottish Albums Charts, giving the band their first entry on the national albums chart in Scotland, and on 1 December 2024, Five was released digitally.

== Artistry ==
=== Image and reputation ===
The band were accredited as being "one of Scotland's greatest bands" during an interview with NARC Magazine. On that accolade, lead singer Martin Metcalfe claimed that "Scotland is always a bit of an Aladdin’s cave even today with the internet". During their career, they worked with bands such as Talking Heads and supported Blondie during their 1990 tour. Metcalfe described their initial tenure as "like a family", claiming that "we made each other laugh and got on our own last nerves", and despite disputes in the band "there is always a bond, and there will always be a strange kind of love there with shared fun & pain".

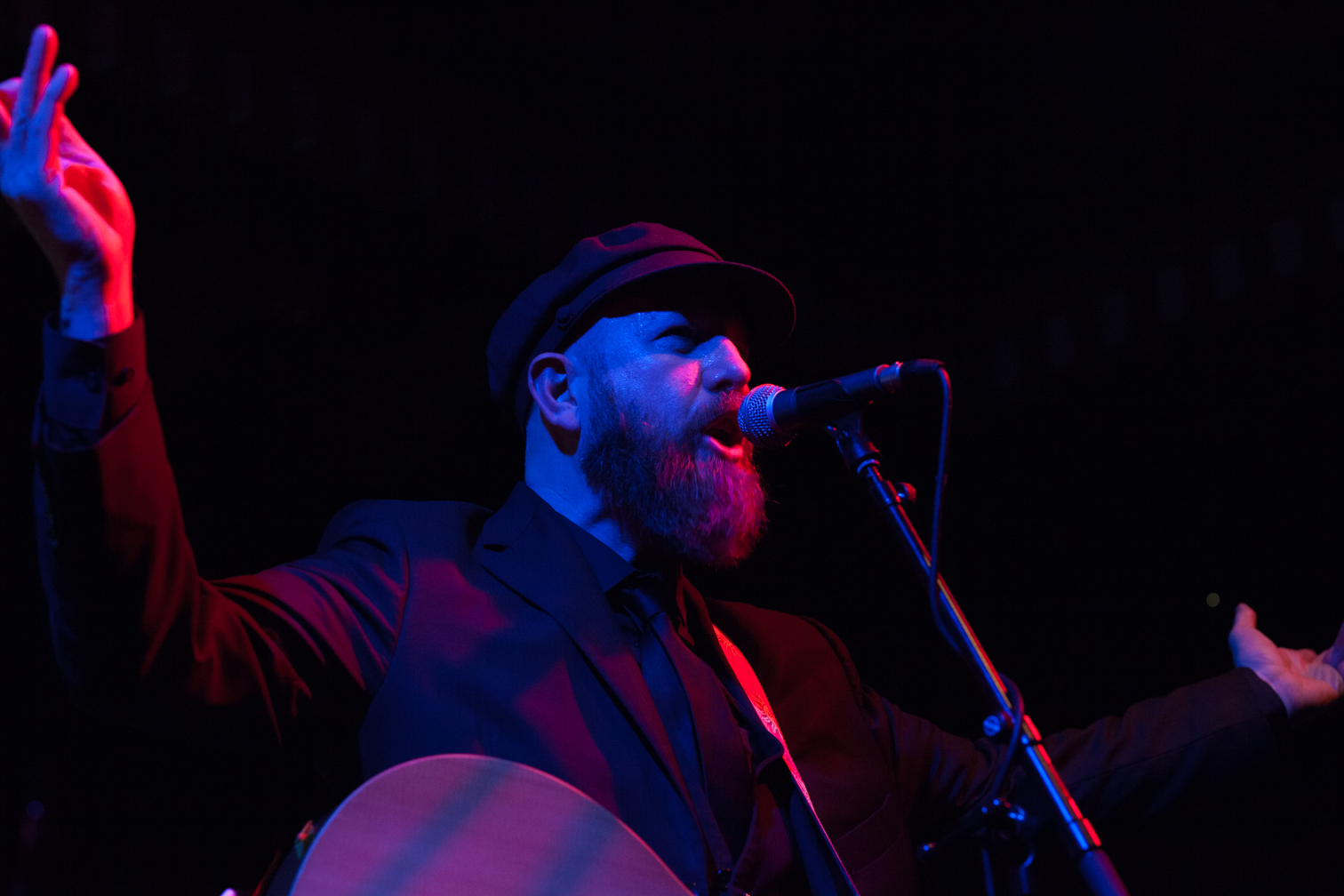
Martin Metcalfe performing with The Filthy Tongues in 2018

Speaking to Edinburgh News in 2022, former member Shirley Manson stated that during her ten-year tenure in the band she "received the most spectacular education that I could possibly have ever hoped for in the world of rock and roll", further stating she and her band members were "living the life" during a "very rebellious, decadent unit". Metcalfe claimed that much of their debut album, Good Deeds and Dirty Rags, "looked at the psychology behind politics and states of mind", comments he made ahead of the re–release of the album in 2019, claiming that "in those terms the lyrical content can never be dated". Lyrically, the album was described as "seeing inside the mind of a psychopath", with the persona of the album "confused and hurt and the messages he’s getting from society are exacerbating his damage".

=== Legacy ===
In a feature on The List's "50 Greatest Scottish Bands" piece, they stated that Goodbye Mr Mackenzie "left behind the most complex and fascinating footprint of any Scottish band, and live, they were stunning". They further added that lead singer Martin Metcalfe "looked like the MC of a particularly debauched cabaret troupe", whilst their "Scottish counterparts were looking at soul and Steely Dan for inspiration the MacKenzies were taking theirs from the Pixies and the Birthday Party".

Following their disbandment, members Derek Kelly, Fin Wilson and Martin Metcalfe formed The Filthy Tongues and regularly performed Goodbye Mr Mackenzie songs during live performances. Following a brief tenure fronting the Angelfish side project, Manson joined American rock band Garbage in 1994.

== Discography ==
=== Studio albums ===
List of studio albums, with selected chart positions, sales figures and certifications
Title	Details	Peak chart positions				Sales
Title	Details	UK	SCO	UK Phys	UK Ind	Sales
Good Deeds and Dirty Rags	Released: 10 April 1989; Label: Capitol Records; Formats: LP, cassette	26	–	–	–	
Hammer and Tongs	Released: 4 March 1991; Label: Radioactive Records, MCA; Formats: LP, cassette	61	–	–	–	
Five	Released: 1994; Label: Blokshok Records; Formats: CD, LP, cassette	–	5	37	15	
The Glory Hole	Released: 1996; Label: Blokshok Records; Formats: CD, LP, cassette	–	–	–	–	

=== Compilation albums ===
Title	Details
Fish Heads and Tails	Released: 1989; Label: Capitol Records; Format: LP, cassette
Goodbye Mr Mackenzie	Released: 1991; Label: Radioactive Records / MCA Records; Format: LP, cassette
Jezebel	Released: 1995; Label: Blokshok Records; Format: LP, cassette

=== Live albums ===
Title	Details
Live on the Day of Storms	Released: 1993; Label: Blokshok Records; Format: CD, LP, cassette
The River Sessions	Released: 2005; Label: River Records; Format: CD, digital download
The Rattler: Live '91	Released: 2009; Label: MD Music Company; Format: Digital download

=== Singles ===
Year	Title	Peak chart positions		Album
Year	Title	UK	UK Ind	Album
1984	"Death of a Salesman"	—	—	Non–album singles
1986	"The Rattler"	–	8	Non–album singles
1987	"Face to Face"	–	27	Non–album singles
1988	"Goodbye Mr. Mackenzie"	62	—	Good Deeds and Dirty Rags
1988	"Open Your Arms"	92	—	Good Deeds and Dirty Rags
1989	"The Rattler" (re-release)	37	—	Good Deeds and Dirty Rags
1989	"Goodwill City"/"I'm Sick of You"	49	—	Good Deeds and Dirty Rags
1990	"Love Child"	52	—	Hammer and Tongs
1990	"Blacker Than Black"	61	—	Hammer and Tongs
1991	"Now We Are Married"	80	—	Hammer and Tongs
1993	Goodwill City (live, EP)	—	—	Live on the Day of Storms
1993	Hard E.P.	—	—	Five
1994	The Way I Walk (EP)	—	—	Five

An early track, "Skimming Stones", appeared on the 1986 compilation cassette Honey at the Core.
