= Five (Goodbye Mr Mackenzie album) =

Studio album by Goodbye Mr Mackenzie
- Released: 1994
- Recorded: 1993–1994
- Genre: Alternative rock, college rock
- Length: 38:20
- Label: Blokshok Records

Goodbye Mr Mackenzie chronology
Hammer and Tongs (1991)	Five (1994)	The Glory Hole (1996)

Professional ratings
Review scores
Source	Rating
Allmusic	(not rated, no review)

Five is the third album from the Scottish group Goodbye Mr Mackenzie and was self-released in 1994 by the band on their own label Blokshok Records. It has a rougher edge to it than their two previous major label albums, partly due to Martin Metcalfe being inspired by grunge music and The Pixies. The album was supported by the extended play release of "Hard" as a single. Five failed to revive interest outside of the band’s existing fanbase. Metcalfe later explained: "We turned to a harder sound and radio wasn’t prepared to play it".

The songs that make up Five and the songs that were recorded for side-project Angelfish's debut album were written at the same time. The original plan for the record was to have Shirley Manson's vocals more prominent to give her better status in the band, but in the end only "Normal Boy" featured Manson's vocal prominently and it proved to be Manson's last album with the band as she would join Garbage not long after the album's release. An unreleased duet with Metcalfe titled "Carnival Is Over" was recorded, but went unreleased. Some of the influences on the writing and recording of Five include Metcalfe's obsession with the Marilyn Monroe film noir Niagara (on "Niagara").

The album was reissued in 2024 on the Past Night From Glasgow label with three extra tracks, Zoo, Louise and Mad Cow Disease.

== Track listing ==
All tracks by Derek Kelly and Martin Metcalfe.

1. "Hard"
2. "Bam Bam"
3. "Grip"
4. "Jim's Killer"
5. "Niagara"
6. "Touch the Bullseye"
7. "Day of Storms"
8. "Yelloueze"
9. "Bugdive"
10. "Normal Boy"
11. "Hands of the Receiver"
12. "Titanic"
