= Good Deeds and Dirty Rags =

Studio album by Goodbye Mr Mackenzie
- Released: 10 April 1989
- Recorded: Munich, West Germany/ Edinburgh, Scotland
- Studio: Musicland, Munich, Germany
- Genre: Rock
- Length: 1:06:56
- Label: Capitol
- Producer: Mack "Wake It Up" by Terry Adams

Goodbye Mr Mackenzie chronology
Good Deeds and Dirty Rags (1989)	Hammer and Tongs (1991)

Singles from Good Deeds and Dirty Rags
- 1. "Goodbye Mr. Mackenzie" Released: August 1988; 2. "Open Your Arms" Released: November 1988; 3. "The Rattler" Released: 27 February 1989; 4. "Goodwill City" Released: July 1989

Good Deeds and Dirty Rags is the debut album by the Scottish rock band Goodbye Mr Mackenzie, released on 10 April 1989 by Capitol Records. Following single releases on independent record labels, the band signed with Capitol and released their first major label single release "Goodbye Mr. Mackenzie" in August 1988 as the lead single from the album. Further singles – "Open Your Arms" and a re–release of "The Rattler" proved commercially successful for the band in the United Kingdom, whilst the album debuted at number twenty-six in the United Kingdom.

After facing some difficulty to obtain the rights to re–issue the album, it was re–released in 2019 to celebrate thirty years since its initial release, with the band beginning a tour to commemorate the albums release.

== Background ==
After several early members of the band had left, Martin and drummer Kelly were left to continue with the band and were still unsure of which direction to take. The final line up of the band was cemented when Martin, Parker and Kelly were joined by Hilary McLean, Shirley Manson and Rona Scobie. McLean decided to leave the band, however, they discovered that Manson could play piano and "re-configured the line-up to have one backing vocalist and two keyboards to cover all the samples, some of which were just noises, explosions and orchestra stabs". Additional session guitarists were brought in for the album recording sessions to allow lead singer Martin Metcalfe more "freedom to move about" whilst singing, as he had previously been stood idle playing guitar. Following signing their first recording contract, the band were joined by Big John Duncan and Fin Wilson.

Two songs included on the album, "Good Deeds" and "Goodwill City" feature rants at the end, with both rants being based on the "received false knowledge of the era". Other songs on the album are described as "looking at the rise of the Christian right in the United States and how the media pay their bills by exploiting tragedy". Prior to the re–issue of the album in 2019, lead singer Martin Metcalfe claimed that "much of the album is still relevant", further citing that "this stuff is still happening now and we live in scary times and the apocalyptic landscape seems to reflect that".

== Release ==
To promote the release of the album, "Goodbye Mr. Mackenzie" was released as the lead single in August 1988 and their first release on a major label, following a number of releases on independent record labels. The release of the single was supported by the band performing the single live on national music show The Tube, "Goodbye Mr. Mackenzie" was the band's first single to reach the Top 75 of the UK Singles chart, when it peaked at #62 on its third week of release. A second single was released prior to the album, "Open Your Arms", released on 31 October 1988, which debuted at #92 on the UK Singles Charts.

The third single, "The Rattler", had previously been released by the band in October 1986 on the independent record label The Precious Organisation. Following its original release in 1986, the single reached #8 on the UK Indie Chart. It was rereleased in February 1989 by Capitol Records, and with considerable promotion, it reached the official UK Singles Charts, peaking at #37, becoming their first UK Top 40 single in which it spent six weeks within the UK Top 100. "Goodwill City" was released as the fourth and final single from the album and served as a double single release alongside "I'm Sick of You". The single reached #49 on the UK Singles Charts.

Good Deeds and Dirty Rags was released in April 1989 and debuted at #26 on the UK Albums Charts, spending a combined total of three weeks within the UK Top 100. It was re–released in 2019 to celebrate its 30th anniversary of release, with lead singer Martin Metcalfe claiming the re–release of the album "was as big a surprise to us as anyone". The band initially had difficulties obtaining the rights to re–issue the album, however, it was later "protracted" allowing the band to re–release the album. Ahead of the re–release, they released "The Rattler" on digital download format only. The song was described as a reminder of how "clever, upbeat, and catchy their music is, capturing the spirit of that era and ultimately reflecting a high point for this tasteful and inimitable band".

== Reception ==
Professional ratings
Review scores
Source	Rating
AllMusic	4.5/5 stars

Steve Aldrich of AllMusic called the album an "excellent debut" that "draws from Bowie, Scott Walker-influences, yet maintains its own identity." Following the release of the album, the band were said to have increased their fan base, with a significant fan following in Scotland, partly credited to an increase in successful chart singles such as "The Rattler" and live show performances which were both credited "further cementing the band in a fond place in many hearts".

== Legacy ==
Lead singer Martin Metcalfe described the release of Good Deeds and Dirty Rags as a "defining moment", stating that when the album was released "any musician who managed to have a proper album released felt they’d arrived in one way or another". He attributed the albums relatively strong charting position on the United Kingdom's albums charts as "another life landmark and I suppose would have cemented the ‘arrived’ metaphor if we’d managed to keep performing at that level". The moderate success of the album created opportunities for the band to tour both Europe and the United States. It was during their tour in the United States some years later that they began working with musicians for what would later becoming Angelfish which was released as the side project to Goodbye Mr Mackenzie with Shirley Manson on vocals rather than Metcalfe.

To commemorate thirty years since its release, the band (without Manson) began a tour across Scotland performing songs specifically from the album. Metcalfe claimed that Good Deeds and Dirty Rags "kicked everything off" for the band, and that "it deserves a bit of thanks which is what it’s been getting with the tour". He claimed that he was initially sceptical about revisiting the album, adding that musically the band "moved on from 80’s subversive pop/rock, and as a creative person it’s hard not to be critical of your own work but in the end, we realised that the songs were really well crafted".

== Track listing ==
All tracks by Kelly/Metcalfe, except where noted.

=== Original release ===
The track listing for the original release of Good Deeds and Dirty Rags

1. "Open Your Arms" – 4:20
2. "Wake It Up" – 3:43 (Kelly, Metcalfe, Baldwin)
3. "His Masters Voice" – 3:22
4. "Goodwill City" – 4:47
5. "Candlestick Park" – 5:20
6. "Goodbye Mr Mackenzie" – 3:26
7. "The Rattler" – 4:01
8. "Dust" – 3:32
9. "You Generous Thing You" – 4:03 (Kelly, Metcalfe, Scobie)
10. "Good Deeds" – 6:40 (Kelly, Metcalfe, Baldwin, Scobie)

CD bonus tracks

11. "Amsterdam"
12. "Calton Hill"
13. "Secrets"
14. "Knockin' on Joe" (Nick Cave)

LP bonus tracks (on bonus 12")

11. "Strangle"
12. "Extended Strangle"
13. "Secrets" (live)^{2}
14. "Green Turned Red" (live)^{2}

^{2}Recorded live by Radio Clyde at the Pavilion Theatre, Glasgow on 23 November 1988.

== Personnel ==
Goodbye Mr Mackenzie

- Martin Metcalfe – lead vocals
- John Duncan – guitar
- Fin Wilson – bass guitar
- Shirley Manson – keyboards, backing vocals
- Rona Scobie – keyboards, backing vocals
- Derek Kelly – drums

== Credits ==
- Mixed by – Pete Harris* (tracks: D1, D2)
- Producer – Mack (tracks: A1, A3 to A5, B1 to B5), Terry Adams (tracks: A2, C1, C2)

== Chart performance ==
Chart (1989)	Peak position
United Kingdom (OCC)	26
