= Fish Heads and Tails =

Compilation album by Goodbye Mr Mackenzie
- Released: 1989
- Recorded: 1987–1989
- Label: Capitol Records

Goodbye Mr Mackenzie chronology
Good Deeds and Dirty Rags (1989)	Fish Heads and Tails (1989)	Hammer and Tongs (1991)

Professional ratings
Review scores
Source	Rating
Allmusic.com	3/5 stars

Fish Heads and Tails is a compilation album from the Scottish group Goodbye Mr Mackenzie released on 13 November 1989. It includes a selection of live tracks, outtakes and cover versions.

== Track listing ==
=== LP & cassette ===
1. "Amsterdam" (Jacques Brel, Mort Shuman)
2. "Somewhere in China" (The Shop Assistants)
3. "Calton Hill" (Kelly, Metcalfe)
4. "Secrets" (Kelly, Metcalfe)
5. "Face to Face" (Metcalfe)
6. "Sick of You" (James Osterberg, James Williamson)
7. "Green Turn Red" (Kelly, Metcalfe)
8. "Pleasure Search" (Kelly, Metcalfe)
9. "Mystery Train" (Junior Parker, Sam Phillips)
10. "Knockin' on Joe" (Nick Cave)^{1}

=== CD ===
1. "Amsterdam" (Jacques Brel, Mort Shuman)
2. "Somewhere in China" (The Shop Assistants)
3. "Face to Face" (Metcalfe)
4. "Knockin' on Joe" (Nick Cave)^{1}
5. "Sick of You" (James Osterberg, James Williamson)
6. "Green Turn Red" (Kelly, Metcalfe)
7. "Pleasure Search" (Kelly, Metcalfe)
8. "Strangle Your Animal" (Metcalfe)
9. "Mystery Train" (Junior Parker, Sam Phillips)
10. "Here Comes Deacon Brodie" (Kelly, Metcalfe)^{1}

== Personnel ==
- Martin Metcalfe - lead vocals
- John Duncan - guitar
- Fin Wilson - bass guitar
- Shirley Manson - keyboards and backing vocals
- Rona Scobie - keyboards and backing vocals
- Derek Kelly - drums
