= Jeff Castelaz =

Jeff Castelaz founded Cast Management and co-founded The Pablove Foundation. He also Co-Founded and was CEO of Los Angeles-based Dangerbird Records, and was the president of Elektra Records.

== Career beginnings ==
Castelaz began working in music in his hometown of Milwaukee, WI, writing about music for Milwaukee Magazine, the local weekly newspaper Downtown Edition, and the national music magazine Ray Gun. In 1992 he began managing the band Wild Kingdom, which later reformed as Citizen King in 1993. Castelaz went on to help sign the band to MCA Records in 1994, and then to Warner Bros. Records where the band released their hit single "Better Days (And the Bottom Drops Out)" in 1999. By 2000, Castelaz had relocated to Los Angeles, CA and began to work with other artists and music producers before co-founding Dangerbird Records in 2004.

== Pablove foundation ==
The Pablove foundation is a US pediatric cancer nonprofit organization cofounded by Jeff Castelaz, with his now ex-wife Jo Ann Thrailkill, in 2009.

== Elektra Records ==
Castelaz left Dangerbird in September 2012, to become President of Elektra Records.

He stepped down as head of the label in September 2015 to focus on his work with Cast Management and his charitable work. "Running Elektra Records has been a dream come true," Castelaz told Billboard. "Being part of Atlantic Records Group, I've learned so much from Craig [Kallman] and Julie [Greenwald], and will forever count them as business mentors and friends."
