= Angelfish (album) =

Studio album by Angelfish
- Released: 15 February 1994
- Recorded: March 1993
- Studio: The Clubhouse Music Studio, Connecticut, United States
- Genre: Alternative rock
- Length: 35:51
- Label: Radioactive, MCA
- Producer: Chris Frantz; Tina Weymouth

Singles from Angelfish
- 1. "Suffocate Me EP" Released: 8 June 1993; 2. "Heartbreak to Hate" Released: 8 March 1994

Angelfish is the 1994 debut and only studio album released by Scottish alternative rock group Angelfish, fronted by Shirley Manson. The Angelfish album was born out of necessity when Goodbye Mr Mackenzie's record distributor MCA expressed interest in recording an album with Manson on lead vocals rather than furthering its commitment to the Mackenzies. The Mackenzies' record label boss Gary Kurfirst signed Manson as a solo artist, with the remaining Mackenzies performing as her backing band to circumvent the band's existing deal with MCA.

Two releases promoted the album; the first an EP, Suffocate Me was released mid-1993, while the second, "Heartbreak to Hate", was released to radio at the time of the album's release. The music video for "Suffocate Me" famously aired once by MTV during 120 Minutes, where it was seen by Garbage co-founder Steve Marker. Manson was asked to join Garbage, and accepted. The Angelfish side-project was dissolved, while Goodbye Mr. Mackenzie continued on for another two years without Manson.

== Recording ==
The songs that make up both Angelfish and the Mackenzie album Five were written at the same time, between June 1991 and December 1992. "Those albums," states Martin Metcalfe, "are brother and sister." The recording sessions for the album took ten days over March 1993, enough time to lay down backing tracks for seventeen songs.

== Music ==
Sydney Taylor of Loudwire said the album's music "shimmer[s] with moody guitars and haunting atmospherics; but it was Manson’s voice — cool, venomous, and emotionally razor-sharp that cut through the haze."

== Critical reception ==
Professional ratings
Review scores
Source	Rating
Allmusic	4/5 stars

Angelfish received a positive response from contemporary music critics and journalists. Barry Egan of Creem wrote: "Their self-titled debut displays the kind of out-of-kilter charm and intensity that most artists can only lie about possessing... this is indeed a record that owes much to Scotland's Cocteau Twins as it does to Lou Reed's feel-good dark angels, The Velvet Underground." In the Gavin Report trade publication, their alternative reviewer wrote "An interesting sound... one that recalls elements of early Blondie and Patti Smith".

== Legacy ==
In 2025, Sydney Taylor of Loudwire wrote: "Angelfish were over before it really got started, but what they left behind is a criminally overlooked gem of ‘90s alt-rock. Angelfish weren’t just a launching pad, but a statement far too good to be forgotten.

== Track listing ==
All songs by Angelfish, except where noted.

1. "Dogs in a Cage" – 2:34
2. "Suffocate Me" – 3:40
3. "You Can Love Her" (Holly Vincent) – 3:48
4. "King of the World" – 3:03
5. "Sleep with Me" – 3:21
6. "Heartbreak to Hate" – 4:15
7. "The Sun Won't Shine" – 3:52
8. "Mummy Can't Drive" – 3:57
9. "Tomorrow Forever" – 3:30
10. "The End" (Martin Metcalfe, Neil Baldwin, Derek Kelly) – 4:25

== Personnel ==
- Vocals: Shirley Manson
- Producers: Chris Frantz and Tina Weymouth
- Executive producer: Gary Kurfirst

== Release history ==
Region	Date	Label
Japan	2 February 1994	MCA Victor MVCM 456
Canada	15 February 1994	MCA Canada RARD-10917
United States	15 February 1994	Radioactive Records RARD/C-10917
Europe	28 February 1994	MCA Records RARD-10917

In the United Kingdom, Angelfish remains an import-only release, distributed by Island Records. Most copies come with a "featuring Shirley Manson of Garbage" sticker.

On 23 February 2021, Angelfish was released worldwide to digital music/streaming platforms.

== Charts and sales ==
Country	Peak position	Certification	Sales
United States	196	None	10,000
