= Pablove Foundation =

US pediatric cancer nonprofit organization

The Pablove Foundation is a US pediatric cancer nonprofit organization located in Los Angeles, California.

== History ==
In 2008, Jo Ann Thrailkill and Jeff Castelaz founded the Pablove Foundation. The organization is named for Thrailkill and Castelaz's son, Pablo Thrailkill Castelaz, who, in 2009, at six years old died from Wilms' tumor, a rare form of childhood cancer.

The mission of The Pablove Foundation is to invest in underfunded, cutting-edge pediatric cancer research, and through the arts, improve the lives of children who have cancer. They also provide information to parents of children with cancer.

== Pablove Shutterbugs ==
The Shutterbug program provides cameras and lessons for cancer patients to learn photography. The programs include classes at the Massachusetts College of Art and Design.

The foundation sponsored some of the Shutterbug participants to capture the Golden Globes.

== Events ==
- Pablove Across America
