= The Rattler =

1986 single by Goodbye Mr. Mackenzie

Single by Goodbye Mr Mackenzie
- Released: 6 October 1986
- Recorded: Hart Street Studios, Edinburgh, Scotland
- Genre: Alternative rock, new wave
- Length: 3:51
- Label: The Precious Organisation
- Songwriter(s): Derek Kelly, Martin Metcalfe
- Producer(s): Wilf Smarties

Goodbye Mr Mackenzie singles chronology
"Death of a Salesman" (1984)	"The Rattler" (1986)	"Face to Face" (1987)

"The Rattler"

Single by Goodbye Mr Mackenzie

from the album Good Deeds and Dirty Rags
- Released: February 1989
- Genre: Alternative rock, new wave
- Length: 3:51
- Label: Capitol
- Songwriter(s): Derek Kelly, Martin Metcalfe
- Producer(s): Goodbye Mr Mackenzie; Add. production and mix by Mack; Engineered by Jack The Cat

Goodbye Mr Mackenzie singles chronology
"Open Your Arms" (1988)	"The Rattler" (1989)	"Goodwill City" / "I'm Sick of You" (1989)

"The Rattler" is a 1986 song by Scottish alternative rock group Goodbye Mr Mackenzie and has become their most enduring track, often referred to as a "lost classic" of the Scottish music scene. The song was often described as "Springsteen-esque", even though the song had not been inspired or written in that way.

"The Rattler" was originally released independently, but was withdrawn from radio airplay over its lyrical content. Despite this the track reached #8 on the indie charts. Three years later, "The Rattler" was re-recorded and released on a major label as the third single released upfront of the band's debut album Good Deeds and Dirty Rags. "The Rattler" became the band's only Top 40 hit.

== Single release ==
The Mackenzies recorded "The Rattler" with producer Wilf Smarties, who was known for producing Edinburgh cult-band The Fire Engines. At the same time, Smarties had been producing demos for Wet Wet Wet, whose manager Elliot Davis heard their material. Davis signed the Mackenzies up to his label, The Precious Organisation, under a management deal. On 6 October 1986, Precious issued "The Rattler" on 7" vinyl, backed with bonus track "Candlestick Park". A week later, a 12" version followed, with an additional bonus track "The End". The band edited a home-made music video for "The Rattler", which was broadcast on The Tube, which encouraged radio play of the song. But within weeks, "The Rattler" was abruptly dropped from Radio One playlists, allegedly due to the lyrics alluding to cunnilingus.

Following the release of "The Rattler", the band changed management for follow-up single "Face to Face", before being signed to Capitol Records in a major-label record deal. In March 1989, Capitol Records released the re-recorded "The Rattler" in multiple-formats including CD single, cassette single, two 7" vinyl and two 12" vinyls, one of each which was a limited edition with a gatefold sleeve, and a third 12" with an exclusive free poster. The single package was rounded out with b-sides "Calton Hill" and "Here Comes Deacon Brodie", named respectively after Calton Hill, an Edinburgh location and William Brodie, a local 18th century councillor who maintained a secret life as a burglar; and a recording of sea shanty "Drunken Sailor".

"The Rattler" debuted on the UK singles chart at #55; peaking at #37 four weeks later. "The Rattler" spent a total of six weeks on the UK charts, but provided the launch for Good Deeds and Dirty Rags to debut at #26 on the UK Albums chart.

== Track listings ==
=== Original release ===
- UK 7" single The Precious Organisation JEWEL2T
1. "The Rattler (I Hold What I Need In My Right Hand)"
2. "Candlestick Park (Wrapped Up In Paper And Words)"
- UK 12" single The Precious Organisation JEWEL2T
1. "The Rattler (I Hold What I Need In My Right Hand)"
2. "Candlestick Park (Wrapped Up In Paper And Words)"
3. "The End (We Never Got The Way That We Should Go)"

=== Major label re-release ===
- UK 7" single Capitol Records CL 522 (Card sleeve)
- UK 7" single Capitol Records CLG 522 (Gatefold sleeve)
1. "The Rattler" - 4:04
2. "Here Comes Deacon Brodie" - 5:08
- UK 12" single Capitol Records 12CL 522
- UK 12" single Capitol Records 12CLP 522 (Limited edition w/poster)
1. "The Rattler" - 4:04
2. "Here Comes Deacon Brodie" - 5:08
3. "Theme From Calton Hill" - 4:15
- UK 12" single Capitol Records 12CLG 522 (Gatefold sleeve)
- UK CD single Capitol Records CDCL 522
1. "The Rattler" - 4:04
2. "Here Comes Deacon Brodie" - 5:08
3. "Calton Hill" - 4:15
4. "Drunken Sailor" - 3:28

== Credits ==
- Artwork By [Design And Art Direction] - Ken Donald
- Bass - Neil Baldwin (2)
- Drums - Kelly*
- Lyrics By [Words], Music By - Kelly*, Metcalfe*
- Producer - Wilf Smarties (tracks: A, B1)
- Vocals, Guitar - Martin*
- Vocals, Keyboards - Rona*, Shirley Manson

== Charts ==
Year	Chart	Position
1986	UK Indie Chart	8
1989	UK Singles Chart (The Official Charts Company)	37
