= Angelfish (band) =

Scottish alternative rock group

- Angelfish c. 1993

Background information
- Origin: Edinburgh, Scotland
- Genres: Alternative rock; dream pop; gothic rock
- Years active: 1993–1995
- Labels: Radioactive; MCA
- Spinoffs: Garbage
- Past members: Shirley Manson; Martin Metcalfe; Fin Wilson; Derek Kelly

Angelfish was a short-lived early-1990s Scottish alternative rock group originating from Edinburgh, Scotland, formed as a side-project to Scottish group Goodbye Mr Mackenzie, after keyboardist and backing vocalist Shirley Manson was signed as a solo artist to circumvent the Mackenzies' existing record contract.

== History ==
Angelfish released a single self-titled studio album, Angelfish, and two singles of which the first was an EP for minor college radio hit "Suffocate Me". The Angelfish album was born out of necessity when Goodbye Mr Mackenzie's record distributor MCA expressed interest in recording an album with Manson on lead vocals rather than furthering its commitment to the Mackenzies. The Mackenzies' record label boss Gary Kurfirst signed Manson as a solo artist, with the remaining Mackenzies performing as her backing band to circumvent the band's existing deal with MCA. Angelfish received a positive response from contemporary music critics and journalists. Barry Egan of Creem wrote: "Their self-titled debut displays the kind of out-of-kilter charm and intensity that most artists can only lie about possessing... this is indeed a record that owes much to Scotland's Cocteau Twins as it does to Lou Reed's feel-good dark angels, The Velvet Underground." In the Gavin Report trade publication, their alternative reviewer wrote "An interesting sound... one that recalls elements of early Blondie and Patti Smith".

Two releases promoted the album; the first an EP, Suffocate Me was released mid-1993, while the second, "Heartbreak to Hate", was released to radio at the time of the album's release. The music video for "Suffocate Me" famously aired once by MTV during 120 Minutes, where it was seen by Garbage co-founder Steve Marker. Manson was asked to join Garbage, and accepted. The Angelfish side-project was dissolved, while Goodbye Mr. Mackenzie continued on for another two years without Manson.

In 2025 they announced a gig in aid of Gaza in the Liquid Rooms in Edinburgh in January 2026. This sold out so quick they added a second date the next night which also sold out.

== Legacy ==
In 2025, Sydney Taylor of Loudwire included Angelfish in her list of "5 '90s Alternative Rock Bands That Should've Been Bigger".

== Discography ==
=== Albums ===
List of studio albums, with selected chart positions, sales figures and certifications
Title	Details	Peak chart positions	Sales
Title	Details	US	Sales
Angelfish	Released: 15 February 1994; Label: Radioactive Records / MCA; Formats: CD, LP, cassette, digital download	196	US: 10,000

=== Singles and EPs ===
Year	Release	Label
1993	Suffocate Me EP	Wasteland/Caroline Records
1994	"Heartbreak to Hate"	Radioactive Records/MCA
