= Suffocate Me =

EP by Angelfish
- Released: 8 June 1993 (CD) and 11 June 1993 (cassette)
- Recorded: 1993 in Connecticut, United States
- Genre: Alternative rock, dream pop
- Length: 13:52
- Label: Wasteland / Caroline Records
- Producer: Chris Frantz, Tina Weymouth

Angelfish chronology
Suffocate Me (1993)	"Heartbreak to Hate" (1994)

Suffocate Me is an extended play released in 1993 by Scottish band Angelfish. While not charting on any mainstream Billboard charts, "Suffocate Me" was received well on college radio, and was followed up in 1994 by the release of Angelfish's self-titled debut album.

The music video for "Suffocate Me" was famously aired once by MTV during 120 Minutes, where it was seen by Garbage co-founder Steve Marker. Shirley Manson was asked to join Garbage, and accepted.

== Track listing ==
1. "Suffocate Me" (Angelfish) – 3:46
2. "You Can Love Her" (Holly Vincent) – 3:52
3. "Kimberly" (Patti Smith, Allen Lanier, Ivan Kral) – 3:46
4. "Trash It" (Angelfish) – 2:55

Both "Suffocate Me" and "You Can Love Her" would appear on the band's debut album, Angelfish, released the following year, while "Trash It" would be re-recorded and released as "Superman" on the B-side of Goodbye Mr Mackenzie's final single "The Way I Walk".

== Music video ==
The "Suffocate Me" music video was directed by Cameron Casey and premiered in the US on 6 August 1993.
