= Gary Kurfirst =

American music manager

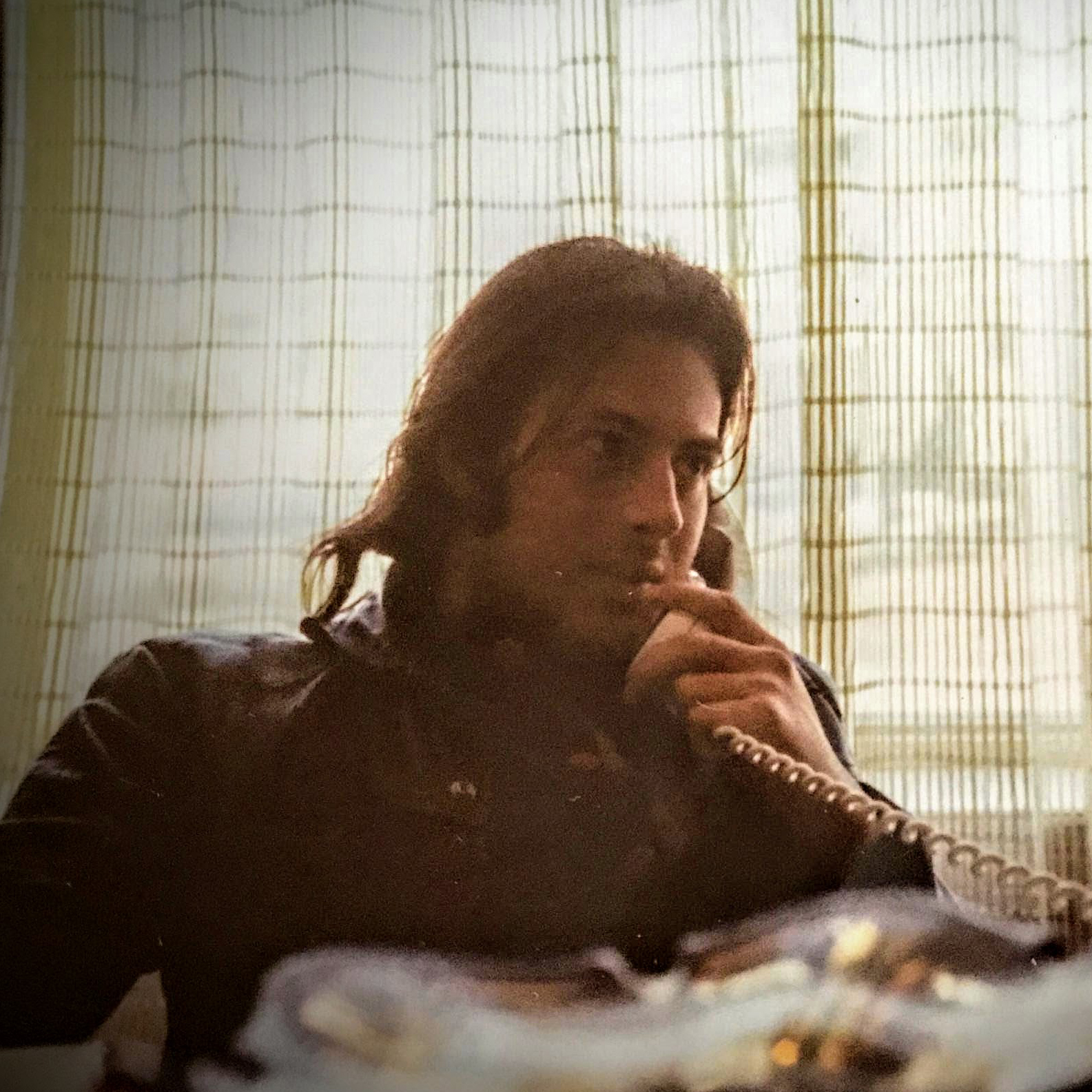
- Kurfirst circa 1970s, NYC
- Born: Gary Kurfirst; July 8, 1947; Forest Hills, Queens U.S.
- Died: January 13, 2009 (aged 61); Bahamas
- Occupations: Concert promoter; artist management; film producer; music publisher; label executive
- Years active: 1966–2009
- Spouse: Phyllis Kurfirst
- Children: Josh Kurfirst; Lindsay Yannocone
- Website: https://www.garykurfirst.com/

Gary Kurfirst (July 8, 1947 – January 13, 2009) was an American music promoter, producer, manager, publisher, and record label executive. Kurfirst founded Radioactive Records, whose acts included Live, Black Grape, Ramones, Big Audio Dynamite, Talking Heads, Eurythmics and Shirley Manson. He managed a variety of artists including Manson, Blondie, Tom Tom Club, the Ramones, Jean Beauvoir, Eurythmics, Bob Marley and the Wailers, Toots and the Maytals, and The B-52s.

== Early years ==
Kurfirst was born in Forest Hills, Queens. He started promoting dances while he was still a student at Forest Hills High School in Queens. He rapidly moved on to organizing and promoting shows at the tennis stadium at the West Side Tennis Club in Forest Hills and moving across the East River to promoting gigs in Manhattan. Kurfirst helped arrange the first East Coast performances of acts including Jimi Hendrix and The Who.

== Career ==
He established the Village Theater in the East Village at Second Avenue at Sixth Street in 1967, which a year later became the Fillmore East under the management of promoter Bill Graham. In August 1968, Kurfist organized the New York Rock Festival at the Singer Bowl in Flushing Meadow Park, an open-air concert with 18,000 in attendance that featured performances by The Chambers Brothers, The Doors, Jimi Hendrix, Janis Joplin and the Soft Machine. In his obituary, The New York Times credited Kurfirst's success at the New York Rock Festival with inspiring the creation of the Woodstock Festival in Bethel, New York in August 1969.

While negotiating a contract for the group Mountain in the late 1960s, Kurfirst developed a close relationship with Chris Blackwell, his counterpart at Island Records. Blackwell, quoted in Kurfirst's obituary in The New York Times, described him as "one of the first managers who basically built the rock business", stating that Kurfirst "stayed below the radar and once refused the cover of Rolling Stone because he felt it was not the right time for his band".

Kurfirst managed reggae artists The Wailers founder Peter Tosh and Toots & the Maytals. His reach spanned new wave, reggae, punk, rock and pop. His client list as manager included the Ramones, Blondie, Talking Heads, Tom Tom Club, the B-52's, Eurythmics, Jane's Addiction, Holly and the Italians and Shirley Manson (Angelfish).

== Talking Heads ==
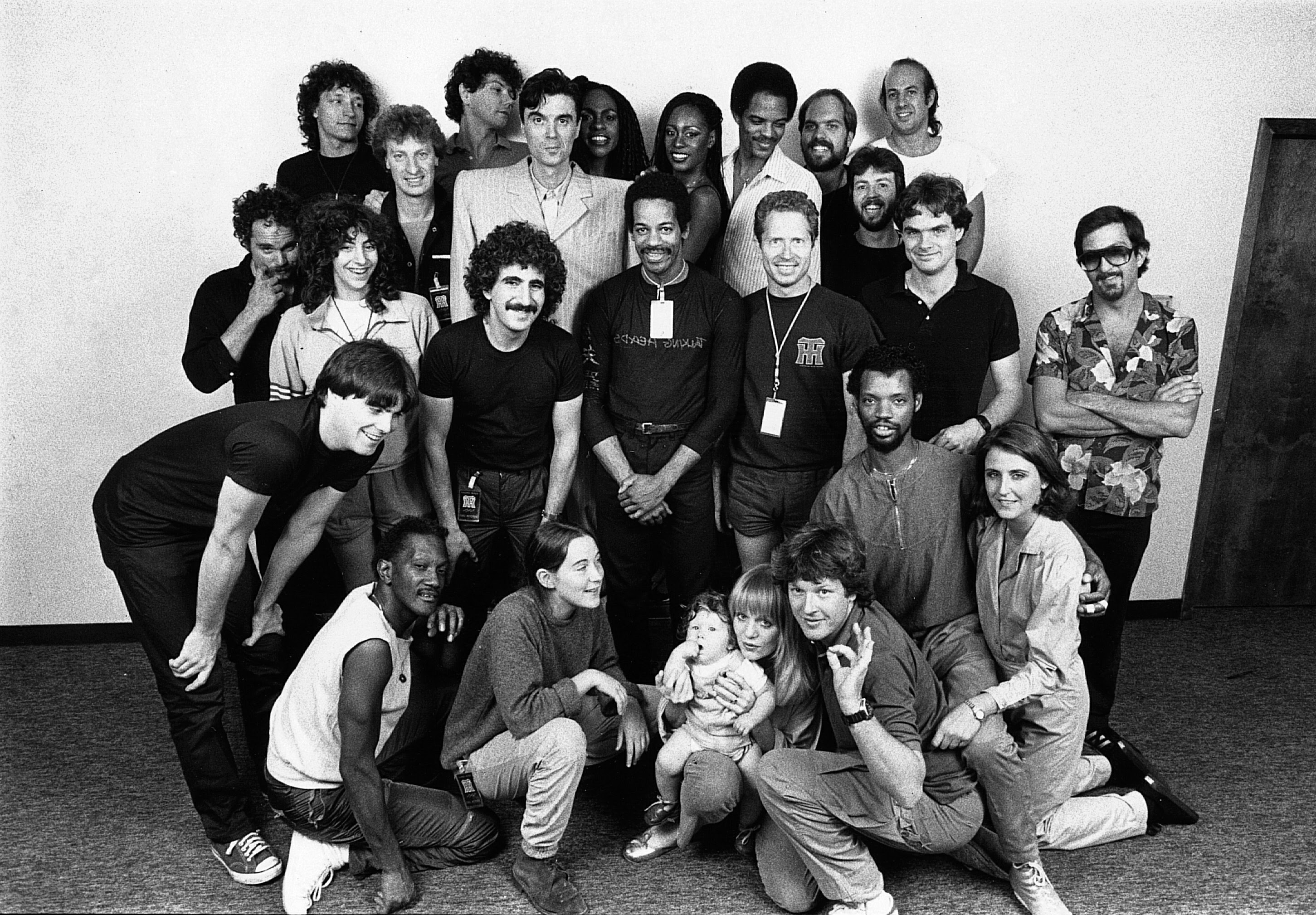
Talking Heads & crew at Pantages Theatre, December 1983. Kurfirst top row, far right.

Gary Kurfirst began managing Talking Heads in 1977 after attending their show at CBGB in New York. He remained their only manager. Talking Heads were an American new wave band formed in 1975 in New York City. The band was composed of David Byrne (lead vocals, guitar), Chris Frantz (drums), Tina Weymouth (bass) and Jerry Harrison (keyboards, guitar). Described as "one of the most critically acclaimed bands of the '80s," Talking Heads helped to pioneer new wave music by combining elements of punk, art rock, funk, and world music with an anxious yet clean-cut image.

== Awards ==
Gary was awarded a Lifetime Achievement Award at The 36th annual Pollstar awards show on April 16, 2025, at The Beverly Hilton in Los Angeles, California. The Lifetime Achievement Award recognizes those who have influenced and led the live entertainment sector for decades. Gary's son Josh Kurfirst was also in attendance at the event as a guest speaker and accepted the award on Gary's behalf.

== Films ==
Kurfirst produced True Stories and Siesta and executive produced Stop Making Sense.

== Death ==
Kurfirst died at age 61 on January 13, 2009, while he was vacationing in the Bahamas.
