= Not Your Kind of People World Tour =

2012–13 concert tour by Garbage

- World tour by Garbage
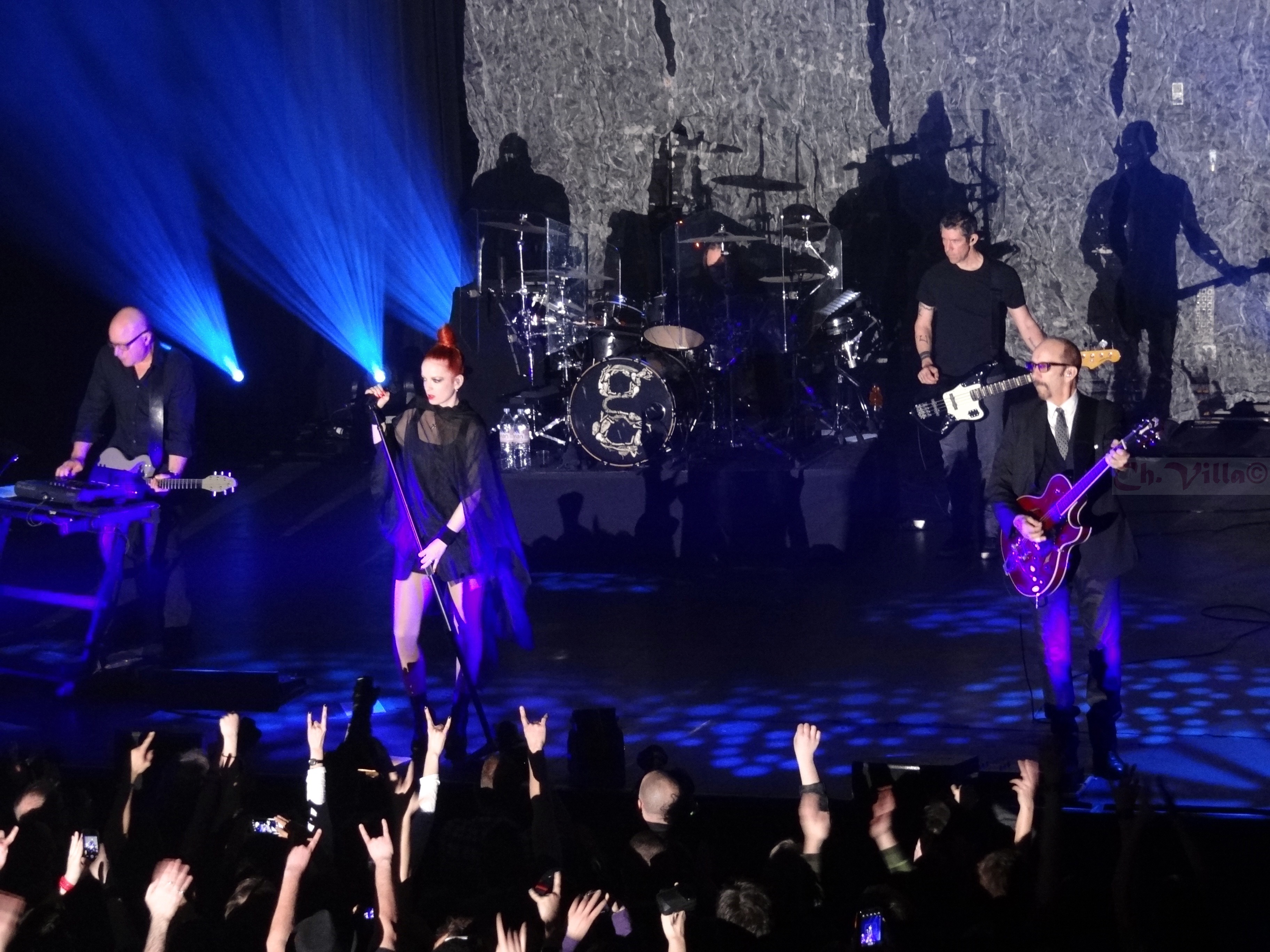
- Garbage, featuring tour bassist Eric Avery, playing at Montreal's Métropolis, March 2013.
- Associated album: Not Your Kind of People
- Start date: April 6, 2012
- End date: April 18, 2013
- Legs: 9
- No. of shows: 55 in North America; 46 in Europe; 4 in Asia; 6 in South America; 9 in Oceania; 120 total
- Supporting acts: Laura Escudé; The Jezabels; Screaming Females; Saiko; Coockco; The Cubes; Private Life; Superbus (band); Io Echo; White Mystery
- Website: www.garbage.com

Garbage concert chronology
- Bleed Like Me World Tour (2005); Not Your Kind of People World Tour (2012–2013); 20 Years Queer (2015)

The Not Your Kind of People Tour is the fifth world concert tour cycle by American alternative rock group Garbage. The tour launched May 2012 in Los Angeles, United States and included headline performances and festival appearances throughout North America, Europe and Asia. The tour also routed South America and several festivals in Australia during 2013.

The tour marks the first Garbage concerts since 2007; and the first tour since the Bleed Like Me tour was ended in October 2005. "Thinking about going back on the road is both thrilling and terrifying in equal measure", lead singer Shirley Manson stated in a press release for the launch of the album and tour; "…but we’ve always enjoyed a little pain mixed in with our pleasure." The band's touring line-up is augmented by the addition of Eric Avery on bass guitar. Tour rehearsals took place in Los Angeles throughout March.

A DVD/Blu-ray release of the Denver, Colorado show was released in May 2013, titled One Mile High... Live.

== Tour itinerary ==
In late 2011, Garbage announced their return to touring upon the release of Not Your Kind of People. The tour kicked off in United States West Coast, running through a few mountain states and Texas and then route into Europe for headline shows in United Kingdom, France and Russia before returning to North America to perform shows on the East Coast and Canada. The tour then made its way back to Europe for Garbage to perform their own headline shows in Netherlands, Luxembourg and across the United Kingdom, and to appear on the bills of rock festivals across Europe. Further performances were scheduled in Canada and Japan. The late April concerts in Texas, Colorado and Utah were rescheduled due to personal problems of Duke Erikson.

== Broadcast and recordings ==
According to the band, MTV Hive would livestream the concert from Webster Hall as part of its monthly Live in NYC series, making the full performance available for on-demand viewing the following week after the concert. "So excited that MTV is filming our first show in NYC for more than seven years. It's going to be a pretty special night for us", lead singer Shirley Manson tells The Hollywood Reporter. "The gig sold out in 5 minutes flat so we know its going to be full of hardcore fans who have been waiting on our new record with unbelievable patience and overwhelming enthusiasm."

== Opening acts ==
- Laura Escudé (select dates)
- The Jezabels (select dates)
- Screaming Females (select dates)
- Saiko (Santiago)
- Coockoo (Russia)
- The Cubes (Bratislava)
- Private Life (Australia) (http://www.privatelifeband.com)
- Superbus (Europe)
- Io ECHO (North America)
- White Mystery (Richmond) (http://www.whitemysteryband.com)

== Setlists ==
The tour set list omits less well known songs for festival appearances. Upon the commencement of the tour, Garbage performed "Temptation Waits", "The Trick Is to Keep Breathing" and "The World Is Not Enough" for the first time in a few tour cycles. Newly debuted tracks from Not Your Kind of People were "Automatic Systematic Habit", "Blood for Poppies", "Control", "Man on a Wire" and "Battle In Me". Songs introduced during the run include "Milk", "Cup of Coffee" and "You Look So Fine" returned to the set over the course of the tour, while Not Your Kind of People tracks "Big Bright World", "Not Your Kind of People", "The One", "Beloved Freak" and "I Hate Love" were debuted and performed in concert, while a cover of "Because the Night" was introduced in 2013.

During this tour, Shirley quoted lines from Fleetwood Mac's "Dreams" and Freedy Johnston's "This Perfect World" on the outro for "You Look So Fine", Donna Summer's "Love To Love You Baby" on the intro of "Stupid Girl", and Madonna's "Erotic" on the intro to "#1 Crush". In addition to interpolating from "Talk of the Town" by The Pretenders on "Special", Shirley also quoted lines from their cover of "I Go to Sleep".

A number of intro tape samples were used throughout the tour, including the band's own then-unreleased song "Time Will Destroy Everything" as the lead tape. The "tears in rain" monologue from Blade Runner preceded "Hammering in My Head".

Westlake (April 6, 2012)

1. "Supervixen"
2. "Temptation Waits"
3. "Shut Your Mouth"
4. "Metal Heart"
5. "Queer"
6. "Stupid Girl"
7. "Why Do You Love Me"
8. "#1 Crush"
9. "The Trick Is to Keep Breathing"
10. "Vow"
11. "Blood for Poppies"
12. "Man on a Wire"
13. "Milk"
14. "I Think I'm Paranoid"
15. "Bad Boyfriend"
16. "Only Happy When It Rains"
17. "Push It"
18. "Special"
19. "The World Is Not Enough"
20. "Battle In Me"
New York City (May 22, 2012)

1. "Automatic Systematic Habit"
2. "Temptation Waits"
3. "Shut Your Mouth"
4. "Queer"
5. "Metal Heart"
6. "Stupid Girl"
7. "Why Do You Love Me"
8. "The World Is Not Enough"
9. "#1 Crush"
10. "Cherry Lips"
11. "Blood for Poppies"
12. "Battle In Me"
13. "Milk"
14. "Big Bright World"
15. "I Think I'm Paranoid"
16. "Bad Boyfriend"
17. "Only Happy When It Rains"
18. "Push It"
19. "Supervixen"
20. "The Trick Is to Keep Breathing"
21. "Vow"
London (July 1, 2012)

1. "Automatic Systematic Habit"
2. "I Think I'm Paranoid"
3. "Shut Your Mouth"
4. "Metal Heart"
5. "Queer"
6. "Stupid Girl"
7. "Why Do You Love Me"
8. "Control"
9. "#1 Crush"
10. "Cherry Lips"
11. "Blood for Poppies"
12. "Special"
13. "Milk"
14. "Big Bright World"
15. "Man On A Wire"
16. "Bad Boyfriend"
17. "Only Happy When It Rains"
18. "Push It"
19. "Supervixen"
20. "Not Your Kind of People"
21. "Vow"
Denver (October 6, 2012)

1. "Automatic Systematic Habit"
2. "I Think I'm Paranoid"
3. "Shut Your Mouth"
4. "Why Do You Love Me"
5. "Queer"
6. "Stupid Girl"
7. "Hammering in My Head"
8. "Control"
9. "#1 Crush"
10. "Cherry Lips"
11. "Big Bright World"
12. "Blood for Poppies"
13. "Special"
14. "Milk"
15. "Battle In Me"
16. "Push It"
17. "Only Happy When It Rains"
18. "Supervixen"
19. "The Trick Is to Keep Breathing"
20. "Vow"
Santiago (October 15, 2012)

1. "Automatic Systematic Habit"
2. "I Think I'm Paranoid"
3. "Shut Your Mouth"
4. "Why Do You Love Me"
5. "Queer"
6. "Stupid Girl"
7. "Hammering in My Head"
8. "Control"
9. "The One"
10. "#1 Crush"
11. "Cherry Lips"
12. "Blood for Poppies"
13. "Special"
14. "Cup Of Coffee"
15. "Battle In Me"
16. "Push It"
17. "Only Happy When It Rains"
18. "Vow"

Encore:

1. "Supervixen"
2. "I Hate Love"
3. "Milk" (request from the audience)
4. "You Look So Fine"
Bogotá (October 27, 2012)

1. "Automatic Systematic Habit"
2. "I Think I'm Paranoid"
3. "Shut Your Mouth"
4. "Why Do You Love Me"
5. "Queer"
6. "Stupid Girl"
7. "Hammering in My Head"
8. "Control"
9. "#1 Crush"
10. "Cherry Lips"
11. "Blood for Poppies"
12. "The World Is Not Enough"
13. "Special"
14. "I Go To Sleep" (The Pretenders Cover)
15. "Push It"
16. "Vow"
17. "Only Happy When It Rains"

== Tour dates ==
Date	City	Country	Venue
North America
April 6, 2012	Westlake	United States	Bootleg Theater
April 9, 2012	Los Angeles	United States	El Rey Theatre
April 10, 2012	Los Angeles	United States	El Rey Theatre
April 14, 2012	Las Vegas	United States	Pearl Concert Theater
April 16, 2012	Tucson	United States	Rialto Theatre
April 17, 2012	Tempe	United States	The Marquee
April 22, 2012	Dallas	United States	Edgefest
May 5, 2012	Irvine	United States	KROQ Weenie Roast y Fiesta
Europe
May 9, 2012	London	United Kingdom	Troxy
May 11, 2012	St. Petersburg	Russia	Jubilenyi Hal
May 12, 2012	Moscow	Russia	Crocus City Hall
May 16, 2012	Paris	France	Olympia Theatre
North America
May 22, 2012	New York City	United States	Webster Hall
May 23, 2012	Washington, D.C.	United States	9:30 Club
May 25, 2012	Atlantic City	United States	House of Blues
May 26, 2012	Boston	United States	Paradise Rock Club
May 28, 2012	Toronto	Canada	Phoenix Concert Theatre
June 1, 2012	Santa Barbara	United States	Summer Round Up
June 2, 2012	Mountain View	United States	Live 105 BFD
June 3, 2012	San Diego	United States	91X X-Fest
Europe
June 9, 2012	Warsaw	Poland	Orange Warsaw Festival
June 11, 2012	Samara	Russia	Rock Above Volga Festival
June 12, 2012	Odesa	Ukraine	Prosto Rock Festival
June 16, 2012	Hultsfred	Sweden	Hultsfred Festival
June 17, 2012	Aarhus	Denmark	NorthSide Festival
June 19, 2012	Amsterdam	Netherlands	Melkweg
June 22, 2012	Tuttlingen	Germany	Southside Festival
June 23, 2012	Scheeßel	Germany	Hurricane Festival
June 24, 2012	Paris	France	Solidays Festival
June 27, 2012	Luxembourg	Luxembourg	Den Atelier
June 28, 2012	Werchter	Belgium	Rock Werchter
June 29, 2012	Arras	France	Main Square Festival
July 1, 2012	London	United Kingdom	Brixton Academy
July 2, 2012	Wolverhampton	United Kingdom	Wolverhampton Civic Hall
July 3, 2012	Manchester	United Kingdom	Manchester Academy
July 4, 2012	Glasgow	United Kingdom	Barrowland Ballroom
July 6, 2012	Bucharest	Romania	BestFest
July 8, 2012	Hérouville-Saint-Clair	France	Beauregard Festival
July 11, 2012	Castello Vigevano	Italy	10 Giorni Suonati
July 12, 2012	Rome	Italy	Rock In Roma
July 14, 2012	Bilbao	Spain	Bilbao Live Festival
July 15, 2012	Aix-les-Bains	France	Musilac Festival
July 17, 2012	Arles	France	Les Escales Du Cargo Festival
July 19, 2012	Vila Nova de Gaia	Portugal	Mares Vivas Festival
July 21, 2012	Nyon	Switzerland	Paléo Festival
July 22, 2012	Carhaix	France	Vieilles Charrues Festival
North America
August 4, 2012	Montreal	Canada	Osheaga Festival
August 7, 2012	Chicago	United States	Metro Chicago
August 8, 2012	Kansas City	United States	Buzz Under the Stars
August 9, 2012	Madison	United States	Warner Park
August 11, 2012	Omaha	United States	Maha Music Festival
Asia
August 15, 2012	Taipei	Taiwan	Twinkle Rock Festival
August 18, 2012	Osaka	Japan	Summer Sonic Festival
August 19, 2012	Tokyo	Japan	Summer Sonic Festival
August 21, 2012	Singapore	Singapore	Fort Canning
North America
September 12, 2012	Monterrey	Mexico	MTV World Stage
September 14, 2012	Richmond	United States	The National
September 15, 2012	Bristow	United States	DC101 Kerfuffle
September 16, 2012	Charlotte	United States	106.5 The End Weenie Roast
September 22, 2012	Atlanta	United States	Music Midtown Festival
September 26, 2012	Seattle	United States	Showbox SoDo
September 27, 2012	Portland	United States	Roseland Theater
September 29, 2012	Vancouver	Canada	The Centre for Performing Arts
October 1, 2012	San Francisco	United States	The Warfield Theatre
October 2, 2012	Los Angeles	United States	Hollywood Palladium
October 5, 2012	Salt Lake City	United States	In The Venue
October 6, 2012	Denver	United States	Ogden Theatre
October 9, 2012	Houston	United States	House of Blues
October 10, 2012	Austin	United States	La Zona Rosa
South America
October 15, 2012	Santiago	Chile	Teatro Caupolicán
October 17, 2012	Montevideo	Uruguay	Primavera 0 Festival
October 18, 2012	Buenos Aires	Argentina	Pepsi Music Festival
October 20, 2012	São Paulo	Brazil	Planeta Terra Festival
October 24, 2012	Asunción	Paraguay	Conmebol Convention Center
October 27, 2012	Bogotá	Colombia	Planeta Terra Festival
Europe
November 1, 2012	Kazan	Russia	Milo Arena
November 2, 2012	Nizhny Novgorod	Russia	Milo Concert Hall
November 4, 2012	Yekaterinburg	Russia	Tele Club
November 5, 2012	Novosibirsk	Russia	Otdykh Club
November 7, 2012	Moscow	Russia	Izvestia Hall
November 9, 2012	St. Petersburg	Russia	A2 Club
November 12, 2012	Kyiv	Ukraine	The Palace of Sport
November 13, 2012	Minsk	Belarus	Sport Palace
November 14, 2012	Riga	Latvia	Palladium
November 16, 2012	Kraków	Poland	Klub Kwadrat
November 18, 2012	Bratislava	Slovakia	Atelier Babylon
November 20, 2012	Amsterdam	Netherlands	Paradiso
November 22, 2012	Paris	France	Zénith Paris
November 23, 2012	Lyon	France	Transbordeur
November 25, 2012	Brussels	Belgium	Ancienne Belgique
November 26, 2012	Cologne	Germany	E-Werk
November 27, 2012	Berlin	Germany	Huxleys
North America
December 6, 2012	Highland	United States	San Manuel Casino
December 8, 2012	Los Angeles	United States	KROQ Almost Acoustic Christmas
Oceania
February 19, 2013	Wellington	New Zealand	Michael Fowler Centre
February 20, 2013	Auckland	New Zealand	Auckland Civic Theatre
February 23, 2013	Brisbane	Australia	Soundwave Music Festival
February 24, 2013	Sydney	Australia	Soundwave Music Festival
February 25, 2013	Sydney	Australia	The Metro Theatre
February 27, 2013	Melbourne	Australia	Forum Theatre
March 1, 2013	Melbourne	Australia	Soundwave Music Festival
March 2, 2013	Adelaide	Australia	Soundwave Music Festival
March 4, 2013	Perth	Australia	Soundwave Music Festival
March 6, 2013	Sydney	Australia	Star Event Centre
North America
March 20, 2013	Montclair	United States	Wellmont Theater
March 22, 2013	New York City	United States	Terminal 5
March 23, 2013	Philadelphia	United States	Electric Factory
March 24, 2013	Silver Spring	United States	The Fillmore
March 26, 2013	Boston	United States	House of Blues
March 27, 2013	Montreal	Canada	Metropolis
March 28, 2013	Toronto	Canada	Sound Academy
March 30, 2013	Detroit	United States	Majestic Theatre
March 31, 2013	Cleveland	United States	House of Blues
April 2, 2013	Columbus	United States	Pavilion
April 3, 2013	Chicago	United States	Riviera Theatre
April 5, 2013	Minneapolis	United States	Mill City Nights
April 6, 2013	Milwaukee	United States	Eagle's Ballroom
April 7, 2013	Madison	United States	Orpheum Theatre
April 9, 2013	St. Louis	United States	The Pageant
April 10, 2013	North Kansas City	United States	Harrah's
April 12, 2013	Las Vegas	United States	Pearl Concert Theater
April 16, 2013	Monterrey	Mexico	Arena Monterrey
April 18, 2013	Mexico City	Mexico	Arena Ciudad de Mexico

Cancellations and rescheduled shows

April 20, 2012	Houston	United States	House of Blues	Rescheduled for October 9, 2012
April 21, 2012	Austin	United States	La Zona Rosa	Rescheduled for October 10, 2012
April 24, 2012	Aspen	United States	Belly Up	Postponed
April 25, 2012	Denver	United States	Ogden Theatre	Rescheduled for October 6, 2012
April 27, 2012	Salt Lake City	United States	In The Venue	Rescheduled for October 5, 2012
October 2, 2012	Los Angeles	United States	Wiltern Theatre	Moved to the Hollywood Palladium
October 24, 2012	Asunción	Paraguay	Yacht Y Golf Club	Moved to the Conmebol Convention Center
November 27, 2012	Berlin	Germany	Astra	Moved to the Huxleys

=== Box office score data ===
Venue	City	Tickets sold / available	Gross revenue
El Rey Theatre	Los Angeles	1,542 / 1,542 (100%)	$45,489
9:30 Club	Washington	1,200 / 1,200 (100%)	$42,000
House of Blues	Atlantic City	2,381 / 2,550 (93%)	$73,060
Summer Round Up	Santa Barbara	3,851 / 4,976 (77%)	$149,576
Metro Chicago	Chicago	1,150 / 1,150 (100%)	$42,550
La Zona Rosa	Austin	1,200 / 1,200 (100%)	$36,040
Conmebol Convention Center	Asunción	1,356 / 2,500 (54%)	$50,725
E-Werk	Cologne	1,873 / 2,000 (94%)	$72,935
Huxley's	Berlin	1,600 / 1,600 (100%)	$62,221
TOTAL		16,153 / 18,718 (86%)	$574,596

== Promotional performances ==
Date	Show	Set
April 2012	Yahoo! Live	"Blood for Poppies", "Stupid Girl", "Battle In Me"
May 14, 2012	TV Total	"Blood for Poppies"
May 15, 2012	Album de la Semaine	"Automatic Systematic Habit", "Blood for Poppies", "Man On a Wire", "Battle In Me", "Queer", "Stupid Girl", "The Trick Is to Keep Breathing", "Special", "Only Happy When It Rains", "Push It", "Vow"
May 18, 2012	Late Night with Jimmy Fallon	"Blood for Poppies", "Automatic Systematic Habit"
May 21, 2012	Radio 104.5	"Blood For Poppies", "Only Happy When It Rains", "I Think I'm Paranoid", "Vow" (Acoustic session)
May 31, 2012	98-7FM Penthouse	"Blood For Poppies", "Only Happy When It Rains", "I Think I'm Paranoid", "Vow" (Acoustic session)
October 3, 2012	Jimmy Kimmel Live!	"Control", "Blood For Poppies"
November 5, 2012	Evening Urgant	"I Think I'm Paranoid","Man On A Wire" – (not included in the ether)
December 7, 2012	The Tonight Show	"I Hate Love"
March 19, 2013	The Late Show	"Battle In Me"
