= Version 2.0 World Tour =

1998–99 concert tour by Garbage

- Tour by Garbage
- Garbage performing on-stage at Reading Festival on August 30, 1998
- Associated album: Version 2.0
- Start date: May 15, 1998
- End date: November 24, 1999
- Legs: 16
- No. of shows: 124 in North America; 75 in Europe; 4 in Asia; 4 in Africa; 12 in Oceania; 219 total
- Supporting acts: Talvin Singh; The Crystal Method; Moloko; Girls Against Boys; Placebo; Stellar*; Lit

Garbage concert chronology
- Garbage tour (1995–1996); Version 2.0 World Tour (1998–1999); Beautiful Garbage World Tour (2001–2002)

The Version 2.0 World Tour was the second world concert tour cycle by American alternative rock group Garbage, promoting their album Version 2.0 across North America, Europe, South Africa, Asia and Australia.

Garbage performed under the alias Stupid Girl for the first three shows on the tour, referencing their 1996 hit single of the same name. The Version 2.0 tour took in headline performances, support performances for Red Hot Chili Peppers and Alanis Morissette, and slots at rock festivals and radio shows around the world.

A number of notable acts supported Garbage throughout the run of the tour, including Placebo, Moloko, Talvin Singh, Stellar*, Lit, Rasmus, Crystal Method and Laurent Garnier to various reception.

== Itinerary ==
Preempting the start of their world tour, Garbage played three shows in the Midwest under the alias 'Stupid Girl'. The Version 2.0 tour officially kicked off with club dates starting at San Francisco's Warfield Theatre on May 20, and took the band to a number of key media cities in the United States and Canada. Garbage then travelled to Europe to play a number of rock festivals beginning June 1 at Netherlands' Pinkpop and finishing up at Scotland's T in the Park on July 12. In between the festivals, Garbage performed some headlining shows in France and the United Kingdom, with support coming from The Crystal Method. In August, the band travelled to Japan to perform on the bill at the Fuji Rock Festival, and then back to Scotland to perform at two "warm up" shows at Glasgow's Barrowland Ballroom and then headlining the last night of the Reading Festival.

Garbage returned to North America on September 17, to start a three-month tour. Support came from Girls Against Boys. The itinerary took the band from Denver, Colorado up the West Coast as north as Vancouver, British Columbia before routing towards the Southern States. Following these dates, the tour moved up the Eastern Seaboard and into Quebec and Ontario, before finishing up in the Midwest on November 28 in Green Bay, Wisconsin. During December, Garbage performed at radio shows on both coasts, including KROQ-FM's Almost Acoustic Christmas, and made a visit to Mexico City before wrapping up on December 20 in Detroit, Michigan.

Continuing their touring commitment into 1999, Garbage launched a European arena tour on January 14 at Dublin's Point Theatre. Local acts such as Laurent Garnier and Rasmus support continental dates; Moloko support Irish and UK shows. Concerts in Paris and St. Petersburg are filmed to be broadcast by MTV Europe and MTV Russia respectively. A show in Tallinn is cancelled on the day when the band's equipment is held up by customs officials at the Estonian border. The European run ends in Madrid on February 11. Garbage then returned to North America to support Alanis Morissette on two legs of The Junkie tour, starting on February 16 in Cincinnati routing along the Midwest, Four Corners states and onto the West Coast, ending on April 8 in Los Angeles.

Garbage revisited Europe to play a second summer of rock festivals, beginning with Vienna's Libro on May 19. The shows included visits to Israel and Iceland, although four concerts in the Baltic States and Russia are cancelled on the advice of the American Embassy due to the USA's involvement in Kosovo. Garbage headlined a special show to mark the opening of the Scottish Parliament in Edinburgh on July 1. The European dates conclude in Duisburg on July 25. Garbage then travelled to South Africa to play four shows with Placebo.

The final legs of the Version 2.0 tour see Garbage moving on to New Zealand and Australia to co-headline with Alanis Morissette, beginning in Auckland for sixteen days from Oct 1, and ending in Newcastle. During this time the band also performed at the Livid Festival. Garbage returned to North America to wind down the tour by headlining a series of shows organised by MTV on university campuses. Titled the Campus Invasion Tour, and supported by Lit, the shows began on October 20 in Denver and is routed through the Midwest, North East and Southern States, Arizona and California. The final date of the Version 2.0 tour is held in Irvine, California on November 24.

== Opening acts ==
- Talvin Singh (North America – leg 1 select dates)
- The Crystal Method (Europe – leg 1 only UK)
- Moloko (Europe – leg 3)
- Girls Against Boys (North America – leg 3)
- Placebo (Africa)
- Stellar* (Oceania)
- Lit (North America – leg 6)

== Setlists ==
North America (first leg)

1. "Push It"
2. "Dumb"
3. "Queer"
4. "Special"
5. "Fix Me Now"
6. "My Lover's Box"
7. "Hammering in My Head"
8. "Medication"
9. "Stupid Girl"
10. "Temptation Waits"
11. "Trip My Wire"
12. "Vow"
13. "#1 Crush"
14. "When I Grow Up"
15. "I Think I'm Paranoid"
16. "Only Happy When it Rains"

Encore:

1. "Thirteen"
2. "Girl Don't Come"
3. "You Look So Fine"
Europe (first leg)

1. "Dumb"
2. "Not My Idea"
3. "Push It"
4. "Queer"
5. "Special"
6. "My Lover's Box"
7. "Hammering in My Head"
8. "Medication"
9. "Stupid Girl"
10. "Temptation Waits"
11. "Trip My Wire"
12. "#1 Crush"
13. "Vow"
14. "When I Grow Up"
15. "I Think I'm Paranoid"
16. "Only Happy When it Rains"

Encore:

  1. "Thirteen"
  2. "Girl Don't Come"
  3. "You Look So Fine"
August 1998

1. "Temptation Waits"
2. "Not My Idea"
3. "I Think I'm Paranoid"
4. "Special"
5. "My Lover's Box"
6. "Hammering in My Head"
7. "Medication"
8. "Thirteen"
9. "#1 Crush"
10. "Stupid Girl"
11. "Vow"
12. "When I Grow Up"
13. "Queer"
14. "Push It"
15. "Only Happy When it Rains"
16. "You Look So Fine"

Encore:

  1. "Medication"
  2. "Dumb" or "Trip My Wire"
  3. "Girl Don't Come"
North America (second leg)

1. "Temptation Waits"
2. "Not My Idea"
3. "I Think I'm Paranoid"
4. "Special"
5. "My Lover's Box"
6. "Hammering in My Head"
7. "Thirteen"
8. "#1 Crush"
9. "Stupid Girl"
10. "Vow"
11. "When I Grow Up" initially then replaced by "Wicked Ways"
12. "Queer"
13. "Push It"
14. "Only Happy When it Rains"
15. "You Look So Fine"
16. Encore:
  1. "Supernatural" or "Kick My Ass"
  2. "Lick the Pavement" initially then replaced by "Milk" or "The Trick is to Keep Breathing"
  3. "Wicked Ways" initially then replaced by "When I Grow Up"
Europe (second leg)

1. "Temptation Waits"
2. "Not My Idea"
3. "I Think I'm Paranoid"
4. "Special"
5. "My Lover's Box"
6. "Hammering in My Head"
7. "Supernatural"
8. "Milk"
9. "Vow"
10. "Stupid Girl"
11. "Sleep Together" or "Fix Me Now"
12. "Queer"
13. "Push It"
14. "Only Happy When it Rains"
15. "You Look So Fine"
16. Encore:
  1. "Medication"
  2. "The Trick is to Keep Breathing"
  3. "Can't Seem to Make You Mine" or "Thirteen"
  4. "When I Grow Up"
Europe (Festival Set)

1. "Temptation Waits"
2. "Not My Idea"
3. "I Think I'm Paranoid"
4. "Special"
5. "Queer"
6. "Hammering in My Head"
7. "Medication"
8. "#1 Crush"
9. "Stupid Girl"
10. "Vow"
11. "Milk"
12. "Sleep Together"
13. "Push It"
14. "Only Happy When it Rains"
15. "You Look So Fine"
16. Encore:
  1. "Supervixen"
  2. "The Trick is to Keep Breathing" or "Thirteen"
  3. "When I Grow Up"
North America (MTV Campus Invasion Tour)

1. "#1 Crush"
2. "Supervixen"
3. "I Think I'm Paranoid"
4. "Special"
5. "Temptation Waits"
6. "Silence is Golden"
7. "Hammering in My Head"
8. "Medication"
9. "Stupid Girl"
10. "Vow"
11. "Milk"
12. "Push It"
13. "When I Grow Up"
14. "You Look So Fine"
15. Encore:
  1. "The World Is Not Enough"
  2. "Only Happy When it Rains"

== Tour dates ==
Date	City	Country	Venue
North America
May 15, 1998	Combined Locks	United States	Ryan's Ballroom ^{[A]}
May 16, 1998	Urbana	United States	Thunderbird Theatre ^{[A]}
May 18, 1998	Grand Rapids	United States	Orbit Room ^{[A]}
May 20, 1998	San Francisco	United States	Warfield Theatre
May 21, 1998	Los Angeles	United States	Palace
May 24, 1998	Toronto	Canada	Phoenix
May 26, 1998	Boston	United States	Avalon
May 27, 1998	Washington, D.C.	United States	9:30 Club
May 28, 1998	New York City	United States	Roseland Ballroom
Europe
June 1, 1998	Geleen	Netherlands	Pinkpop Festival
June 3, 1998	Paris	France	Le Zénith
June 4, 1998	London	United Kingdom	Brixton Academy
June 6, 1998	Newport	United Kingdom	Newport Centre
June 7, 1998	Manchester	United Kingdom	Apollo
June 8, 1998	Wolverhampton	United Kingdom	Civic Hall
June 9, 1998	Portsmouth	United Kingdom	Guildhall
June 11, 1998	Hultsfred	Sweden	Hultsfred Festival
June 13, 1998	Seinäjoki	Finland	Provinssirock Festival
June 16, 1998	Vienna	Austria	Libro Festival
June 17, 1998	Munich	Germany	Coliseum
June 18, 1998	Stuttgart	Germany	Kongresshalle
June 20, 1998	Sankt Goarshausen	Germany	Loreley Festival
June 21, 1998	Scheeßel	Germany	Hurricane Festival
June 23, 1998	Lisbon	Portugal	World Expo '98
June 26, 1998	Roskilde	Denmark	Roskilde Festival
June 28, 1998	St. Gallen	Switzerland	St. Gallen Festival
June 30, 1998	Berlin	Germany	Columbia Halle
July 1, 1998	Nuremberg	Germany	Forum
July 2, 1998	Nancy	France	Arena Festival
July 4, 1998	Torhout	Belgium	Tourhout Festival
July 5, 1998	Werchter	Belgium	Rock Werchter
July 7, 1998	Correggio	Italy	Festa de l'Unità
July 10, 1998	Pyrenees	Spain	Doctor Music Festival
July 11, 1998	Castlegar	Ireland	Big Day Out
July 12, 1998	Balado	United Kingdom	T in the Park
North America
July 24, 1998	Chicago	United States	Aragon Ballroom
Asia
August 1, 1998	Tokyo	Japan	Fuji Rock Festival
North America
August 23, 1998	Barrie	Canada	Summersault Festival
Europe
August 27, 1998	Glasgow	United Kingdom	Barrowland Ballroom
August 28, 1998	Glasgow	United Kingdom	Barrowland Ballroom
August 30, 1998	Reading	United Kingdom	Reading Festival
North America
September 17, 1998	Denver	United States	Mammoth Events Center
September 18, 1998	Salt Lake City	United States	Wasatch Events Center
September 20, 1998	Salem	United States	Armory
September 21, 1998	Vancouver	Canada	Plaza of Nations
September 22, 1998	Seattle	United States	Paramount Theatre
September 24, 1998	Davis	United States	Freeborn Hall
September 25, 1998	San Jose	United States	SJSU Event Center
September 26, 1998	West Hollywood	United States	Hollywood Palladium
September 28, 1998	West Hollywood	United States	Hollywood Palladium
September 30, 1998	Bakersfield	United States	Kern County Fair
October 1, 1998	La Jolla	United States	RIMAC Arena
October 2, 1998	Fresno	United States	Rainbow Ballroom
October 3, 1998	Santa Barbara	United States	Santa Barbara Bowl
October 5, 1998	Tempe	United States	Hayden Square
October 6, 1998	Las Vegas	United States	The Joint
October 8, 1998	Albuquerque	United States	The Zone
October 9, 1998	Las Cruces	United States	Pan American Center
October 11, 1998	Lubbock	United States	Pan Liquid 2000
October 12, 1998	Tulsa	United States	Cain's Ballroom
October 13, 1998	Oklahoma City	United States	Diamond Ballroom
October 15, 1998	Dallas	United States	Bronco Bowl
October 16, 1998	Austin	United States	Austin Music Hall
October 17, 1998	Houston	United States	Bayou Place
October 19, 1998	Tampa	United States	USF Special Events Center
October 20, 1998	Sunrise	United States	Sunrise Musical Theatre
October 21, 1998	Lake Buena Vista	United States	House of Blues
October 23, 1998	Atlanta	United States	Tabernacle
October 24, 1998	Raleigh	United States	The Ritz
October 25, 1998	Washington, D.C.	United States	Bender Arena
October 27, 1998	Philadelphia	United States	Electric Factory
October 28, 1998	Worcester	United States	The Palladium
October 30, 1998	New York City	United States	Roseland Ballroom
October 31, 1998	Asbury Park	United States	Paramount Theater
November 1, 1998	Providence	United States	Lupo's Heartbreak Hotel
November 3, 1998	South Hadley	United States	Chapin Theatre
November 5, 1998	Montreal	Canada	Metropolis
November 7, 1998	Kitchener	Canada	Lyric
November 8, 1998	Toronto	Canada	Warehouse
November 10, 1998	Cleveland	United States	Agora Theatre
November 12, 1998	Detroit	United States	State Theatre
November 13, 1998	Cincinnati	United States	Bogart's
November 14, 1998	Columbus	United States	Newport Music Hall
November 16, 1998	Kalamazoo	United States	State Theatre
November 17, 1998	Indianapolis	United States	Egyptian Theater
November 18, 1998	Madison	United States	Dane County Expo Center
November 20, 1998	Kansas City	United States	Memorial Hall
November 21, 1998	St. Louis	United States	American Theater
November 22, 1998	Omaha	United States	Sokol Hall
November 24, 1998	Milwaukee	United States	Eagles Ballroom
November 25, 1998	Chicago	United States	Riviera Nightclub
November 27, 1998	Minneapolis	United States	Orpheum Theater
November 28, 1998	Green Bay	United States	Weidner Center
North America^{[B]}
December 1, 1998	Boston	United States	The Avalon
December 2, 1998	Wallingford	United States	Oakdale Theatre
December 4, 1998	Philadelphia	United States	Electric Factory
December 5, 1998	Fairfax	United States	Patriot Center
December 6, 1998	Pittsburgh	United States	Metropol
December 8, 1998	Portland	United States	Memorial Coliseum
December 9, 1998	Seattle	United States	KeyArena
December 10, 1998	San Jose	United States	SJSU Event Center
December 12, 1998	Los Angeles	United States	Shrine Auditorium
December 15, 1998	Mexico City	Mexico	Teatro Metropolitan
December 18, 1998	Chicago	United States	Rosemont Horizon
December 19, 1998	Minneapolis	United States	Target Center
December 20, 1998	Detroit	United States	Joe Louis Arena
Europe
January 14, 1999	Dublin	Ireland	The Point
January 15, 1999	Belfast	United Kingdom	King's Hall
January 17, 1999	Birmingham	United Kingdom	N.E.C.
January 18, 1999	Doncaster	United Kingdom	The Dome
January 19, 1999	Reading	United Kingdom	Rivermead
January 20, 1999	London	United Kingdom	Wembley Arena
January 22, 1999	Manchester	United Kingdom	Evening News Arena
January 23, 1999	Glasgow	United Kingdom	SECC
January 25, 1999	Brussels	Belgium	Vorst Nationaal
January 26, 1999	Rotterdam	Netherlands	Ahoy
January 27, 1999	Paris	France	Le Zénith
January 29, 1999	Copenhagen	Denmark	Valby-Hallen
January 30, 1999	Gothenburg	Sweden	Liseberg Hall
January 31, 1999	Stockholm	Sweden	Annexet
February 2, 1999	Helsinki	Finland	Icehall
February 3, 1999	St. Petersburg	Russia	Yubileyny Sports Palace
February 7, 1999	Cologne	Germany	Palladium
February 8, 1999	Villeurbanne	France	Transbordeur
February 10, 1999	Barcelona	Spain	Zeleste
February 11, 1999	Madrid	Spain	La Riviera
North America^{[C]}
February 16, 1999	Cincinnati	United States	The Crown
February 18, 1999	Uniondale	United States	Nassau Coliseum
February 19, 1999	East Rutherford	United States	Continental Airlines Arena
February 21, 1999	State College	United States	Bryce Jordan Center
February 22, 1999	Boston	United States	FleetCenter
March 7, 1999	Minneapolis	United States	Target Center
March 9, 1999	Rosemont	United States	Rosemont Horizon
March 10, 1999	Auburn Hills	United States	Palace of Auburn Hills
March 11, 1999	Indianapolis	United States	Market Square Arena
March 14, 1999	St. Louis	United States	Kiel Center
March 15, 1999	Kansas City	United States	Kemper Arena
March 17, 1999	Dallas	United States	Reunion Arena
March 21, 1999	Phoenix	United States	Desert Sky Pavilion
March 23, 1999	Denver	United States	McNichols Arena
March 24, 1999	West Valley City	United States	E Center
March 26, 1999	Nampa	United States	Idaho Center
March 27, 1999	Yakima	United States	Yakima Valley SunDome
March 29, 1999	Seattle	United States	KeyArena
March 30, 1999	Portland	United States	Rose Garden
April 1, 1999	San Jose	United States	San Jose Arena
April 3, 1999	San Diego	United States	Cox Arena
April 4, 1999	Las Vegas	United States	House of Blues
April 6, 1999	Anaheim	United States	Arrowhead Pond
April 7, 1999	Los Angeles	United States	Universal Amphitheatre
Europe
May 19, 1999	Vienna	Austria	Libro Festival
May 20, 1999	Prague	Czech Republic	Zimní Stadion Eden
May 21, 1999	Nuremberg	Germany	Rock im Park Festival
May 22, 1999	Nürburgring	Germany	Rock am Ring Festival
May 24, 1999	Katowice	Poland	Spodek
May 28, 1999	Granada	Spain	Palacio de los Deportes
May 29, 1999	Murcia	Spain	Bullring
May 30, 1999	San Sebastián	Spain	Polideportivo Anoeta
June 13, 1999	Amsterdam	Netherlands	Tibetan Freedom Concert
Asia
June 15, 1999	Tel Aviv	Israel	Bitan 11
June 16, 1999	Tel Aviv	Israel	Bitan 11
June 17, 1999	Be'er Sheva	Israel	Be'er Sheva University
Europe
June 19, 1999	Imola	Italy	Heineken Jammin' Festival
June 22, 1999	Reykjavík	Iceland	Laugardalls Hall
July 1, 1999	Edinburgh	United Kingdom	The Garden Party
July 3, 1999	Groningen	Netherlands	nl:De Oosterpoort
July 6, 1999	Kristiansand	Norway	Quart Festival
July 9, 1999	Ringe	Denmark	Midtfyns Festival
July 10, 1999	Hamburg	Germany	Jazz & More Festival
July 11, 1999	Erfurt	Germany	Highfield Festival
July 14, 1999	Athens	Greece	Rockwave Festival
July 16, 1999	Istanbul	Turkey	Yapi Kredi Festival
July 17, 1999	Zeebrugge	Belgium	Axion Beach Festival
July 18, 1999	Lisbon	Portugal	Superbock Festival
July 20, 1999	Six-Fours-les-Plages	France	Les Voix Du Gaou Festival
July 21, 1999	Nyon	Switzerland	Paléo Festival
July 22, 1999	Singen	Germany	Hohentwiel Festival
July 24, 1999	Vannes	France	St. Noiffs
July 25, 1999	Duisburg	Germany	Warsteiner Festival
Africa
July 28, 1999	Johannesburg	South Africa	Standard Bank Arena
July 29, 1999	Johannesburg	South Africa	Standard Bank Arena
July 31, 1999	Cape Town	South Africa	3 Arts Theatre
August 2, 1999	Cape Town	South Africa	3 Arts Theatre
Oceania ^{[C]}
October 1, 1999	Auckland	New Zealand	Supertop
October 2, 1999	Brisbane	Australia	Livid Festival
October 3, 1999	Melbourne	Australia	The Palace
October 5, 1999	Perth	Australia	Entertainment Centre
October 7, 1999	Adelaide	Australia	Entertainment Centre
October 8, 1999	Melbourne	Australia	Melbourne Park
October 9, 1999	Melbourne	Australia	Melbourne Park
October 11, 1999	Sydney	Australia	National Indoor Stadium
October 13, 1999	Canberra	Australia	AIS Arena
October 14, 1999	Sydney	Australia	Entertainment Centre
October 15, 1999	Wollongong	Australia	Entertainment Centre
October 16, 1999	Newcastle	Australia	Entertainment Centre
North America
October 20, 1999	Denver	United States	Magness Arena
October 22, 1999	Macomb	United States	Western Hall
October 23, 1999	Chicago	United States	Mandel Hall
October 24, 1999	Warrensburg	United States	UCM Multipurpose Building
October 25, 1999	Terre Haute	United States	Hulman Center
October 27, 1999	Murray	United States	Events Center
October 28, 1999	Huntington	United States	Civic Arena
October 29, 1999	Bethlehem	United States	Stabler Arena
October 30, 1999	Delhi	United States	Floyd L. Maines Arena
November 2, 1999	Indiana	United States	Memorial Field House
November 3, 1999	Syracuse	United States	Goldstein Auditorium
November 4, 1999	Newark	United States	Bob Carpenter Center
November 5, 1999	Binghamton	United States	University Events Center
November 7, 1999	Clarion	United States	Waldo S. Tippon Gymnasium
November 9, 1999	Blacksburg	United States	Burruss Hall
November 10, 1999	Charlotte	United States	Halton Arena
November 12, 1999	Jacksonville	United States	UNF Arena
November 14, 1999	New Orleans	United States	McAlister Auditorium
November 16, 1999	Dallas	United States	Starplex Amphitheatre
November 17, 1999	Nacogdoches	United States	William R. Johnson Coliseum
November 20, 1999	Tucson	United States	Centennial Hall
November 22, 1999	San Luis Obispo	United States	Cal Poly Events Center
November 23, 1999	San Diego	United States	RIMAC Arena
November 24, 1999	Irvine	United States	Bren Events Center

Festival and others miscellaneous performances

^{A} Performing as "Stupid Girl"
^{B} Radio festival performances
^{C} Supporting Alanis Morissette on The Junkie tour

a Garbage's equipment was held at the Russian-Estonian border by customs, and the show was cancelled at the last minute. Garbage appeared on Estonian news programmes criticising the Russian customs, and promised the show would be rescheduled
b Garbage had announced the above four dates on March 25, 1999, as part of that year's European summer schedule, including a show in Estonia, but by April 16 were cancelled on the advice of the U.S. Embassy due to concerns caused by the NATO bombing of the Federal Republic of Yugoslavia during the Kosovo War. The U.S. Embassy had felt there was "Anti-American sentiment in some areas". The dates were not rescheduled.

Cancellations and rescheduled shows

February 4, 1999	Tallinn	Estonia	Linnahall	Cancelled
May 26, 1999	Vilnius	Lithuania	Dinamo Stadium	Cancelled
May 27, 1999	Riga	Latvia	Mezaparks	Cancelled
May 29, 1999	St. Petersburg	Russia	Kirov Stadium	Cancelled

== Box office score data ==
Date	Show	Venue	City	Tickets sold / available	Gross revenue
February 18, 1999	Alanis Morissette/Garbage	Nassau Coliseum	Uniondale, New York	8,932 / 10,000 (89%)	$280,568
February 19, 1999	Alanis Morissette/Garbage	Continental Airlines Arena	East Rutherford, New Jersey	12,117 / 12,500 (97%)	$385,945

== Promotional performances ==
Date	Show	Set
June 2, 1998	Nulle Part Ailleurs	"I Think I'm Paranoid", "Push It"
June 5, 1998	TFI Friday	"I Think I'm Paranoid"
July 17, 1998	Top of the Pops	"I Think I'm Paranoid", "Special"
Sept 4, 1998	Pepsi Chart Show	"Special", "When I Grow Up"
Sept 5, 1998	MTV Europe	"I Think I'm Paranoid", "Special", "You Look So Fine"
Sept 5, 1998	TFI Friday	"Special"
Sept 28, 1998	KROQ-FM Breakfast with Garbage	"Special", "Vow", "Thirteen", "I Think I'm Paranoid", "Only Happy When it Rains" (acoustic set)
Oct 26, 1998	Sonic Session	"I Think I'm Paranoid", "Only Happy When It Rains", "Thirteen", "Special", "Vow" (acoustic set)
Oct 29, 1998	The Late Show	"Special"
Oct 30, 1998	The Howard Stern Show	"#1 Crush" (semi-acoustic)
Nov 6, 1998	MusiquePlus	"I Think I'm Paranoid", "Special", "Stupid Girl", "Vow", "Push It", "Only Happy When it Rains", "You Look So Fine", "Milk", "When I Grow Up"
Nov 29, 1998	Modern rock Live	Live set
Dec 11, 1998	The Tonight Show	"Special"
Jan 21, 1999	Friday Night's All Wright	"When I Grow Up"
Jan 28, 1999	Nulle Part Ailleurs	"Special", "The Trick is to Keep Breathing" (acoustic set)
Feb 5, 1999	Top of The Pops	"When I Grow Up"
March 1, 1999	El séptimo de caballería	"Special", "The Trick is to Keep Breathing", "Only Happy When it Rains" (acoustic set)
March 20, 1999	Saturday Night Live	"Special", "When I Grow Up"
April 2, 1999	The Tonight Show	"Special"
May 15, 1999	Later... with Jools Holland	"I Think I'm Paranoid", "You Look So Fine", "Only Happy When it Rains"
May 29, 1999	Música sí	"When I Grow Up", "You Look So Fine"
June 3, 1999	Gala Regazza	"You Look So Fine"
June 4, 1999	Top of the Pops	"You Look So Fine"
June 5, 1999	Evening Session	"You Look So Fine", "Medication", "Sleep Together", "I Think I'm Paranoid"
June 11, 1999	TFI Friday	"You Look So Fine"
Oct 12, 1999	Hey Hey It's Saturday	"When I Grow Up"
Nov 1, 1999	The Late Show	"The World Is Not Enough"
