= Version 2.0 =

Studio album by Garbage
- Released: May 11, 1998
- Recorded: March 1997 – February 1998
- Studio: Smart (Madison, Wisconsin)
- Genres: Alternative rock; synth-rock
- Length: 49:34
- Label: Mushroom
- Producer: Garbage

Garbage chronology
Garbage (1995)	Version 2.0 (1998)	Beautiful Garbage (2001)

Singles from Version 2.0
- 1. "Push It" Released: April 20, 1998; 2. "I Think I'm Paranoid" Released: July 6, 1998; 3. "Special" Released: October 5, 1998; 4. "When I Grow Up" Released: January 25, 1999; 5. "The Trick Is to Keep Breathing" Released: February 15, 1999 (EU); 6. "You Look So Fine" Released: May 24, 1999

Version 2.0 is the second studio album by American rock band Garbage. It was released on May 11, 1998, by Mushroom Records worldwide, with the North American release on Almo Sounds the following day. With this album, the band aimed to improve and expand upon the style of their 1995 eponymous debut rather than reinventing their sound. Lead singer Shirley Manson wrote dark, introspective lyrics, which she felt complemented the songs' melodies.

Version 2.0 was a commercial success, topping the charts in the United Kingdom, France, and New Zealand, and earning platinum certifications in several countries. The album has sold 1.7 million copies in the United States and four million copies worldwide. Garbage embarked on an 18-month-long world tour, and released a string of commercially successful singles backed with innovative music videos. Version 2.0 received generally positive reviews from critics, and was included on year-end lists of 1998's best albums by several publications. In 1999, it was nominated for Grammy Awards for Album of the Year and Best Rock Album. The album's third single "Special" was further nominated the following year for Best Rock Song and for Best Rock Performance by a Duo or Group.

== Recording ==
I don't think we have ever felt we know where we are going. Songs are an on-going process. It's hard to find a point when it's done. The only thing that makes us stop is time and people start yelling to finish.

— Steve Marker

Garbage began writing their second album, which would go under the working title of Sad Alcoholic Clowns, in March 1997 in the band's label head Jerry Moss's vacation house in Friday Harbor, Washington. The group demoed and made rough outlines for new songs. When they felt they had made a good start, Garbage took the work they made in Washington back to their Madison, Wisconsin, base at Smart Studios and begin fleshing out the ideas and rough sketches over the following year. The group recorded all of their work for the second album through a 48-track digital system digitally, direct to hard drives utilizing a 24-bit Pro Tools rig. While only one recorder was up in the early sessions, eventually another was installed to edit, and ultimately a third so Manson could record vocals while the other members fiddled with recordings. Band member Butch Vig estimated that the sample collage approach led them to "probably have five albums' worth of music", and songs featuring up to 120 audio tracks. After the digital file was ready, mixing was done in an analog tape deck, which held only 14 tracks.

Much of the percussion was recorded in a disused candy factory located in Madison; Vig, Steve Marker and sound engineer Billy Bush set up a drum kit within the factory and recorded various fills, utilizing the acoustics of the dilapidated building. Forced to stop after local police officers responded to complaints about the noise, some of the percussion was later incorporated into "Temptation Waits", "I Think I'm Paranoid" and "Hammering in My Head".

Garbage completed recording by December 1997, as Manson wanted to return to her family in Scotland for Christmas, and asked her bandmates to just move onto the mixing. Vig added that otherwise more time would be spent recording, and "it was kind of scary—because we had to commit to what these songs were going to become." Production was done until mid-February 1998. The eventual title, Version 2.0, was a tongue-in-cheek take on how computers were heavily involved in the album's production, with Manson adding that "in the studio, at any given moment, someone would come in and find the four of us in front of the screen."

== Composition and style ==
Building on framework sound and style Garbage established on their debut set, Version 2.0 features musical references to the 1960s, 1970s, and 1980s, songs featuring live strings, over 100 recorded tracks, and an interpolation of the Beach Boys and The Pretenders. The band said that the goal of Version 2.0 was to create a "rapprochement between the high-tech and low-down, the now sound and of golden memories." Butch Vig stated that the band did not want to reinvent their sound, as they "felt that we had carved our own turf on the first record and we wanted to take everything we did and make it better". This meant to "have the guitars noisier and write poppier melodies", showing how the band had grown together: "With Garbage, we were struggling to find an identity and to get comfortable with Shirley – and vice versa. After touring so much, there's a better camaraderie and sense of communication."

Shirley Manson declared that "we didn't want to totally embrace the world of electronica", so Version 2.0 juxtaposed "the super-hi-fi with the super-organic". The band wanted there to be echoes of music they like in the record, "and that means not just Björk and Portishead and Radiohead but the Beatles and Beach Boys and Frank Sinatra", Manson said, concluding that the album is overall "more diverse—it goes to extremes." The increased usage of techno beats emerged from frequent exposure to electronic music during the Garbage tour, both in clubs and listening to The Prodigy and The Chemical Brothers. Steve Marker stated that the band used as a reference point the Garbage song "As Heaven Is Wide", "but with a more technoey [sic] and dance end." The band also aimed to channel some of the energy of their live shows into the rhythm parts of the album. Vig remarked that "the songs sound looser, tougher" that way, as by the last concerts, "we'd speeded things up and toughened up a lot of the grooves" and in the album "we wanted that to be apparent from the get-go."

While Garbage had lyrical input from all band members, Manson was responsible for all the lyrics in Version 2.0. Consequently, it was described by Manson as "more direct and more personal than the first. I was able to verbalize things a little clearer this time—I mean, I'm no Nick Cave, I'm never gonna be Bob Dylan. I do what I can to express myself." The singer "tried to let the darker undercurrents come through to offset some of the pop melodies", adding that "like human beings, songs shouldn't be one-dimensional". The singer declared that the introspective nature of Version 2.0 served to "reassure myself while I'm going crazy" due to her experiences during production, as she was "living by myself in a hotel, and I had no one to really talk to" and every day coming back by herself really late after working in the studio. Manson added that only "The Trick Is to Keep Breathing" had something that was out of her life, being inspired by her friend Ruthie Trouble. "Medication" came about from a frightful, isolating experience with the US medical system. The song, Manson explained, is "a reflection on past ills in a way ... about taking blame on yourself for things that you had no control of at the time, and finally pushing off and realizing that this was not my fault. It wasn't all my fault. There's a huge relief and release that comes from that".

== Release and promotion ==
I think the general consensus was that people feel our second record didn't do as well as the first one, but our second record did better. But I think in terms of our profile, I think our profile was probably quieter than on our first record.

— Shirley Manson

The entire visual campaign for Version 2.0 was tailored to play off the album cover artwork, the icons designed to represent each single release, provided point-of-sale and the band's videogenic sensibility. Garbage spent three weeks in Europe providing interviews with music journalists from a multitude of territories, while Manson continued on her own to Australia and Asia.

Version 2.0 was released in Japan on May 4, 1998, a week ahead of the international street date, to counteract parallel imports. The album was released in two editions, a standard album with a bonus remix of "Push It" by Boom Boom Satellites and a limited run of 20,000 copies featuring two international B-sides, "Lick the Pavement" and a cover version of Big Star's "Thirteen". Version 2.0 debuted at number four in the Japanese international album chart.

On May 11, Version 2.0 was released worldwide, with the North American street date a day later. Mushroom Records released the album in the United Kingdom on CD, LP and cassette. In North America, Version 2.0 was released on CD and cassette by Almo Sounds in partnership with Interscope Records, who shipped 500,000 copies to stores in the first week.

== Tour ==
Preceding the start of their world tour, Garbage played three shows in the Midwest under the alias Stupid Girl. The Version 2.0 World Tour officially kicked off with club dates starting at San Francisco's Warfield Theatre on May 20, 1998, and took the band to a number of cities in the United States and Canada. Garbage then travelled to Europe to play a number of rock festivals beginning June 1 at Netherlands' Pinkpop and wrapping up at Scotland's T in the Park on July 12. In between the festivals, Garbage performed some headlining shows in France and the United Kingdom, with support coming from The Crystal Method. In August, the band travelled to Japan to perform on the bill at the Fuji Rock Festival, and then back to Scotland to perform at two "warm up" shows at Glasgow's Barrowland Ballroom and then headlining the last night of the Reading Festival.

Garbage returned to North America on September 17, to start a three-month tour. Support came from Girls Against Boys. The itinerary took the band from Denver, up the West Coast as far north as Vancouver, before routing towards the Southern states. Following these dates, the tour moved up the Eastern Seaboard and into Quebec and Ontario, before finishing up in the Midwest on November 28 in Green Bay, Wisconsin. During December, Garbage performed at radio shows on both coasts, including KROQ-FM's Almost Acoustic Christmas, and made a visit to Mexico City before wrapping up on December 20 in Detroit.

Continuing their touring commitment into 1999, Garbage launched a European arena tour on January 14 at Dublin's Point Theatre. Local acts such as Laurent Garnier and The Rasmus supported continental dates; Moloko supported Irish and UK shows. Concerts in Paris and St. Petersburg were filmed to be broadcast by MTV Europe and MTV Russia, respectively. A show in Tallinn was cancelled on the day when the band's equipment was held up by customs officials at the Estonian border. The European run ended in Madrid on February 11. Garbage then returned to North America to support Alanis Morissette on two legs of her Junkie Tour, starting on February 16 in Cincinnati, routing along the Midwest, Four Corners states and onto the West Coast, ending on April 7 in Los Angeles.

Garbage revisited Europe to play a second summer of rock festivals, beginning with Vienna's Libro on May 19. The shows included visits to Israel and Iceland, although four concerts in the Baltic States and Russia were cancelled on the advice of the American Embassy due to the US's involvement in Kosovo. Garbage headlined a special show to mark the opening of the Scottish Parliament in Edinburgh on July 1. The European dates conclude in Duisburg on July 25. Garbage then travelled to South Africa to play four shows with Placebo.

The final legs of the Version 2.0 tour see Garbage moving on to New Zealand and Australia to co-headline with Alanis Morissette, beginning in Auckland for 16 days from October 1, and ending in Newcastle. During this time the band also performed at the Livid festival. Garbage returned to North America to wind down the tour by headlining a series of shows organised by MTV on university campuses. Titled the Campus Invasion Tour, and supported by Lit, the shows began on October 20 in Denver and is routed through the Midwest, North East and Southern States, Arizona and California. The final date of the Version 2.0 tour is held in Irvine, California, on November 24.

== Critical reception ==
Professional ratings
Review scores
Source	Rating
The Age	4/4 stars
AllMusic	4.5/5 stars
The Baltimore Sun	3/4 stars
Entertainment Weekly	B+
NME	6/10
Pitchfork	9.0/10
Rolling Stone	4/5 stars
Spin	8/10
The Times	6/10
The Village Voice	A−

Version 2.0 received critical acclaim. In a review for Time magazine, Christopher John Farley found its music exceptional because of songs that are gloomy and sexual yet lively and introspective, while J. D. Considine of The Baltimore Sun said the album is a more melodic version of the approach exhibited on Garbage, and commended the songwriting and Manson's multifaceted singing. Chicago Tribune critic Greg Kot believed its mix of pop and electronica has an "ersatz charm", while the noisy production retains Garbage's tuneful hooks. Barry Walters of Spin felt the songs are better developed than on the band's debut, while showcasing their passionate, avant-garde sounds and Manson's personalized yet relatable lyrics. According to Jim Farber of Entertainment Weekly, Manson's vocal presence elevates the unexpected sounds and makes the songs "more than just clever exercises in avant-pop". Rob Sheffield, writing in Rolling Stone, said the songwriting has improved, but Manson remains the highlight, her seductive, emotive singing evoking new wave greats and appropriating the band's complex sounds into a well-crafted, original rock album. Donna Freydkin of CNN commended the album for enhancing, not departing from, the style of the debut, and praised the amalgam of sounds and Manson's "clever, biting lyrics". In a column for The Village Voice, Robert Christgau concluded that the metallic, discordant music suits Manson's aggressive sexuality and allows listeners to experience sadomasochism vicariously through "12 impregnable theoretical hits". Jane Rocca of The Age praised it as a "personality loaded" sonic spectacle and concluded that it "salutes the new millennium with futuristic nuance". Billboard writer Paul Verna said the group has expanded the possibilities on an impressive upgrade to their debut. John Pecorelli of CMJ New Music Monthly felt that the album noticeably deviates from the style of Garbage as it is more melodious, more saturated, and features enhanced percussion, while its lyrical themes make it arguably more subversive.

Other reviewers lamented Manson's singing and the production effects. Brett Milano conceded in Stereo Review that Garbage can produce hooky songs, but felt Manson showed limited "emotional range" as she sang in no other way but "sexy". Newsweek's David Gates was critical of the samples and what he believed to be "space-age wheeps" and "calculated showbiz shtik" in the music. Danny Eccleston of The Times facetiously remarked "it's bin done" in reference to the similar approach used on Garbage. Stephen Dalton of NME called the album a lifeless, "beautiful engineered piece of modern design" and believed Manson's lyrics to be its weakness, criticizing a directness and shortage of wit. Melissa Bobbitt of The About Group was more enthusiastic in a retrospective on important 1990s rock records by female artists. She argued that Manson's intimidating and alluring style, the singular electronic rock sound, and the feminist stance on Version 2.0 were innovative at the time, but these elements also embodied "the futuristic path music and technology were racing toward" and can be heard throughout modern popular music. Reviewer Neil Z. Yeung also praised the album in his re-evaluation for AllMusic, calling Version 2.0 "Balanced and taut" and "a greatest-hits collection packaged as a regular album, [that is] not only a peak in Garbage's catalog, but one of the definitive releases of the late '90s."

=== Accolades ===
Version 2.0 was voted the 19th best album of 1998 in the Pazz & Jop, an annual critics poll run by The Village Voice. It was included in year-end best-album lists by The Guardian, Q, Kerrang!, Melody Maker, NME, Select, Spin, Gear, Mojo and Music Week. It was the seventh and 18th highest rated album by Spin and Rolling Stone, respectively. Version 2.0 was Canada's largest modern rock station, The Edge 102's number-one album, while three tracks make Australia's Triple J Hottest 100 annual poll: "I Think I'm Paranoid" (at number 57), "Push It" (number 87), and "Special" (number 89).

On July 14, the video for "Push It" was nominated for eight MTV Video Music Awards (for Best Group Video, Best Alternative Video, Best Breakthrough Video, Best Art Direction, Best Editing, Best Cinematography, Best Direction and Best Special Effects), coming second to Madonna's "Ray of Light" video which received nine. On October 1, Garbage were nominated for three MTV Europe Music Awards: Best Group, Best Rock Act, and Best Video for "Push It".

On January 5, 1999, Version 2.0 was nominated for Grammy Awards for Album of the Year and Best Rock Album. "Push It" was nominated for Best Alternative Record at Winter Music Conference. Garbage performed "You Look So Fine" for Gala Ragazza in Madrid on June 3.

On September 9, 1999, the video for "Special" won Best Special Effects at the MTV Video Music Awards. "Special" received Grammy nominations for Best Rock Song and for Best Rock Performance by a Duo or Group.

== Commercial performance ==
Version 2.0 debuted at number 13 on the US Billboard 200, selling 88,000 copies in its first week. As of August 2008, the album had sold 1.7 million copies in the United States. In the United Kingdom, the album debuted at number one on the UK Albums Chart, with first-week sales of 31,476 copies. It had sold 579,912 copies in the UK by May 2012. Elsewhere, Version 2.0 topped the charts in France and New Zealand, while reaching the top five in Australia, Austria, Belgium, Canada, Germany, Ireland, Norway, and Portugal.

The album received its first gold discs on May 22, 1998, in the UK, Belgium, France and New Zealand, and by early October, it was certified platinum in New Zealand, Canada, and the UK, and certified gold in the United States, Australia, and seven European countries. It was eventually certified platinum by the Recording Industry Association of America (RIAA) on February 24, 1999. During the week of March 8, 1999, Version 2.0 was officially awarded the European Platinum Award by the International Federation of the Phonographic Industry (IFPI) for sales of one million copies across Europe.

On June 3, 1999, Version 2.0 was certified platinum in Spain, and claimed the fifth-longest chart run on the Spanish Albums Chart on June 20, while an airplay-only single, "Temptation Waits", was released to Spanish radio. The album's sales continued into 2000; it was certified platinum in the UK for the second time on February 11, 2000, before re-charting in the UK for the final time on July 15, 2000. As of May 2018, Version 2.0 had sold four million copies worldwide.

== Track listing ==
All tracks are written by Garbage, except where noted.

Version 2.0 track listing
No.	Title	Length
1.	"Temptation Waits"	4:36
2.	"I Think I'm Paranoid"	3:38
3.	"When I Grow Up"	3:23
4.	"Medication"	4:06
5.	"Special"	3:43
6.	"Hammering in My Head"	4:52
7.	"Push It"	4:02
8.	"The Trick Is to Keep Breathing"	4:11
9.	"Dumb"	3:50
10.	"Sleep Together"	4:03
11.	"Wicked Ways"	3:43
12.	"You Look So Fine"	5:25
Total length:		49:34

Version 2.0 (Deluxe Edition) (20th Anniversary Edition) - CD 2
No.	Title	Originally from	Length
1.	"Can't Seem to Make You Mine" (Sky Saxon)	"When I Grow Up" and "The Trick is to Keep Breathing" singles	2:55
2.	"13x Forever"	"Special" single	3:55
3.	"Deadwood"	"I Think I'm Paranoid" single	4:22
4.	"Get Busy With the Fizzy"	"You Look So Fine" single	2:55
5.	"Soldier Through This"	"You Look So Fine" single	3:48
6.	"Thirteen" (Alex Chilton, Chris Bell)	"Push It" single	3:30
7.	"Lick The Pavement"	"Push It" single	2:42
8.	"Medication" (Acoustic)	"Special" single	4:11
9.	"Tornado"	"When I Grow Up" and "The Trick is to Keep Breathing" singles	3:42
10.	"Afterglow"	"I Think I'm Paranoid" single	2:31
Total length:			34:11

Version 2.0 - The Official Remixes (2018) - Digital
No.	Title	Length
1.	"Push It" (Boom Boom Satellites Mix)	6:42
2.	"Push It" (Victor Calderone Club Mix)	7:19
3.	"Push It" (Victor Calderone Dub Mix)	3:41
4.	"I Think I'm Crystalized" (The Crystal Method Extended Edit)	7:26
5.	"I Think I'm Crystalized" (The Crystal Method Dub Mix)	5:17
6.	"I Think I'm Paranoid" (Purity Mix)	5:30
7.	"Special" (Brothers In Rhythm Mix)	10:00
8.	"Special" (Pop Mix)	3:39
9.	"When I Grow Up" (Danny Tenaglia Golden Shower Dub Mix)	9:16
10.	"When I Grow Up" (Danny Tenaglia Club Mix)	11:07
11.	"When I Grow Up" (Alt Pop Mix)	3:35
12.	"Special" (Rickidy Raw Raw R+B Mix)	3:25
13.	"Special" (Rickidy Raw Late Night Mix)	4:00
14.	"You Look So Fine" (Eric Kupper Deep Drama Remix)	8:39
15.	"You Look So Fine" (Eric Kupper Deep Drama Dub Mix)	8:39
16.	"You Look So Fine" (Fun Lovin' Criminals Remix)	3:39
Total length:		1:43:05

Notes

- "Push It" contains an interpolation of "Don't Worry Baby", written by Brian Wilson and Roger Christian, and "Push It", written by Hurby Azor.

== Personnel ==
Credits adapted from the liner notes of Version 2.0.

Garbage

- Duke Erikson
- Shirley Manson
- Steve Marker
- Butch Vig

Additional musicians

- Daniel Shulman – bass
- Michael Masley – cymbalom
- Todd Malcolm Michiles – record scratching
- Jon J. Vriesacker – violin

Technical

- Garbage – production
- Billy Bush – engineering
- Mike Zirkel – engineering assistance
- Scott Hull – mastering
- Howie Weinberg – mastering

Artwork

- Garbage – art direction
- Ade Britteon – design
- Michael Faherty – 3D
- Stéphane Sednaoui – band photograph

== Charts ==
=== Weekly charts ===
Weekly chart performance for Version 2.0
Chart (1998–1999)	Peak position
Australian Albums (ARIA)	5
Austrian Albums (Ö3 Austria)	4
Belgian Albums (Ultratop Flanders)	3
Belgian Albums (Ultratop Wallonia)	2
Canadian Albums (Billboard)	2
Danish Albums (Hitlisten)	7
Dutch Albums (Album Top 100)	22
European Albums (Music & Media)	1
Finnish Albums (Suomen virallinen lista)	6
French Albums (SNEP)	1
German Albums (Offizielle Top 100)	4
Icelandic Albums (Tónlist)	2
Irish Albums (IRMA)	4
Italian Albums (FIMI)	20
Japanese Albums (Oricon)	27
New Zealand Albums (RMNZ)	1
Norwegian Albums (VG-lista)	4
Portuguese Albums (AFP)	4
Scottish Albums (Official Charts)	1
Spanish Albums (AFYVE)	23
Swedish Albums (Sverigetopplistan)	12
Swiss Albums (Schweizer Hitparade)	17
UK Albums (Official Charts)	1
UK Independent Albums (Official Charts)	1
US Billboard 200	13

=== Year-end charts ===
1998 year-end chart performance for Version 2.0
Chart (1998)	Position
Australian Albums (ARIA)	81
Belgian Albums (Ultratop Flanders)	42
Belgian Albums (Ultratop Wallonia)	32
Canada Top Albums/CDs (RPM)	58
Dutch Albums (Album Top 100)	95
European Albums (Music & Media)	32
French Albums (SNEP)	48
German Albums (Offizielle Top 100)	67
New Zealand Albums (RMNZ)	29
UK Albums (OCC)	43
US Billboard 200	118

1999 year-end chart performance for Version 2.0
Chart (1999)	Position
Australian Albums (ARIA)	94
UK Albums (OCC)	68
US Billboard 200	131

== Certifications and sales ==
Certifications and sales for Version 2.0
Region	Certification	Certified units/sales
Australia (ARIA)	Platinum	70,000^{^}
Belgium (BRMA)	Gold	25,000^{*}
Canada (Music Canada)	Platinum	100,000^{^}
France (SNEP)	2× Gold	410,000
New Zealand (RMNZ)	Platinum	15,000^{^}
Spain (Promusicae)	Platinum	100,000^{^}
Sweden (GLF)	Gold	40,000^{^}
United Kingdom (BPI)	2× Platinum	579,912
United States (RIAA)	Platinum	1,700,000
Summaries
Europe (IFPI)	Platinum	1,000,000^{*}
Worldwide	—N/a	4,000,000
^{*} Sales figures based on certification alone.^{^} Shipments figures based on certification alone.
