= You Look So Fine =

1999 single by Garbage

Single by Garbage

from the album Version 2.0
- B-side: "Get Busy with the Fizzy"; "Soldier Through This"
- Released: May 24, 1999
- Recorded: January–February 1998
- Studio: Smart Studios, Madison, Wisconsin
- Genre: Trip-hop
- Length: 5:21 (album version); 3:50 (video/single version)
- Label: Mushroom Records UK
- Songwriter: Garbage
- Producer: Garbage

Garbage singles chronology
| "The Trick Is to Keep Breathing" (1999) | "You Look So Fine" (1999) | "The World Is Not Enough" (1999) |

"You Look So Fine" is a single released in 1999, and was the final single taken from Garbage's second album Version 2.0, where it was also the closing track. "You Look So Fine" closed either the main set or encore at every headlining show Garbage performed on the two-year-long Version 2.0 World Tour.

The release of the single was promoted by a torch song version arranged by Fun Lovin' Criminals, on which singer Shirley Manson performed a new vocal. The new version was part of a remix trade between both bands, where Garbage remixed Fun Lovin' Criminals single "Korean Bodega" in reciprocation.

In 2007, "You Look So Fine" was remastered and included on Garbage's greatest hits album Absolute Garbage, and was included on their 2022 greatest hits album Anthology.

== Song profile ==
"You Look So Fine" was written, recorded and mixed at Smart Studios in Madison, Wisconsin towards the end of their year-long sessions for Version 2.0. The track began as a basic vocal/acoustic guitar/piano composition. Elements from a scrapped track titled "King of Crime" were repurposed for "You Look So Fine". Butch Vig described the song as his favourite track from Version 2.0 citing its "Carpenters covers Sonic Youth quality"

When Garbage had printed what they presumed was the final mix of the song, Manson had the idea to add an orchestral outro section to the song after returning to the studio from a screening of the movie Titanic. "I was kind of rattled because I thought the movie was shit... I came back to the studio [as the boys were working on "You Look So Fine"] and I was all grumpy about it." Manson felt that even though it was very late at night, and the rest of the band were tired, that they instinctively knew that her suggestion was a good idea. "We knew "You Look So Fine" was going to be the last track, with a slightly cinematic feel", Erikson explained, "but the ending almost sets you up for what's going to happen next..."

"You Look So Fine" was first performed live on May 15, 1998 in Combined Locks, Wisconsin on the first date of the Version 2.0 tour. In advance of the song's single release in late 1998, Garbage performed the song live for MTV Europe and MusiquePlus.

== Remix trade ==
At the end of 1998, Garbage arranged for a remix trade between themselves and New York City hip-hop group Fun Lovin' Criminals. Both bands had toured Germany together a few years prior. Garbage reworked "Korean Bodega" from their 100% Colombian album, recording new instrumentation beneath the group's vocal. On the chorus, Manson added her own backing vocal. At the time, Garbage were on a three-month concert tour of North America; the remix was recorded in available locker and dressing rooms the band had access to, directly onto Pro Tools. Fun Lovin Criminals reworked "You Look So Fine" into a lounge standard. Garbage booked studio time at Rondor Studios in Los Angeles to record a new vocal for the new version. While there, the band also wrote and recorded two brand new tracks for B-side use, "Get Busy with the Fizzy" and "Soldier Through This" with their touring bass player Daniel Shulman.

Chrysalis Records issued "Korean Bodega" as a single across Europe on April 26, 1999. The Garbage version (titled "Aero Mexicana remix") featured on the A-side to one CD single and on the cassette formats. A week later, "Korean Bodega" debuted as the band's second biggest hit at #15 on the UK Singles Chart. All of the press advertising for the release of "Korean Bodega" heavily mentioned Garbage's remix and the fact that Shirley Manson had contributed vocals to the new version. Synching both releases up, a database mail-out to Fun Lovin' Criminals fans was sent to promote "You Look So Fine", while a mail out for "Korean Bodega" was sent to Garbage fans. "Korean Bodega" spent three weeks on the UK charts.

== Single release ==
Both the original and Fun Lovin' Criminals versions of "You Look So Fine" were serviced to radio in the United Kingdom and Ireland at the beginning of May 1999. The final single from the album would also serve to end the album promotion in the United Kingdom after launching the release of Version 2.0 Special Live Edition, a limited edition repackage with a bonus disc of four tracks recorded live at the Roskilde Festival in Denmark, and would support the announcement of Garbage's last UK date on the Version 2.0 tour. "You Look So Fine" was A-listed at XFM, GLR and Capital, B-listed at Radio One, C-listed at Virgin and playlisted by a further 56 regional radio stations becoming the #6 Most Added song at radio by the middle of the month. Pre-release club mixes of "You Look So Fine" produced by Eric Kupper peaked at #20 on the Club Charts. Setting up television and radio promotion for the single, Garbage performed "You Look So Fine" along with "I Think I'm Paranoid" and "Only Happy When it Rains" on Later With Jools Holland, recorded a four-track session for Radio One and filmed interviews for Videotech and cd:uk; Shirley also took part on the panel of the Jo Whiley Show.

Mushroom Records issued "You Look So Fine" to record stores on May 24 on a two CD single set and a cassette single. The first CD and the cassette both featured "Get Busy with the Fizzy" while the CD also included the club mix by Eric Kupper. The second CD single was backed with "Soldier Through This" and the Fun Lovin' Criminals rework. After a week on sale, "You Look So Fine" debuted at #19 on the UK singles chart. This was Garbage's eighth straight Top 20 single. The same week, the band's debut album Garbage shot back into the top 50 of the UK Album Chart peaking at #44 (its highest position since the previous August). At the start of June, Garbage followed up the chart position of "You Look So Fine" by performing the song on both Top of The Pops and TFI Friday. On June 7, the Version 2.0 repackage was issued to record stores on the same date that "You Look So Fine" was released as the final collectable 3" CD Blisterpack from the album, collecting together all of the singles bonus tracks. Seven days later, Version 2.0 recharted at #38 and subsequently climbed to #27 the following week. "You Look So Fine" ultimately spent four weeks on the UK Singles Chart, leaving the top seventy-five at the end of June.

On May 25, the day after the UK release, "You Look So Fine", was released via BMG across Europe as both a CD maxi and a card sleeved single CD. In France, the single had been serviced to Radio Campus Paris and music video playlisted by TV channels MCM and M6 from May 20. Ouï FM supported the release of the single by broadcasting live recordings of the band performing at Roskilde Festival. Garbage perform "You Look So Fine" and "When I Grow Up" on Si Musica on May 29; and performed "You Look So Fine" for Gala Ragazza in Madrid, on June 3 as Version 2.0 is certified platinum in Spain. To mark the certification, RCA issue both "You Look So Fine" and "Temptation Waits" to Spanish radio stations. "You Look So Fine" peaks at #15 on the Spanish singles chart, while also reaching #26 on the airplay chart. "Temptation Waits" peaks at #39.

On December 6, 1999, Festival Mushroom Records issued "You Look So Fine" in Australia. Version 2.0 had re-entered the ARIA Album Chart top ten a month earlier, a year and a half after its original release, thanks to the success of earlier single "When I Grow Up" and the Australian release of the album's bonus disc repackage. The single was issued as a maxi-CD backed with "Get Busy with the Fizzy" and both mixes of the title track. "You Look So Fine" just failed to make the Australian ARIA Top 100 Singles chart, peaking at #101.

== Track listings ==
- UK cassette single Mushroom MUSH49MCS
- Europe CD single BMG 74321 65744 2
1. "You Look So Fine" – 3:50
2. "Get Busy with the Fizzy" – 2:55
- UK 12" LP commercial promo TRASH 31
1. "You Look So Fine" (Eric Kupper Deep Drama Mix) – 8:40
- UK CD1 Mushroom MUSH49CDS
1. "You Look So Fine" – 3:50
2. "Get Busy with the Fizzy" – 2:55
3. "You Look So Fine" (Eric Kupper's Deep Drama mix) – 8:40
- UK CD2 Mushroom MUSH49CDSX
1. "You Look So Fine" – 3:50
2. "Soldier Through This" – 3:47
3. "You Look So Fine" (Fun Lovin' Criminals version) – 3:36
- UK 3" CD single Mushroom MUSH49CDSXXX
1. "You Look So Fine" – 3:50
2. "Get Busy with the Fizzy" – 2:55
3. "Soldier Through This" – 3:47
4. "You Look So Fine" (Fun Lovin' Criminals version) – 3:36
5. "You Look So Fine" (Eric Kupper's Deep Drama mix edit) – 3:56
- Australia CD maxi Festival Mushroom MUSH01900.2
- Europe CD maxi BMG 74321 65764 2
1. "You Look So Fine" – 3:50
2. "Get Busy with the Fizzy" – 2:55
3. "You Look So Fine" (Fun Lovin' Criminals version) – 3:36
4. "You Look So Fine" (Eric Kupper's Deep Drama mix edit) – 3:56

== Music video ==
Shirley Manson looks over Kelly Slater in the "You Look So Fine" video; while in the background, Duke Erikson lurks in silhouette.

The music video for "You Look So Fine" was directed by Stéphane Sednaoui for Propaganda Films. It was filmed on February 26, 1999 on a Los Angeles soundstage. ASP World Champion surfer champion Kelly Slater was cast as the man washed up on the shore that Manson "rescues", and much press was made from his cameo role in the video. While the male members of Garbage were filmed for the video, during offline editing, most of their shots were left unused after the director and the band felt their shots looked "naff". Originally, actor Brad Pitt was cast as the role of the rescued man, but dropped out the night before filming.

With a concept for the video to visually look like a "mixture of a piece by Ingmar Bergman and a Samurai warrior movie", the director created a rock pool and white sand dune landscape dominated by a large pair of eyes in the background sky. Throughout the video, an effect similar to bioluminescent insects flying at night is also employed. The establishing shot is of the landscape, which fades to reveal Manson tending to an unconscious man who has washed up on the shore. While she tends to him, the male members of Garbage are seen lurking in silhouette in the background, while she sees her own reflection acting independently of her at the man's other side. After a while, the man regains consciousness as the sky changes to pink and the image onscreen changes to soft focus, before fading out as Manson sings the final lyrics.

The "You Look So Fine" video was first commercially released on All About Garbage, a covermounted CD-ROM issued by Italian magazine Tribe in 1999. A remastered version of the music video was included on Garbage's 2007 greatest hits DVD Absolute Garbage and uploaded to the band's VEVO channel in 2015

== Remixes and alternate versions ==
| Track title | Length | Remixer/Producer | Commercial release |
|---|---|---|---|
| "You Look So Fine" (radio edit) | 3:50 | Garbage | Yes |
| "You Look So Fine" (Deep Drama mix (Radio edit)) | 3:58 | Eric Kupper | Yes |
| "You Look So Fine" (Deep Drama Club mix) | 8:39 | Eric Kupper | Yes |
| "You Look So Fine" (Deep Drama dub) | 7:57 | Eric Kupper | No |
| "You Look So Fine" (Fun Lovin' Criminals version) | 3:36 | Fun Lovin' Criminals | Yes |

In 2002, British electronica group West London Deep sampled Manson's vocal from "You Look So Fine" on their white label record "You're Taking Me Over". Manson later refused clearance for the sample and the song's commercial release was canceled and withdrawn after remixes by Inner City, Problem Kids and Desyn Masiello & Leon Roberts had been circulated promotionally. West London Deep reworked the track without Manson's vocal and retitled it "Gonna Make You My Lover".

In 2007, Fun Lovin' Criminals' remix was remastered and included on the Absolute Garbage bonus disc Garbage Mixes.

== Charts ==
| Chart (1999) | Peak position |
|---|---|
| Australia (ARIA) | 101 |
| Europe Top 50 Airplay (Music & Media) | 37 |
| Iceland (Íslenski Listinn Topp 40) | 13 |
| Ireland Airplay (IRMA) | 31 |
| Spain Singles (AFYVE) | 15 |
| Spain Top 40 Airplay (AFYVE) | 26 |
| Scotland (Official Charts Company) | 16 |
| UK Singles (CIN) | 19 |
| UK Indie Singles (CIN) | 3 |
