= Push It (Garbage song) =

1998 song by Garbage

Single by Garbage

from the album Version 2.0
- B-side: "Lick the Pavement"; "Thirteen"
- Released: April 20, 1998
- Recorded: March 1997 – February 1998
- Studio: Smart (Madison, Wisconsin)
- Genre: Alternative rock; industrial rock; power pop
- Length: 4:01
- Label: Mushroom
- Songwriter: Garbage
- Producer: Garbage

Garbage singles chronology
"#1 Crush" (1997)	"Push It" (1998)	"I Think I'm Paranoid" (1998)

Music video
- "Push It" on YouTube

"Push It" is a song by American rock band Garbage from their second studio album, Version 2.0 (1998). It was released on April 20, 1998, as the album's lead single. Lead singer Shirley Manson elaborated on the song's dreamy verse structure versus the confrontational chorus: "[It's about] the schizophrenia that exists when you try to reconcile your desires and demons with the need to fit in. It's a song of reassurance". The track contains a musical quotation of the Beach Boys' 1964 song "Don't Worry Baby".

The music video for "Push It" received thirteen nominations between the MTV Video Music Awards, MTV Europe Music Awards, and the MVPA Music Video Awards. "Push It" was also nominated as Best Alternative Records at Miami's Winter Music Conference. In 2007, "Push It" was remixed for Garbage's greatest hits album Absolute Garbage; some elements were made more noticeable, while some elements were reduced or edited out. A rock version was also serviced to UK radio stations to promote the compilation.

== Writing and production ==
Garbage began writing for their second album at the start of March 1997 at a vacation house in Friday Harbor, Washington. There, the group demoed and made rough outlines for new songs over a three-week period. When they felt that they had made a good start, they relocated to their Madison, Wisconsin, base at Smart Studios and began fleshing out the ideas and rough sketches that were made over the rest of the year. The group recorded all of the material for the second album through a 48-track digital system direct to hard drives utilizing a 24-bit Pro Tools rig. Vocalist Shirley Manson wrote the majority of her lyrics while ensconced in a hotel near the studio. Garbage completed recording, producing and mixing of their second album in mid-February 1998, and the album was given the title Version 2.0.

During a vocal tracking session in which Manson was singing over music already written for "Push It", the band felt that one of the lines in "Push It" would benefit from having a vocal chorus answering the words back to her. Inspired by Manson's spontaneous ad-lib of the phrase "don't worry baby" over the music, guitarist Steve Marker sampled the Beach Boys song "Don't Worry Baby" and used it as a backing vocal. The sample didn't work with what the band had already recorded so Manson re-sang the lines to fit the key and tempo of the song. Aware of the potential for incurring copyright legalities, the band debated whether or not to keep the line. Garbage and Brian Wilson coincidentally shared the same publishing company (Irving Music), and figuring that they had nothing to lose, contacted him through their company representative, sent him a copy of "Push It", and asked him for permission to use the interpolation. Wilson gave his blessing, and reportedly kept the tape. Both Wilson and Roger Christian, the deceased co-writer of "Don't Worry Baby", received a writing credit. A simpler interpolation credit was given to Herbie Azor, as the band's lawyers felt that there was a possible similarity of the line "Push it!" to his own "Push It", which had been a hit single for New York hip hop trio Salt-N-Pepa.

At the end of the middle 8, Garbage had originally recorded a drum fill to lead back into the final chorus, but decided to develop a suspenseful bridge back into the final part. The band used a number of pitch-shifting and time-stretching plugins and matched them with an orchestral swell in an ascending chromatic scale sampled from a classical music album. The new part had been influenced by The Beatles "A Day in the Life", and the group decided to keep it when Manson encouraged them to.

== Release ==
The Version 2.0 album campaign officially began on March 16, 1998, when "Push It" debuted on European radio. In the United Kingdom, the song was A-listed at Radio One, Virgin, XFM, GLR and playlisted at a further sixty-two regional radio stations; with such support "Push It" subsequently reached number 20 on the airplay chart. Mushroom Records issued "Push It" commercially on April 27 on CD and cassette single; both contained a brand new Garbage track, "Lick the Pavement", on the B-side, while the CD format also included a remix by Japanese band Boom Boom Satellites. A collectable 3-inch CD Blisterpack was also issued, backed with a cover version of Big Star's "Thirteen".

Mushroom's European distributor, BMG, released "Push It" across the continent on April 20, 1998, in two CD formats; a four-track maxi single collecting together both b-sides and the Boom Boom Satellites remix, and a two-track card sleeved single backed with "Lick the Pavement". In Australia and New Zealand, "Push It" was released by White Label Records on April 20, 1998, on two CDs, in the same combination as Europe had received.

In North America, Almo Sounds serviced "Push It" to alternative radio on March 30, 1998. Several radio stations jumped the add date for "Push It", even though Almo served cease and desist orders. Almo's campaign for "Push It" centered around breaking the single at alternative radio, as the format had strongly supported the band before. The label weren't too concerned whether or not "Push It" would crossover into Top 40 radio as they had confidence in the album's follow-up singles.

In late 1999, the song was featured in the intro video of EA Sports' PlayStation/PC ice hockey video game NHL 2000. In 2007, Chris Sheldon remixed a rock version of "Push It" which was playlisted by XFM prior to the release of Absolute Garbage.

=== 3-inch CD blister pack ===
The sealed "Push It" 3-inch CD blister pack format

Garbage had been established on their first album as an act who regularly released special editions of their singles; their first six singles had each seen a specially packed 7-inch vinyl format released in embossed aluminium, rubber, hologram die-cut rain-effect card, perspex, cloth and with a lenticular image mounted on ripple-effect card respectively. The band and their UK label were keen to continue using special packaging for the singles from Version 2.0; however, new rules issued the previous year from UK chart compiler Chart Information Network (CIN) had forbidden the chart inclusion of sales of any singles packaged elaborately. Mushroom kept in mind that they had lost money on the pressing of every single 7-inch they released; Garbage were also aware of the potential trap of repeating themselves on their second album.

In 1996, while the band had been on tour in Japan, they had seen 3" CD singles on sale in record stores. "They were packaged in these beautiful little boxes", Manson recalled later, "It was all very minimalist and absolutely beautiful, and we wanted to do something that was very beautiful and minimalist". When Mushroom made inquiries during the design stage, they discovered that record stores refused to rack them because they were not used to stocking singles in Snap-Pack boxes. The art designer for the project, Ade Britteon, suggested packaging the discs in pre-formed plastic sealed onto a 5-inch card blister, similar to how electrical batteries are displayed, so that the disc could be popped through the back of the packaging.

Garbage eventually released five singles in this manner; starting with "Push It" and ending a year later with "You Look So Fine". Despite the collectable nature of the format, the fact that at the time very few European artists pressed 3-inch CDs and that the vacuum-packaging cost more to produce than a standard CD single meant that Mushroom did not repeat the format for their other artists.

== Reception ==
Upon its release, "Push It" received a positive response from music critics and journalists. Craig Maclean of The Face wrote, ""Push It" is vintage Garbage: sultry, unharried vocals from Shirley, a galloping mix of buzzsawing guitars, a mash of samples, rumbling rhythms, an elegant discordancy... it is the album-closing song The Prodigy's cover of L7's "Fuel My Fire" should have been: barely-controlled pop-mayhem".

At the end of its first week on sale "Push It" debuted at number nine on the UK Singles Chart becoming the band's third top-10 single. "Push It" remained in the UK top 75 for five weeks. In France, "Push It" charted for a single week at number 99. In the Netherlands it debuted at number 98 and peaked the following week at number 77, while in Germany, the single peaked at number 88. Some of the higher European chart positions came from Iceland, where "Push It" reached number 2 after five weeks, Ireland where it reached number 26, Finland where it peaked at number 14, and in Spain, where the single was released by RCA Records, "Push It" debuted at number five. The single spent a second week at that peak, before dropping out of the Spanish top 10 in early June. The song also peaked at number 20 on the Spanish airplay chart. Across Europe, "Push It" reached number 38 on the European Hot 100 Singles chart and number six on the European Radio Top 50 chart.

At the end of the month, "Push It" debuted on the ARIA Singles Chart at number 31 where it stayed for a second week before dropping out of the chart on its seventh week. At the same time, "Push It" debuted on the RIANZ Singles Chart at number 16, and climbed seven days later to peak at number 15. It ultimately spent six weeks on the charts. White Label also licensed out commercial singles of "Push It" internationally for release in South Africa and Venezuela.

In its first week, "Push It" became the #1 Most Added record on the alternative format and debuted in mid-April as the highest new entry on Modern Rock at number 25. The same week "Push It" debuted at number 72 on the Hot 100 Airplay chart. The following chart saw "Push It" rocket into the Modern Rock top 10 at number eight with an "Airpower" status (meaning the song had registered over 900 detections for the first time). Almo released a limited edition pressing of "Push It" on CD to record stores in both the States and Canada on April 21. At the end of that week, the physical release debuted at number 63 on the Hot 100 Singles Sales chart and at number 52 on the Billboard Hot 100. The song also reached an airplay peak of number 56 as it rose to number five on the Modern Rock Tracks chart. At alternative, "Push It" remained at that position for the rest of May.

"Push It" remained in the Modern Rock top 10 and hovering around the mid-50s on the Hot 100 until the second week of July. By this time, second single "I Think I'm Paranoid" had debuted on the Modern Rock chart. Almo serviced remixes of "Push It" by New York City producer Victor Calderone to DJs; the song debuted on the Hot Dance Music/Club Play chart in mid-July at number 44. "Push It" rose to number five by the end of August. Capitalizing on the song's gain in popularity in nightclubs, the label commercially issued a double A-side 12-inch vinyl of Calderone remixes of "Push It" backed with mixes of "I Think I'm Paranoid" by The Crystal Method, on October 20. In total, "Push It" spent 18 weeks on the Hot 100 (exiting in early September), 21 weeks on the Modern Rock charts (leaving a week earlier) and 13 weeks on the dance chart (in early October).

== Music video ==
In a surreal moment of the "Push It" video, Shirley Manson leads her partner to his assassination in a Los Angeles deli.

The music video for "Push It" was directed by Italian photographer Andrea Giacobbe for Satellite Films/Propaganda Films. The $750,000 video was shot over four days in Los Angeles in early March 1998.

Garbage were impressed enough by Giacobbe's show reel, in particular his previous video for Death in Vegas ("Dirt") to assign the fledgling director the project. The band thought his storyboard treatment was bizarre. "He chops up film and he talks about this kind of timelessness, which is kind of the same thing that we're doing musically. He doesn't want to set the video in any place or time. You will not know what era and what time this video is set in," Manson later explained. Giacobbe used many different film stocks to create the different styles present in the video; at various points in the narrative, the video changes from sepia tone, black and white or false-color and back.

Garbage were not particularly satisfied with the first rough cut of the video, assembled before any post-production had taken place. Vig considered that the first version "came out very flat and with not particularly flattering lighting, because almost every frame he tweaks out in the computer, so there's a lot of post-production stuff to give it that old Twilight Zone look, or Technicolor, 1970s Starsky and Hutch look. [Giacobbe] kept saying 'Don't worry, this is just the canvas I'm going to paint on.'" Vig added that the video later had single frame details "which makes it easier to watch on repeated viewings." The band later described the video as "Fellini-esque". The first day of shooting included filming on location at a supermarket, the second day in a hospital and the third in a cemetery. One of the props on the first day, a stuffed deer mounted on wheels, broke loose and caused a minor car accident. At the hospital, Giacobbe injured himself in a fall while filming.

The "Push It" video won the Best Make-Up MVPA Award for the prosthetic work done on the conjoined twin aliens.

The "Push It" storyline begins (although the video may be an example of nonlinear narrative) with Manson shopping alongside a partner, a rotoscoped "fuzzy" man, in a supermarket. As Garbage look on, the "fuzzy" man is stalked and attacked by three antagonists disguised as nuns. After the chorus, three triplet schoolboys are seen carrying a MacGuffin briefcase and tracking Manson on a hand-held video monitor. The triplets arrive at Manson's house and give her the briefcase before attacking her new partner, a René Magritte-esque man with a lightbulb in place of his head. During the middle eighth, Manson is shown with childlike versions of "Fuzzy" and "Lightbulb man". She then leaves them behind to walk through a graveyard towards a hooded man bringing her an oversized balloon. Throughout the duration of the video, footage of various non-related characters is shown: a masked female and a stuffed deer, two humanoid aliens conjoined by a glowing head-growth, two toddlers riding adults piggyback as the adults wildly thrash, two Asian businessmen fighting, a Navy Officer contortionist who alludes to a foot fetish, a naked woman emerging from glowing hospital bath and a little girl surrounded by four members of SWAT raising a toast just before an explosion behind the camera. The hooded character is later revealed to be Manson herself, unmasking in view of a mirror before licking her own reflection. She is last seen leaving with the briefcase and the now-adult Fuzzy and Light bulb headed man in a Fiat 500.

The "Push It" video was nominated for eight MTV Video Music Awards. The general awards categories were Best Group Video and Best Alternative Video, while the professional categories were Breakthrough Video and Best Direction (both nominations for Andrea Giacobbe), Best Editing (for Sylvain Connat), Best Art Direction (Virginia Lee), Best Cinematography (Max Malkin) and Best Special Effects (Sébastien Caudron). It was also up for one MTV Europe Music Award for Best Video. A year later, Garbage were the leading nominee for the MVPA Music Video Awards industry event, with six nominations shared between the videos for "Push It" and "Special". Gina Monaci and Jeff Judd won the award for Best Make-Up in a Music Video for their work on "Push It". "Push It" was also nominated for Best Styling (nomination to Jennifer Elster), Best Hair (Gina Monaci and Kevin Ryan) and Best Alternative Video (to Satellite Films).

On April 6, 1998, the "Push It" video premiered in the United States, where it was a MTV exclusive for the duration of the month. The video subsequently aired worldwide from May. The video was first made commercially available on Garbage's 2007 greatest hits DVD compilation Absolute Garbage, albeit with digital alterations obscuring the moments of partial nudity.

== Track listings ==
- UK CD single Mushroom MUSH28CDS
1. "Push it" – 4:01
2. "Lick the Pavement" – 2:43
3. "Push it – Boom Boom Satellites mix" – 6:43
- UK 3-inch CD single Mushroom MUSH28CDSX
1. "Push it" – 4:01
2. "Thirteen" – 3:31
- UK cassette single Mushroom MUSH28MCS
1. "Push it" – 4:01
2. "Lick the Pavement" – 2:43
- Australia CD maxi White MUSH01747.2
- Europe CD maxi BMG 74321 55409 2
- South Africa CD maxi BMG CDMUSH(WS)903
1. "Push it" – 4:01
2. "Push it – Boom Boom Satellites mix" – 6:43
3. "Lick the Pavement" – 2:43
4. "Thirteen" – 3:31
- Australia CD single White MUSH01747.5
- Europe CD single BMG 74321 55411 2
1. "Push it" – 4:01
2. "Lick the Pavement" – 2:43
- Canada CD maxi Almo Sounds AMDS-9872
- US CD maxi Almo Sounds AMSDS-89014
1. "Push it" – 4:01
2. "Thirteen" – 3:31
3. "Push it – Boom Boom Satellites mix" – 6:43
- US 12-inch single Almo Sounds AMS12-88005
1. "Push it – Club mix" – 7:19
2. "Push it – Dub mix" – 3:40
3. "I Think I'm Crystalized Extended" – 7:25
4. "I Think I'm Crystalized Dub" – 5:18

== Charts ==
=== Weekly charts ===
Chart (1998)	Peak position
Australia (ARIA)	31
Belgium (Ultratip Bubbling Under Flanders)	17
Canada Rock/Alternative (RPM)	3
Europe (European Hot 100 Singles)	38
Finland (Suomen virallinen lista)	14
France (SNEP)	99
Germany (GfK)	88
Iceland (Íslenski Listinn Topp 40)	2
Ireland (IRMA)	26
Netherlands (Dutch Top 40 Tipparade)	14
Netherlands (Single Top 100)	77
New Zealand (Recorded Music NZ)	15
Scottish Singles Sales (Official Charts)	9
Spain (AFYVE)	5
UK Singles (Official Charts)	9
UK Indie (Official Charts)	2
US Billboard Hot 100	52
US Alternative Airplay (Billboard)	5
US Dance Club Songs (Billboard)	5

=== Year-end charts ===
Chart (1998)	Position
Canada Rock/Alternative (RPM)	31
US Alternative Airplay (Billboard)	21

== Release history ==
Region	Date	Format	Label
Australia	April 20, 1998	CD single; CD maxi single	White Label
New Zealand	April 20, 1998	CD maxi single; cassette single	White Label
Europe	April 20, 1998	CD single; CD maxi single	BMG
South Africa	April 20, 1998	CD maxi single	BMG
Canada	April 21, 1998	CD maxi single	Almo Sounds
United States	April 21, 1998	CD maxi single	Almo Sounds
United Kingdom	April 27, 1998	CD single; 3-inch CD single; cassette single	Mushroom
United Kingdom	September 28, 1998	12-inch White Label Music (Victor Calderone mixes)	Mushroom
United States	October 20, 1998	12-inch single (as "Push It"/"I Think I'm Paranoid")	Almo Sounds
