= I Think I'm Paranoid =

1998 single by Garbage

Single by Garbage

from the album Version 2.0
- B-side: "Deadwood"; "Afterglow"
- Released: July 6, 1998
- Recorded: March 1997–February 1998
- Studio: Smart (Madison, Wisconsin)
- Genre: Pop rock
- Length: 3:37
- Label: Mushroom UK; Almo Sounds (North America)
- Songwriter: Garbage
- Producer: Garbage

Garbage singles chronology
"Push It" (1998)	"I Think I'm Paranoid" (1998)	"Special" (1998)

"I Think I'm Paranoid" is a song written, performed and produced by rock band Garbage and was the second single released from their second album Version 2.0.

The song was released internationally in July 1998, following up on the success of the band's prior hit, "Push It". "I Think I'm Paranoid" reached the Top Ten on the UK singles chart and Airplay charts, while across the Atlantic also becoming a hit on Billboard's Modern Rock Tracks chart. "I Think I'm Paranoid" became the biggest hit from Version 2.0 in Italy, where it featured on a 30-second advert campaign for Breil Watches and was placed in rotation by MTV Italy.

In 2007, "I Think I'm Paranoid" was remastered and included on Garbage's greatest hits album Absolute Garbage.

== Composition and recording ==
Garbage began writing their second album, which would go under the working title of Sad Alcoholic Clowns, in March 1997 in the band's label-head Jerry Moss's Friday Harbor, Washington, vacation house. The group demoed and made rough outlines for new songs, of which "Bend Me", the working title of I Think I'm Paranoid, was one. When they felt they had made a good start, Garbage took the work they made in Washington back to their Madison, Wisconsin base at Smart Studios and begin fleshing out the ideas and rough sketches over the following year.

Garbage intended their second album to build upon the framework, music style and musical template laid down by their first release; to create a rapprochement between the "high-tech and low-down, the now sound and of golden memories" and wear musical references to the 1960s, 1970s and 1980s. Garbage recorded all of their work for the second album through a 48-track digital system digitally, direct to hard drives using a 24bit Pro Tools rig: the production of "Bend Me" would feature almost 120 audio tracks.

Duke Erikson created the opening guitar riff and arranged the backing chords, over which Shirley Manson sang. Manson's vocal was manipulated in various parts of the song by running the feed to the mixing console through a filter or a stomp box to provide distortion and by using Pro Tools plug-ins to time-stretch the vocal take. Much of the percussion was recorded in a disused candy factory located in Madison; Butch Vig, Steve Marker and sound engineer Billy Bush set up a drum kit within the empty building and recorded various fills, using the favourable acoustics therein. Forced to stop after local police officers responded to complaints about the noise, some of the percussion was later incorporated into the chorus of "Bend Me" (and also found its way into "Temptation Waits" and "Hammering in My Head"). The intro section made use of many percussive loops of kick, snare and hi-hat sounds. Some loops were flipped backwards, filtered and ran through an amp to create some white noise effects. Garbage employed touring bassist Daniel Shulman to perform electric bass on the song, while Vig approached a DJ he met in Los Angeles, Todd Malcolm Michelles, to provide a record scratching effect under the chorus.

Garbage completed recording, producing and mixing of their second album in mid-February 1998, and the album was given the title Version 2.0. "Bend Me", which had by now had its official title finalized as "I Think I'm Paranoid", was track listed as the album's second song. Version 2.0 was released worldwide on May 11 of that year; despite a slow start, Version 2.0 went on to equal its predecessor, selling over four million copies and achieving platinum-certification in many territories, including United States, Canada, United Kingdom, Europe and Australia.

== Song history ==
Garbage debuted "I Think I'm Paranoid" live on May 15, 1998, at a concert at Ryan's Ballroom in Combined Locks, Wisconsin; the first date of the Version 2.0 World Tour. Garbage took to Europe from June 1 to join the festival circuit, as well as perform a number of their own headline shows, helping support the single release for "I Think I'm Paranoid". The single was preempted by a televised performance of both "..Paranoid" and "Push It" on French show Nulle Part Ailleurs, and on British entertainment show TFI Friday.

Like its preceding single, "I Think I'm Paranoid" was A-listed at Radio One and XFM, reaching number 14 in the UK Airplay chart. On July 6, 1998, Mushroom Records issued "I Think I'm Paranoid" in the United Kingdom in a two-part CD single set and cassette single formats, backed with b-sides "Deadwood" and "Afterglow" and remixes of "...Paranoid" by Purity and The Crystal Method spread across the two CDs. The song debuted at number 9 on the UK Singles Chart the following Sunday, becoming Garbage's fourth UK top ten hit in a row. On the same day (July 12), Garbage completed their European tour with a "homecoming" slot at Scotland's T In The Park festival. On July 13, Mushroom then released the single as a collectible 3-inch CD in a blister pack as a limited edition of 3,000. This special format collected together all the tracks onto one single disc; however the release was only on sale for one week and its sales were chart ineligible. Garbage appeared on British chart show Top of the Pops to mark its high chart placing.

Across Europe, Mushroom Records then-distributor BMG released "I Think I'm Paranoid" on CD maxi and CD single formats in various territories from July 6. In Germany, "...Paranoid" placed a single week at number 98 on August 3, in the Netherlands, the song spent the single week of August 8 at number 94 following heavy rotation from Kink FM and TMF, while in France, the song debuted at number 100 on September 19, peaking in its second week of three at number 80 (it also reached number 21 on the French airplay charts). In Finland, "...Paranoid" spent eighteen weeks on the airplay charts, and reached the Top 20 on their sales chart; in Austria, the single was heavily supported by FM4 radio, and licensed to a Megacard sampler CD as a youth incentive from Bank Austria; in Brussels, "...Paranoid" was heavily supported by stations Studio Brussel (where it was voted listener's number-one choice) and Radio 21; in Spain, "I Think I'm Paranoid" topped their airplay chart for a single week in September 1998. In Italy, "I Think I'm Paranoid" featured on a 30-second advert campaign for Breil and received heavy rotation from MTV Italy, shifting 9,000 sales of the single there. Other major supporters of "I Think I'm Paranoid" were Norway's NRJ, Poland's Radio 3 and Atomic TV, Portugal's Antena 3, Sweden's ZTV, Switzerland's DRS 3 and One FM ("...Paranoid" was the number 2 newcomer on Swiss radio the week of airplay impact) who all playlisted the track. "I Think I'm Paranoid" reached number 25 on the European Top 50 Airplay chart and number 35 on the European Top 100 sales chart.

In Argentina, BMG released "I Think I'm Paranoid" as a commercial single, where it had reached number 4 on their airplay charts. Argentina was the only Latin American country to see a commercial release. In Chile, "..Paranoid" reached number 4 and spent five weeks in the airplay top ten; while in Venezuela the single spent thirteen weeks on their airplay charts. In Mexico, "...Paranoid" reached the airplay top five. Over in South Africa, "..Paranoid" was the number-one track on two radio stations, including 5FM. White Records released "I Think I'm Paranoid" in Australia and New Zealand on July 27 as a two-CD set. In Australia, the song peaked at number 57, spending five weeks in the top 100 ARIA singles chart, however in New Zealand, the song debuted at number 29, before peaking on its second of five weeks at number 19. Australia's Channel V and Triple-J radio heavily supported "...Paranoid".

In North America, Almo Sounds opted to give "I Think I'm Paranoid" an airplay-only release, where it debuted on the Billboard Modern Rock chart at number 30 on July 18, and peaking for five weeks at number 6 across September of that year, eventually registering twenty six weeks on the chart. On August 15, the same week that "I Think I'm Paranoid" broke into the Modern Rock Top 10, the song made its debut appearance on the Hot 100 Airplay chart, peaking at number 70 on the fourth of six consecutive weeks on that chart. Remixes of the song by The Crystal Method (in which the song was retitled "I Think I'm Crystalized") would later be given a physical distribution on 12" vinyl on a double A-side release with remixes of "Push It" by Victor Calderone. The song's North American chart run was concurrent with the band's headline tour of the United States and Canada, which ran from September to December.

== After release ==
An acoustic recording of "I Think I'm Paranoid" recorded by the band for Seattle rock compilation The End Sessions, Vol 2 was released in November 1999. "I Think I'm Paranoid" was licensed for inclusion on the 1999 PlayStation videogame Gran Turismo 2, and eight years later, on the 2007 video game Rock Band as a playable track.

In May 2001, New York-based music publisher Helios Music Corporation filed a copyright infringement suit against Garbage, the band's own publisher Rondor Music, its North American record label Almo Sounds, and seven other co-defendants in the United States District Court for the Central District of California, alleging that "I Think I'm Paranoid" copied "significant elements of both lyrics and music" from the 1967 Scott English and Larry Weiss composition "Bend Me, Shape Me" (a hit in the U.S. for The American Breed and in the U.K. for Amen Corner), and that by failing to give "credit to the writers and publisher of ["Bend Me, Shape Me"], the defendants had falsely represented to the public that [Garbage] had independently created and are the authors of ["I Think I'm Paranoid"], in its entirety." Helios contendend that the chorus to "Bend Me, Shape Me" ("Bend me, shape me/Anyway you want me") was similar to that of the Garbage lyric ("Bend me, break me/Anyway you need me"); Helios sought credit for "I Think I'm Paranoid", as well as damages, including all profits generated by the song and for the defendants to cease "any further sale, distribution or exploitation" of the song". Garbage considered the legal action a "nuisance suit".

== Music video ==
Shirley Manson (left) and her mouth in the "I Think I'm Paranoid" video.

Directed by Matthew Rolston in Los Angeles' Occidental Studios, the video clip for "I Think I'm Paranoid" premiered in the United States on July 12 and was modified shortly after release to soften some of the strobing within the video.

The concept behind the video was simplicity, contrasting with the band's previous effects-heavy video for "Push It"; it was shot in black and white in order to appear "almost photographic". Rolston used mylar to create effects on-screen, and shot the band in close up, inspired by the cover of The Beatles' album With the Beatles.

The "I Think I'm Paranoid" video was first made commercially available in 1999 on the Italian CD-ROM sampler All About Garbage. A remastered version of the video was included on Garbage's 2007 greatest hits DVD Absolute Garbage, and made available as a digital download via online music services the same year.

== Track listings ==
- UK cassette Mushroom MUSH35MCS
- European CD single BMG 74321 57438 2
1. "I Think I'm Paranoid" – 3:37
2. "Deadwood" – 4:22
- Australia CD1 White MUSH01785.2
- UK CD1 Mushroom MUSH39CDS
1. "I Think I'm Paranoid" – 3:37
2. "Deadwood" – 4:22
3. "Afterglow" – 2:32
- Australia CD2 White MUSH01785.5
- UK CD2 Mushroom MUSH39CDSX
1. "I Think I'm Paranoid" – 3:37
2. "I Think I'm Crystalized (Extended edit)" – 7:39
3. "I Think I'm Paranoid (Purity mix) – Jill Stark" – 5:32
- European CD maxi BMG 74321 57837 2
1. "I Think I'm Paranoid" – 3:37
2. "Deadwood" – 4:22
3. "Afterglow" – 2:32
4. "I Think I'm Crystalized (Extended edit)" – 7:39
- UK 3" CD Mushroom MUSH35CDSXXX
1. "I Think I'm Paranoid" – 3:37
2. "Deadwood" – 4:22
3. "Afterglow" – 2:32
4. "I Think I'm Crystalized (Radio edit)" – 4:30
5. "I Think I'm Paranoid (Purity mix) – Jill Stark" – 5:32

== Remixes ==
Track title	Length	Remixer/Producer	Commercial release
"I Think I'm Crystalized (Extended edit)"	7:25	The Crystal Method	Yes
"I Think I'm Crystalized (Radio edit)"	4:35	The Crystal Method	No
"I Think I'm Crystalized (Dub)"	5:18	The Crystal Method	No
"I Think I'm Paranoid (Purity mix)"	5:32	Jill Stark	Yes

In 2007, Crystal Method's mix was remastered and included on the Absolute Garbage bonus disc Garbage Mixes.

== Charts ==
Chart performance for "I Think I'm Paranoid"
Chart (1998)	Peak position
Australia (ARIA)	57
Belgium (Ultratip Bubbling Under Flanders)	17
European Hot 100 (Billboard)	35
European Hot 100 Airplay (Billboard)	25
France (SNEP)	80
Germany (GfK)	98
Iceland (Íslenski Listinn Topp 40)	5
Netherlands (Single Top 100)	94
New Zealand (Recorded Music NZ)	19
Spain Airplay (AFYVE)	1
Scottish Singles Sales (Official Charts)	7
UK Singles (Official Charts)	9
UK Indie (Official Charts)	2
US Radio Songs (Billboard)	70
US Alternative Airplay (Billboard)	6

== Release history ==
Release history and formats for "I Think I'm Paranoid"
Territory	Release date	Record label	Format
Europe	July 6, 1998	BMG	CD maxi, CD single
United Kingdom	July 6, 1998	Mushroom Records UK	2×CD single set, cassette single
United Kingdom	July 13, 1998	Mushroom Records UK	3" CD
United States	July 13, 1998	Almo Sounds	Airplay: Modern Rock
Australia	July 27, 1998	White Records	2×CD single set
