= Garbage tour =

1995–96 concert tour by Garbage

- World tour by Garbage
- Garbage performing onstage at the Bizarre Festival in Cologne, Germany on August 17, 1996
- Location: North America; Europe; Asia; Australasia
- Associated album: Garbage
- Start date: November 5, 1995
- End date: December 18, 1996
- No. of shows: 88 headline shows; 50 support shows; 21 rock festivals; 15 radio festivals; 174 total
- Supporting acts: Acetone; The Elevator Drops; Bis; The Rentals; Placebo; Polara; Fun Lovin' Criminals; Pollyana; Ash

Garbage concert chronology
- Garbage tour (1995–1996); Version 2.0 World Tour (1998–1999)

The Garbage tour was the debut concert tour by American rock band Garbage, in support of their self-titled debut album (1995). It began on November 5, 1995, in Minneapolis, Minnesota, and ended on December 18, 1996, in Inglewood, California. For the duration of the tour, Garbage's touring line-up was augmented by Daniel Shulman, who had previously been a session musician for Run-D.M.C., on bass guitar. Samplers and MIDI controllers helped the band members perform the varied sounds that augmented the studio versions of the songs. Despite all the members of the group having accumulated years of touring experience prior to forming, Garbage initially had no plans to tour in support of their debut album; they changed their minds after finding that they enjoyed themselves while filming the music video for their debut single, "Vow". Director Samuel Bayer had encouraged the group to play the song live as he filmed them, rather than playing along to a backing track.

The Garbage tour started off with low-key headlining shows in late 1995, during which time the band visited a number of media cities in North America and Europe. The band spent the following year on tour, performing as the main act, spending two separate runs as an opening act for the Smashing Pumpkins on their Infinite Sadness arena tour, performing on TV and radio shows and performing on the bill at rock and radio festivals around the world. A number of notable acts supported Garbage throughout the run of the tour, including Acetone, Ash, Bis, The Elevator Drops, Fun Lovin' Criminals, The Rentals, Placebo, Polyanna and Polara. The tour was booked by Kevin Gasser of Creative Artists Agency. Before the 1996 concerts, the band reworked the songs to make them work better live, and also adopted more MIDI guitars to use less keyboards on stage.

Video camera footage shot by Garbage during the early 1996 tour dates was incorporated into both that year's opening titles of the band's first long-form VHS and VCD compilation, Garbage Video, and the band's hour-long retrospective documentary, Thanks For Your Uhhh, Support, which featured on the group's 2007 greatest hits DVD Absolute Garbage.

== Tour dates ==
Date	City	Country	Venue
North American club tour Support act: Acetone
November 5, 1995	Minneapolis	United States	7th Street Entry
November 6, 1995	Milwaukee	United States	Shank Hall
November 7, 1995	Chicago	United States	Cabaret Metro
November 9, 1995	Detroit	United States	St. Andrews Hall
November 10, 1995	Toronto	Canada	Opera House
November 11, 1995	Montreal	Canada	Cafe Campus
November 13, 1995	New York City	United States	Irving Plaza
November 14, 1995	Boston	United States	Axis
November 15, 1995	Philadelphia	United States	Theater of Living Arts
November 16, 1995	Washington, D.C.	United States	Black Cat
November 17, 1995	Cleveland	United States	Peabody's Down Under
November 19, 1995	Nashville	United States	Exit/In
November 20, 1995	Atlanta	United States	The Point
European club tour
November 23, 1995	London	United Kingdom	Kentish Town Forum
November 25, 1995	Amsterdam	Netherlands	Melkweg
November 27, 1995	Hamburg	Germany	Grosse Freiheit
November 28, 1995	Copenhagen	Denmark	Pumphuset
November 30, 1995	Brussels	Belgium	VK Club
December 1, 1995	Rennes	France	Transmusicales Festival
December 3, 1995	Munich	Germany	Wappensaal
North American club & radio shows
December 5, 1995	Cambridge	United States	WBCN Xmas Rave, Middle East
December 6, 1995	New Britain	United States	Radio 104's Jingle Bell Jam, The Sting
December 7, 1995	Fairfax	United States	HFSMas Nutcracker, Patriot Center
December 9, 1995	Minneapolis	United States	KEGE Holiday Festival, Target Center
December 11, 1995	Portland	United States	KNRK Snow Ball, Memorial Coliseum
December 12, 1995	Seattle	United States	Moe's Mo' Rockin' Cafe
December 14, 1995	San Francisco	United States	Slim's
December 15, 1995	Berkeley	United States	Live 105 Green Christmas, Berkeley Community Theatre
December 16, 1995	San Jose	United States	KOME Almost Acoustic Christmas, SJSU Event Center
December 17, 1995	Universal City	United States	KROQ Almost Acoustic Christmas; Universal Amphitheater
December 19, 1995	Los Angeles	United States	Viper Room
December 20, 1995	Los Angeles	United States	The Roxy
North American clubs Support act: The Elevator Drops
February 24, 1996	Dallas	United States	Deep Ellum Live
February 26, 1996	Austin	United States	Liberty Lunch
February 27, 1996	Houston	United States	Numbers
February 28, 1996	New Orleans	United States	Howling Wolf
March 1, 1996	St. Petersburg	United States	State Theater
March 2, 1996	Fort Lauderdale	United States	The Edge
March 3, 1996	Orlando	United States	Renaissance
March 4, 1996	Pensacola	United States	Rosie O'Gradys
March 6, 1996	Chapel Hill	United States	Cat's Cradle
March 7, 1996	Norfolk	United States	The Bait Shack
March 8, 1996	Pittsburgh	United States	Metropol
March 9, 1996	Vernon	United States	Z100 SNOasis, Vernon Valley Ski Area
March 11, 1996	Columbus	United States	Newport Music Hall
March 12, 1996	Cincinnati	United States	Bogart's
March 13, 1996	Indianapolis	United States	Vogue Nightclub
March 14, 1996	Madison	United States	Barrymore Theatre
UK & Europe Support Acts: Bis, The Rentals
March 19, 1996	Wolverhampton	United Kingdom	Civic Hall
March 21, 1996	Glasgow	United Kingdom	Barrowland Ballroom
March 22, 1996	Manchester	United Kingdom	The Apollo
March 24, 1996	London	United Kingdom	Brixton Academy
March 25, 1996	Cambridge	United Kingdom	The Corn Exchange
March 26, 1996	Leeds	United Kingdom	Town and Country
March 27, 1996	Nottingham	United Kingdom	Rock City
March 30, 1996	Ghent	Belgium	Vooruit
April 1, 1996	Berlin	Germany	Metropol
April 3, 1996	Paris	France	Élysée Montmartre
April 4, 1996	Frankfurt	Germany	Batshkapp
April 6, 1996	Luxembourg	Luxembourg	Den Atelier
April 7, 1996	Düsseldorf	Germany	Philips Halle
UK Radio Concert Support Act: Placebo
April 9, 1996	Leeds	United Kingdom	BBC Sound City, Leeds Metropolitan University
North America Support Act: Polara
April 16, 1996	Toronto	Canada	Phoenix
April 17, 1996	Montreal	Canada	Spectrum
April 18, 1996	Boston	United States	Avalon
April 19, 1996	New York City	United States	Roseland Ballroom
April 21, 1996	Richmond	United States	Classic Amphitheatre
April 22, 1996	Washington, D.C.	United States	9:30 Club
April 23, 1996	Philadelphia	United States	Theater of Living Arts
April 24, 1996	Toronto	Canada	Opera House
April 25, 1996	Rochester	United States	New York Nites
April 27, 1996	Milwaukee	United States	The Rave
April 28, 1996	Chicago	United States	Cabaret Metro
April 30, 1996	Denver	United States	Ogden Theatre
May 1, 1996	Salt Lake City	United States	Club DV8
May 3, 1996	Seattle	United States	Club DV8
May 4, 1996	Vancouver	Canada	Vogue Theatre
May 5, 1996	Portland	United States	La Luna
May 7, 1996	San Francisco	United States	The Fillmore
May 9, 1996	Pomona	United States	Glass House
May 10, 1996	San Diego	United States	SOMA
May 11, 1996	Hollywood	United States	Hollywood Palace
May 12, 1996	Phoenix	United States	Electric Ballroom
May 13, 1996	Albuquerque	United States	
May 15, 1996	Lawrence	United States	
May 16, 1996	Columbia	United States	
May 17, 1996	Madison	United States	
May 18, 1996	Madison	United States	
North American radio festivals
May 25, 1996	Somerset	United States	93.7 EdgeFest, Float Rite Park Amphitheater
May 26, 1996	Chicago	United States	Q101 Jamboree, New World Music Theatre
May 27, 1996	St. Louis	United States	KPNT Pointfest 5, Riverport Amphitheater
May 29, 1996	Lawrence	United States	Granada Theater
June 1, 1996	Washington, D.C.	United States	HFStival, RFK Stadium
June 11, 1996	Mexico City	Mexico	Teatro Metropolitan
June 14, 1996	Mountain View	United States	Live 105 BFD, Shoreline Amphitheatre
June 15, 1996	Laguna Hills	United States	KROQ Weenie Roast, Irvine Meadows Amphitheatre
June 16, 1996	Santa Barbara	United States	Backstage
North America arenas Supporting The Smashing Pumpkins on the Infinite Sadness tour
June 25, 1996	Saginaw	United States	Wendler Arena
June 27, 1996	Indianapolis	United States	Market Square Arena
June 29, 1996	Auburn Hills	United States	Palace of Auburn Hills
June 30, 1996	Detroit	United States	State Theatre
July 2, 1996	Buffalo	United States	Buffalo Memorial Auditorium
July 3, 1996	Cleveland	United States	Gund Arena
July 5, 1996	Philadelphia	United States	CoreStates Spectrum
July 6, 1996	Philadelphia	United States	CoreStates Spectrum
July 7, 1996	Hampton	United States	Hampton Coliseum
July 9, 1996	Washington, D.C.	United States	USAir Arena
July 10, 1996	Washington, D.C.	United States	USAir Arena
July 12, 1996	New York City	United States	Madison Square Garden (Cancelled)
July 13, 1996	New York City	United States	Madison Square Garden (Cancelled)
July 14, 1996	East Rutherford	United States	Continental Airlines Arena (Cancelled)
July 16, 1996	Pittsburgh	United States	Civic Arena (Cancelled)
July 17, 1996	Fort Wayne	United States	Allen County Arena (Rescheduled)
July 19, 1996	Moline	United States	The MARK of the Quad Cities (Rescheduled)
July 20, 1996	Kansas City	United States	Kemper Arena (Cancelled)
July 21, 1996	Saint Louis	United States	Kiel Center (Cancelled)
July 22, 1996	San Antonio	United States	Freeman Coliseum (Rescheduled)
July 23, 1996	Oklahoma City	United States	Myriad Arena (Rescheduled)
July 24, 1996	Dallas	United States	Reunion Arena (Rescheduled)
July 26, 1996	Austin	United States	Frank Erwin Center (Rescheduled)
July 27, 1996	Lafayette	United States	Cajundome (Rescheduled)
European concerts & festivals Support: Fun Lovin' Criminals
August 3, 1996	Benicàssim	Spain	Benicàssim Festival
August 5, 1996	Stockholm	Sweden	Water Festival
August 6, 1996	Oslo	Norway	Rockefeller Music Hall
August 8, 1996	Copenhagen	Denmark	Grayhalle
August 10, 1996	Osnabrück	Germany	Rock am Schloss Festival
August 12, 1996	Leipzig	Germany	Easy Auensee
August 13, 1996	Bremen	Germany	Modernes
August 14, 1996	Hamburg	Germany	Docks Konzerte
August 16, 1996	Annecy	France	Festival D'Annecy
August 17, 1996	Cologne	Germany	Bizarre Festival
August 18, 1996	Saint-Malo	France	La Route du Rock Festival
August 20, 1996	Munich	Germany	Nachtwerk
August 21, 1996	Stuttgart	Germany	Longhorn
August 23, 1996	Leopoldsburg	Belgium	Pukkelpop Festival
August 24, 1996	Reading	United Kingdom	Reading Festival
August 25, 1996	Biddinghuizen	Netherlands	Lowlands Festival
Asia and Australasia Support Acts: Pollyanna (Australia) and Ash (New Zealand)
September 28, 1996	Singapore	Singapore	Harbour Pavilion
October 1, 1996	Wan Chai	Hong Kong	Queen Elizabeth Stadium
October 3, 1996	Adelaide	Australia	Adelaide Entertainment Centre
October 5, 1996	Brisbane	Australia	Livid Festival
October 7, 1996	Sydney	Australia	Hordern Pavilion
October 8, 1996	Melbourne	Australia	Festival Hall
October 11, 1996	Auckland	New Zealand	North Shore Events Centre
October 12, 1996	Wellington	New Zealand	Queens Wharf
October 15, 1996	Tokyo	Japan	Shibuya Club Quattro
October 16, 1996	Tokyo	Japan	Shibuya Club Quattro
October 17, 1996	Nagoya	Japan	Naka-ku Club Quattro
October 18, 1996	Osaka	Japan	Chuo-Ku Club Quattro
North America arenas Supporting The Smashing Pumpkins on the Infinite Sadness tour
October 23, 1996	Ames	United States	Hilton Coliseum
October 25, 1996	Champaign	United States	Assembly Hall
October 26, 1996	Moline	United States	The MARK of the Quad Cities
October 29, 1996	Louisville	United States	Freedom Hall
October 30, 1996	Fort Wayne	United States	Memorial Coliseum
November 1, 1996	Hartford	United States	Hartford Civic Center
November 2, 1996	Albany	United States	Knickerbocker Arena
November 4, 1996	Portland	United States	Cumberland County Civic Center
November 5, 1996	Boston	United States	Fleet Center
November 6, 1996	Worcester	United States	Worcester Centrum
November 7, 1996	New York City	United States	Beacon Theatre (Headline show)
November 8, 1996	University Park	United States	Bryce Jordan Center (Cancelled)
November 9, 1996	Richmond	United States	Richmond Coliseum (Cancelled)
November 11, 1996	Columbia	United States	Carolina Coliseum
November 12, 1996	Chapel Hill	United States	Dean Smith Center
November 15, 1996	Tampa	United States	Ice Palace
November 16, 1996	Lakeland	United States	Lakeland Center
November 17, 1996	Miami	United States	Miami Arena
November 19, 1996	Atlanta	United States	The Omni
November 22, 1996	Memphis	United States	Pyramid Arena
November 23, 1996	Oklahoma City	United States	Myriad Arena
November 24, 1996	Little Rock	United States	Barton Coliseum
November 26, 1996	Lafayette	United States	Cajundome
November 27, 1996	Biloxi	United States	Mississippi Coast Coliseum
November 29, 1996	San Antonio	United States	Freeman Coliseum
November 30, 1996	Austin	United States	Frank Erwin Center
December 1, 1996	Dallas	United States	Reunion Arena
December 3, 1996	Houston	United States	The Summit
December 4, 1996	Las Cruces	United States	Pan American Center
December 5, 1996	Albuquerque	United States	Tingley Coliseum
December 7, 1996	Phoenix	United States	America West Arena
December 9, 1996	Anaheim	United States	Arrowhead Pond
December 10, 1996	Anaheim	United States	Arrowhead Pond
December 11, 1996	San Diego	United States	San Diego Sports Arena
December 13, 1996	Los Angeles	United States	Universal Amphitheatre
December 14, 1996	San Francisco	United States	Cow Palace
December 16, 1996	San Jose	United States	KROQ Almost Acoustic Christmas, San Jose Arena
December 17, 1996	Sacramento	United States	ARCO Arena
December 18, 1996	Inglewood	United States	Great Western Forum

== Promotional performances ==
Date	Show	Set
September 28. 1995	Top of The Pops	"Only Happy When it Rains", "Queer" (aired on November)
November 22, 1995	MTV's Most Wanted	"Queer", "Only Happy When it Rains"
March 20, 1996	Top of The Pops	"Stupid Girl"
March 28, 1996	TFI Friday	"Stupid Girl", "Only Happy When it Rains"
April 2, 1996	Nulle Part Ailleurs	"Queer"
April 13, 1996	Saturday Night Special	"Only Happy When it Rains"
April 14, 1996	Modern Rock Live	Modern Rock Live
June 8, 1996	MTV Movie Awards	"Only Happy When It Rains"
July 1, 1996	Beach House	"Stupid Girl"
July 11, 1996	Late Show with David Letterman	"Stupid Girl"
July 14, 1996	An Evening of Sweet Relief	"Kick My Ass", "Supernatural"
Aug 1996	MTV Europe	"Queer"
Oct 1996	Hey Hey It's Saturday	"Milk"
October 24, 1996	VH1 Fashion Awards	"Stupid Girl"
November 14, 1996	MTV Europe Music Awards	"Milk"
November 18, 1996	Top of The Pops	"Milk"

== Setlists ==
North America & Europe club tour (November 5 – December 19, 1995)

1. "Supervixen"
2. "Stupid Girl"
3. "My Lover's Box"
4. "As Heaven is Wide"
5. "Fix Me Now"
6. "Subhuman"
7. "A Stroke of Luck"
8. "Trip My Wire"
9. "Queer"
10. "Only Happy When it Rains"
11. "Not My Idea"
12. "Vow"

Encore:

1. "Milk"
2. "Girl Don't Come"

Abbreviated radio festival setlist

1. "Stupid Girl"
2. "Queer"
3. "Only Happy When it Rains"
4. "Not My Idea"
5. "Vow"

The first full concert in Minneapolis saw Garbage debut a fourteen-song set, launching with "Supervixen". The initial set included eleven songs from their debut album and three b-sides: "Subhuman", "Girl Don't Come" and "Trip My Wire". For radio festivals, Garbage performed around five tracks, usually starting with "Stupid Girl".

North America, Europe, Japan & Australasia (February 23 – October 18, 1996)

1. "Queer"
2. "Fix Me Now"
3. "Not My Idea"
4. "Dog New Tricks"
5. "My Lover's Box"
6. "Milk"
7. "Supervixen"
8. "Stupid Girl"
9. "Trip My Wire"
10. "Only Happy When it Rains"
11. "Vow"

Encore:

1. "Subhuman"
2. "Kick My Ass"
3. "Girl Don't Come"

Garbage launched their 1996 tour in Dallas, Texas by reordering the set, swapping "Subhuman" and "Milk" around and moving "Queer" to the start of the night. The arrangement of "Queer" is based upon a Danny Saber remix of the song. Garbage debuted an electronica version of "Dog New Tricks" and a cover version of Vic Chesnutt's "Kick My Ass" at the start of the run, while also dropping both "As Heaven is Wide" and "A Stroke of Luck". This set list remains largely unchanged for over six months, although "Subhuman" is dropped following a performance in Boston's Avalon, and both the song and "As Heaven is Wide" are intermittently played as an encore towards the end of the run.

North America (October 23 – December 20, 1996)

1. "Queer"
2. "Fix Me Now"
3. "Not My Idea"
4. "My Lover's Box"
5. "Supernatural", replaced later with "#1 Crush"
6. "Trip My Wire"
7. "Stupid Girl"
8. "Only Happy When it Rains"
9. "Vow"

The end of 1996 and Garbage's support slot for the Smashing Pumpkins meant that the band finished the year performing an abbreviated set. Apart from at one final headline show in New York City's Beacon Theatre, "Supervixen", "Dog New Tricks", "Kick My Ass" and "Girl Don't Come" are retired. Garbage perform a new guitar-heavy arrangement of "Milk" a number of times before it is dropped. The run of shows also saw Garbage debut two songs live: a second Vic Chesnutt cover version ("Supernatural") and their early b-side "#1 Crush", which later replaces it.

== Box office score data ==
Date	Show	Venue	City	Tickets sold / available	Gross revenue
June 1, 1996	HFStival	Robert. F. Kennedy Memorial Stadium	Washington, D.C.	64,252 / 64,252 (100%)	N/A
November 1, 1996	Smashing Pumpkins/Garbage	Hartford Civic Center	Hartford, Connecticut	11,840 / 11,840 (100%)	$296,000
November 2, 1996	Smashing Pumpkins/Garbage	Knickerbocker Arena	Albany, New York	12, 434 / 12, 434 (100%)	$310,850
November 26, 1996	Smashing Pumpkins/Garbage	Cajundome	Lafayette, Louisiana	10,682 / 10,682 (100%)	$267,050
