= Libro =

Japanese book retailer

Libro logo

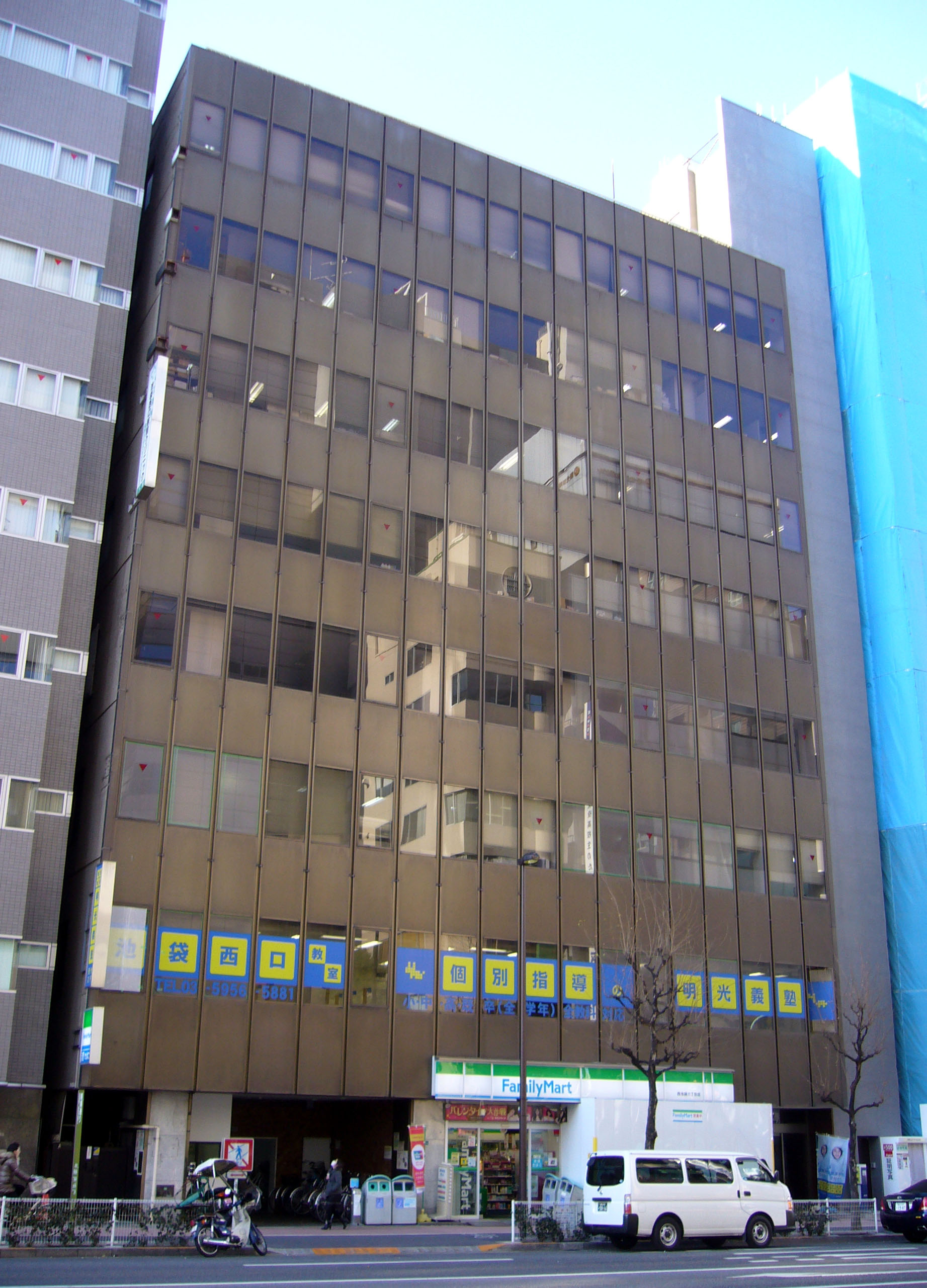
Meiko Building, the headquarters

Libro Co., Ltd. (株式会社リブロ, Kabushiki gaisha Riburo) is a Japanese book retailer. A unit of the Seiyu Group, it is headquartered in the Meiko Building (明光ビル, Meiko Biru), Nishi-Ikebukuro, Toshima, Tokyo.

Libro is the Spanish and Italian word for "book"
