= Temptation Waits =

1999 song by Garbage

Promotional single by Garbage

from the album Version 2.0
- Released: June 20, 1999
- Recorded: 1997–1998
- Studio: Smart Studios, Madison, Wisconsin
- Genre: Pop
- Length: 4:37
- Label: Mushroom Records UK
- Songwriter: Garbage
- Producer: Garbage

"Temptation Waits" is a song by American rock band Garbage from their second studio album Version 2.0 (1998).

The song was released as an airplay-only sixth single in Spain to mark the year-long chart run of Version 2.0 on the Spanish album charts, and to mark its certification of the European Platinum Award by the International Federation of the Phonographic Industry for 1 million sales of Version 2.0 across Europe.

In North America, "Temptation Waits" was licensed to the television series Angel, Dawson's Creek, The Sopranos, and Buffy the Vampire Slayer, and was included on the 1999 tie-in Buffy the Vampire Slayer: The Album.

== Recording and production ==
Garbage began writing their second album, which would go under the working title of Sad Alcoholic Clowns, in March 1997 in the band's label-head Jerry Moss's Friday Harbor, Washington, vacation house. The group demoed and made rough outlines for new songs, of which "Temptation" was one. When they felt they had made a good start, Garbage took the work they made in Washington back to their Madison, Wisconsin base at Smart Studios and begin fleshing out the ideas and rough sketches over the following year.

Garbage intended their second album to build upon the framework, music style and musical template laid down by their first release; to create a rapprochement between the "high-tech and low-down, the now sound and of golden memories" and wear musical references to the 1960s, 1970s and 1980s: the production of "Temptation" nodded towards Isaac Hayes and Donna Summer's disco period; Garbage recorded all of their work for the second album through a 48-track digital system digitally, direct to hard drives utilizing a 24bit Pro Tools rig.

Much of the percussion was recorded in a disused candy factory located in Madison; Butch Vig, Marker and sound engineer Billy Bush set up a drum kit within the factory and recorded various fills, utilising the acoustics of the dilapidated building. Forced to stop after local police officers responded to complaints about the noise, some of the percussion was later incorporated into "Temptation Waits" (and also found its way into "I Think I'm Paranoid" and "Hammering in My Head"). The guitars would typically be run through either a filter or a wah wah pedal, and then gated off a sixteenth-note pulse to create a keyboard-like effect. Instead of using synth bass, Garbage had Daniel Shulman perform electric bass on "Temptation", mixed in with sub-bass. The band had wanted to use a theremin to create the whistle-like melodic line on the outro, and had hired one for use at the studio. The band couldn't perform the instrument well, and so utilized a sound created by an analog modeling synthesizer instead.

Garbage completed recording, producing and mixing of their second album in mid-February 1998, and the album was given the title Version 2.0. "Temptation", which had by now been finalized as "Temptation Waits", was tracklisted as the album's opening song. Version 2.0 was released worldwide on May 11 of that year; despite a slow start, Version 2.0 went on to equal its predecessor, selling over four million copies and achieving platinum-certification in many territories, including United States, Canada, United Kingdom, Europe and Australia.

== Live performances ==
"Temptation Waits" was performed at almost every show on the Version 2.0 tour; where it began as a mid-set inclusion before being promoted to open each show. Once established as the setlist opener, "Temptation Waits" was intro-taped by a recording of a section of the 4th Movement of Mahler's "Symphony No. 5", famously used in the climax scene of the 1971 movie Death in Venice. During the last leg of the tour in 1999, it was replaced as opener by "#1 Crush" and moved back into the mid-set, and led into by a sample of voice-over dialogue from the trailer to the 1965 exploitation film Bad Girls Go to Hell. "Temptation Waits" was initially absent from the BeautifulGarbage tour set-list, but returned to the band's live set in mid-2002 where it remained a common feature of the band's show until the end of that year. "Temptation Waits" was not performed again until 2012, when it once again became a regular in the setlist.

A live version of "Temptation Waits" recorded at the Roskilde Festival, Denmark in June 1998 was included on the repackaged Version 2.0 Special Live Edition, released by Mushroom Records the following year.

== Critical reception ==
"Temptation Waits" received a mostly positive reception from music critics around the time of Version 2.0s release. Billboard journalist Bradley Bambarger wrote that the song's "slice of predatory swagger opens the album in fine style, with an '80s pop sound a la Psychedelic Furs updated with aplomb" and added that the song showed the band was "burgeoning [with] songwriting prowess". David Stubbs of Uncut wrote, "With its whiplash backbeat and matt black exteriors, ["Temptation..."] sets the tone – like some PVC panther, Shirley Manson establishes the character she maintains throughout the album, taunting, sensual, predatory, desperate, self-loathing, nasty". In a review for MTV Online, Alexandra Flood wrote: "It's a rock/disco anthem about obsessive love. Continuous changing movements make it not only good, but also interesting. "Temptation Waits" is in itself a wolf in sheep's clothing. It comes on subdued at first, but opens up into a memorable, downright danceable, single-bound song." Peter Murphy of Hot Press compared the song's "claustrophobic meshes of flesh and technology" thematic to the protagonist of Shinya Tsukamoto’s 1989 cyberpunk film Tetsuo.

== Charts ==
Chart performance for "Temptation Waits"
Chart (1999)	Peak position
Spain Top 40 Airplay Chart (AFYVE)	39

== Release history ==
Release history and formats for "Temptation Waits"
Territory	Release date	Record label	Format(s)
Spain	June 20, 1999	RCA/BMG Espagna	Airplay
