= Radio festival =

A radio festival is a music show featuring live bands that are created and promoted solely by commercial radio stations or media conglomerates. Often, bands are not paid for their performances, but they are given free air play in addition to the exposure received by the promotion of the festival.
