= Combined Locks, Wisconsin =

- Village
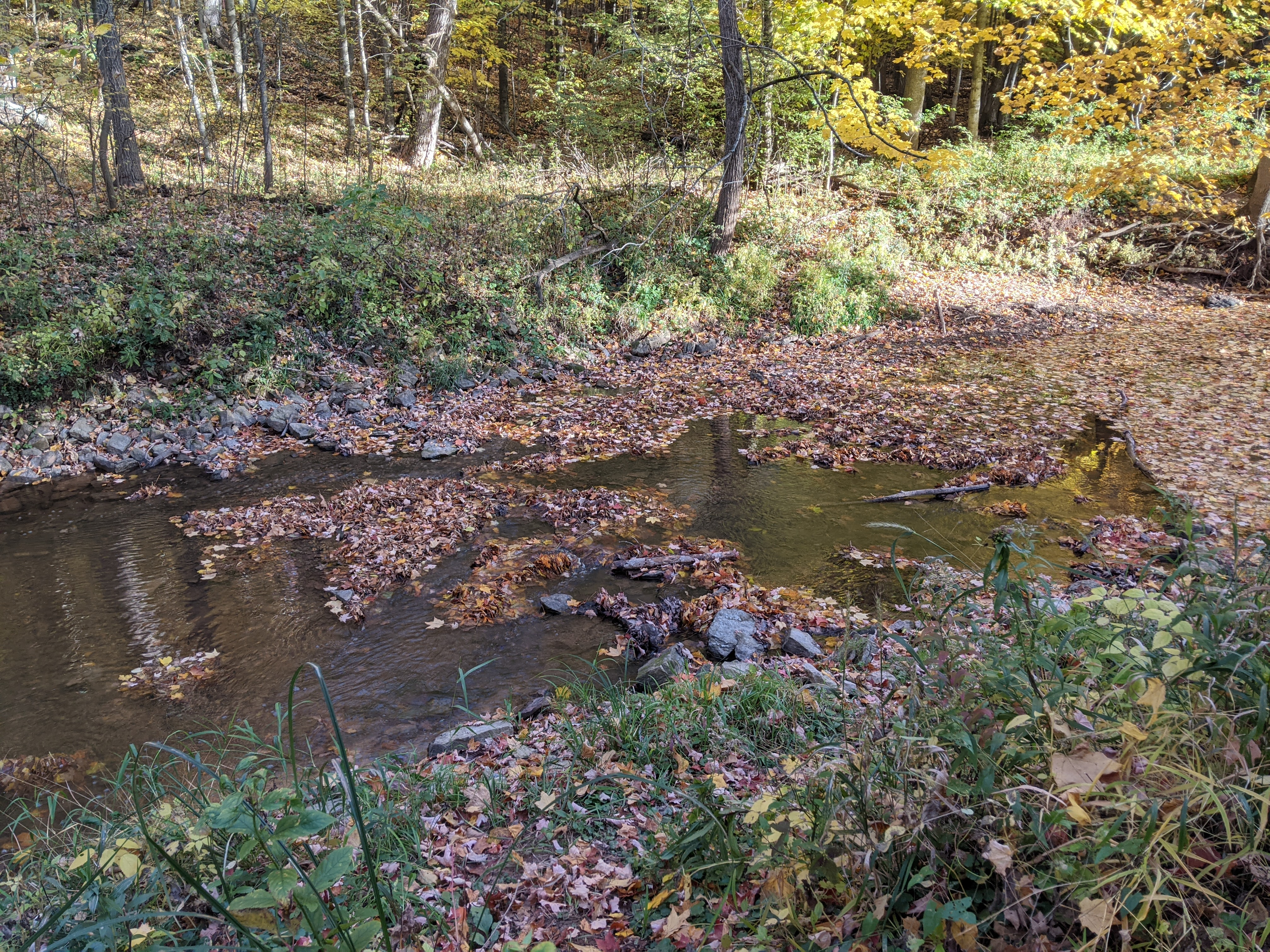
- Garner's Creek in Combined Locks

- Location of Combined Locks in Outagamie County, Wisconsin.
- Coordinates: 44°16′N 88°19′W
- Country: United States
- State: Wisconsin
- County: Outagamie

Area
  - Total: 1.90 sq mi (4.93 km^{2})
  - Land: 1.71 sq mi (4.44 km^{2})
  - Water: 0.19 sq mi (0.49 km^{2})
- Elevation: 725 ft (221 m)

Population (2020)
  - Total: 3,634
  - Density: 2,120/sq mi (818/km^{2})
- Time zone: UTC-6 (Central (CST))
  - Summer (DST): UTC-5 (CDT)
- Area code: 920
- FIPS code: 55-16500
- GNIS feature ID: 1563292
- Website: https://www.combinedlocks.wi.gov/

Combined Locks is a village in Outagamie County, Wisconsin, United States. The population was 3,634 at the 2020 census. It is a part of the Appleton, Wisconsin Metropolitan Statistical Area.

== History ==
A post office called Combined Locks has been in operation since 1892. The village was named from the canal locks near the town site. It was founded in 1920.

== Geography ==
Combined Locks is located at 44°16′N 88°19′W (44.2649, -88.3120).

According to the United States Census Bureau, the village has a total area of 1.89 square miles (4.90 km^{2}), of which 1.71 square miles (4.43 km^{2}) is land and 0.18 square miles (0.47 km^{2}) is water.

== Demographics ==
Historical population
Census	Pop.	Note	%±
1930	545		—
1940	625		14.7%
1950	720		15.2%
1960	1,421		97.4%
1970	2,771		95.0%
1980	2,573		−7.1%
1990	2,190		−14.9%
2000	2,422		10.6%
2010	3,328		37.4%
2020	3,634		9.2%
U.S. Decennial Census

=== 2010 census ===
As of the census of 2010, there were 3,328 people, 1,232 households, and 953 families living in the village. The population density was 1,946.2 inhabitants per square mile (751.4/km^{2}). There were 1,263 housing units at an average density of 738.6 per square mile (285.2/km^{2}). The racial makeup of the village was 96.7% White, 0.2% African American, 0.6% Native American, 1.5% Asian, 0.1% Pacific Islander, 0.3% from other races, and 0.6% from two or more races. Hispanic or Latino of any race were 2.0% of the population.

There were 1,232 households, of which 39.4% had children under the age of 18 living with them, 68.6% were married couples living together, 5.4% had a female householder with no husband present, 3.3% had a male householder with no wife present, and 22.6% were non-families. 18.8% of all households were made up of individuals, and 8.5% had someone living alone who was 65 years of age or older. The average household size was 2.70 and the average family size was 3.12.

The median age in the village was 38.8 years. 28.5% of residents were under the age of 18; 5.1% were between the ages of 18 and 24; 27.3% were from 25 to 44; 25% were from 45 to 64; and 14.2% were 65 years of age or older. The gender makeup of the village was 50.1% male and 49.9% female.

=== 2000 census ===
As of the census of 2000, there were 2,422 people, 884 households, and 716 families living in the village. The population density was 1,591.3 people per square mile (615.2/km^{2}). There were 903 housing units at an average density of 593.3 per square mile (229.4/km^{2}). The racial makeup of the village was 98.27% White, 0.17% African American, 0.41% Native American, 0.45% Asian, 0.25% from other races, and 0.45% from two or more races. Hispanic or Latino of any race were 1.24% of the population.

There were 884 households, out of which 37.1% had children under the age of 18 living with them, 72.7% were married couples living together, 6.0% had a female householder with no husband present, and 18.9% were non-families. 15.6% of all households were made up of individuals, and 5.8% had someone living alone who was 65 years of age or older. The average household size was 2.74 and the average family size was 3.06.

In the village, the population was spread out, with 27.8% under the age of 18, 6.1% from 18 to 24, 31.6% from 25 to 44, 24.2% from 45 to 64, and 10.3% who were 65 years of age or older. The median age was 36 years. For every 100 females, there were 101.2 males. For every 100 females age 18 and over, there were 98.8 males.

The median income for a household in the village was $53,125, and the median income for a family was $56,131. Males had a median income of $42,135 versus $25,583 for females. The per capita income for the village was $24,090. About 0.5% of families and 0.8% of the population were below the poverty line, including none of those under age 18 and 4.8% of those age 65 or over.
