= 20 Years Queer =

2015 concert tour by Garbage

- Tour by Garbage
- Promotional poster for the tour
- Associated album: Garbage
- Start date: October 6, 2015
- End date: November 14, 2015
- Legs: 2
- No. of shows: 16 in North America; 11 in Europe; 27 total
- Supporting acts: Torres; Dutch Uncles

Garbage concert chronology
- Not Your Kind of People World Tour (2012–2013); 20 Years Queer (2015); Strange Little Birds Tour (2016)

20 Years Queer was a concert tour by American rock band Garbage, to mark the twentieth anniversary of their debut album Garbage. The title also references the band's early single "Queer", and the promotional poster is redolent of the self-titled album's pink feather artwork. The tour was preceded by a special 20-year edition of the record, which was re-mastered and featured remixes and previously unreleased versions of album tracks. Garbage performed the album in its entirety as well as all the B-sides recorded during that period.

== Tour announcement ==
The commemorative tour was initially announced in March with shows confirmed in Paris and London, and was expected to travel to a number of cities worldwide. Further European dates, including a "homecoming" concert in Edinburgh, were announced over the following three months. The entire itinerary of North American dates were announced in June 2015.

Upon the announcement of the tour, Shirley Manson stated: "This is the album that started everything for us and we look back on it with great fondness. It’s been really great to revisit these songs whilst working on new material – interesting to see how the essence of the band remains strong as we evolve". Guitarist Steve Marker later commented: "We're just as surprised to be here now, intact, so many years later, enthusiastically preparing to get back on the road with that album...A big piece of our lives remains caught up in the making of that record, and we know it holds a special place for the fans that have kept us going for so long".

Garbage was supported on North American shows by singer/songwriter Torres. Support on all European shows, except Moscow, was provided by indie pop band Dutch Uncles.

== Setlists ==
San Diego (October 6, 2015)

1. "Subhuman"
2. "Supervixen"
3. "Queer"
4. "Only Happy When It Rains"
5. "As Heaven Is Wide"
6. "Not My Idea"
7. "A Stroke of Luck"
8. "Girl Don't Come"
9. "Butterfly Collector"
10. "Trip My Wire"
11. "Sleep"
12. "Vow"
13. "Stupid Girl"
14. "Dog New Tricks"
15. "My Lover's Box"
16. "Fix Me Now"
17. "Milk"
1. "Kick My Ass
2. "Driving Lesson"
3. "Push It"
4. "Cherry Lips"
5. "#1 Crush"
London (November 8, 2015)

1. "Subhuman"
2. "Supervixen"
3. "Queer"
4. "Girl Don't Come"
5. "As Heaven Is Wide"
6. "Not My Idea"
7. "A Stroke of Luck"
8. "Butterfly Collector"
9. "Trip My Wire"
10. "Milk"
11. "Fix Me Now"
12. "My Lover's Box"
13. "Sleep"
14. "#1 Crush"
15. "Stupid Girl"
16. "Dog New Tricks"
17. "Only Happy When It Rains"
18. "Vow"
1. "Kick My Ass"
2. "Driving Lesson"
3. "Automatic Systematic Habit"
4. "When I Grow Up"

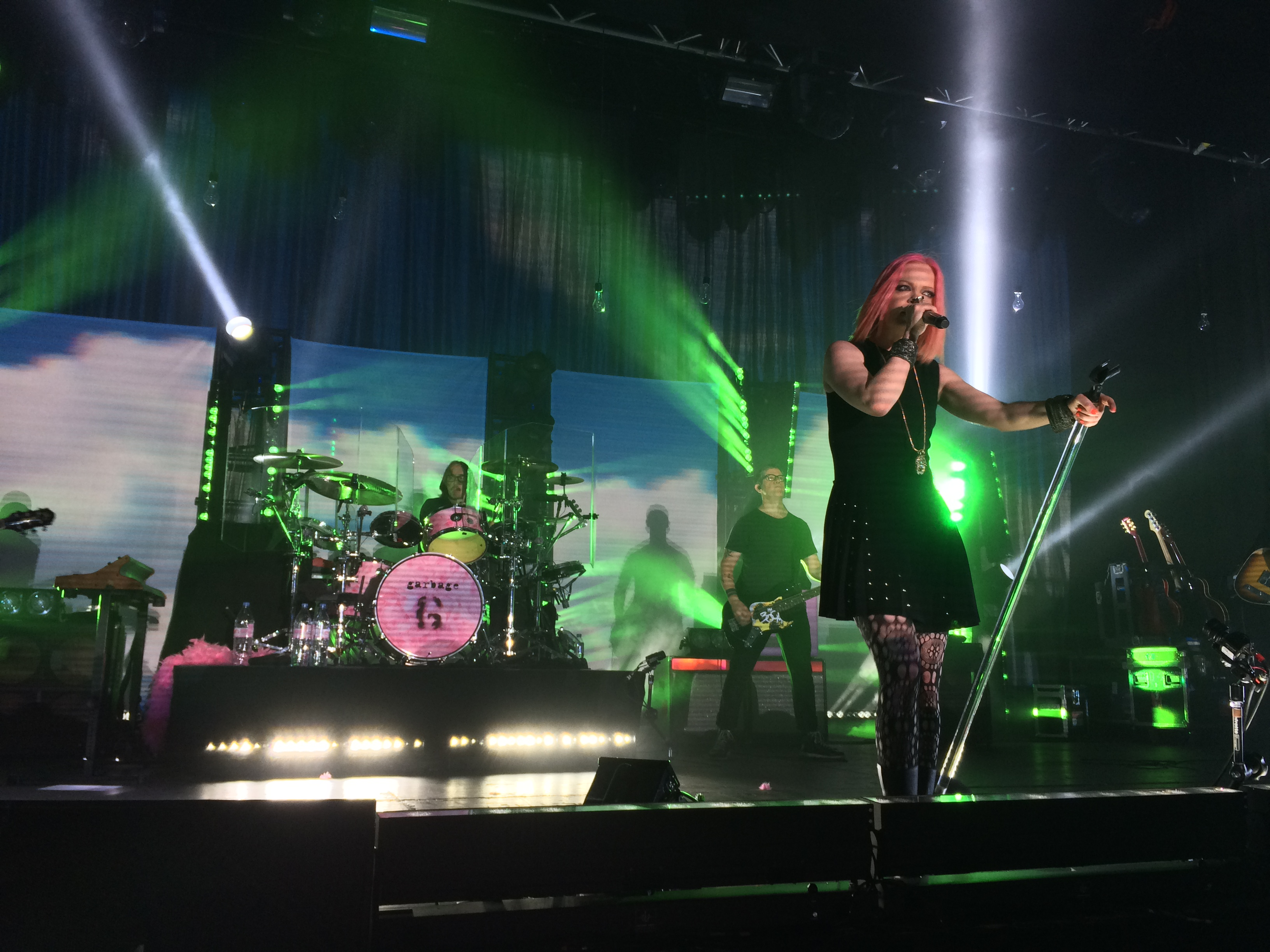
Garbage perform "As Heaven Is Wide" at Manchester Academy. Shirley Manson quoted lines from the Lord's Prayer during the song outro.

Around 15 minutes before showtime, a large white curtain dropped down in front of the stage. The live show was preceded by an introductory video compiled from footage of Garbage on their first tour and pop cultural moments of the era, sound-tracked by the bands largely-instrumental B-side "Alien Sex Fiend". The video was projected onto the curtain, which the band performed "Subhuman" behind, lit up in silhouette; the curtain dropped to the floor as soon as "Supervixen" began.

The initial North American shows featured the set split into blocks of six album tracks, then a batch of B-sides, followed by the remaining album tracks and then again, B-sides, in almost running order on disc. Further into the tour, the set order was rejigged to flow better live. The end of each night featured two bonus tracks from other eras of the band's career. These were picked from a rotation of: "Push It", "I Think I'm Paranoid" or "When I Grow Up" from Version 2.0; "Cherry Lips" from Beautiful Garbage; "Bad Boyfriend" or "Why Do You Love Me" from Bleed Like Me; or "Automatic Systematic Habit" from Not Your Kind of People.

== Tour dates ==
Date	City	Country	Venue
North America
October 6, 2015	San Diego	United States	Humphrey's Concerts By The Bay
October 7, 2015	Oakland	United States	Fox Oakland Theatre
October 8, 2015	Los Angeles	United States	Greek Theater
October 10, 2015	Las Vegas	United States	Blvd Pool, Cosmopolitan Hotel
October 13, 2015	Houston	United States	Bayou Music Center
October 14, 2015	Austin	United States	Stubb's Waller Creek Amphitheater
October 15, 2015	Dallas	United States	South Side Ballroom
October 17, 2015	Chicago	United States	Riviera Theatre
October 18, 2015	Madison	United States	Orpheum Theatre
October 19, 2015	Royal Oak	United States	Royal Oak Music Theatre
October 21, 2015	Boston	United States	Orpheum Theatre
October 23, 2015	Westbury	United States	The Space At Westbury
October 24, 2015	New York City	United States	Kings Theater
October 25, 2015	Toronto	Canada	Phoenix Concert Theatre
October 28, 2015	Washington, D.C.	United States	9:30 Club
October 29, 2015	Washington, D.C.	United States	9:30 Club
Europe
October 31, 2015	Cologne	Germany	Palladium
November 1, 2015	Århus	Denmark	Train
November 2, 2015	Copenhagen	Denmark	Store Vega
November 4, 2015	Tilburg	Netherlands	013
November 5, 2015	Brussels	Belgium	Forest National
November 7, 2015	Paris	France	Zénith de Paris
November 8, 2015	London	England	02 Academy
November 9, 2015	London	England	02 Academy
November 11, 2015	Moscow	Russia	Crocus City Hall
November 13, 2015	Manchester	England	Manchester Academy
November 14, 2015	Edinburgh	Scotland	Usher Hall

== Promotional performances ==
Date	Show	Set
September 30, 2015	Kevin and Bean	"#1 Crush", "Only Happy When It Rains"
October 2, 2015	Reddit AMA/Periscope	"#1 Crush"
