= List of awards and nominations received by Garbage =

Garbage's awards and nominations
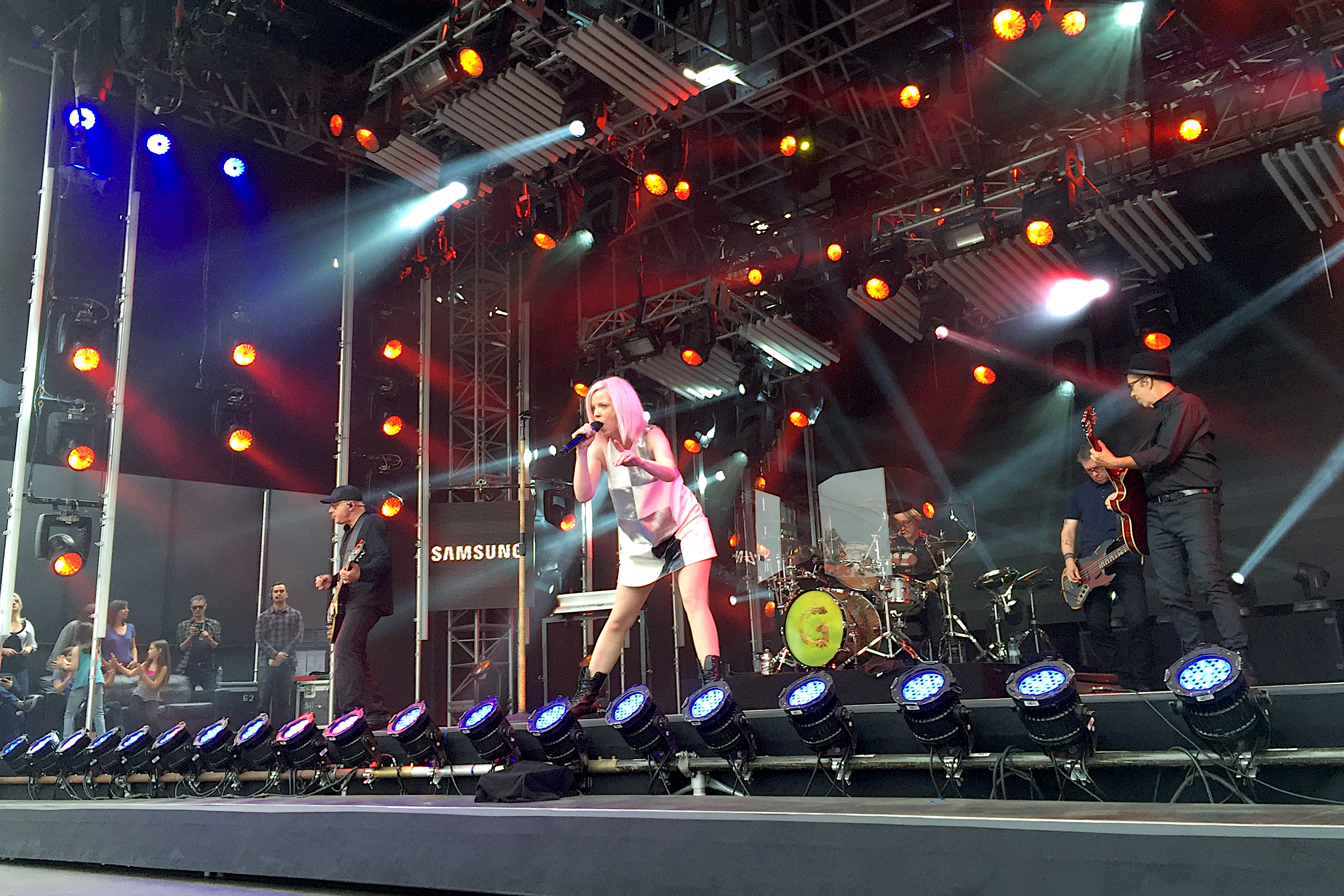
- Garbage performing live in 2016.
Awards and nominations
Award	Wins	Nominations
Grammy Awards	0	7
BRIT Awards	0	2
MTV Europe Music Awards	1	5
MTV Video Music Awards	1	11
MTV Movie Awards	0	1
BMI Awards	2	2
Wisconsin Area Music Industry Awards	2	3

Totals (Note: Certain award groups do not simply award one winner. They acknowledge several different recipients, have runners-up, and have third place. Since this is a specific recognition and is different from losing an award, runner-up mentions are considered wins in this award tally. For simplification and to avoid errors, each award in this list has been presumed to have had a prior nomination.)
- Wins: 17
- Nominations: 57

This is a complete listing of awards and nominations received by American rock band Garbage. Since forming in 1993, the band have sold a combined total of 17 million records internationally.

Over the course of their career, Garbage have received 57 nominations, winning 17 awards. In 1997 they were nominated for three Grammy Awards – the Grammy Award for Best New Artist, the Grammy Award for Best Rock Song (for "Stupid Girl") and the Grammy Award for Best Rock Performance by a Duo or Group with Vocal (again for "Stupid Girl"). Their second studio album, Version 2.0, was nominated for the Grammy Award for Album of the Year and the Grammy Award for Best Rock Album in 1999. The bands single "Special" was nominated for the Grammy Award for Best Rock Song, as well as the award for Best Rock Performance by a Duo or Group in 2000. In 1996, they were nominated for two BRIT Awards – Best International Band and Best International Newcomer.

In 1996, they were named Breakthrough Artist at the 1996 MTV Europe Music Awards, and were nominated for a further two awards on the night – Best Group and Best Song for "Stupid Girl". Their 1998 single "Push It" received eight nominations at the 1998 MTV Video Music Awards for Best Group Video, Best Alternative Video, Breakthrough Video, Best Direction, Best Editing, Best Art Direction, Best Cinematography and Best Special Effect. In 1999, they won the award for Best Special Effects for the music video for the single "Special" at the 1999 MTV Video Music Awards.

== List of awards ==
=== Billboard Music Video Awards ===
Year	Nominee / work	Award	Result	Ref.
1999	"Special"	Best Modern Rock Clip	Nominated	

=== D&AD Awards ===
- D&AD Awards

Year	Nominee / work	Award	Result
1999	"Special"	Best Direction in Pop Promo Video (Silver)	Won

=== Danish Music Awards ===
- Danish Music Awards

Year	Nominee / work	Award	Result
1996	"Stupid Girl"	Best Rock Song	Nominated

=== Gaffa Awards ===
- Gaffa

Year	Nominee / work	Award	Result	Ref.
1995	Themselves	Best Foreign New Act	Won	
1996	Themselves	Best Foreign New Act	Won	
1998	Themselves	Best Foreign Group	Nominated	
1998	Themselves	Best Foreign Live Act	Nominated	
1998	Version 2.0	Best Foreign Album	Nominated	

=== Grammy Awards ===
- Grammy Awards:

Year	Category	Recipient/Work	Result	Winner
1997	Best New Artist	Garbage	Nominated	LeAnn Rimes
1997	Best Rock Song	"Stupid Girl"	Nominated	Tracy Chapman "Give Me One Reason"
1997	Best Rock Performance by a Duo or Group	"Stupid Girl"	Nominated	Dave Matthews Band "So Much to Say"
1999	Album of the Year	Version 2.0	Nominated	Lauryn Hill The Miseducation of Lauryn Hill
1999	Best Rock Album	Version 2.0	Nominated	Sheryl Crow The Globe Sessions
2000	Best Rock Song	"Special"	Nominated	Red Hot Chili Peppers "Scar Tissue"
2000	Best Rock Performance by a Duo or Group	"Special"	Nominated	Santana and Everlast "Put Your Lights On"

=== BRIT Awards ===
- BRIT Awards:

Year	Category	Recipient/Work	Result	Winner
1996	Best International Band	Garbage	Nominated	Bon Jovi
1996	Best International Newcomer	Garbage	Nominated	Alanis Morissette

=== Hungarian Music Awards ===
- Hungarian Music Awards

Year	Category	Recipient/Work	Result
2002	Best Foreign Rock Album	Beautifulgarbage	Nominated

=== International Dance Music Awards ===
- International Dance Music Awards

Year	Nominee / work	Award	Result
1999	"Push It"	Best Alternative 12'	Nominated

=== Kerrang! Awards ===
Year	Nominee / work	Award	Result	Ref.
1996	Butch Vig	Kerrang! Creativity Award	Won	

=== Lunas del Auditorio ===
Year	Nominee / work	Award	Result
2003	Themselves	Best Foreign Rock Artist	Nominated
2006	Themselves	Best Foreign Rock Artist	Nominated

=== MM Music Awards ===
MM Music Awards

Year	Nominee / work	Award	Result
2002	"Cherry Lips"	Best International Video	Nominated

=== MTV Europe Music Awards ===
- MTV Europe Music Awards:

Year	Category	Recipient/Work	Result	Winner
1996	Breakthrough	Garbage	Won	Garbage
1996	Best Group	Garbage	Nominated	Oasis
1996	Best Song	"Stupid Girl"	Nominated	Oasis "Wonderwall"
1998	Best Group	Garbage	Nominated	Spice Girls
1998	Best Rock Act	Garbage	Nominated	Aerosmith
1998	Best Video	"Push It"	Nominated	Massive Attack "Teardrop"
2013	Best World Stage Performance	Garbage	Nominated	Linkin Park - WS Monterrey, Mexico 2012

=== MTV Video Music Awards ===
- MTV Video Music Awards:

Year	Category	Recipient/Work	Result	Winner
1996	Breakthrough Video	"Queer"	Nominated	The Smashing Pumpkins "Tonight, Tonight"
1996	Best New Artist in a Video	"Stupid Girl"	Nominated	Alanis Morissette "Ironic"
1998	Best Group Video	"Push It"	Nominated	Backstreet Boys "Everybody (Backstreet's Back)"
1998	Best Alternative Video	"Push It"	Nominated	Green Day "Good Riddance (Time of Your Life)"
1998	Breakthrough Video	"Push It"	Nominated	The Prodigy "Smack My Bitch Up"
1998	Best Direction	"Push It"	Nominated	Madonna "Ray of Light"
1998	Best Editing	"Push It"	Nominated	Madonna "Ray of Light"
1998	Best Art Direction	"Push It"	Nominated	Björk "Bachelorette"
1998	Best Cinematography	"Push It"	Nominated	Fiona Apple "Criminal"
1998	Best Special Effects	"Push It"	Nominated	Madonna "Frozen"
1999	Best Special Effects	"Special"	Won	Garbage "Special"

=== MTV Movie Awards ===
- MTV Movie Awards:

Year	Category	Recipient/Work	Result	Winner
1997	Best Song From a Movie	"#1 Crush"	Nominated	Bush "Machinehead"

=== MVPA Awards ===
Year	Nominee / work	Award	Result
1999	"Push It"	Best Make-Up	Won
1999	"Push It"	Best Hair	Nominated
1999	"Push It"	Best Styling	Nominated
1999	"Push It"	Best Alternative Video	Nominated
1999	"Special"	Best Special Effects	Nominated
2006	"Bleed Like Me"	Director of the Year	Nominated
2008	"Tell Me Where It Hurts"	Director of the Year	Nominated

=== Music Television Awards ===
Year	Nominee / work	Award	Result
1996	Garbage	Best Breakthrough	Won
1996	Garbage	Best Alternative	Won
1996	Garbage	Best Group	Nominated
1996	Garbage	Best Album	Nominated
1996	"Stupid Girl"	Best Song	Nominated
1996	"Queer"	Best Video	Nominated
1998	"Push It"	Best Video	Won
1998	Garbage	Best Group	Nominated
1998	Garbage	Best Rock Act	Nominated

=== Music Week Awards ===
- Music Week Awards

Year	Nominee / work	Award	Result
1999	"Special"	Best Special Effects	Nominated

=== NME Awards ===
- NME Awards

Year	Nominee / work	Award	Result
1996	Themselves	Best New Band	Nominated
1999	Themselves	Best Band	Nominated
1999	Version 2.0	Best Album	Nominated
1999	"I Think I'm Paranoid"	Best Single	Nominated

=== Online Film & Television Association ===
Year	Nominee / work	Award	Result	Ref.
1999	"The World Is Not Enough"	Best Original Song	Nominated	

=== Pollstar Concert Industry Awards ===
- Pollstar Concert Industry Awards

Year	Nominee / work	Award	Result	Ref.
1997	Garbage	Best New Artist Tour	Nominated	
2022	Garbage	Best Support/Special Guest Act and Tour	Won	

=== BMI Awards ===
- BMI Awards:

Year	Category	Recipient/Work	Result
1997	Citation of Achievement - Best Pop Award	"Stupid Girl"	Won
1999	Citation of Achievement - Best Pop Award	"Special"	Won

=== VH1 Fashion Awards ===
- VH1 Fashion Awards

Year	Nominee / work	Award	Result
1999	"Special"	Visionary Award	Won

=== WAMI Awards ===
- Wisconsin Area Music Industry Awards:

Year	Category	Recipient/Work	Result	Winner
1997	Song of the Year	"Stupid Girl"	Won	-
1999	Song of the Year	"Special"	Won	-
2000	Song of the Year	"The World Is Not Enough"	Nominated	Citizen King "Better Days"
2002	Best Rock/Alternative/Metal	Garbage	Won	-

=== Žebřík Music Awards ===
Year	Nominee / work	Award	Result	Ref.
1998	Shirley Manson	Best International Female	Nominated	
1999	Shirley Manson	Best International Female	Nominated	
2001	Shirley Manson	Best International Female	Nominated	
2005	Shirley Manson	Best International Female	Nominated	
2005	Garbage	Best International Group	Nominated	
