= Garbage Video =

Video by Garbage
- Released: November 12, 1996
- Recorded: 1995–1996; Glasgow & London, United Kingdom; Los Angeles & Madison, United States
- Genre: Alternative rock, electronica
- Length: 30:00
- Label: Mushroom Records UK; Almo Sights & Sounds/Geffen (North America)
- Producer: Garbage

Garbage chronology
Garbage Video (1996)	Absolute Garbage (2007)

Garbage Video, also known as Home Video, was a 1996 short-form VHS and Video CD release that included all of Garbage's promotional music videos filmed until that point. Garbage Video was directed by Karen Lamond and produced by Luke Copeland for Oil Factory Films.

Garbage Video was the last major release to promote parent album Garbage and was issued by Almo Sights & Sounds/Geffen in North America and by Mushroom Records worldwide. Unlike a number of other music video compilations, Garbage Video has never been re-issued on the DVD format. It was superseded by the 2007 DVD release of Absolute Garbage.

== Track listing ==
1. "Vow" – 4:30
2. "Only Happy When It Rains" (U.S. Version) – 3:56
3. "Queer" – 4:36
4. "Stupid Girl" – 4:18
5. "Sleep" (Bonus track)
6. "Milk" – 3:53

== Video release ==
Garbage Video includes footage shot at the band's March 21, 1996, headline concert at London's Brixton Academy, and outtakes from the shoots for the videos for "Only Happy When It Rains", "Queer" and "Stupid Girl" which are over-dubbed with a remix soundtrack by Rabbit in the Moon, Danny Saber and Red Snapper. Karen Lamond was given hours of personal footage by the band to edit through The video also includes a mini-clip for b-side "Sleep" shot by Garbage in Smart Studios in Madison, WI, Wisconsin.

Garbage intended the video release to show their "very strong visual identity", while stressing that their definite film piece would follow the next year, pushing "very hard at the conventional barriers associated with band video/short film-making".

== VCD release ==
The material from Garbage Video was also released in the form of Video CD added as an extra to the Hong Kong version of the 2nd Garbage album Version 2.0.

== Credits and personnel ==
Music video directors

- Samuel Bayer ("Vow", "Only Happy When It Rains" and "Stupid Girl")
- Stéphane Sednaoui ("Queer" and "Milk")
- Karen Lamond ("Sleep")

Remixes

- "Queer": Danny Saber and Rabbit in the Moon
- "Stupid Girl": Danny Saber and Red Snapper

== Charts ==
Chart performance for Garbage Video
Chart (1996)	Peak position
UK Music Video (Official Charts Company)	12
US Top Music Videos (Billboard)	10
