= Only Happy When It Rains =

1995 single by Garbage

Single by Garbage

from the album Garbage
- B-side: "Girl Don't Come"; "Sleep"
- Released: September 18, 1995
- Recorded: 1994–1995
- Studio: Smart (Madison, Wisconsin)
- Genre: Alternative rock; electronic rock; post-grunge; gothic pop
- Length: 3:56
- Label: Mushroom; Almo Sounds
- Songwriter: Garbage
- Producer: Garbage

Garbage singles chronology
"Queer" (1995)	"Only Happy When It Rains" (1995)	"Stupid Girl" (1996)

Music video
- "Only Happy When It Rains" on YouTube

"Only Happy When It Rains" is an alternative rock song written and produced by American alternative rock band Garbage for their self-titled debut studio album (1995). It was recorded at the band's own studio, Smart Studios, in Madison, Wisconsin, and is known for its tongue-in-cheek lyrics parodying the typically angst-filled themes of mid-'90s alternative rock.

Replacing "Queer" at the last-minute as the lead-in single for the debut album, "Only Happy When It Rains" was the band's breakthrough track in the United Kingdom, receiving positive reviews from the music press and strong support from BBC Radio One. In the United States, the single built upon the success of "Queer" at alternative radio and in early 1996 charted strongly on the Hot 100.

The accompanying music video, directed by Samuel Bayer, made MTV's next-big-thing Buzz Bin category, helping "Only Happy When It Rains" to cross over to Top 40 radio formats, and propelling the album Garbage from being a Heatseeker title into the top half of the Billboard 200 album chart. In Europe, where it was the fourth single from Garbage, it followed the success of "Stupid Girl", by reaching the top ten European Alternative Rock airplay charts over the summer of 1996.

"Only Happy When It Rains" is one of Garbage's enduring works, covered by multiple artists, including Metallica, featured as a playable track in the video game Guitar Hero 5, and heard in episodes of '90s television shows such as Homicide: Life on the Street and The X-Files. In 2019, it was used in the Captain Marvel soundtrack.

== Recording and composition ==
"Only Happy When It Rains" was written and recorded between March 1994 and May 1995. It was written in sessions with band members Duke Erikson, Shirley Manson, Steve Marker and Butch Vig in Marker's basement recording studio, and recorded at Smart Studios in Madison, Wisconsin. Bass guitar was played by Mike Kashou, and additional percussion by Pauli Ryan. In the latter stages of the album's recording, Garbage mixed this song twice before it was mastered. At the last minute, Vig made the guitar tracks louder; he later claimed it still did not sound the way he heard it in his head. The mix was noted for Manson's voice being at the same volume as the instruments; in mainstream pop, the lead vocal is usually louder than the instruments.

"Only Happy When It Rains"
The opening for "Only Happy When It Rains", showcasing the bleak lyrics.

Lyrically, Manson described "Only Happy When It Rains" as "about wanting love but knowing life will always get in the way... yet not being obliterated by that. It's a song for people that know what it is like to live on the dark side of life. It's about devotion but a different kind—a devotion to the truth and to freedom... and to hell with the consequences." The song is in the key of G♯ minor, the time signature of 4/4, and at a tempo of 120 beats per minute. Its chord progressions are G♯m–F♯–E–C♯m–E–F♯ in the verses and C♯-F♯-A-B in the chorus.

Marker explained the song's bleak lyrics as a mockery of the angsty "wearing your heart on your sleeve thing" prevalent in mid-1990s alternative rock songs, as well as a self-deprecating reference to Garbage's own dark lyrics. Manson explained that the song was "a dig at ourselves because we like records that don't make us feel very happy, and at this so-called 'alternative' scene of 'we're so weird and more wonderful than everybody else'". Vig added that "'Only Happy When It Rains' was "about what happened with grunge and the angst-filled thing which has dominated the American alternative rock scene... With us there's self-deprecation, we have to poke fun at ourselves because we're so incredibly obsessive about the songs and the lyrics, which makes us filled with self-loathing, hurhur." Garbage said they referenced both the title of The Jesus and Mary Chain song "Happy When It Rains" (1987) and Manson's own Scottish psyche.

When "Only Happy When It Rains" was remastered in 2007 for Garbage's greatest hits album Absolute Garbage, it had to be reverse engineered from a damaged backup DAT as the analog masters for the debut album had been lost. This resulted in some discernible differences in the remaster. The original master tapes were found a few years later.

In 2015, an early demo mix of "Only Happy When It Rains" was included as a previously unreleased bonus track on Garbage (20th Anniversary Super Deluxe Edition).

== Release ==
Initially, Mushroom Records had scheduled "Queer" to be the lead single for the UK release of the debut album Garbage, matching the single release strategy internationally. At last minute, it was decided to release "Only Happy When It Rains" as a single ahead of the album, with "Queer" rescheduled to later in 1995. "Only Happy When It Rains" was quickly picked up by radio, and was C-listed by Radio One, and reached number 47 on the airplay chart. Mushroom issued the single on a limited-edition 7-inch vinyl, CD and cassette on September 18, 1995. All formats were backed with two new tracks recorded specifically for the single: "Girl Don't Come" and "Sleep".

Continuing their theme of collectible 7-inch vinyl releases, which had seen "Vow" packaged in an aluminum sleeve and "Subhuman" in black rubber, Mushroom packaged the 7-inch format for "Only Happy When It Rains" in a "Prismaboard" (rain-effect) die-cut card sleeve, with a hologram logo sticker on the inner jacket. The B-side of the vinyl was pressed with a double-groove, so that either "Girl Don't Come" or "Sleep" played depending on where the stylus landed; the songs were shorter on the vinyl than they were on the CD or cassette formats to accommodate both on one side of the disc. This pressing was limited to 5,000 copies. The original design for the vinyl was for the sleeve to be made from wood, or corrugated cardboard, with wing-nuts in each corner like a flower-press. The nuts were meant to be unscrewed to find the vinyl disc inside - between ten layers of different types of cardboard.

== Reception ==
Upon both the release of Garbage and of 'Only Happy When It Rains' as a single, the song received a positive reception from music journalists. Larry Flick from Billboard described it as "solid all the way through", praising the overall production. Steve Baltin from Cash Box named it Pick of the Week, adding, "When Shirley Manson requests "pour your misery down on me", it's hard to say no. Rarely has sadism sounded as inviting as it does on Garbage's high-energy, poppy masochistic anthem." He noted Manson's "alluring vocals" and stated that "giving the song its cool rock star vibe is the strong guitar solo in the middle. A winning song, 'Only Happy When It Rains' validates the accolades being heaped upon the group." Caroline Sullivan of The Guardian described it as "perversely pretty". Patrick Brennan of Hot Press declared it his Single of the Fortnight, writing, "It's hugely refreshing to come across a song which celebrates all those sad moments of loneliness that can be so life affirming". Another Hot Press editor, Jackie Hinden felt that 'Only Happy When It Rains' was "like a Pretenders for the nineties".

A reviewer for Kerrang! wrote, "A truly inspired single... Garbage combine a slightly sinister acidic approach with an infectious melodic atmosphere and an alternative punch. The result is awesome". Alastair Mabbot, writing for The List, described the song as "Spitting Image's notion of alternative rock". A reviewer for Music Week stated that "Shirley Manson's vocals veer between fuzzy darkness, grinding catchy and crystal brilliance." The magazine's Leo Finlay compared the song to Mazzy Star, and that it "employs the current hip status of country music to devastating effect". Music & Media wrote that tunes like 'Only Happy When It Rains' "could, and maybe should, be hits." In reviews for the debut album, Robert Yates of Q wrote that there was "a nice self-deflating Morrissey touch to [the song]". Spin's Eric Weissard said the song was the only one he hated in Garbage's debut album, but reacted positively to the intro where "backward guitars produce a chiming solo."

At the end of 1995, Melody Maker rated 'Only Happy When It Rains' the 49th best Song of the Year, writing up: "In a year of sunny Britpop, reservoir supplies of ironic bubblegum pop-noir were dangerously low. This burst of mocking miserablism helped". The track has been described as Garbage's signature song, and in 2000 was ranked as 69th in a list of 100 Greatest Pop Songs Of All Time jointly compiled by Rolling Stone and MTV.

== Commercial performance ==
After its first week on-sale, "Only Happy When It Rains" debuted and peaked on the UK Singles Chart at number 29. At the end of the month, Garbage made their debut live appearance to perform the single on Top of the Pops, providing momentum for the album Garbage to debut on the UK Albums Chart at number 12.

In the United States, after multiple stations began playlisting "Only Happy When It Rains" from mid-December 1995, Almo Sounds officially serviced the track to alternative radio at the start of January 1996. By the end of its first week, "Only Happy" had been added by thirty-five stations, in addition to the nine who jumped the release date. The track gained another eighteen stations the following week, and increased its playcount by almost 500 plays and a week later debuted on the Billboard Modern Rock chart. On February 20, Almo Sounds issued a commercial single for "Only Happy" in two formats, CD maxi and cassette single, backed with "Girl Don't Come" and "Sleep" as b-sides. On March 26, Almo serviced a new single remix of "Only Happy When It Rains" (which muted the synths) to Top 40 radio. Thirteen stations initially playlisted the single remix, rising to fifty by the end of the following month. Almo's marketing partner, Geffen, was at this point committed to working "Only Happy When It Rains" up to be a sizable hit. Garbage made their US TV debut performing "Only Happy When It Rains" on Saturday Night Special on April 27 as the song peaked at number 54 on the Hot 100 Airplay chart. In mid-May, "Only Happy When It Rains" peaked at number 16 on the alternative charts and at number 55 on the Hot 100, eventually spending twenty weeks on the chart. Garbage rounded out the promotional work for the track by performing "Only Happy When It Rains" at the 1996 MTV Movie Awards on June 8.

In Australia and New Zealand, Garbage's Australasian record label, White, released "Only Happy When It Rains" on May 27, 1996 as the follow-up to "Stupid Girl". The single was issued on CD single and cassette, backed with "Driving Lesson" and a house remix of album track "Dog New Tricks", both of which had been recorded by the band earlier in the year. On June 16, 1996, "Only Happy When It Rains" debuted on the ARIA singles chart and spent nine weeks in the top 100, peaking at number 80. A month later, the song debuted at number 42 on the New Zealand singles chart, peaking the following week at 38th.

Across Europe, Mushroom Records international distributor BMG released "Only Happy When It Rains" in two formats, a two-track card sleeve CD single with "Dog New Tricks", or a four-track maxi single with "Dog New Tricks", a remix of "Stupid Girl" by Red Snapper and a remix of "Queer" by Danny Saber. Following the band's performance at the Lowlands Festival, the single was a success in the Netherlands, peaking at number 34 on the Dutch Top 40 and number 36 on the Single Top 100. "Only Happy When It Rains" began to be playlisted by a number of radio stations across the continent, eventually reaching number eight on the European alternative rock chart by September 1996.

== Music video ==
The music video for "Only Happy When It Rains" was filmed in mid-January 1996 in Los Angeles by American director Samuel Bayer, simultaneously with the video for single "Stupid Girl". As Almo Sounds thought "Only Happy When It Rains" would be more successful, the video was given a higher budget than the video for "Stupid Girl". The music video debuted in the United States on February 12, where MTV playlisted it immediately as a "Buzz clip", thus guaranteeing it heavy rotation.

The video begins with a short prologue sequence in which several children dressed in animal costumes play in an overcast field, before cutting to Garbage as the song begins. Garbage are located in a litter-strewn warehouse, where the male band members destroy vinyl records, videotape and musical instruments as Manson performs to the camera. Some sequences feature Manson performing the song while on her own in dilapidated toilet stalls. The video ends with inter-cut footage of Manson joining the children on the field.

The "Only Happy When It Rains" video was first commercially released – along with out-take footage shot while filming – on VHS and Video-CD on 1996's Garbage Video. A remastered version of the video was later included on Garbage's 2007 greatest hits DVD Absolute Garbage and made available as a digital download via online music services the same year. The "Only Happy When It Rains" video was uploaded to VEVO in 2013.

== Remixes and samples ==
=== Covers ===
As one of Garbage's signature songs, "Only Happy When It Rains" has been covered by a number of artists over the years. In 2000, comedic musician Richard Cheese performed a lounge arrangement of the song on his album Lounge Against the Machine. In 2006, The Pretenders played the song with Shirley Manson at VH1 Decades Rock Live!. In 2007, Metallica covered the song during an acoustic performance at Neil Young's Bridge School Benefit show. In 2010, The I.M.F.s (Bernard Fowler, Stevie Salas, T. M. Stevens and Dave Abbruzzese) played a funk/soul version of the song at Rockpalast. Actress Katerina Graham recorded a pop rock cover for use in The Vampire Diaries' second season episode "The Sacrifice". In 2017, New Years Day and Lzzy Hale from Halestorm covered the song at Alternative Press Music Awards. New Years Day later included a studio version of the cover featuring Hale on their 2018 EP Diary of a Creep.

In 2009, "Only Happy When It Rains" was featured as a playable song in the videogame Guitar Hero 5. By playing the song in "Career Mode", a virtual avatar of Shirley Manson could be unlocked for use elsewhere within the game.

=== Media ===
"Only Happy When It Rains" appeared in the Homicide: Life On The Street episode "White Lies" and in a 1999 episode of The X-Files entitled "Terms of Endearment". The song was going to appear in the 1997 movie Nightwatch (along with "Supervixen"), but they got replaced by different songs in the final cut. "Only Happy When It Rains" also appeared in the 2019 movie Captain Marvel. In 2021, it appeared in season 1 of the show Cruel Summer. The song appeared as a theme song in the Legally Blonde television series Elle.

== Track listings ==
- UK 7-inch single
1. "Only Happy When It Rains" – 3:58
2. "Girl Don't Come" – 2:03
3. "Sleep" – 1:41
- UK CD and cassette single
1. "Only Happy When It Rains" – 3:58
2. "Girl Don't Come" – 2:33
3. "Sleep" – 2:11
- US CD and cassette
1. "Only Happy When It Rains" - 3:58
2. "Girl Don't Come" - 2:33
3. "Sleep" - 2:11
- Australian CD and cassette single
1. "Only Happy When It Rains" - 3:58
2. "Driving Lesson" - 3:47
3. "Dog New Tricks" (The Pal Mix) - 4:05
- European CD maxi
1. "Only Happy When It Rains" - 3:58
2. "Dog New Tricks" (The Pal mix) - 4:03
3. "Stupid Girl" (Red Snapper mix) - 7:37
4. "Queer" (Danny Saber mix) - 5:40
- European CD single
1. "Only Happy When It Rains" - 3:58
2. "Dog New Tricks" (The Pal mix) - 4:03

== Personnel ==
Garbage

- Shirley Manson – vocals, guitar
- Steve Marker – guitars, bass, samples and loops
- Duke Erikson – guitars, keyboards, six-string and fuzz bass
- Butch Vig – drums, loops, noise and efx

Additional musicians

- Mike Kashou - bass
- Pauli Ryan - additional percussion

Production

- Recorded & produced by Garbage
- Recorded at Smart Studios in Madison, Wisconsin, USA
- Second engineer: Mike Zirkel
- Mastered: Howie Weinberg (Masterdisk)
- Editing & post production: Scott Hull (Masterdisk)

== Charts ==
Chart (1995–1996)	Peak position
Australia (ARIA)	80
Canada Top Singles (RPM)	79
Canada Rock/Alternative (RPM)	11
Iceland (Íslenski Listinn Topp 40)	6
Netherlands (Dutch Top 40)	34
Netherlands (Single Top 100)	36
New Zealand (Recorded Music NZ)	38
Scottish Singles Sales (Official Charts)	27
UK Singles (Official Charts)	29
UK Rock & Metal (Official Charts)	2
US Billboard Hot 100	55
US Cash Box Top 100	44
US Alternative Airplay (Billboard)	16

== Certifications ==
Region	Certification	Certified units/sales
New Zealand (RMNZ)	Gold	15,000^{‡}
^{‡} Sales+streaming figures based on certification alone.

== Release history ==
Region	Date	Format	Label
United Kingdom	September 18, 1995	CD single; 7-inch single; cassette single	Mushroom
United States	January 20, 1996	Modern rock radio	Almo Sounds
United States	February 20, 1996	CD single; cassette single	Almo Sounds
United States	March 26, 1996	Contemporary hit radio	Almo Sounds
Australia	May 27, 1996	CD single; cassette single	White Label
Europe	May 27, 1996	CD single; CD maxi single	BMG
