= Supervixen =

1996 song by alternative rock band Garbage

Promotional single by Garbage

from the album Garbage
- Released: October 15, 1996
- Recorded: 1994–1995
- Studio: Smart Studios (Madison)
- Genre: Alternative rock
- Length: 3:56
- Label: Almo
- Songwriter: Garbage
- Producer: Garbage

"Supervixen" is a song by American rock band Garbage from their debut studio album, Garbage (1995). It was released by Almo as a promotional single in October 1996, receiving airplay on alternative radio. The song takes its title from the 1975 film Supervixens. Musically, "Supervixen" is an alternative rock song built around pitch-shifted guitars and repeated silences, while lead singer Shirley Manson wrote lyrics about idolisation and worship.

While the song did not have any major commercial impact, "Supervixen" was reviewed positively by critics, many of whom deemed it a highlight of its parent album. An early demo of the song was released in 2015 as part of Garbage's 20th anniversary reissue.

== Writing ==
Shirley Manson recording her vocals for "Supervixen" at Smart Studios in Madison, Wisconsin, 1994

"Supervixen" was written by Garbage in 1994 during sessions between band members Butch Vig, Duke Erikson, Shirley Manson and Steve Marker at Smart Studios in Madison, Wisconsin. Madison session musician Mike Kashou performed bass guitar on "Supervixen". Manson felt that "Supervixen" was the hardest of all the debut set's songs to get right: "The lyrics of that song must’ve changed about 5 million times," adding that the track originally began as an ode to Chris Cornell. "Then it turned into a song about obsession and worship. Lyrically, it went through a lot of changes and melodies — this, that and the next thing."

Manson fought with the rest of the band over a rap-lite vocal she had ad-libbed in the recording booth ("Now I want it too much, now I wanted to stop, now I'm lucky like a falling star fell over me") that she was particularly fond of. She won out, and the part was looped as a backing vocal towards the end of the song. Another part ("yeah, you worry too much, now it's got to be stopped") did not.

== Composition ==
"Supervixen" is an alternative rock song. It takes its title from Russ Meyer's 1975 sexploitation film Supervixens, but was influenced by Pier Paolo Pasolini's art horror film Salò, or the 120 Days of Sodom, which had been playing on a monitor above the soundboard at Smart Studios when the band were working on it. Lyrically, Manson stated that "Supervixen" "is all about saying 'idolise me, I'm going to give you everything you want, but you have to do something in return'. It's a bargaining song about a relationship. I'm not saying "I'm a wee Scottish lass fae Edinburgh and I'm great". It's actually about this supervixen, this Russ Meyer-type woman." Vig and Manson declared that the song's controlling tone is tongue-in-cheek, but Vig made sure to point out that during the live performances Manson's domination "[was] also kind of becoming real every night."

Much of the song is built around repeated silences peppered throughout the instrumental sections. The idea for the silences came when the tracking tape kept slipping during mixing. The band had looped a sustained guitar part consisting of two separate pitch-shifted guitar lines but their tape machine's playback function was faulty - parking instead of synching up both ends of the loop seamlessly. The band liked the way the effect had sounded, even though it originated from an unintentional hardware fault: "Basically it goes to dead air, and in a way it's just silence, but that also becomes a hook", Vig later commented. These effects were utilized by the band throughout the structure of "Supervixen", with some of the sections featuring other elements continuing through the deliberate pauses. To achieve this, the band had to make use of extensive muting to keep the final mix tight. Scott Hull from Masterdisk digitally removed the muted sections during the mastering of "Supervixen" to emphasize the silences.

== Release ==
Prior to its release, "Supervixen" was playlisted and hammered daily by stations in Los Angeles, San Diego, and Seattle. Following the international success of "Stupid Girl", Almo issued "Supervixen" as a promotional recording on October 15, 1996. The song was then added to 45 station playlists and debuted at number 50 on R&R's Alternative Rock chart. However, the song was dropped from stations in the weeks following as it was greatly outperformed by the album's other singles, "Stupid Girl" and "#1 Crush".

In 1997, "Supervixen" was initially licensed to the soundtrack of the horror movie Nightwatch, but after a release delay of 18 months, was replaced with R.E.M.'s "The Wake Up Bomb". In 2015, an early demo mix with alternate chorus lyrics was included as a previously unreleased bonus track on Garbage's 2015 reissue.

== Reception ==
"Supervixen" was well-received by music critics, many of whom deemed it a highlight of Garbage. Hot Press reviewer Jackie Hayden wrote, "The sound drop outs should act as a warning to be on your guard". Though Jamie T. Conway of Ikon was critical of its parent album, Conway described "Supervixen" as Pixies-lite and a "strangely appealing" exception. The Jewish Chronicle wrote, "from the staccato riff that dominates 'Supervixen' the scene is set – Eurythmics meets Patti Smith in some Grungy nightclub where bitchy back-biting is the name of the game." Kerrang!'s Paul Rees described the song as "a whirlpool of clattering synth stabs that break of in shattered shards". Paul Yates of Q said that "Garbage's signature lies in songs like "Supervixen", good pop tunes dealt a rough treatment and brazen vocals". Hunter James of Rolling Stone wrote, "Immediately, as the mangy riffs of "Supervixen" begin to chum through space, Garbage drags you someplace else. As Manson's violet throatiness offers to create "a whole new religion," beats chatter, and delicate acoustic guitar notes and those opening riffs float in and out of the songs gently pounding rhythmic foundations. At times the main riff pauses to halt the music altogether."

Peter Murphy of Hot Press wrote of "Supervixen" in his biography for 2007's Absolute Garbage sleeve notes: "The song used silence in a way I'd never heard before. When the music stopped, it wasn't a pause for effect. There was no residual cymbal swish or reverberation or amp hum. That silence was total. It meant business. It was a sort of black hole implosion into which you feared your soul might be sucked." Reflecting on the production 25 years later, Manson stated in 2020: "These really incredible stops at the beginning of that song... Nowadays that’s so easy to replicate because we’re all recording digitally, but what’s so astounding about "Supervixen" was [that] it was all done on analog. It was quite difficult to do when you couldn’t just flip a button."

== Personnel ==
Credits adapted from the liner notes of Garbage.

Garbage

- Shirley Manson – vocals, guitar
- Steve Marker – guitars, bass, samples, loops
- Duke Erikson – guitars, keyboards, six-string bass, fuzz bass
- Butch Vig – drums, loops, noise, EFX

Additional musicians

- Mike Kashou – bass

Technical

- Garbage – production, recording
- Howie Weinberg – mastering
- Scott Hull – editing, post-production
- Mike Zirkel – second engineer
