= Number 1 Crush =

1997 single by Garbage

"#1 Crush"

Single by Garbage

from the album William Shakespeare's Romeo + Juliet: Music from the Motion Picture
- Released: March 14, 1997
- Recorded: 1994–1995
- Studio: Smart Studios (Madison, Wisconsin)
- Genre: Trip hop; alternative rock
- Length: 4:50
- Label: Mushroom
- Songwriter: Garbage
- Producers: Garbage; Nellee Hooper (remix)

Garbage singles chronology
| "Milk" (1996) | "#1 Crush" (1997) | "Push It" (1998) |

"#1 Crush" is a song by American rock band Garbage, released internationally as a B-side to their debut single "Vow" (1995), and in the United Kingdom on the B-side to their second single "Subhuman" (1995).

In 1996, Nellee Hooper and Marius de Vries remixed "#1 Crush" for the soundtrack to Baz Luhrmann's film Romeo + Juliet. In addition to downplaying the guitars and reworking the percussion and synth elements of the song, Hooper added a distorted vocal sample from Madonna's 1995 single "Bedtime Story". The remix of "#1 Crush" was released in March 1997 and went to number one on the Billboard Modern Rock Tracks chart, where it stayed for four weeks.

== Composition and release ==
"#1 Crush" was written and recorded between March 1994 and May 1995 during sessions between band members Duke Erikson, Shirley Manson, Steve Marker and Butch Vig in either Marker's basement recording studio or at their own Smart Studios in Madison. Manson was concerned that listeners wouldn't realise that the song is about a stalker: "It's about somebody who wasn't quite right. The song however [was] slightly autobiography. Everybody's felt obsessive about something or somebody in their life". "#1 Crush" was slated for inclusion on the band's debut album, Garbage, until Almo Sounds co-founder Jerry Moss called his label manager worried that the song might end up "a suicide note". The band didn't think the song was particularly problematic. Erikson said "the lyrics were a bit over the top". Reflecting on the lyrics, Manson felt, "All real love is a form of obsession. If you love someone more than anything else, that degree of exclusivity requires an abnormal amount of passion and care. And that can be positive," contrasting with the protagonist of "#1 Crush. Butch Vig later described "#1 Crush" as "disturbing".

In August 1995, "#1 Crush" was released on the B-side of Garbage's singles "Vow" (in Europe, South Africa and Australasia) and "Subhuman" (in the United Kingdom). Both "Subhuman" and "#1 Crush" were included as bonus tracks on the Japanese release of Garbage (titled G in Japan).

== Remix release and commercial performance ==
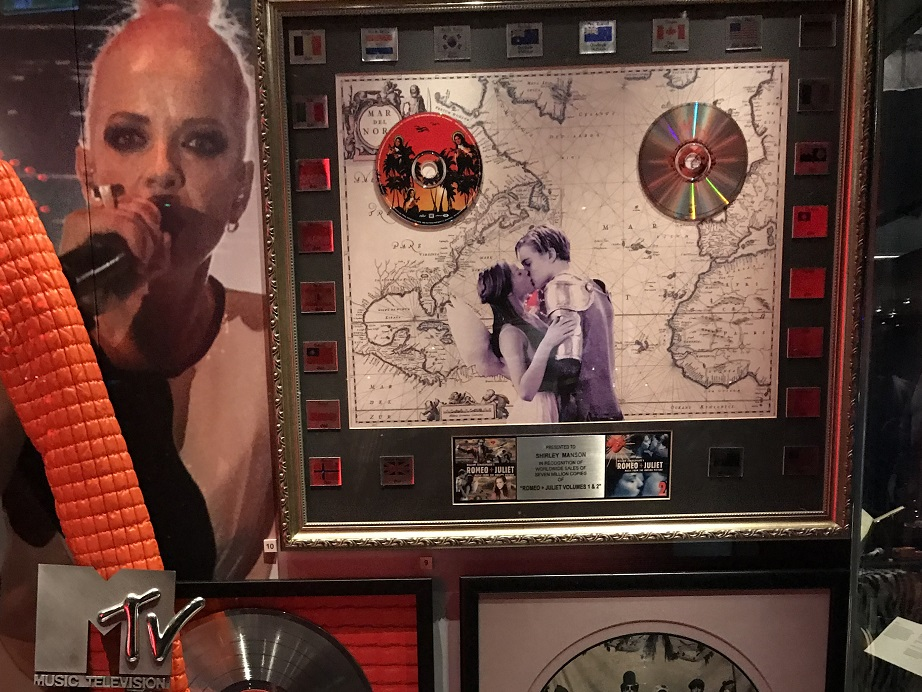
Shirley Manson's platinum plaque certifying seven million worldwide sales for the Romeo + Juliet soundtracks

Early in 1996, Garbage's manager Shannon O'Shea pitched "#1 Crush" to 20th Century Fox for inclusion on the Romeo + Juliet film. The song was received enthusiastically by Fox; however, the band's label Almo Sounds were against it as the soundtrack would be released on another label, Capitol. After months of negotiation, Almo finally agreed. By this time, Garbage had two big hits in the US ("Only Happy When It Rains" and "Stupid Girl") and had broken through into the mainstream. Capitol planned to release the Garbage track first and then follow it up with another artist's song from the film's soundtrack album. Almo were concerned that "#1 Crush" was competing with Garbage's last single releases from their debut album: "Supervixen" had just been released to alternative radio and "Milk" to adult radio formats. Almo had already pressed CDs and cassettes for the physical release of "Milk", and refused to give Capitol single rights. No commercial single for "#1 Crush" could be made available in stores, therefore the song would be ineligible for the Hot 100. Capitol, however, wanted Garbage to shoot a music video for the song.

The soundtrack album for Romeo + Juliet was released in North America on October 29, 1996, three days before the film's release on November 1; "#1 Crush" was placed as the album opener. O'Shea had already given a couple of radio stations early copies of the track on hastily burned CDRs. "#1 Crush" quickly got added to 22 station playlists, even though "Supervixen" was officially the current Garbage single and still increasing in airplay. The following week, "#1 Crush" was the Most Added track at alternative radio, eclipsing "Supervixen" by adding a further 38 stations, while "Supervixen" gained none. The Romeo + Juliet OST debuted at #44 on the Billboard 200. "#1 Crush" debuted at #17 on the Modern Rock Tracks chart and #49 on the Hot 100 Airplay chart; "Supervixen" quickly lost traction as "#1 Crush" soared ahead, gaining more station adds and almost tripling its weekly play total. At this time, Almo was still refusing to support the single and were now focused on servicing "Milk". Don O'Neal, program director of KFRR in Fresno, California, praised Garbage's crossover appeal with the radio success of their previous single "Stupid Girl" as well as the "almost gothic" alternative song "#1 Crush", stating that if they "didn't play that record, top 40 probably wouldn't have."

By December, the soundtrack album had risen to #12; Billboard declared that "#1 Crush" has become "the driving force behind the [Romeo + Juliet OST]" as it broke into the Modern Rock top ten. Due to the song's success, Garbage considered filming a music video for it at the end of their touring commitments. Almo reluctantly agreed to support "#1 Crush" after Geffen executives put pressure on the label. On the first week of January 1997, "#1 Crush" peaked at #29 on the Hot 100 Airplay chart as it hit the #1 spot on the Modern Rock chart. The song would spend the next four weeks at the summit. The Romeo + Juliet soundtrack eventually reached #2 on the albums chart; while Garbage rebounded from the lower-70s into the top 50. By the end of its chart-run, "#1 Crush" had spent a total of 16 weeks on the Hot 100 Airplay chart and twenty-two on the Modern Rock chart. Erikson later recalled: "Turns out we didn't even need a video."

From March through May 1997, Romeo + Juliet opened in theatres throughout Europe. In April, Mushroom serviced "#1 Crush" to European radio, where it placed on Music & Media's Most Added list, and re-released the debut album bundled with a bonus "#1 Crush" CD single.

In 2007, the remix of "#1 Crush" was remastered for Garbage's greatest hits album, Absolute Garbage, and Romeo + Juliet: Music from the Motion Picture (10th Anniversary Edition). In 2012, it was included in the band's second greatest hits album, The Absolute Collection, released in Oceania. In 2015, an early demo mix of "#1 Crush" was included as a previously unreleased bonus track on Garbage (20th Anniversary Super Deluxe Edition), along with new remasters of the original version and the remix. That year, The Absolute Collection was remastered for iTunes, where the "#1 Crush" remix was replaced with the original version. In 2022, the remix was remastered again and included in the band's third greatest hits album Anthology.

== Critical reception and awards ==
"#1 Crush" was nominated for Best Song from a Movie at the 1997 MTV Movie Awards.

== Media appearances ==
In 2004, the original version of "#1 Crush" became the theme tune to the British sci-fi drama Hex. The song was also licensed for episodes of the shows La Femme Nikita and True Blood and is performed by a character in the series Shameless and movie Soldier's Girl. In 2022, the remix was used in episode 7 of the second season of American Horror Stories.

== Personnel ==
Garbage

- Shirley Manson – vocals
- Steve Marker – guitars, bass guitar, samples and loops
- Duke Erikson – guitars, keyboards, six-string and fuzz bass
- Butch Vig – drums, loops, noise and efx

Production

- Recorded & produced by Garbage
- Second engineer: Mike Zirkel
- Mastered: Howie Weinberg (Masterdisk)
- Editing & post production: Scott Hull (Masterdisk)

"#1 Crush (Remix)"

- Remix and additional production: Nellee Hooper
- Additional programming: Marius de Vries
- Mix engineer: Jim Abbiss

== Charts ==
=== Weekly charts ===
| Chart (1997) | Peak position |
|---|---|
| Canada Top Singles (RPM) | 20 |
| Canada Rock/Alternative (RPM) | 1 |
| Iceland (Íslenski Listinn) | 2 |
| US Alternative Airplay (Billboard) | 1 |
| US Pop Airplay (Billboard) | 39 |
| US Radio Songs (Billboard) | 29 |

=== Year-end charts ===
| Chart (1997) | Position |
|---|---|
| Canada Rock/Alternative (RPM) | 17 |
| Iceland (Íslenski Listinn) | 6 |
| US Modern Rock Tracks (Billboard) | 11 |

== See also ==
- List of Billboard number-one alternative singles of 1997
