= Garbage (album) =

Studio album by Garbage
- Released: August 15, 1995
- Recorded: April 1994 – May 1995
- Studios: Smart, Madison, Wisconsin
- Genres: Alternative rock; dance-rock; power pop
- Length: 50:51
- Label: Almo
- Producer: Garbage

Garbage chronology
Garbage (1995)	Version 2.0 (1998)

Singles from Garbage
- 1. "Vow" Released: March 20, 1995; 2. "Only Happy When It Rains" Released: September 18, 1995; 3. "Queer" Released: October 23, 1995; 4. "Stupid Girl" Released: January 22, 1996; 5. "Milk" Released: October 7, 1996

Garbage is the debut studio album by American rock band Garbage, released on August 15, 1995 by Almo Sounds. It was recorded from April 1994 to May 1995, during which the album was overhauled multiple times. The band aimed "to create something that sounded fresh" by experimenting with different styles and genres, and lead singer and songwriter Shirley Manson wrote about darker themes in her lyrics.

The album was promoted with five singles: "Vow", "Only Happy When It Rains", "Queer", "Stupid Girl", and "Milk". All singles entered the UK singles chart—two reaching the top ten—while the first, second and fourth of these entered the US Billboard Hot 100. After the album was completed, Garbage embarked on a year-long tour from November 1995 to December 1996, playing on the European festival circuit and supporting acts like the Smashing Pumpkins.

Garbage earned critical acclaim upon release, receiving three Grammy nominations in 1997 and other accolades. The album peaked at number 20 on the US Billboard 200 and number six on the UK Albums Chart, and charted within the top 20. It garnered multi-platinum certifications in several territories. In the years following its release, Garbage is regarded for its unique production and blend of rock and electronic music.

== Background ==
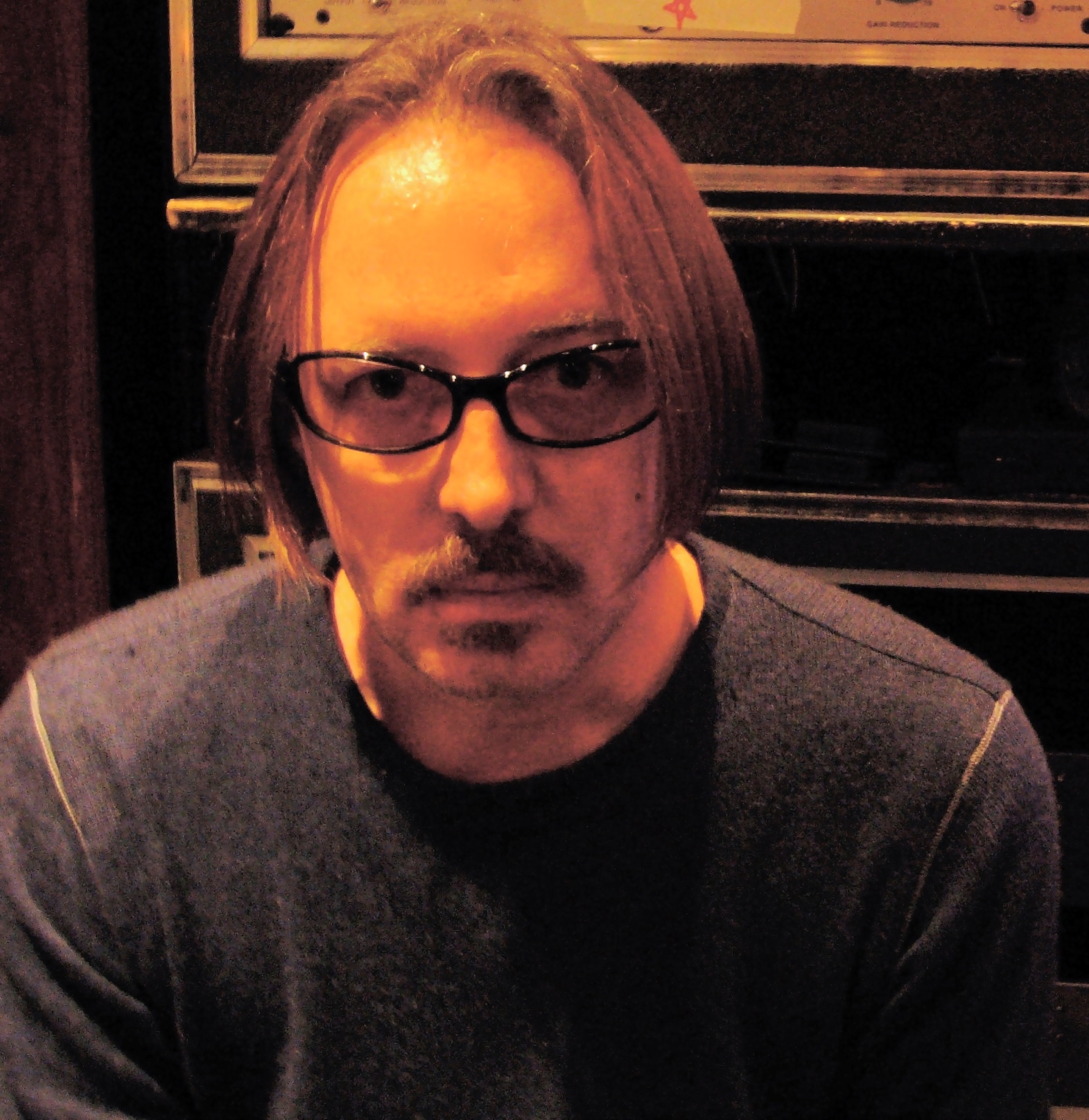
Butch Vig (pictured in 2006) worked as a producer before co-founding Garbage

In 1983, Butch Vig and Steve Marker founded Smart Studios in Madison, Wisconsin, and Vig's production work brought him to the attention of Sub Pop. Vig's old band Spooner reunited in 1990 and released another record, but disbanded in 1993 as Vig's and Marker's careers as producers gained strength.

In 1994, as Vig became "kind of burned out on doing really long records", he got together with Duke Erikson and Marker, and they started producing remixes for acts such as U2, Depeche Mode, Nine Inch Nails and House of Pain, featuring different instrumentation and often highlighting new guitar hooks and bass grooves. The experience inspired the three men to form a band, in which they "wanted to take that remix sensibility and somehow translate it into all of the possibilities of a band setup." An early comment that their work sounded "like garbage" inspired the band's name.

Shirley Manson had been performing with the Edinburgh-based rock band Goodbye Mr Mackenzie since 1984. In 1993, several of the members, including Manson, formed the side project Angelfish. Their only studio album, Angelfish, was as commercially unsuccessful as preceding albums by Goodbye Mr Mackenzie, selling only 10,000 copies.

Initial sessions with Vig on vocals and the members' past work with all-male groups led to the band's desire for a woman on lead. Marker was watching 120 Minutes when he saw the one-time airing of the music video for Angelfish's "Suffocate Me". He showed the video to Erikson and Vig while their manager, Shannon O'Shea, tracked Manson down. When Manson was contacted, she didn't know who Vig was and was urged to check the credits on Nirvana's album Nevermind, which Vig had produced. On April 8, 1994, Manson met Erikson, Marker and Vig for the first time in London. Later that evening Vig was informed of Kurt Cobain's suicide. Garbage was put on hold as Angelfish was touring North America in support of Live. Erikson, Marker and Vig attended the Metro Chicago date, and Manson was invited to Madison to audition for the band. The audition did not go well, but Manson socialized with the men while there and they found they had a similar taste in music. Angelfish disbanded at the end of the Live tour. Manson called O'Shea and asked to audition again, feeling that "it would work out".

== Recording ==
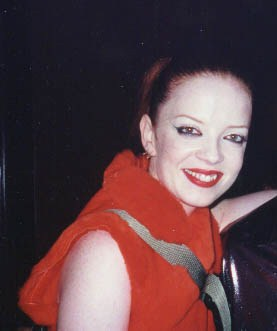
Shirley Manson c. 1998–99

In her return to Smart Studios, Manson began to work on skeletal versions of the songs "Queer", "Vow" and "Stupid Girl". While looking for a record deal for the album, Garbage sent out demo tapes with no bio, to avoid a bidding war over Vig's production history. Garbage signed with Mushroom Records UK worldwide and to Jerry Moss's label Almo Sounds for North America. Manson's contribution was licensed to both Mushroom and Almo by her label Radioactive Records.

"We ended up having 48 tracks of samples and loops, and all sorts of strange processed sound effects and weird guitar overdubs, and then through the mix process we'd add and subtract until we'd get to a point where the song still came across."

— Butch Vig on the creative process

Garbage continued to work on the album throughout the start of 1995, delayed by Vig's work producing Soul Asylum's Let Your Dim Light Shine album and the songs being "piecemealed together in the studio". Vig described the composing process as a "dysfunctional democracy" where someone would bring a loop or a sample, which was followed by jam sessions in which the band members would "find one bar that's kind of cool, load that into our samplers, jam on top of that, [and] Shirley will ad-lib", with the process continuing until the song was finished, often with "all of the original ideas gone, and the song had somehow mutated into something completely different." Given Vig "got bored spending so many years recording really fast, straightforward punk records", the band "didn't want to approach the Garbage record from the angle of a band playing live", making their songs out of samples that would be processed and reworked in a Wall of Sound process "to create something that sounded fresh."

A major part of the work involved Manson rewriting the song lyrics, which Vig said the band attempted to "write from a woman's perspective and I think, initially, some of them were a little pretentious. But as soon as Shirley came on board she simplified the lyrics so that they were a lot more subtle and worked better as songs." Manson detailed that regarding the previous song sketches, "some of the ideas for lyrics I found unsuitable, and others I liked and worked on with them. I always went to bat for what I believed in." She added that because "the lyrics take a while to work on" bandmates would give suggestions and she included the ones that fancied her.

When Garbage began to collate the material for career retrospective Absolute Garbage in 2007, the Garbage analog masters could not be found. Vig and audio engineer Billy Bush were able to track down an archived, but rather incomplete and damaged, set of 16-bit 44.1 kHz safety DAT mixes. Despite the condition of the backups, mastering engineer Emily Lazar at The Lodge in New York City was able to reverse-engineer the missing songs from the damaged archive. Lazar used some alternate versions of the songs when completing the final master. Her assistant, Joe LaPorta, mastered and edited the remixes for the special edition.

== Composition ==
=== Lyrics ===
The lyrics on the record were described by the band members as "a collaborative psycho-therapy session wherein personal demons of various sizes and importance are exorcised, vilified, taken revenge upon and laid to rest." Vig said they tried to deal with "dark themes that I think a lot of people can relate to in some way or another", which included voyeurism, hedonism, perversion, obsession and "the art of self-destruction." Manson stated that even though she put together most of the songs, "everybody has ideas that come to the table and I just use what I fancy. When we're working on something, the lyrics take a while to work on and [they] come to me and say 'I've had these ideas, use them if you want' and if there's something I like, I'll stick it in with my own, or vice-versa. Some people come in going 'I've got this great title for a song' and I might use that."

Manson remarked that while the content was "a lot more poppy" than most of her previous work, the songs invoked the dark side of her nature, as "sometimes I'm a wee bit creepy, and that definitely comes out in the music." She also declared that music "unlocks sensations and feelings that you keep inside, that society doesn't allow you to show", saying that the gist of a mean-spirited song like "Vow" is very real despite "none of us hav[ing] ever really acted on those feelings". Vig added that the band was eager to exploit the contrast between words and music: "The initial idea was to make this a dark lyric with a shiny, happy, pop sensibility. You could be singing this really catchy line and realize the lyrics were totally wacked."

Among the songs that were completely reworked, "As Heaven Is Wide" went from "a big rock track" to a techno-style song with Tom Jones-inspired beats, only keeping Erikson's fuzz bass and Manson's vocals from the original recording. In 2017, Manson revealed during an interview with Yahoo! that the song "Fix Me Now" was originally titled "Chris Cornell", because she was obsessed with the lead singer of Soundgarden. A demo version of the song features Manson singing Cornell's name.

=== Music ===
Garbage has a sound that "tr[ied] to incorporate different styles and genres, throw it all into a big melting pot and see what would happen", according to Vig. Vig explained that as in his opinion "the most exciting bands are those who incorporate all those elements of punk, funk, techno, hip hop, etc." Garbage would attempt to do the same and "take those influences and make them work in the context of a pop song." The band went overboard with experimentation, with Erikson adding that throughout they liked to include "sounds that we found accidentally, like Steve's sample of a tape deck backing up, or the bit in 'Stupid Girl' that was initially a mistake, but when we slowed it down, actually fit the timbre and pace of the song and became the hook."

Stephen Thomas Erlewine of AllMusic stated that the album "has all the trappings of alternative rock—off-kilter arrangements, occasional bursts of noise, a female singer with a thin, airy voice, but it comes off as pop" because of Vig's "glossy production". Erlewine characterized the sound of the record as "slick and professional", full of "well-crafted pop songs", including "trashy alternative pop gems" like "Queer" and "Vow". The A.V. Club's Stephen Thompson described the album as "a prototypically '90s record full of pumped-up, electronically enhanced, sample-laden pop-rock songs." Newsweek remarked that the album "has an impressive swirl of acoustic and electric guitars, keyboards and swanky pop hooks that actually push alternative rock in a new direction." About.com's Tim Grierson stated that the album "was steeped in alt-rock, but hits like 'Only Happy It Rains' had a dance element to them that distinguished the band from many of their angst-rock peers." Grierson further categorized the album as "dance-rock" and "techno-rock".

Gil Kaufman of Addicted to Noise described the album as a "surprisingly non-guitar rock mix of ambient noise, shifting trip-hop beats, grinding jungle rhythms and an ocean-size chunk of buzzing noise that, somehow, gels and rises above the din thanks to catchy hooks and killer song construction." Metro Weekly characterized the album as "a heavy mix of electronic pop and guitar rock with samples, electronica and trip-hop beats thrown into the mix." Billboard noted that "acting on the premise that more is more, foursome Garbage thrashes out power pop with enough skill and passion to rate among the cream of the alternative crop. First single 'Queer' is a modern rock success, and other cuts—especially 'Only Happy When It Rains', 'Stupid Girl', and 'Supervixen'—are capable of keeping interests high. Proof that success can come from the oddest combinations."

== Promotion and release ==
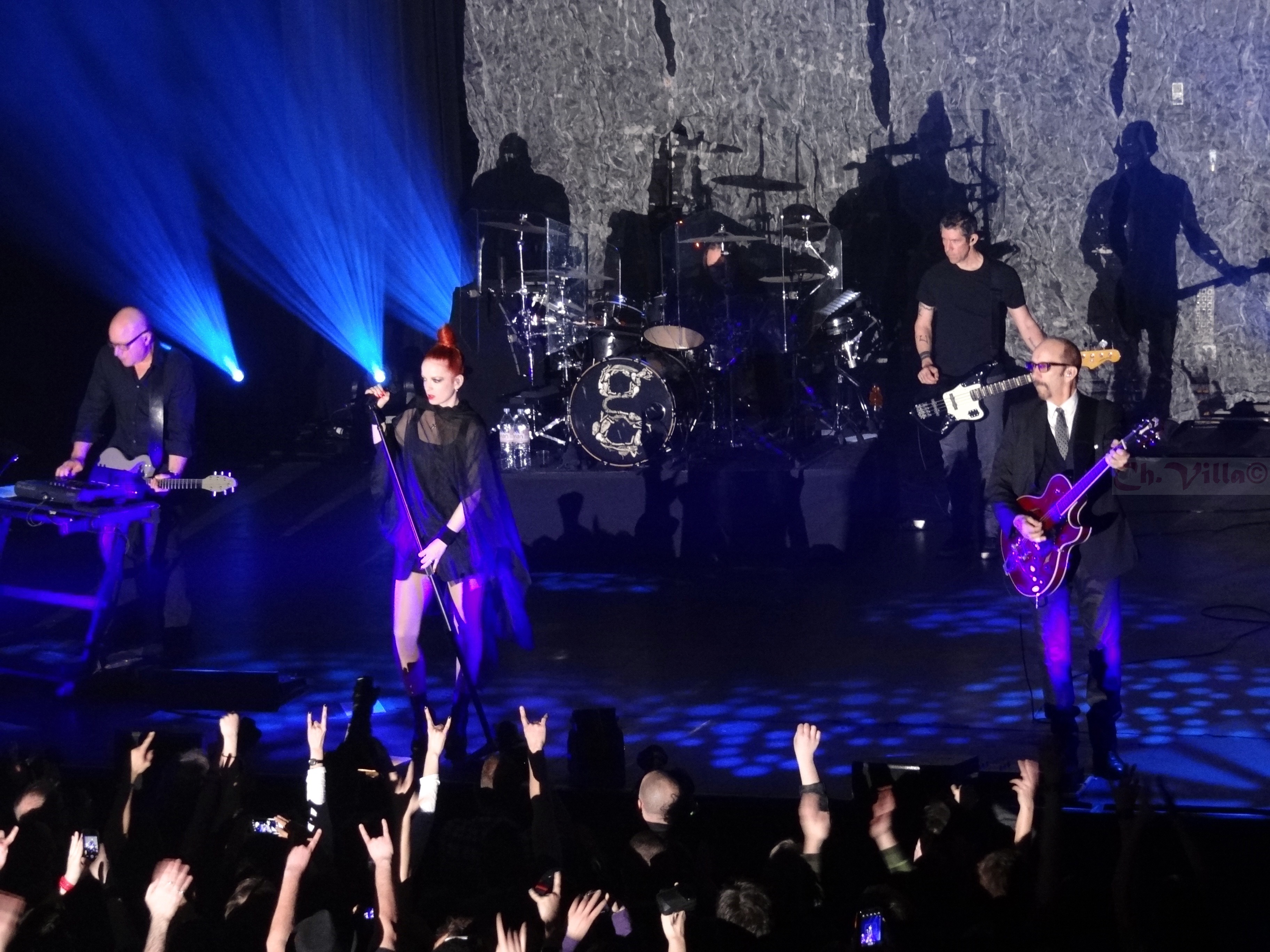
Garbage performing in 2013

Vig stated that the band had no initial plans to tour as "not going on the road would really free us up to record tons of stuff". As the band members realized "that if we were going to have a successful record we'd have to go out on tour and promote it", and enjoyed playing live to record the "Vow" video, they decided to perform to audiences as well. To perform the complex and layered tracks live, the band hired Los Angeles bass player Daniel Shulman for the tour, and figured out ways to trigger samples on stage, such as having Marker play a keyboard along with his guitar.

On February 24, 1996, Garbage set off on a 17-date headline tour of North America. Garbage then supported Smashing Pumpkins on their North American arena tour from June 25, although the tour was cut short after the death of Smashing Pumpkins keyboardist Jonathan Melvoin on July 12. Garbage returned to Europe on August 3 promoting Garbage with a month of shows around the festival circuit.

Garbage was released on October 2, 1995, in the United Kingdom. The band then headed south to Asia and Australia to promote the album, beginning with shows in Singapore on September 28 and ending in Osaka, Japan, on October 18. Garbage returned to the US to give Garbage a final push by rejoining the Smashing Pumpkins' rescheduled tour, beginning on October 23.

In October 2015, Garbage was reissued to mark its 20th anniversary, featuring remastered tracks from the original analog tapes, as well as remixes and previously unreleased alternate versions of songs from the album.

== Reception ==
=== Critical ===
Professional ratings
Review scores
Source	Rating
AllMusic	5/5 stars
Entertainment Weekly	A
The Guardian	4/5 stars
Kerrang!	5/5
NME	8/10
Q	4/5 stars
Rolling Stone	4/5 stars
Select	4/5
Spin	7/10
Vox	8/10

Garbage was acclaimed by contemporary critics. In Entertainment Weekly, Steven Mirkin said the band's songwriting was just as exceptional as Vig's guitar and drum sounds, highlighting the "menacing sexuality, sonic playfulness, inventive guitar treatments, and cool vocals by Shirley Manson". Gil Kaufman from Addicted to Noise found the record's sound "akin to a Jackson Pollock painting, thick layers upon layers of sound that have been stripped down, torn apart, pasted together and then stripped again, until the result is a dizzying soundscape that reveals fresh nuances upon repeated listening". He added that the music's mix of ambience, rhythms, and noise "gels and rises above the din thanks to catchy hooks and killer song construction." Sharon O'Connell of Melody Maker hailed it as the closest to "perfection as a pop/rock record" as can be, while Emma Morgan of NME called it "a reminder of how sweet angst can be in the hands of talented players".

Keith Harris wrote in The Rolling Stone Album Guide that the record's electronic guitar hooks and Manson's "pop-star-as-one-night-stand" persona were seductive but had a "tawdry disposability". On the other hand, writing in The Michigan Daily, Heather Phares was very mixed. Although she was favourable of the singles "Vow" and "Queer", the latter of which had "a sinister sex appeal that redeems it somewhat from the cheesiness of the rest of the album." She felt that the band mostly sound "angsty and jaded for no good reason," and concluded that while it's not "total junk, it's no prize either."

Garbage was voted the 19th best album of 1995 in the Pazz & Jop, an annual poll of American critics published by The Village Voice. The newspaper's Robert Christgau gave the album a three-star honorable mention. He named "Queer" and "Supervixen" as its highlights while writing "if Whale is Tricky without a dark side, Garbage is Whale without Tricky and depressed about it". At the 39th Annual Grammy Awards in 1997, Garbage was nominated for Best Rock Song and Best Rock Performance by a Duo or Group, while the band was nominated for Best New Artist.

=== Commercial ===
Garbage debuted at number 29 on the Top Heatseekers chart dated September 2, 1995, before peaking at number two on March 9, 1996. In the issue dated September 30, 1995, the album entered the Billboard 200 at number 193, and reached its peak position of number 20 on August 10, 1996. The album was certified double platinum by the Recording Industry Association of America (RIAA) on February 24, 1999, and by August 2008, it had sold 2.4 million copies in the United States. In Canada, the album reached number 15 on The Record's chart and number 25 on RPM's chart, was certified double platinum by Canadian Recording Industry Association (CRIA), denoting shipments in excess of 200,000 units.

Garbage debuted at number 12 on the UK Albums Chart with 9,409 copies sold in its first week, eventually peaking at number six in April 1996. The album was certified double platinum by the British Phonographic Industry (BPI) on October 16, 1998, and had sold 701,757 copies in the United Kingdom as of May 2012. The album saw modest success across continental Europe, reaching number 16 in France, number 19 in Sweden, number 23 in Finland, number 30 in Norway and number 55 in Germany. In Oceania, it charted at number four in Australia and number one in New Zealand, earning double platinum certifications in both countries. As of August 2015, Garbage had sold over four million copies worldwide.

== Legacy ==
Sound on Sound journalist Sam Inglis argued in 2002 that the musical techniques used on Garbage were radical at the time and influenced subsequent popular music, "uniting distorted guitars and cool female vocals with production that owed as much to Public Enemy as Led Zeppelin". In a 2012 article, Jancee Dunn opined Garbage always sounded "very forward-thinking, intelligent" and current, even when heard more than a decade later. Los Angeles Times critic Mikael Wood said in 2012 that Garbage's techno-minded sound and Manson's alluring persona complemented and countered the contemporary post-grunge music Vig had helped pioneer after producing Nirvana's 1991 album Nevermind. Jon O'Brien of the National Academy of Recording Arts & Sciences observed in 2025 that Garbage redefined rock of the 1990s, bringing "a new kind of energy to the genre that's remained influential" through the introduction of Manson, the career reinvention of Vig, and its promotional videos.

Garbage was named the 71st greatest album of all time by The Guardian in 1997, which polled a number of renowned critics, artists, and radio DJs worldwide. It was later included in the 2010 edition of 1001 Albums You Must Hear Before You Die. In 2022, it was included on Pitchfork's list of the 150 best albums of the 1990s, who said Garbage was "definitely Shirley Manson's band" and the album "had layers of sharp production, but still felt raw thanks to Manson’s sneer and biting lyrics."

== Track listing ==
All tracks are written by Garbage, except where noted.

Garbage track listing
No.	Title	Length
1.	"Supervixen"	3:55
2.	"Queer"	4:36
3.	"Only Happy When It Rains"	3:56
4.	"As Heaven Is Wide"	4:44
5.	"Not My Idea"	3:41
6.	"A Stroke of Luck"	4:44
7.	"Vow"	4:30
8.	"Stupid Girl" (Garbage, Joe Strummer, Mick Jones)	4:18
9.	"Dog New Tricks"	3:56
10.	"My Lover's Box"	3:55
11.	"Fix Me Now"	4:43
12.	"Milk"	3:53
Total length:		50:51

Notes

- "Queer" contains a loop from "Man of Straw" by Single Gun Theory.
- "Not My Idea" contains a loop from Headless Chickens.
- "Stupid Girl" contains a loop from "Train in Vain" by The Clash.
- Releases in Japan include the bonus tracks "Subhuman" and "#1 Crush".
- Garbage was reissued for its 20th anniversary in 2015 with nine extra tracks, including a remix of "#1 Crush" by Nellee Hooper.

== Personnel ==
Credits adapted from the liner notes of Garbage.

Garbage

- Shirley Manson – vocals, guitar
- Steve Marker – guitars, bass, samples, loops
- Duke Erikson – guitars, keyboards, six-string bass, fuzz bass
- Butch Vig – drums, loops, noise, EFX

Additional musicians

- Mike Kashou – bass (tracks 1–3, 5, 8, 12); fuzz bass (track 4)
- Clyde Stubblefield – additional drums (tracks 2, 5)
- Les Thimmig – clarinet (track 2)
- Pauli Ryan – percussion (tracks 3, 5, 8, 10)
- David Frangioni – additional loops
- Rich Mendelson – additional loops

Technical

- Garbage – production, recording
- Howie Weinberg – mastering
- Scott Hull – editing, post-production
- Mike Zirkel – second engineer

Artwork

- Robin Sloane – creative direction
- Janet Wolsborn – art direction
- Garbage – art direction
- Adrian Britteon – logo
- Stéphane Sednaoui – photos
- Clifford LeCuyer – additional photos
- Photo 24 – additional photos

== Charts ==
=== Weekly charts ===
Weekly chart performance for Garbage
Chart (1995–1998)	Peak position
Australian Albums (ARIA)	4
Belgian Albums (Ultratop Flanders)	34
Belgian Albums (Ultratop Wallonia)	20
Canada Top Albums/CDs (RPM)	25
Canadian Albums (The Record)	15
Danish Albums (Hitlisten)	10
Dutch Albums (Album Top 100)	33
European Albums (Music & Media)	15
Finnish Albums (Suomen virallinen lista)	23
French Albums (SNEP)	16
German Albums (Offizielle Top 100)	55
Greek Albums (IFPI)	14
Icelandic Albums (Tónlist)	20
New Zealand Albums (RMNZ)	1
Norwegian Albums (VG-lista)	30
Portuguese Albums (AFP)	17
Scottish Albums (Official Charts)	6
Swedish Albums (Sverigetopplistan)	19
UK Albums (Official Charts)	6
UK Independent Albums (Official Charts)	5
UK Rock & Metal Albums (Official Charts)	1
US Billboard 200	20

Weekly chart performance for the re-release of Garbage
Chart (2015)	Peak position
Scottish Albums (Official Charts)	93
UK Albums (Official Charts)	126
UK Independent Albums (Official Charts)	20
US Top Catalog Albums (Billboard)	41
US Indie Store Album Sales (Billboard)	6

=== Year-end charts ===
Year-end chart performance for Garbage
Chart (1996)	Position
Australian Albums (ARIA)	27
European Albums (Music & Media)	68
French Albums (SNEP)	45
New Zealand Albums (RMNZ)	8
UK Albums (OCC)	25
US Billboard 200	52

== Certifications ==
Certifications and sales for Garbage
Region	Certification	Certified units/sales
Australia (ARIA)	2× Platinum	140,000^{^}
Belgium (BRMA)	Gold	25,000^{*}
Canada (Music Canada)	2× Platinum	200,000^{^}
Denmark (IFPI Danmark)	Gold	25,000^{^}
France (SNEP)	Gold	100,000^{*}
Germany	—	230,000
Ireland (IRMA)	Gold	7,500^{^}
New Zealand (RMNZ)	2× Platinum	30,000^{^}
Portugal (AFP)	Gold	20,000^{^}
Singapore (RIAS)	Gold	7,000
United Kingdom (BPI)	2× Platinum	701,757
United States (RIAA)	2× Platinum	2,400,000
Summaries
Worldwide	—	4,000,000
^{*} Sales figures based on certification alone.^{^} Shipments figures based on certification alone.
