= Subhuman (song) =

1995 single by Garbage

Single by Garbage

from the album Garbage (Japanese Edition)
- B-side: "#1 Crush"; "Vow"
- Released: August 7, 1995
- Recorded: 1994–1995
- Studio: Sarm (Madison, Wisconsin)
- Genre: Alternative rock; industrial rock; electronica; grunge
- Length: 4:37
- Label: Mushroom
- Songwriter: Garbage
- Producer: Garbage

Garbage singles chronology
"Vow" (1995)	"Subhuman" (1995)	"Queer" (1995)

Alternative cover
- Limited edition 7-inch vinyl rubber wallet cover.

"Subhuman" is a 1995 song written, recorded and produced by alternative rock band Garbage, and was originally released as an international B-side on "Vow", Garbage's debut single. That song had earlier been pressed as a limited edition 7-inch vinyl in the United Kingdom for the purposes of launching the band; when it came to re-releasing "Vow", Mushroom Records felt that "Subhuman" was strong enough to be issued as an A-side to follow up "Vow". A last-minute decision was made to switch the songs. "Vow" was relegated to a bonus track on the CD single.

"Subhuman" was released as the band's second single exclusively in the United Kingdom, and it gave Garbage their first chart appearance, peaking at #50 on the UK Singles Chart. The single was promoted by a press junket organised by the record label on a boat sailing down London's River Thames, and attracted media attention for the distinctive rubber packaging of the vinyl format.

"Subhuman" was also used by the label as an opportunity to massively raise general awareness of Garbage and as an advertising campaign to brand the "G" logo by promoting the single release with plain white flyers, stickers, carrier bags, T-shirts and subway posters emblazoned with the band's "G" logo. "Subhuman" was never intended to be an album cut, and was not included on the standard editions of the band's debut album, Garbage, which was released later that year. The single was excluded from the 2007 greatest hits album Absolute Garbage and from the 2012 greatest hits album The Absolute Collection. It was, however, remastered and included in the CD and streaming editions of the 2022 greatest hits album Anthology.

== Background ==
"Subhuman" was written and recorded over the course of 1994 during sessions between band members Duke Erikson, Shirley Manson, Steve Marker and Butch Vig in either Marker's basement recording studio or at Smart Studios in the Wisconsin university town of Madison. The band has kept the story behind the song ambiguous, although Erikson has said that the lyric "burn down all your idols", the first line of the song "pretty much sums it up". The opening noise emerged from Vig accidentally wiring the mixing console to the air conditioner.

== First single ==
Midway through the recording sessions for the band's debut album, the band's manager, Shannon O'Shea, secured the group an inclusion on Volume, a compilation album and magazine title. However, the deadline given for accepting a track was only three days. The only song the band had completed in any shape or form was "Vow". After Volume was released in December 1994, "Vow" began to receive radio airplay from Radio 1 DJs Steve Lamacq, John Peel and Johnnie Walker, and record stores in the United Kingdom began to receive requests for a single that didn't yet exist. Garbage were still putting the finishing touches to their debut set, as well as extra tracks such as "Subhuman", which was still three months away from release. In the United Kingdom, the terms of the licensing deal regarding the inclusion of "Vow" on Volume meant that the track could only be released on a limited basis. "Vow" was issued in a 1,000 copy limited edition 7-inch vinyl format packaged in an aluminium sleeve, which was designed by O'Shea along with the aluminium sleeve for "Vow". The single sold out in one day. Mushroom later licensed the single out to BMG who fully issued "Vow" in Europe, and to White Records, who released "Vow" in Australia and New Zealand in a limited edition format packaged in an embossed rubber wallet. "Subhuman" was released as the "Vow" b-side on both labels.

== "Subhuman" release ==
Mushroom's plan for releasing "Vow" in the limited metal sleeve had been to create an early buzz about the band and "Vow" by word-of-mouth, rather than by retail impact. For the follow-up, the label were concerned with maintaining the interest of the record buyers, as well as attracting interest from record chains. Mushroom manufactured advance discs to promote a re-release of "Vow" in the United Kingdom, but later decided to alter the single, so that the international b-side, "Subhuman", would be the title track. The label felt that "Subhuman" was a "strong single to release in its own right". "Subhuman" was to be a limited release as well, but manufactured in greater quantities to enable a greater retail impact than the first. Mushroom re-serviced the single to the media as a cassette featuring "Subhuman", "#1 Crush" (an album out-take) and "Vow".

Garbage requested that their initial singles were to be packaged with a "high-tech, design-led approach", which led to the manufacture of the aluminium sleeve for "Vow". To follow it up, Mushroom's product manager originally wanted to create the sleeve for "Subhuman" from neoprene. Instead, he sourced a black plasticised rubber from a company in Germany to create the sleeve. Although it wasn't requested, the company manufactured the rubber wallets with lining and a flap to enclose the discs within. "Subhuman" was a bigger investment than the first single; the metal sleeve for "Vow" had cost 90p per unit to manufacture, "Subhuman" cost £2.00 per unit. Knowing that the dealer price was fixed at £1.36, Mushroom lost 64p on each. The company manufactured 3,000 copies of the sleeve in 7-inch size, and a further 2,000 copies in CD-size (these were used as promos, and exported to Australia for their limited edition "Vow" CD single).

"Subhuman" was used to brand the "G" logo within the UK music market.

Marketing trends over the 1990s had shown an increasing dominance of using branding to sell product, so Mushroom's marketing campaign for the launch of the band focused on branding the "G" logo onto the minds of music buyers. The logo would adorn the album cover and each upcoming single, as well as all upcoming promotional matter and point of sale displays. Upfront of the release date, Mushroom ran two teaser campaigns in the British music press. 10,000 A2 posters of simply the G logo were affixed to prime sites around the United Kingdom; another 10,000 were set up two weeks later which also included the band's name, the name of the single and the release information. Similar branded carrier bags and posters were distributed to independent retailers, flyers and stickers distributed to nightclubs, as well as branded t-shirts to key people. No music video was filmed for "Subhuman", instead, Mushroom serviced the video for "Vow" to music channels.

To support the release of "Subhuman" and launch the album, Mushroom organised the band's first fanzine press conference on July 25, on board a cruise sailing up and down the River Thames. The event hosted an exclusive album playback and a question and answer session to introduce the band, and gained music paper publicity for the release of the album. The boat set-off from Embankment Pier early, without the band on board, and had to return to pick them up (it was later pointed out and reported that the conference had taken place on the sister-ship to the Marchioness, which had sunk with loss of life a few years earlier).

On August 7, 1995, "Subhuman" was issued on the rubber-sleeved 7-inch vinyl, and stickered CD single, both limited to 3,000 copies each. Some copies of the vinyl also came with a G-logo carrier bag. Both formats sold out in the first week. "Subhuman" debuted at number 50 on the UK Singles Chart. In case of demand, Mushroom also manufactured an extra 2,000 copies of the 7-inch in a simple black card sleeve. These made it into shops the following week, at the end of which "Subhuman" fell to number 77.

== Post-release ==
Both "Subhuman" and "#1 Crush" were never intended to be included on the band's debut album, which was released in the United Kingdom in October 1995. Both tracks were, however, included as bonus tracks on the Japanese edition of Garbage. In November, "Subhuman" was included on Rare Track Collection, a five track sampler given away free by Virgin Megastores in France with purchases of the album. Towards the end of the following year, "Subhuman" b-side "#1 Crush" was remixed by Nellee Hooper for inclusion on the soundtrack album to Baz Luhrmann's Romeo + Juliet. As the album opener, "#1 Crush" received massive airplay at alternative radio. At the start of 1997, "#1 Crush" hit #1 on the Modern Rock chart and stayed there for four weeks. Later the same year, a limited two-disc edition of Garbage featuring "Subhuman" and three other b-sides was issued in Korea and Singapore. In 1998, "Subhuman" was included on Independent Access, a CD sampler given away by Newbury Comics stores in the United States with purchases of Garbage's second album Version 2.0.

In 2015, Garbage announced the 20th Anniversary Edition of their debut album with a free download of an extended version of "Subhuman" with all pre-orders. "Subhuman" was included on the deluxe edition of the reissue. "I just don't feel that everyone felt ["Subhuman"] was strong enough to put on the record", Shirley Manson stated in 2015. "In retrospect it's a bit silly, because it's fantastic. You make strange choices and you have to live by them".

In 2022, "Subhuman" was remastered by Heba Kadry and included in the band's third greatest hits album Anthology.

== Critical reception ==
"Subhuman" received a mostly positive response from music critics. Before the release of the single, Volume described the song as having a "dark sensibility and bouts of Trent Reznor-esque depression". Both Kerrang! and Melody Maker rated "Subhuman" as their "Single of the Week"; the former publication wrote, ""Subhuman" crunches along on a thrilling, all consuming electro-rhythm-from-hell. Totally distinctive and utterly brilliant" while the latter lengthily enthused, "There are reminders of Curve, in the scowling, abrasive guitars, trussed down with a rubbery, mordantly funky rhythm programme. This is severely internal music, right inside your head, pulsing like a migraine, with Manson crowing like a dominatrix as she presides over some impending psychological breakdown". Hot Press described "Subhuman" as "hypnotic drum loops combined with a guitar overload... an industrial noise-feat", adding that it was "a great single". Vox were equally positive, writing "trashing a bloated, ego-fuelled but nameless icon, "Subhuman" is one of [Garbage's] darkest songs to date." NME were severely critical of "Subhuman", stating that the single was a disappointing follow up to "Vow": "Garbage go and ruin it all by being hopelessly techno-gothic. The end result is a song plagued by its own earnestness... it more or less self-destructs."

== Track listings ==
- UK CD single Mushroom D1138
1. "Subhuman" – 4:36
2. "#1 Crush" – 4:52
3. "Vow" – 4:30

- UK 7-inch vinyl Mushroom S1138 / SX1138
1. "Subhuman" – 4:36
2. "#1 Crush" – 4:52

- Digital download
1. "Subhuman (Supersize mix)" – 5:13

== Credits and personnel ==
Garbage

- Shirley Manson – vocals, guitar
- Steve Marker – guitars, bass, samples and loops
- Duke Erikson – guitars, keyboards, six-string and fuzz bass
- Butch Vig – drums, loops, noise and efx

- Recorded & produced by Garbage
- Recorded at Smart Studios in Madison, Wisconsin, USA
- Second engineer: Mike Zirkel
- Mastered: Howie Weinberg (Masterdisk)
- Editing & post production: Scott Hull (Masterdisk)

== Charts ==
Chart performance for "Subhuman"
Chart (1995)	Peak position
Scotland (Official Charts Company)	45
UK Singles (Official Charts Company)	50
UK Rock & Metal (Official Charts)	2
