= Queer (song) =

1995 single by Garbage

Single by Garbage

from the album Garbage
- B-side: "Trip My Wire"; "Butterfly Collector"
- Released: October 23, 1995
- Recorded: 1994–1995
- Studio: Smart (Madison, Wisconsin)
- Genre: Alternative rock; trip hop; downtempo; alternative pop
- Length: 4:36 (album version); 4:06 (single version)
- Label: Almo
- Songwriter: Garbage
- Producer: Garbage

Garbage singles chronology
"Subhuman" (1995)	"Queer" (1995)	"Only Happy When It Rains" (1995)

Music video
- "Queer" on YouTube

"Queer" is a song by American rock band Garbage from their self-titled debut studio album (1995). The song started as a demo during sessions between band members Butch Vig, Duke Erikson, and Steve Marker, and finished after singer Shirley Manson joined the band. Manson rewrote the sexualized lyrics to be more ambiguous, and rearranged the song into a subdued trip hop and rock crossover composition.

In 1995, "Queer" was released as the band's second international single (fourth in the United Kingdom). The song quickly became a modern rock success for the fledgling band, with positive reviews from music journalists, and was Garbage's first top-20 in both the US Hot Modern Rock Tracks chart and on the UK Singles Chart. "Queer" also earned attention for its music video by Stéphane Sednaoui, which featured Manson detaining, stripping and shaving a man from a first-person perspective. The video clip gained significant airplay on MTV, was credited with presenting Garbage as a new, credible act with strong focus on visuals, and the following year was nominated for Breakthrough Video at the 1996 MTV Video Music Awards.

== Composition ==
"Queer" began as a rough demo around January 1994, recorded during informal studio sessions between Butch Vig, Duke Erikson, and Steve Marker in Marker's home basement recording studio in Madison, Wisconsin. The band had been jamming using an ADAT eight-track, Akai samplers, and a small drum kit. The band had written around five songs that they felt were pretentious and lyrically simple and literal. They did not want Erikson to sing, even though he was a competent singer, because they wanted to avoid sounding like their previous band Spooner. Vig and Marker were uncomfortable with their vocals so tended to bury them deep in the mix or distort them with effects; on "Queer", Vig recorded a "scratch vocal" consisting of him screaming his way through. The recorded work was later discarded, which Vig explained was because the trio discovered that the musical experiments they were attempting "[don't] work when you're trying to write a song and put it in a context that works". Vig's inspiration for "Queer" came from Brotherly Love, a novel by Pete Dexter, "about this woman who was hired to go and make this guy's son a 'man'." The story of the novel, which followed two boys caught up in the Philadelphia mob life, inspired Vig to write from the perspective of the prostitute observing an odd, emotionally scarred boy.

After Marker saw Shirley Manson's group Angelfish on 120 Minutes, the band invited her to Vig and Marker's Smart Studios to sing on a couple of songs. One of the compositions was "Queer", whose incomplete lyrics forced Manson to ad-lib in an audition that was described as "dreadful". The singer afterwards returned to Angelfish, which folded shortly later. Manson eventually returned to Smart for a successful second audition and then began working on the songs Vig, Marker and Erikson had created, which at this point included "Queer", "Vow", "Stupid Girl" and "My Lover's Box", but there was not enough material in terms of complete lyrics or melodies to give Manson enough to work with. Manson rewrote "Queer" into a trip hop arrangement and added ambiguous lyrics that allowed the listener to make up their own mind about what the song meant. She also re-sang the "Queer" vocal in an understated style. "I wanted to sing it harder but I couldn't. So I sang it all soft," Manson later recalled. Erikson added: "None of the other singers that we tried had that kind of dynamic ability in their vocal." It was then that the band knew that Garbage was going to work. and Erikson called Manson and extended an invitation to join Marker, Vig and himself to complete a full album instead of a few tracks.

For the verses, Marker incorporated a drum sample from Australian band Single Gun Theory's track "Man of Straw" on "Queer"; this loop was layered with an additional drum part performed by Madison percussionist Clyde Stubblefield, who was known for being the most sampled drummer in history for his uncredited part on James Brown's "Funky Drummer". Vig opted to hire Stubblefield to play on the record rather than sample him as "you don't use a sample when the genius who played the sample lives down the street from you", and the drummer also contributed to album cut "Not My Idea". Bass guitar parts were completed by Milwaukee session bassist Mike Kashou. The band wanted to sample a clarinet part from a Frank Sinatra record, but the licensing for the sample would have been prohibitively expensive. Mulling over some options, such as having a session musician interpolate the part themselves still led to having to pay large royalties. The idea was dropped. The band still liked the idea of using a clarinet, and recorded a part by Les Thimming on the final mix.

Manson later explained, "It's not, as you might think, to do with being gay, but tolerance. My granny has the expression 'Or's queer, except thee and me, and sometimes even thee's queer', that is that you think you are normal and the rest of the world is freaky, but we're all equally to blame". Garbage did not write the song to particularly appeal to the gay community; however, Erikson stated: "As musicians, we're totally open to [the song's gay appeal]. There's been enough exposure to gay issues in the mainstream media that people are finally ready to deal with it. Even if it's something controversial, people are still beginning to open up". Erikson added: "The song isn't about sex at all, it's about the loss of innocence".

== Release ==
In August 1995, Almo Sounds serviced "Queer" to alternative radio in the United States. After four weeks, sixty alternative stations were playing "Queer" on the air, enabling it to debut on the Modern Rock Tracks chart at number 30 and the Hot 100 Airplay chart at number 62. A week later, Garbage debuted on the Billboard 200 at number 193, while "Queer" peaked at number 57 on the airplay chart. "Queer" was then serviced to Top 40 radio stations on October 31, ahead of the bands first ever live dates. In its first week, "Queer" was added to fifteen Top 40 playlists and a further fifteen a week later. On alternative radio, now with an average of 1,500 plays a week, "Queer" peaked at number 12 after nine weeks on air; at Top 40, the song was airing more modestly. On November 11, remixes of "Queer" by Adrian Sherwood and Rabbit in the Moon were pressed to 12" vinyl and distributed to dance clubs. The fourteen week chart-run of "Queer" at alternative ultimately extended into December.

On October 23, 1995, "Queer" was issued as the band's second single in Australia and New Zealand. The band's Australian distributor White Label issued a three-track CD single and cassette single backed with two new tracks, "Girl Don't Come" and "Sleep", which had been recorded for the recent UK release of "Only Happy When It Rains". "Queer" peaked at number 55 in Australia, spending twelve weeks on the ARIA singles chart. In New Zealand, "Queer" debuted on the RIANZ singles chart at number 45 at the start of November, rising three weeks later to a peak position of number 37.

Initially, Mushroom Records had scheduled "Queer" to be the lead single for the UK release of the debut album Garbage, matching the international single release strategy. At last minute, it was decided to release "Only Happy When It Rains" upfront of the album, with "Queer" rescheduled to later in 1995 to coincide with the band's first UK live show. "Queer" was quickly picked up by radio, and was B-listed by Radio One, whose breakfast slot DJ Chris Evans championed it as his "Single of the Week", and playlisted by Virgin Radio. "Queer" reached number 35 on the airplay chart. Mushroom issued the single on a limited edition specially packaged 7-inch vinyl and a gold-pressed and silver-pressed CD single set on November 20, 1995. Each CD single was backed with a newly recorded track—"Trip My Wire" on the first and a cover version of The Jam's "Butterfly Collector" on the second. Four remixes of the title track were spread out across the CDs, with one also appearing on the flipside of the vinyl.

"Queer" was the first Garbage single to include remixes as a commercial B-side; Mushroom spread four across the UK formats. These were completed by producers Adrian Sherwood, Danny Saber, Depeche Mode's Martin Gore, and Florida-based group Rabbit in the Moon. In 2007, the "Heftybag" mix by Rabbit in the Moon was remastered and included on the limited edition of greatest hits collection Absolute Garbage. In 2015, all five remixes of "Queer" were remastered and included as on the Garbage (20th Anniversary Super Deluxe Edition) digital bundle.

Early indications showed that the single had a midweek position of number 10; however, at the end of its first week on-sale, "Queer" debuted on the UK Singles Chart at number 13. That week, Garbage made a live appearance to perform the single on Top of The Pops, and performed both "Queer" and "Only Happy When it Rains" on MTV's Most Wanted.

Across Europe, "Queer" was issued by BMG in a similar fashion to the Australian formats; a three-track CD single release, backed with "Girl Don't Come" and "Sleep". At the end of December, MTV Europe playlisted the "Queer" video with Buzz Bin status for six weeks. By the start of 1996, "Queer" was picking up airplay across the continent; with strong support from alternative rock radio stations over the first nine weeks of the year. In Belgium's Wallonia region, "Queer" peaked at number 24 at the end of January. "Queer" debuted and peaked at number seven in Iceland the following month. In Spain, "Queer" peaked at number 33 on their airplay chart. In April, performed "Queer" live on French television show Nulle Part Ailleurs and headlined a show at the Élysée Montmartre in Paris; To support this, BMG France released a new three-track CD single of "Queer" backed with "Trip My Wire" and the Rabbit in the Moon remix.

=== Collector's format ===
As Garbage had received significant attention from the special packaging of their first three releases, "Queer" was also released in this manner. Mushroom's product manager had a longer time to design the package than the other singles; this was a result of "Queer" being held back two months so that "Only Happy When It Rains" could launch the album. Garbage's original suggestion for "Queer" was to create a jade velvet box, but Mushroom vetoed the idea over the cost. The label sourced a plastics company to create the case, which was made from injection-molded polystyrene, similar to the process of manufacturing jewel cases. The company charged Mushroom £10,000 to have the mould created. The end product was finished with frosted effect for the "G" logo, which was stickered, and within placed the vinyl record in a card picture sleeve; this cost Mushroom £2.21 per unit (a loss of 95p for each sale). This special single had only 5,000 copies issued. To protect the perspex case, copies were distributed in a bubble-wrap wallet; some copies also retailed within a pink G-logo branded carrier bag.

== Critical reception ==
Upon both the release of Garbage and the release of "Queer" as a single, the song received a positive reception from music journalists. Steve Baltin from Cash Box noted that it "has a smooth, silky sensual, slightly techno beat driving it that will crawl into listeners’ minds and slither its way through the bloodstream like a libidinous eel. That’s a good thing, by the way." Leo Finlay, in a Music Week article highlighting the campaign for the debut album's release wrote, "'Queer' is eerily reminiscent of Magazine's stranger moments". A reviewer for NME wrote that the single was "an ode to recognising and tolerating those mis-shapen ones among us", and when reviewing the album, their own Shannon O'Connell wrote, "there is a bit of Pat Benatar in [this songs] back-alley swagger". A reviewer for Vox described "Queer" as "Voice of the Beehive roughing up L7", Jackie Hinden of Hot Press wrote that the song was "a slinky work-out against a restrained work-to-rule industrial backing", and the publication later made it their Single of the Fortnight, describing it as "Almost indecently brilliant. There's an intelligence at work here in the lyrics and in the music which makes "Queer" a unique proposition, and Garbage utterly indispensable". A writer for Melody Maker wrote that "Queer" was "sleek, cultivated perversion... sinister and menacing", while Raw's review described it as "brilliant, Seductive and slow-burning", and the single reviewer for NME considered that Manson's performance "elevates a sing-song shuffle into a lullaby to sexual non-conformity". Rolling Stone described the song as a "more roundly shaped tune orchestrated with this same love of junk and command of finesse." Kerrang! rated "Queer" as their Single of the Week, stating "an incredible knee-trembling fuck tune... the dirtiest pop tune you'll hear all year. [You'll be] sucked into dark satin sexiness and you'll never want to leave. Gorgeously decadent and utterly fabulous."

== Music video ==
Garbage attacking the detained protagonist of the "Queer" video

The music video for "Queer" directed by Stéphane Sednaoui for Propaganda Films and was filmed in July 1995 in Los Angeles. Filming locations included at Fairfax Avenue sidewalks and under the East 4th St bridge over South Santa Fe Avenue. Sedanoui's video concept developed from his own personal experience of being "shredded into pieces" by a beautiful woman. Garbage loved his storyboard for "Queer", feeling it matched the ambiguous nature of the song. Manson had chosen Sednaoui as director after she saw the "Big Time Sensuality" music video he directed for Björk, and later said that Sednaoui "doesn't just take an idea and apply it to different artists, he seems to be able to figure out where the artist is coming from and make the photographs and the videos unique to that group."

The black and white storyline of the video saw a young male's first person perspective of exiting an elevator onto a Los Angeles street and meeting Manson. She coyly entices him to follow her to her home where the men from Garbage are waiting. They detain him inside, forcing him up onto the second-level of the house, where Manson throws him to the floor, strips him of his clothing and blinds him with gaffer tape. He recovers to find Manson shaving his head, before she drags him outside by his legs. He is then seen strangely happy, and in full color, leaving the street.

Director Stéphane Sednaoui shot the whole video himself with a hand-held camera. Here singer Shirley Manson spins him.

Sednaoui operated the camera for the whole shoot. To capture the victim's struggle, Sednaoui positioned the camera at ground-level facing upwards towards Garbage, who were standing on a rotating platform. To suggest the victim was almost hallucinating, strobe lighting was combined with the rotation of the platform, however the effect caused the band to suffer from vertigo after a number of takes. Manson later claimed that the video helped establish her group; "He really defined for us who we were visually. Stéphane was able to look at the band and listen to the music and figure out what was the perfect visual partner for the band. People think we're a very stylish band, and it's all to do with him". She added, "I'm really proud of "Queer", I think it's one of our best videos."

The "Queer" video premiered on North American networks on August 14, 1995; where it was given heavy support by MTV from September 15; in December, MTV Europe certified the video a Buzz Clip. MTV requested an edit to obscure the shot of Manson blinding the video's protagonist before playlisting it. The music video for "Queer" was nominated in the Breakthrough Video category at the 1996 MTV Video Music Awards, losing to Smashing Pumpkins' "Tonight, Tonight". The silver dress Manson wore in the video was later donated to the Hard Rock Hotel & Casino in Las Vegas, Nevada for indefinite display.

The "Queer" video was first commercially released, accompanied with outtake footage from the shoot, on 1996's Garbage Video VHS and Video-CD. A remastered version was included on Garbage's 2007 greatest hits DVD Absolute Garbage and made available as a digital download via online music services the same year. The video was uploaded to YouTube in 2013.

== Track listings ==
- UK 7-inch Crystal™ sleeve
1. "Queer" – 4:04
2. "Queer (The Very Queer Dub Bin) – 5:12
- UK CD 1
1. "Queer" – 4:04
2. "Trip My Wire" – 4:29
3. "Queer" (The Very Queer Dub Bin) – 5:12
4. "Queer" (The Most Beautiful Woman in Town Mix) – 5:36
- UK CD 2
1. "Queer" – 4:04
2. "Butterfly Collector" – 3:41
3. "Queer" (F.T.F.O.I. Mix) – 7:17
4. "Queer" (Danny Saber Mix) – 5:39
- Australia CD/cassette single, Europe CD single
1. "Queer" – 4:05
2. "Girl Don't Come" – 2:33
3. "Sleep" – 2:31
- France CD single
1. "Queer" – 4:05
2. "Queer" (F.T.F.O.I. Mix) – 7:17
3. "Trip My Wire" – 4:29
- UK 12-inch single (Queer Remixes)
1. "Queer" (Rabbit in the Moon Hefty Mix) – 9:10
2. "Queer" (Danny Saber Mix) – 5:39

== Charts ==
=== Weekly charts ===
Chart (1995–1996)	Peak position
Australia (ARIA)	55
Belgium (Ultratop 50 Wallonia)	24
Canada Rock/Alternative (RPM)	6
Europe (European Hot 100 Singles)	51
Iceland (Íslenski Listinn Topp 40)	7
Netherlands (Dutch Top 40 Tipparade)	17
Netherlands (Dutch Single Tip)	4
New Zealand (Recorded Music NZ)	37
Scottish Singles Sales (Official Charts)	20
Spain Airplay (AFYVE)	33
UK Singles (Official Charts)	13
US Radio Songs (Billboard)	57
US Alternative Airplay (Billboard)	12

=== Year-end charts ===
Chart (1995)	Position
Canada Rock/Alternative (RPM)	14

== Release history ==
Region	Date	Format	Label	References
United States	August 1995	Modern rock radio	Almo Sounds	
Australia	October 23, 1995	CD single; cassette single	White Label	
United States	October 31, 1995	Contemporary hit radio	Almo Sounds	
United States	November 11, 1995	Club play (12-inch promos)	Almo Sounds	
United Kingdom	November 20, 1995	CD single; 7-inch single	Mushroom	
Europe	November 20, 1995	CD maxi single	BMG	
France	April 1996	CD single	BMG France	
United Kingdom	May 5, 1997	12-inch single (Queer Remixes)	Mushroom	
