= Stupid Girl (Garbage song) =

1996 single by Garbage

Single by Garbage

from the album Garbage
- B-side: "Driving Lesson"; "Alien Sex Fiend"
- Released: January 22, 1996 (Aus); March 11, 1996 (UK)
- Recorded: 1994
- Studio: Smart (Madison, Wisconsin)
- Genre: Alternative rock; electronic rock
- Length: 4:18
- Label: Almo
- Songwriters: Garbage; Joe Strummer; Mick Jones
- Producer: Garbage

Garbage singles chronology
| "Only Happy When It Rains" (1995) | "Stupid Girl" (1996) | "Milk" (1996) |

Music video
- "Stupid Girl" on YouTube

"Stupid Girl" is a song by American rock band Garbage from their self-titled debut studio album (1995). It was written and produced by band members Duke Erikson, Shirley Manson, Steve Marker and Butch Vig. "Stupid Girl" features lyrics about a young woman's ambivalence and is a musical arrangement centered on a repetitive bassline and a drum sample from the Clash's 1979 song "Train in Vain".

The song was released by Almo Sounds in North America, and Mushroom Records worldwide, as the band's fourth international single in 1996. It became the band's highest-charting single in both the United States and the United Kingdom, with its performance on the charts driven by its music video and remixes that gained massive airplay across the world. The success of "Stupid Girl" propelled sales of its parent album Garbage into the top 20 of the Billboard 200 and into the top 10 of the UK Albums Chart.

Reviews of the song were positive, with praise for the production. "Stupid Girl" was nominated for two Grammy Awards, Best Rock Song and Best Rock Performance by a Duo or Group, as well as the Danish Grammy for Best Rock Song, an MTV Video Music Award for Best New Artist and an MTV Europe Music Award for Best Song.

== Development ==
=== Production ===
"Stupid Girl" began as a rough demo around January 1994. It was recorded during informal studio sessions with Duke Erikson, Steve Marker and Butch Vig in Marker's home basement recording studio in Madison, Wisconsin, prior to Shirley Manson joining the group. The band had been jamming using an ADAT eight-track, Akai samplers and a small drum kit. Vig took a loop from the drum introduction to the Clash's "Train in Vain" and added further percussion including a sample of "Orange Crush" by R.E.M. Later, Marker was asked to create a bassline like that of Creedence Clearwater Revival's "Suzie Q", "something that's almost like a Motown feel." Erikson finished what became the song's core with a jangly guitar riff.

After Marker saw Manson's group Angelfish on MTV's 120 Minutes, the band invited her to Vig and Marker's Smart Studios to sing on a couple of songs, but after a "dreadful" first audition, she returned to Angelfish. Manson eventually returned to Smart for a successful second attempt, when she began to work on the basic forms of "Queer", "Vow" and "Stupid Girl".

Manson's lyrics for "Stupid Girl" became an "anthem for a girl who won't settle for less than what she wants." She later added, "["Stupid Girl" is] really about squandering potential, [it's] our version of Madonna's 'Express Yourself', but a little more subversive." Manson intended the song as a rebuke toward a friend's foolish behavior: "A lot of females still find it difficult to find their own voice in society. It's just that women have a different set of problems from men... make the most of your potential." Manson added that "Stupid Girl" was "a song of reproach to a lot of people we know", both male and female, and that "we could have called it 'Stupid Guy,' but we thought another song about a strident female dissing a guy would be tedious."

"Stupid Girl"
Sample of "Stupid Girl", showing the pre-chorus and first part of the chorus. The music is based on a drum sample from the Clash, and this part of the song incorporates sound effects such as that of a broken DAT player.

Garbage wanted to write a song that incorporated a thumping, repetitive bassline to act as a hook. Continuing to develop the demo throughout the recording process for what would eventually become the band's debut album, the group decided to add textures, guitars and keyboards to make "Stupid Girl" dynamic rather than the product of complicated chord changes. Marker and Vig then added in elements of ambient sound effects throughout the audio mix, including the "glitchy" sound of a broken DAT player used during the pre-chorus. Marker had been dubbing between audio tracks, resulting in scratchy feedback; he sampled the sound and tuned it to fit the song, unintentionally created by an alternative hook. When Manson recorded her first vocals for "Stupid Girl", the band realized that the song's key was too low, but instead of re-recording the guitars, Vig re-printed them through a pitch-change patch on an effects unit. Erikson commented that the effects are "just ear candy, but they contribute to the character of the song, make the listener think in a certain way about the song." Additional percussion on "Stupid Girl" was performed by Madison musician Pauli Ryan, while the bass guitar line was played on the record by Milwaukee session bassist Mike Kashou, both of whom performed on several other tracks on the album.

Reflecting on the success of the song in 2002, Vig admitted: "People still ask us who the 'Stupid Girl' is, and that's impossible to answer. The song is sort of meant to be a wake up call. It could be about an ex-girlfriend. It could be about a rock diva that we all know, it could be about your sister. It could also be called 'Stupid Boy'." Looking back, he also stated, "It's impossible to predict what will be a hit. But subconsciously, I knew the song was good when I kept playing the same rough mix over and over again on my car stereo for months."

=== Composition ===
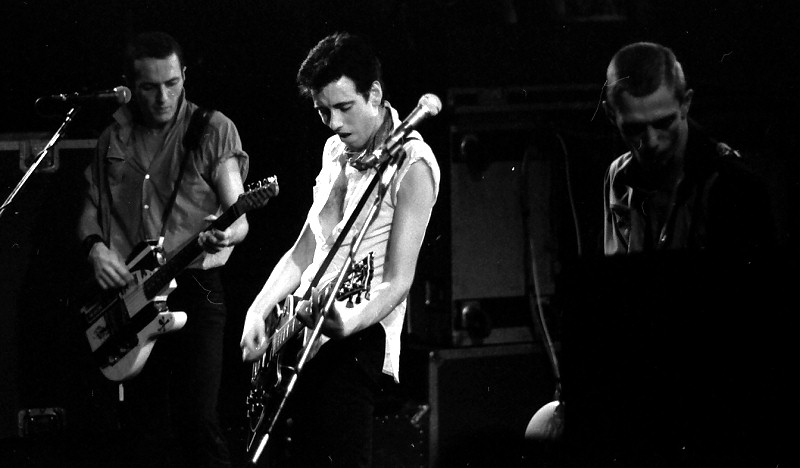
The drum intro from the Clash's "Train in Vain" is used throughout "Stupid Girl".

"Stupid Girl" is a moderately fast alternative rock and electro-rock song with touches of electronica, set in common time. It is built on a I–IV change in F♯, with both chords, F♯7 and B7.

The tonal function of a dominant seventh chord is to resolve up a perfect fourth. In non-classical harmony, the chord is often used similarly, but especially in blues, funk, and early rock music, it is also commonly used for its color, which seems to mesh major and minor together with its major third, minor seventh and the dissonant interval between the two. When the F♯7 chord is played, it should traditionally resolve to a B major 7th chord, the M7 being the major 3rd of the tonic.

Instead, on the B note is another dominant seventh. Such chords are the basis of the twelve-bar blues, and are used in this way to give "Stupid Girl" a bluesy, rock-'n'-roll feel. The chord change is manipulated to emphasize the B's flatted seventh (a minor third from the tonic), giving the song a sulky mood. This chord change is used for the intro, verse, chorus and the instrumental sections, except for the pre-chorus, which is in the relative key of D♯ minor. Regardless of the chord progression, the song seems to fall somewhere between major and minor, and the use of four-note seventh chords (as opposed to "three-note" chords) help to form a rich atmosphere. "Stupid Girl" is mainly carried by this arrangement, along with the drum beats sampled from "Train in Vain".

In the intro, four bars set the rhythm, adorned by only a guitar pick-slide and audio effects. The verse adds Manson's vocals and a bass riff that uses flattened blue notes to give "Stupid Girl" a funky, unsettled feel. The eight-bar pre-chorus abruptly cuts in with minor chords, and sampled feedback replaces the bass, which drops out. This, coupled with Manson singing high in her vocal range, creates tension and enables the presence of the bass to be felt when it re-enters on the chorus. The guitar figures in the bridge include a phrase played low and rhythmic guitar stabs on the opposite side of the audio mix. In the chorus, Manson's main vocal is answered by an "aah-ah" of voice and guitar together. The word "girl" lands on a flattened bass note (A against the F♯ note, instead of A♯).

== Release and promotion ==
"Stupid Girl" was first released in Australia and New Zealand on January 22, 1996, when White Label Records issued both CD and cassette versions backed with "Trip My Wire" (previously included on the "Queer" single in the UK) and remixes of "Queer" by Adrian Sherwood and Martin Gore. A week later, White Label issued a second CD featuring a cover version of the Jam's "Butterfly Collector" and a further two "Queer" mixes produced by Danny Saber and Rabbit in the Moon (also previously released in the UK). In July, White Label released a limited-edition EP titled Stupid Girl: The Remixes collecting the UK B-sides and remixes for the Australian market. BMG released "Stupid Girl" across Europe on February 28. The single was issued as a CD maxi backed with both "Butterfly Collector" and "Trip My Wire". When Garbage returned to tour Europe's rock festivals in August, BMG reissued "Stupid Girl" in France and Germany.

Mushroom Records sent "Stupid Girl" to radio stations in the United Kingdom a month in advance of its release, and it was A-listed at BBC Radio 1, Virgin and Capital. Mushroom issued "Stupid Girl" on March 11 as a double CD single set and limited-edition 7-inch vinyl packaged in two differing colors of cloth fabric, blue or red. The song was backed with "Driving Lesson", a new version of "Dog New Tricks" and a remix of "Stupid Girl" produced by Red Snapper on the first disc, with "Alien Sex Fiend" and two versions of "Stupid Girl" remixed by Dreadzone on the second. The vinyl was backed with the mix of "Dog New Tricks". The single was supported by Garbage's first UK tour, which began on March 19. In the midst of the tour, Garbage performed the single on Top of the Pops and a live showcase performance of "Stupid Girl" and "Only Happy When It Rains" on TFI Friday.

In North America, where "Only Happy When It Rains" had been the band's breakthrough single, Almo Sounds planned either "Stupid Girl" or a re-release of Garbage's debut single "Vow" to follow it up. On May 25, Almo sent "Stupid Girl" to alternative radio, while Garbage joined the Smashing Pumpkins' North American arena tour as the opening act through June and July. The tour was halted after Smashing Pumpkins keyboardist Jonathan Melvoin fatally overdosed, and the Smashing Pumpkins resumed without Garbage a month later. Almo reissued "Stupid Girl", with a remix produced by Todd Terry, to Top 40 radio. On July 9, Almo released "Stupid Girl" on CD and cassette single, backed with "Driving Lesson" and the Todd Terry version. Almo provided remixes of the song to nightclubs. On July 11, Garbage performed "Stupid Girl" on the Late Show with David Letterman, and in October performed the song at the VH1 Fashion Awards, which earned attention because of Manson's wardrobe malfunction. On August 6, Almo issued a 12-inch vinyl featuring "Driving Lesson" and remixes of "Stupid Girl" produced by Todd Terry, Danny Saber, Rabbit in the Moon and Jason Bentley.

=== Remixes ===
In 1996, Mushroom released a white label 12-inch vinyl to clubs featuring the Red Snapper and Dreadzone mixes in advance of the UK release of "Stupid Girl". The Red Snapper mix was later released in Europe on the B-side to "Only Happy When It Rains", while White Records released this mix along with the Dreadzone mixes on the Stupid Girl (The Remixes) extended play. Almo Sounds commissioned additional remixes from Danny Saber, Rabbit in the Moon, Jason Bentley and Todd Terry for the North American release of the single. One of Todd Terry's mixes was also serviced to Top 40 radio. Mushroom later released this version, along with the Danny Saber mix in the UK on the B-side of "Milk", while White included the Todd Terry mix on the bonus disc of the Garbage: Australian Tour Edition. In 1997, Mushroom released four Todd Terry mixes on a set of 12-inch vinyls (Stupid Girl Remixes) in the UK. An instrumental version of the Red Snapper mix was also included on the compilation album Big Beat Elite. In 2007, Todd Terry's radio mix was remastered and included on the Absolute Garbage bonus disc Garbage Mixes.

Danny Saber's remix brief for his version of "Stupid Girl" sought to create a version of the song for radio airplay on new wave/alternative rock stations. Garbage's management wanted Saber to retain the original's "Train in Vain" loop, as it had cost the band a significant amount to license. Saber opted for a Soft Cell/house music combination, incorporating the original vocal line, tempo, key and feedback. Saber created a new bassline for the remix, arranging the mix around it. Saber completed the remix in a single day, with one further day required to mix.

=== B-sides ===
Garbage recorded a number of tracks for the B-side of "Stupid Girl" in January 1996 during rehearsals for their first full-length concert tour. During the rehearsals, Garbage remixed their album track "Dog New Tricks", wrote and recorded "Driving Lesson" and "Alien Sex Fiend". The band also recorded the Vic Chesnutt song "Kick My Ass" for inclusion on the charity album Sweet Relief II: Gravity of the Situation. Daniel Shulman plays bass on all four tracks. On October 14, 1998, Garbage partnered with Electronic Arts, AT&T and Broadcast.com to promote a live webcast from Garbage's headline show at Dallas Bronco Bowl by offering a free .a2b file format digital download of "Driving Lesson", which registered over 6,000 downloads.

== Critical reception and legacy ==
"Stupid Girl" received an overwhelmingly positive response from music critics both upon the release of Garbage and upon its single release. Select's Ian Harrison called the song "Duran-like", describing it as "mighty doomy pop neatly tailored to enhance one's natural discontentment." Vox magazine's Craig McLean called it "malignant, dirty, devious, sneering pop", while Metal Hammer's Pippa Lang compared Manson's "ever-so-sexy, sibilant" vocals to Trent Reznor's. Kerrang! described "Stupid Girl" as "a classy piece of predatory pop perfection that wields an iron punch beneath it's [sic] velvet glove."

The song was nominated for two Grammy Awards, Best Rock Song and Best Rock Performance by a Duo or Group, but lost to Tracy Chapman's "Give Me One Reason" and Dave Matthews Band's "So Much to Say", respectively. "Stupid Girl" was also nominated for a Danish Grammy for Best Rock Song, and for the MTV Europe Music Award for Best Song. In 1997, Broadcast Music, Inc. awarded "Stupid Girl" a Citation of Achievement for Best Pop Song, meaning it was among the year's most-performed songs. Erikson said the song was "a crowd favorite" that improves the set list's mood whenever it gets played, and Vig added that "we've played 'Stupid Girl' on stage more than a thousand times and I'm still not sick of it."

In 2005, "Stupid Girl" was featured in Curtis Hanson's film In Her Shoes, while later that year, Alexz Johnson recorded a cover version of the track for the soundtrack album Songs from Instant Star. In 2011, it was nominated for the final track listing on STV's Scotland's Greatest Album.

== Commercial performance ==
"Stupid Girl" made its first chart appearance on the Australian ARIA Singles Chart in the week ending February 4, 1996, debuting at number 99 and peaking at number 47 on March 24, 1996. The single charted for two non-consecutive weeks on the New Zealand Top 40, peaking at number 32 in February. In Iceland, "Stupid Girl" debuted at number 18 in early April, and rose to number 4 the following week, where it remained for three weeks. In Spain, "Stupid Girl" peaked at number 40 on the airplay chart. In Ireland, "Stupid Girl" peaked at number 16. In France, "Stupid Girl" peaked at number 38 on the singles chart.

On March 4, 1996, "Stupid Girl" debuted at number 48 on the UK Airplay Chart. Two weeks later, the song debuted as the highest new entry on the UK Singles Chart at number four, becoming Garbage's highest-peaking single in the United Kingdom to date. In its second week, "Stupid Girl" dropped to number 10. On the airplay chart, "Stupid Girl" peaked at number five and spent the entire following month within the top 10. "Stupid Girl" spend seven weeks in the top 75 and sold 120,000 copies. In August 2007, the single re-entered the UK Singles Chart at number 194, based on digital sales from Garbage's greatest hits album Absolute Garbage.

In North America, Almo Sounds serviced "Stupid Girl" to alternative radio on May 20, where after its first week on air it debuted on the Modern Rock Tracks chart at number 38. Two weeks later, it broke into the Modern Rock top 20 with an "Airpower" rating, meaning the song had registered over 900 plays for the first time on alternative radio. The song debuted at number 66 on the Hot 100 Airplay chart. At the end of the month, "Stupid Girl" reached the top 10 on the Modern Rock chart, peaking at number two in August, and not leaving the top 10 until September. The remixes were featured on the Hot Dance Breakouts list, as "Stupid Girl" debuted at number 46 on the Hot 100.

By August, "Stupid Girl" continued to chart, debuting at number 68 on the Hot 100 Singles Sales chart, at number 47 on the Top 40 Mainstream chart and at number 46 on the Hot Dance Music/Club Play chart. The remix album peaked at number 30 on the Hot Dance Music/Maxi-Singles Sales chart. In mid-August, "Stupid Girl" peaked at number 26 on the Hot 100 Airplay chart and picked up enough mainstream rock airplay to spend two weeks at number 39 on the Mainstream Rock Tracks chart. In early September, "Stupid Girl" became a crossover success on both alternate and contemporary hit radio, and it reached number 25 on the Top 40 Mainstream chart. Two weeks later, the song became Garbage's highest-peaking single on the Hot 100 when it reached number 24. It also peaked at number 33 on the Hot 100 Singles Sales chart and at number five on the Hot Dance Music/Club Play chart. "Stupid Girl" continued to gain a larger crossover audience throughout October, debuting on the Adult Top 40. The song left the Modern Rock chart in mid-November after 25 weeks and remained on the Hot 100 for 20 weeks until the start of December.

== Music video ==
The music video's distinctive look was inspired by the title sequence of Seven (1995), and was achieved by director Samuel Bayer cutting, soaking and scratching the film negative.

The music video for "Stupid Girl" was filmed on January 16, 1996, in a Los Angeles warehouse by director Samuel Bayer. The four-hour shoot took place after filming the "Only Happy When It Rains" music video. The "Stupid Girl" video was given a smaller budget, as Almo Sounds believed that "Only Happy When It Rains" would be more commercially successful than "Stupid Girl". According to Manson, the other band members were drunk and exhausted after three days shooting the first video.

The "Stupid Girl" video debuted internationally on February 1, 1996, and in North America on May 5. MTV added the video the week of May 13 and certified "Stupid Girl" a Buzz Clip. It was the band's third consecutive video to be guaranteed heavy airplay on the network. VH1 added the video in early September and featured it in a Pop-Up Video episode.

The video for "Stupid Girl" is a performance piece inspired by the title sequence from David Fincher's 1995 film Seven. The clip was shot in a warehouse decorated with plexiglas sheets upon which the song's lyrics were written. Bayer cut the film into pieces and soaked it in his bath, applying deliberate fingerprints and abrasions to the footage before putting it back together by hand. "Film is generally treated like this pristine canvas", Bayer later explained, "If it's scratched, it's considered ruined. I wanted to add to the excitement of "Stupid Girl" with a really organic video, something that had a handmade quality." To accomplish this, Bayer showed some of the filmmaking process itself; Manson is shown behind a clapperboard and reels visibly spool past the frame, while penned marks, sprocket holes, spots and reference numbers are seen. At one point, the frame lurches, as if to suggest that the camera operator has lost control of the camera. Bayer's colorist made use of sepia, blues, greens and reds to suggest that each frame was individually hand-tinted. Vig would compliment the video for mirroring the band's sound: "some of it looked beautiful, some of it looked distorted, and kinda fucked up - and it sorta described some of our music visually." Bayer later re-edited a second version of the video, with alternative footage from the original shoot, for a remix version of "Stupid Girl" by Todd Terry.

The "Stupid Girl" video earned Garbage a nomination for Best New Artist in a Video at the 1996 MTV Video Music Awards, losing to Alanis Morissette's "Ironic".

The "Stupid Girl" video was first commercially released on VHS and Video-CD on 1996's Garbage Video, along with "making-of" outtake footage. A remastered version was later included on Garbage's 2007 greatest-hits DVD Absolute Garbage, and was made available as a digital download via online music services the same year. The video was officially uploaded to YouTube in November 2013.

== Track listings ==
- European CD single
1. "Stupid Girl" – 4:19
2. "Butterfly Collector" – 3:41
3. "Trip My Wire" – 4:29
- Australian CD1 and cassette single 1
1. "Stupid Girl" – 4:19
2. "Trip My Wire" – 4:29
3. "Queer" (The Very Queer Dub Bin) – 5:12
4. "Queer" (The Most Beautiful Woman in Town Mix) – 5:36
- Australia CD2 and cassette single 2
1. "Stupid Girl" – 4:19
2. "Butterfly Collector" – 3:41
3. "Queer" (F.T.F.O.I. Mix) – 7:17
4. "Queer" (Danny Saber Mix) – 5:39
- UK CD1
1. "Stupid Girl" – 4:19
2. "Driving Lesson" – 3:48
3. "Dog New Tricks" (The Pal mix) – 4:02
4. "Stupid Girl" (Red Snapper mix) – 7:37
- UK CD2
1. "Stupid Girl" – 4:19
2. "Alien Sex Fiend" – 4:37
3. "Stupid Girl" (Dreadzone dub version) – 6:08
4. "Stupid Girl" (Dreadzone vocal mix) – 6:34
- UK 7-inch single

A. "Stupid Girl" – 4:19
B. "Dog New Tricks" (The Pal mix) – 4:02

- US CD and cassette single
1. "Stupid Girl" – 4:19
2. "Stupid Girl" (Tee's radio edit) – 3:49
3. "Driving Lesson" – 3:48
- US 12-inch single

A1. "Stupid Girl" (Todd Terry Freeze Club) – 5:53
A2. "Stupid Girl" (Todd Terry In House Dub) – 6:11
A3. "Stupid Girl" (Future Retro Mix) – 5:20
B1. "Stupid Girl" (Danny Saber Mix) – 4:23
B2. "Stupid Girl" (Shoegazer Mix) – 5:53
B3. "Driving Lesson" – 3:48

- French CD single
1. "Stupid Girl" – 4:19
2. "Stupid Girl" (Dreadzone dub version) – 6:08
3. "Dog New Tricks" (The Pal mix) – 4:02
- German CD single
1. "Stupid Girl" (Radio edit) – 3:44
2. "Stupid Girl" – 4:19
- Australian CD single (The Remixes)
1. "Stupid Girl" (Dreadzone vocal mix) – 6:34
2. "Stupid Girl" (Dreadzone dub version) – 6:08
3. "Stupid Girl" (Red Snapper mix) – 7:37
4. "Stupid Girl" – 4:19
5. "Alien Sex Fiend" – 4:37
- UK 12-inch single (Remixes)

A1. "Stupid Girl" (Todd Terry Freeze Club) – 5:53
A2. "Stupid Girl" (Todd Terry Bonus Beats) – 3:11
B1. "Stupid Girl" (Todd Terry In House Dub) – 6:11
B2. "Stupid Girl" (Todd Terry Capella) – 3:34

== Charts ==
=== Weekly charts ===
Weekly chart performance
| Chart (1996–2001) | Peak position |
|---|---|
| Australia (ARIA) | 47 |
| Canada Top Singles (RPM) | 30 |
| Canada Rock/Alternative (RPM) | 2 |
| Europe Airplay (European Hit Radio) | 19 |
| Europe Sales (European Hot 100 Singles) | 27 |
| France (SNEP) | 38 |
| Iceland (Íslenski Listinn Topp 40) | 4 |
| Ireland (IRMA) | 16 |
| Mainland Europe (Atlantic Crossovers) | 9 |
| Netherlands (Dutch Top 40 Tipparade) | 10 |
| Netherlands (Dutch Single Tip) | 6 |
| New Zealand (Recorded Music NZ) | 32 |
| Scottish Singles Sales (Official Charts) | 8 |
| UK Airplay (Music & Media) | 14 |
| UK Rock & Metal Sales (Official Charts) | 1 |
| UK (UK Singles Chart) | 4 |
| US Billboard Hot 100 | 24 |
| US Adult Pop Airplay (Billboard) | 36 |
| US Alternative Airplay (Billboard) | 2 |
| US Dance Club Songs (Billboard) | 5 |
| US Dance Singles Sales (Billboard) | 30 |
| US Mainstream Rock (Billboard) | 39 |
| US Pop Airplay (Billboard) | 25 |
| US Cash Box Top 100 | 19 |

=== Year-end charts ===
Year-end chart performance
| Chart (1996) | Position |
|---|---|
| Canada Rock/Alternative (RPM) | 20 |
| Iceland (Íslenski Listinn Topp 40) | 67 |
| UK Airplay (Music Week) | 36 |
| UK (UK Singles Chart) | 113 |
| US Modern Rock Tracks (Billboard) | 10 |

== Certifications ==
Certifications and sales
| Region | Certification | Certified units/sales |
|---|---|---|
| New Zealand (RMNZ) | Gold | 15,000^{‡} |
| United Kingdom (BPI) | Silver | 200,000^{‡} |
^{‡} Sales+streaming figures based on certification alone.
