= Buzz Bin =

Music video program

MTV's Buzz Bin was a select group of music videos by up and coming artists and bands that the network deemed "buzz worthy", "cutting edge", or "the next big thing". As such, the selected videos received heavy rotation on the channel, and were also featured in special promotional commercials that highlighted the latest Buzz Bin selections, which were sometimes known as Buzz Clips.

The Buzz Bin began in 1987, and featured artists and bands from all genres of music (not just alternative rock or modern rock acts, although those were the majority). Many music industry trade publications have noted the direct effect Buzz Bin selection has had on album sales, with some sources stating that upwards of 75% of the selected acts have gone on to achieve RIAA Gold Certification or better. In 1992, The New York Times noted the Buzz Bin label's power in increasing sales and creating hit songs and Entertainment Weekly called it "Alternative rock's best friend."

In an article published in the journal of Music and Science, Osborn, Rossin, and Weingarten conducted a thorough content analysis of 288 Buzz Clips videos to "assess the kinds of people and cultural practices MTV promoted as buzzworthy in the 1990s." The study found high degrees of correlation between gender ethnicity, instrumentation, and genre: BIPOC musicians' videos were often coded as hip-hop or R&B, featuring drum machines and keyboards; white musicians' videos featured more electric guitars; and women were shown playing instruments with less frequency than men.

The Buzz Bin ended in 2004 and was split in half into MTV's "Discover and Download" and VH1's "You Oughta Know".

MTV released two compilation CDs of Buzz Bin tracks, on Mammoth Records.

== Artists featured in the Buzz Bin ==
=== # ===
- 10,000 Maniacs
- 311
- 3rd Bass
- 50 Cent

=== A ===
- AFI
- Christina Aguilera
- Akon
- The Alarm
- Alice in Chains
- Alien Ant Farm
- The All-American Rejects
- Amerie
- Tori Amos
- Sunshine Anderson
- Andy Prieboy
- Fiona Apple
- Tasmin Archer
- Arrested Development
- At The Drive-In
- The Ataris
- Audioslave
- Aztec Camera

=== B ===
- The B-52s
- Erykah Badu
- BBMak
- Beastie Boys
- Beck
- Adrian Belew
- Belly
- Tony Bennett
- Better Than Ezra
- Big Audio Dynamite
- Bingoboys
- Björk
- The Black Eyed Peas
- Blind Melon
- Blink-182
- The Blue Nile
- Blur
- Tracy Bonham
- Brand New
- Brand New Heavies
- The Brandos
- The Breeders
- Edie Brickell & New Bohemians
- Buckcherry
- Jeff Buckley
- Joe Budden
- Bush
- Kate Bush
- Butthole Surfers

=== C ===
- Cake
- The Call
- Camouflage
- Camper Van Beethoven
- Cam'ron
- The Cardigans
- Vanessa Carlton
- The Charlatans
- The Chemical Brothers
- Neneh Cherry
- Toni Childs
- Chingy
- The Church
- CIV
- Coheed and Cambria
- Cold
- Coldplay
- Edwyn Collins
- Common
- Concrete Blonde
- Julian Cope
- Cornershop
- Nikka Costa
- Elvis Costello
- Counting Crows
- Cowboy Junkies
- Cracker
- The Cranberries
- Crash Test Dummies
- The Cure
- Mark Curry
- Cypress Hill

=== D ===
- D'Angelo
- Terence Trent D'Arby
- Daddy Freddy
- Daft Punk
- The Dandy Warhols
- Danzig
- The Darkness
- Dashboard Confessional
- Dave Matthews Band
- Craig David
- Howie Day
- De La Soul
- Deep Forest
- Definition Of Sound
- Deftones
- Depeche Mode
- dEUS
- Dido
- Dig
- Digable Planets
- Dinosaur Jr.
- Disturbed
- The Divinyls
- DNA
- Fefe Dobson
- Dog's Eye View
- Thomas Dolby
- The Donnas
- Drivin N Cryin
- Drowning Pool
- Bob Dylan
- Ms. Dynamite

=== E ===
- Eels
- Elastica
- Elephant Man
- Missy Elliott
- EMF
- Eminem
- Enigma
- Erasure
- Evanescence
- Faith Evans
- Eve
- Eve 6
- Everclear

=== F ===
- Fabolous
- Faith No More
- The Farm
- Dionne Farris
- Fastball
- Fatboy Slim
- Bryan Ferry
- Filter
- The Flaming Lips
- Flesh For Lulu
- Folk Implosion
- Foo Fighters
- Forest for the Trees
- Fountains of Wayne
- Franz Ferdinand
- Freestylers
- Frente
- Fuel

=== G ===
- Garbage
- Gene Loves Jezebel
- Gin Blossoms
- Allen Ginsberg
- The Godfathers
- Godsmack
- Goo Goo Dolls
- Gorillaz
- David Gray
- Macy Gray
- Green Day
- Guadalcanal Diary

=== H ===
- Hanson
- Happy Mondays
- Helmet
- Robyn Hitchcock and the Egyptians
- The Hives
- Hole
- Hoodoo Gurus
- Hot Boys
- The House Of Love
- Hunters & Collectors

=== I ===
- Enrique Iglesias
- Natalie Imbruglia
- Incubus
- India.Arie
- Indigo Girls

=== J ===
- James
- Jamiroquai
- Jane's Addiction
- Jellyfish
- The Jesus & Mary Chain
- Jesus Jones
- Jimmie's Chicken Shack
- Jimmy Eat World
- Norah Jones
- Junior Senior
- Jurassic 5
- JXL v. Elvis

=== K ===
- Kelis
- Alicia Keys
- Kid Rock
- Kina
- King's X
- Kittie
- The KLF
- Lenny Kravitz

=== L ===
- The La's
- LaTour
- Avril Lavigne
- The Lemonheads
- Len
- Julian Lennon
- Letters To Cleo
- Glenn Lewis
- The Lightning Seeds
- Lil' Jon
- Lil' Scrappy
- Limp Bizkit
- Linkin Park
- Live
- Living Colour
- The Lo Fidelity Allstars
- Lisa Loeb & Nine Stories
- Jennifer Lopez
- Monie Love
- Love and Rockets
- Lucy Pearl
- Baz Luhrmann
- Kevin Lyttle

=== M ===
- Marilyn Manson
- Ziggy Marley and the Melody Makers
- Maroon 5
- Ricky Martin
- John Mayer
- Mazzy Star
- Sarah McLachlan
- Men Without Hats
- M.I.A.
- Midnight Oil
- The Mighty Lemon Drops
- They Might Be Giants
- Mighty Mighty Bosstones
- The Mission UK
- Moby
- Alanis Morissette
- Morrissey
- Bob Mould
- Mudvayne
- Peter Murphy
- Musiq

=== N ===
- Nada Surf
- Bif Naked
- Ned's Atomic Dustbin
- New Found Glory
- New Order
- The New Radicals
- Nine Inch Nails
- Nirvana
- No Doubt

=== O ===
- Oasis
- Sinéad O'Connor
- The Offspring
- Orgy
- Joan Osborne
- Outkast

=== P ===
- P.O.D.
- Papa Roach
- Pavement
- Pearl Jam
- Liz Phair
- Pharrell
- P!nk
- The Pixies
- P.M. Dawn
- Iggy Pop
- Porno For Pyros
- Portishead
- Powerman 5000
- The Presidents of the United States of America
- Primal Scream
- Primitive Radio Gods
- The Primitives
- The Prodigy
- Psychedelic Furs
- Public Image Ltd.

=== Q ===
- Finley Quaye

=== R ===
- R.E.M.
- Radiohead
- Rage Against the Machine
- Rammstein
- Rancid
- Ranking Roger
- Red Hot Chili Peppers
- Lou Reed
- Reef
- The Refreshments
- The Rembrandts
- The Rentals
- The Replacements
- Republica
- Res
- Busta Rhymes
- The Robert Rawson Duet
- Rocket From the Crypt
- The Roots

=== S ===
- Scarface
- Jill Scott
- Screaming Blue Messiahs
- Screaming Trees
- Seal
- Erick Sermon, Redman and Keith Murray
- Semisonic
- Shakespears Sister
- Shakira
- Shudder To Think
- Silverchair
- Simple Minds
- Siouxsie and the Banshees
- The Smashing Pumpkins
- Patti Smith
- The Smithereens
- The Smiths
- Jill Sobule
- Social Distortion
- Sonic Youth
- Soul Asylum
- Soundgarden
- The Soup Dragons
- Space Monkeys
- Spacehog
- Spearhead
- Sponge
- Squirrel Nut Zippers
- Stabbing Westward
- Stardust
- Static-X
- Staind
- Stereo MCs
- Stone Temple Pilots
- Story of the Year
- Stroke 9
- The Strokes
- Sublime
- Sugar Ray
- The Sugarcubes
- The Sundays
- Superdrag
- Matthew Sweet
- System of a Down

=== T ===
- Taproot
- Teenage Fanclub
- Temple of the Dog
- Terror Squad
- They Might Be Giants
- Carl Thomas
- Thunder
- Thursday
- Toad the Wet Sprocket
- The Toadies
- The Tomato Can Experience
- Tool
- Travis
- Trik Turner
- Tripping Daisy
- Triumph the Insult Comic Dog
- TRUSTcompany
- Tweet
- Twiztid

=== U ===
- U2
- Urban Dance Squad
- Urge Overkill
- Us3
- Utah Saints

=== V ===
- Veruca Salt
- The Verve
- The Verve Pipe
- The Vines

=== W ===
- The Wallflowers
- Crystal Waters
- Wax
- Weezer
- Kanye West
- The White Stripes
- White Trash
- White Zombie
- Robbie Williams
- Wire
- Andrew W.K.
- World Party

=== X ===
- XTC

=== Y ===
- Yeah Yeah Yeahs
- Pete Yorn
