= No Horses =

Single by Garbage
- Released: July 14, 2017
- Recorded: 2017; California, US
- Length: 5:23
- Label: Stunvolume
- Songwriters: Shirley Manson; Duke Erikson; Steve Marker; Butch Vig
- Producer: Garbage

Garbage singles chronology
"Magnetized" (2016)	"No Horses" (2017)	"Destroying Angels" (2018)

"No Horses" is a 2017 stand-alone single released by the American rock band Garbage, and was recorded and released to coincide with the band's co-headlining Rage and Rapture tour with Blondie, as well as the release of the band's coffee table book This Is the Noise That Keeps Me Awake. At the time, Garbage drummer Butch Vig mooted that "No Horses" could be the lead single for Garbage's seventh studio album. In 2021, "No Horses" would ultimately be included on the deluxe edition bonus disc of that album, No Gods No Masters.

All proceeds from the sales/streams of "No Horses" were donated to the International Committee of the Red Cross until the end of 2018.

== Background ==
The origins of "No Horses" were created from a jam session that had been augmented with noise loops and a Patti Smith-style vocal. "I was driving through the Scottish countryside last year and looking at these fields of horses and thinking, what will happen to them when we don't need them as much as we once did?," Shirley Manson explained. "When they're no longer working beasts, what will happen to the horses? So it's an imagining of the future where the authorities destroy anything that doesn't make large amounts of money." Manson described "No Horses" as a vision of a dystopian future, adding that the song was "more of a piece, rather than a pop song", but that it still sounded like a Garbage track. Part of the instrumental was taken from an unused demo posted as a teaser video by the band in 2011.

Manson would also describe "No Horses" as freeform, noting that the track was less structured than any previous Garbage single. Shirley Manson told Rolling Stone: "It's been my observation that when governments disregard their citizens for their own greed, the ensuing soundtrack usually kicks ass. Like Nina Simone's "Mississippi Goddam" or The Clash’s "Straight to Hell", "No Horses" made me realize that I'm not going insane, these really are fucked up times. The lyrics are powerful so the challenge was to add something visually that wouldn't ruin the individual's interpretation."

On July 5, 2017, "No Horses" was debuted live as the opening song at Garbage's live set in Saratoga, California, and remained on the setlist throughout the Rage and Rapture tour. "We open each show with "No Horses" and every night when we step on stage I get so excited", Manson stated after a few performances, "We get this incredible reaction to it because I think we've touched on something that other people are feeling." "No Horses" returned to the set on occasion during 2018's 20 Years Paranoid tour, and was performed on French television show Quotidien.

== Music video ==
Shirley Manson washes Butch Vig's feet, while the other members of Garbage, Steve Marker and Duke Erikson, look on

In June 2017, Pancake Mountain creator Scott Stuckey directed the visual clip for "No Horses". This is his second clip for the band, following the previous years single "Magnetized" and is influenced by the TV series adaption The Handmaid's Tale. Throughout the video Manson appears in a maroon velvet hood, and in one scene washes Vig's feet in blood, while the rest of the band looks on. This visuals are intercut with stock scenes of the world "literally falling to pieces".

The "No Horses" music video was uploaded to VEVO on August 2, 2017.

== Release history ==
Release history and formats for "No Horses"
Territory	Release date	Record label	Format
Various	July 14, 2017	Stunvolume	Digital release
