= 20 Years Paranoid =

2018 concert tour by Garbage

- Tour by Garbage
- Promotional poster for the tour
- Associated album: Version 2.0
- Start date: September 2, 2018
- End date: November 3, 2018
- Legs: 2
- No. of shows: 15 in Europe; 25 in North America; 40 total

Garbage concert chronology
- Rage and Rapture Tour (2017); 20 Years Paranoid (2018); Garbage & Noel Gallagher's High Flying Birds: Live in Concert (2023)

20 Years Paranoid was a concert tour by American alternative rock group Garbage, to mark the twentieth anniversary of their second album Version 2.0. The title also references the album's second single "I Think I'm Paranoid", and the promotional poster is redolent of the album's orange jacket artwork. The tour was preceded in June by a special 20th anniversary edition of Version 2.0, which was re-mastered in late 2017. Garbage will perform the album in its entirety as well as all the B-sides recorded and released during the album's promotional cycle spanning the years 1998–2000.

== Tour announcement ==
The commemorative tour was initially announced in September 2017 with a single headline show confirmed in London. Further European dates, including a "homecoming" concerts in Glasgow and Edinburgh, and a show at Paris Bataclan, were announced the following February. Before the first shows were announced, Shirley Manson told Variety in mid 2017 that "We’re thinking of doing a Version 2.0 anniversary tour [to mark the album’s 20th anniversary] with all of the album tracks and B-sides, so there will be a lot of songs that we have not even played before that we’ll be trying next year." North American dates were announced in April, with Mexican shows following in July.

Upon the announcement of the tour, Shirley Manson stated: "Version 2.0 was a very significant record for us and we know our fans feel the same way about it too. This should be a very special night for us all". Manson later told Hot Press: "Revisiting the b-sides has been interesting because some of them were literally written in an afternoon and then forgotten about until now. One of them, 'Lick the Pavement' is this un-thought out, un-tampered with burst of energy. There's also a version of Big Star’s 'Thirteen', which Alex Chilton said was his favourite cover of any of his songs. It's not a pat on the head... it's a fucking medal with a garland of flowers beneath it. I mean, Big Star... it doesn't get any cooler than that!"

Garbage preempted the tour with a short set at the Electric Picnic festival in Republic of Ireland on Sunday 2 September. The band preceded Nile Rodgers & Chic, George Ezra, Picture This and The Prodigy. The tour was also supplemented by two festival shows in North America: CalJam in San Bernardino, CA preceding Tenacious D, Iggy Pop with Post Pop Depression and Foo Fighters, and ended their run at the Mother of All Rock Festival in Monterrey, Mexico, preceding Sammy Hagar, Whitesnake and Guns N' Roses.

== Support Acts ==
- Honeyblood (Edinburgh, Glasgow, Bristol, Birmingham)
- The Horrors (Bristol)
- Maxïmo Park (Birmingham)
- Estrons (Manchester, Nottingham, Newcastle)
- Dream Wife (London, European shows)
- Rituals of Mine (United States shows)
- Valerian (Mexican shows)

== Setlists ==
Edinburgh (September 4th, 2018) - Newcastle (September 12th, 2018)

1. "Afterglow"
2. "Deadwood"
3. "Temptation Waits"
4. "Wicked Ways"
5. "Special"
6. "The World Is Not Enough"
7. "13x Forever"
8. "Get Busy With the Fizzy"
9. "Hammering in My Head"
10. "Medication"
11. "Thirteen"
12. "Can't Seem to Make You Mine"
13. "I Think I'm Paranoid"
14. "Sleep Together"
15. "Dumb"
16. "Soldier Through This"
17. "Lick the Pavement"
18. "Push It"
19. "When I Grow Up"
20. "You Look So Fine"
1. "The Trick Is to Keep Breathing"
2. "Starman"
London (September 13th, 2018) - Mexico City (November 1st, 2018)

1. "Afterglow"
2. "Deadwood"
3. "Temptation Waits"
4. "Wicked Ways"
5. "Special"
6. "The World Is Not Enough"
7. "13x Forever"
8. "Get Busy With the Fizzy"
9. "Hammering in My Head"
10. "Medication"
11. "Thirteen"
12. "Can't Seem to Make You Mine"
13. "I Think I'm Paranoid"
14. "Sleep Together"
15. "Dumb"
16. "Soldier Through This"
17. "Lick the Pavement"
18. "Push It"
19. "When I Grow Up"
20. "You Look So Fine"
1. "The Trick Is to Keep Breathing"
2. "No Horses"
3. "Cherry Lips"
Festivals

Electric Picnic

1. "No Horses"
2. "Empty"
3. "I Think I'm Paranoid"
4. "Only Happy When it Rains"
5. "Stupid Girl"
6. "Push It"
7. "Vow"
8. "When I Grow Up"

CalJam 18

1. "I Think I'm Paranoid"
2. "Only Happy When it Rains"
3. "Stupid Girl"
4. "#1 Crush"
5. "Push It"

Mother of All Festival

1. "No Horses"
2. "I Think I'm Paranoid"
3. "Wicked Ways"
4. "Empty"
5. "Dumb"
6. "Stupid Girl"
7. "Why Do You Love Me"
8. "#1 Crush"
9. "Lick the Pavement"
10. "Vow"
11. "Only Happy When it Rains"
12. "Push It"

An orchestral sample, pitch-shifted and slowed down preceded the band onstage, where they opened with b-sides "Afterglow" and "Deadwood". These, alongside "13x Forever", are live debuts on this tour. Album tracks intersperse b-sides throughout, peaking the main set with three of their biggest songs. Deep cuts such as "Wicked Ways", "Medication", "Sleep Together" and "Dumb" had not been performed by the band in almost twenty years. "Wicked Ways" is mashed-up with a section from Depeche Mode's "Personal Jesus", "13x Forever" ends on a part from The Kinks' "Tired of Waiting for You", while "You Look So Fine" features an extended outro of lyrics from Fleetwood Mac's "Dreams". Further into the run Shirley adlibbed from Siouxsie and the Banshees "Happy House" on "Sleep Together". Some of the songs are preceded with pop-cultural reference samples triggered to lead in the music. These include dialogue from movies such as Natural Born Killers, To Have and Have Not, Sex, Lies, and Videotape, 2001: A Space Odyssey, Blade Runner, All About Eve, The Conversation, The Graduate, Eternal Sunshine of a Spotless Mind and The Crow. The encore consists of album centrepiece "The Trick Is to Keep Breathing" and a cover version of David Bowie's "Starman", which was released on November 23, 2018 as b-side of the "Destroying Angels" single.

The band rehearsed around 25 songs for the tour. At both London shows, "Starman" was substituted for "No Horses" and "Cherry Lips", which continued on as the closing songs for the rest of the tour. Some fan requests were taken at points, including Beautiful Garbage tracks "Cup of Coffee" and "Parade". Late into the run, the band performed "#1 Crush" and "Only Happy When it Rains" in lieu of "No Horses".

== Tour dates ==
Date	City	Country	Venue
Europe
September 2, 2018	Stradbally	Republic of Ireland	Electric Picnic
September 4, 2018	Edinburgh	United Kingdom	Edinburgh Festival Theatre
September 5, 2018	Glasgow	United Kingdom	Barrowland Ballroom
September 7, 2018	Bristol	United Kingdom	Ashton Gate Stadium
September 8, 2018	Birmingham	United Kingdom	Digbeth Arena
September 9, 2018	Manchester	United Kingdom	Manchester Academy
September 11, 2018	Nottingham	United Kingdom	Rock City
September 12, 2018	Newcastle	United Kingdom	Northumbria SU Institute
September 14, 2018	London	United Kingdom	O_{2} Brixton Academy
September 15, 2018	London	United Kingdom	O_{2} Brixton Academy
September 17, 2018	Cologne	Germany	E-Werk
September 18, 2018	Berlin	Germany	Huxleys
September 20, 2018	Paris	France	Bataclan
September 22, 2018	Esch-sur-Alzette	Luxembourg	Rockhal
September 23, 2018	Utrecht	Netherlands	TivoliVredenburg
North America
September 29, 2018	Seattle	United States	Showbox SoDo
September 30, 2018	Portland	United States	Roseland Theater
October 2, 2018	Reno	United States	Grand Theatre
October 3, 2018	Oakland	United States	Fox Oakland Theatre
October 5, 2018	Las Vegas	United States	Cosmopolitan of Las Vegas
October 6, 2018	San Bernardino	United States	CalJam
October 7, 2018	Tempe	United States	Marquee Theatre
October 9, 2018	Albuquerque	United States	Sunshine Building
October 11, 2018	Dallas	United States	House of Blues
October 12, 2018	Houston	United States	House of Blues
October 13, 2018	Tulsa	United States	Paradise Cove
October 16, 2018	Madison	United States	The Sylvee
October 17, 2018	Chicago	United States	Riviera Theatre
October 18, 2018	Northfield	United States	Hard Rock Live
October 20, 2018	Port Chester	United States	Capitol Theatre
October 21, 2018	Washington, D.C.	United States	Lincoln Theatre
October 22, 2018	Washington, D.C.	United States	Lincoln Theatre
October 23, 2018	Boston	United States	House of Blues
October 25, 2018	Philadelphia	United States	The Fillmore
October 26, 2018	Atlantic City	United States	Borgata Music Box
October 27, 2018	New York City	United States	Kings Theatre
October 30, 2018	Puebla	Mexico	Auditorio Metropolitano
October 31, 2018	Queretaro	Mexico	Auditorio Josefa Ortiz de Domínguez
November 1, 2018	Mexico City	Mexico	Arena Ciudad de México
November 3, 2018	Monterrey	Mexico	Tecate Mother of all 2018

== Reviews ==
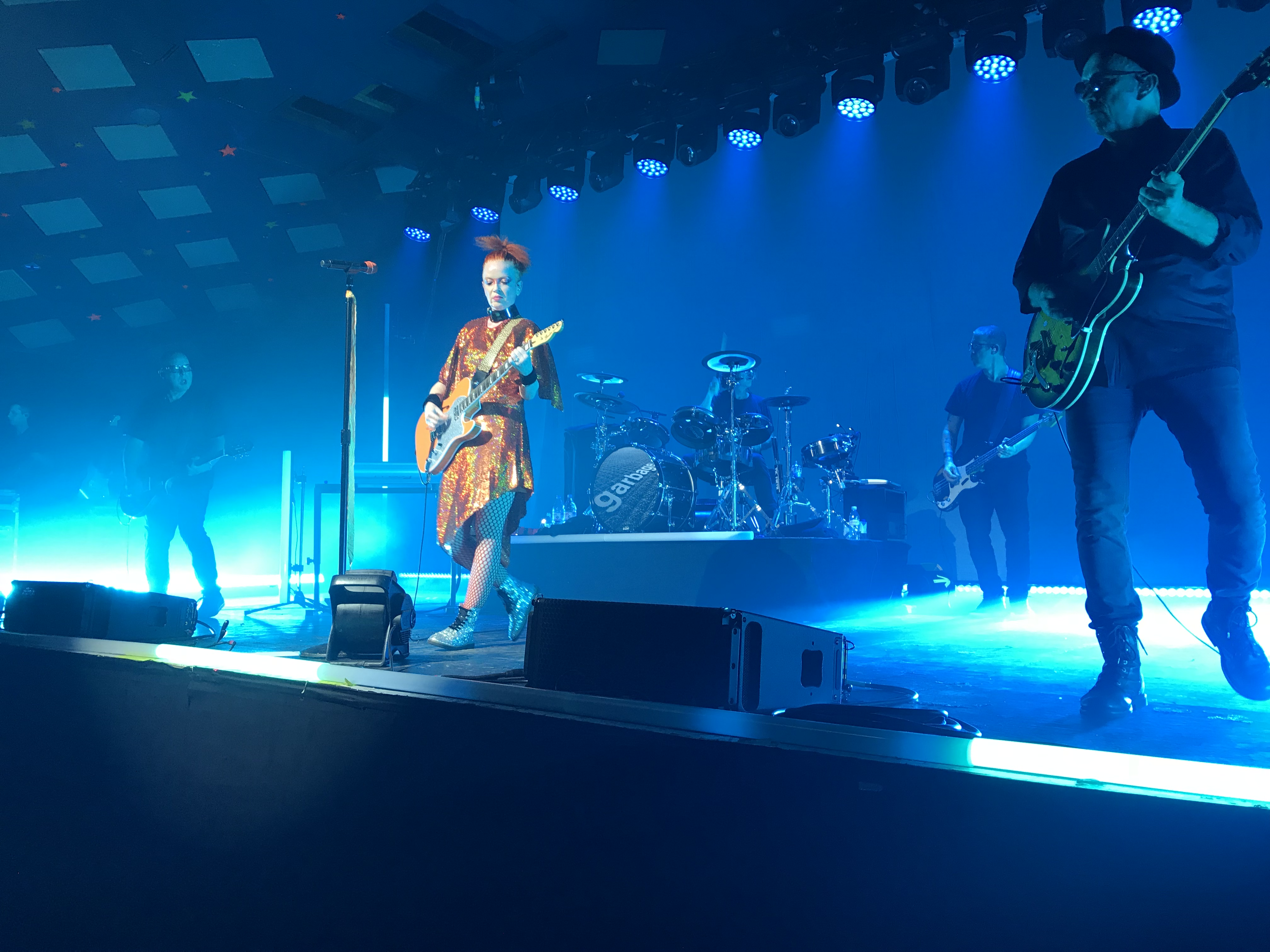
Garbage perform "You Look So Fine" at Glasgow Barrowlands. Shirley Manson quoted lines from the Fleetwood Mac song "Dreams" during the song outro.

The opening night in Edinburgh was slightly marred with some sound issues, which Chris Mackinnon, writing for the Edinburgh Evening News, commented "despite the odd hiccup, it was a fine outing". He also noted, "THIS could be the very definition of risk: A celebration of possibly your most lauded album, in your home-town. On the 1st night of a tour. But it totally paid off."

== Promotional performances ==
Date	Show	Set
September 21, 2018	Quotidien	"I Think I'm Paranoid", "No Horses"
October 16, 2018	Monday Night Football	"Push It"
