= Magnetized (Garbage song) =

Single by Garbage

from the album Strange Little Birds
- Released: October 4, 2016
- Recorded: 2013–2015
- Genre: Electronic rock
- Length: 3:54
- Label: Stunvolume
- Songwriter: Garbage
- Producers: Garbage; Billy Bush

Garbage singles chronology
"Even Though Our Love Is Doomed" (2016)	"Magnetized" (2016)	"No Horses" (2017)

"Magnetized" is a song by American alternative rock band Garbage. It was released as the third single from the band's sixth studio album Strange Little Birds on October 4, 2016, by their independent label Stunvolume.

== Background ==
"Magnetized" is an electronic rock song. Taking one year to complete, "Magnetized" is the song on Strange Little Birds that had the longest gestation. It was initially brought by guitarist Steve Marker who played the chord progression of the song to the band on the same day he wrote "Sometimes." Marker presented a demo which, according to drummer Butch Vig, was "way slower and sounded like the Jesus & Mary Chain on drugs" and had a "Phil Spector beat." Singer Shirley Manson sang the chorus "I'm magnetized" as soon as she heard the demo with "a Roy Orbison melody." The band tried different arrangements with the song, like a "hyped and aggressive" live performance style arrangement and a string section, before resorting to experimenting with the Glamour Box, a stomp box that generates noise. Vig cut the noises samples into pieces to fit into the song and the band came up with the "symphonic sound" on the chorus, "with these fuzzed out, hyper-sounding guitars, and a lot of keyboards," making the song "a lot more orchestral and cinematic and a lot less rock 'n' roll."

== Release and promotion ==
"Magnetized" was released as the third single (Note: "Magnetized" was marketed as the second single from Strange Little Birds by online publications and on Garbage's coffee table book This Is the Noise That Keeps Me Awake. It was however the third track to be used for promoting the album after lead single "Empty" and digital single "Even Though Our Love Is Doomed".) from Strange Little Birds on October 4, 2016. The same day, the music video premiered on Dazed. The single reached No. 41 on the Billboard Mexico Ingles Airplay chart. "Magnetized" made its live debut on September 15, 2016, at the Fillmore Auditorium, Denver, and was performed for the remainder of the Strange Little Birds Tour.

In 2022, the song was remastered by Heba Kadry and included on the band's third greatest hits album Anthology.

== Music video ==
The "Magnetized" music video was directed by Scott Stuckey, Manson's "next door neighbour", who was tasked to make a "50s sci-fi" inspired video. It was filmed on September 2, 2016, at Evidence Film Studios, in Los Angeles. The video represents an "ode to the magic of science and the mysteries of love," featuring examples of electromagnetism with ferrofluid, a Van de Graaf generator and electroshock therapy. As written by Josh Rosenberg on Spin, the video stars Manson as "a cross between a mad scientist and a witch," an 8-year-old girl representing her younger doppelgänger "being turned into some sort of demon child" and "cyclops assistants with iPad-sized screens on their faces". The male members of Garbage make a cameo for a few seconds with clips recorded remotely. For the video, 300,000 volts of electricity were sent through the real Manson and her 8-year old doppelgänger. Stuckey explained that the video "has a scary kind of tone to it. We were releasing it around Halloween. And I always find little kids creepy, so we thought having a little Shirley Manson might be creepy as hell." Originally, a universe with Manson standing in the center of a galaxy was built but no scene of it was used in the final video.

A behind-the-scenes of the video was uploaded by Pancake Mountain on their YouTube channel on October 28. Another making of the video featuring Stuckey was posted by Evidence Film Studios on June 16, 2018.

Manson later commented "it looks like a Kubrick movie, I think. But [Stuckey] made it literally on a shoestring. [...] It's a phenomenal feat of creativity," while guitarist Duke Erikson added it reminded him of the "Push It" video.

== Critical reception ==
Dannii Leivers for The Line of Best Fit complimented the track's sound saying the song "could have happily slotted onto their second, and also great, album Version 2.0" while Josh Rosenberg on Spin defined the track as "anthemic". ABC News' Allan Raible picked the song as one of the standouts on the album and wrote it "add[s] fire to their signature sound." Sal Cinquemani in his review on Slant Magazine also likened the song to Garbage's previous material, writing that the "raucous hook [of the song] is quintessential Garbage", while pointing out that "the track’s overt references to 10CC’s “I’m Not In Love” makes one wonder what it would sound like if the band took a more headlong dive into synth-based soft rock." In his review for Major Hifi, Carroll Moore reflected on the moody lyrics, writing "while things might seem to brighten up a tad in “Magnetized,” with a chorus that seems straight out of 2016’s next big rom-com, the opening lines keep any mistaken elation in check."

Negative criticism came from Paul Sinclair of Super Deluxe Edition, who wrote the song "does the quiet-verse, loud-chorus thing to good effect, but can’t pull itself out of the mire of averageness" and pointed out that "Johnny Hates Jazz wrote a better song with the same title back in 2013."

== Charts ==
Chart performance for "Magnetized"
Chart (2016)	Peak position
Mexico Ingles Airplay (Billboard)	41
