= This Is the Noise That Keeps Me Awake =

2017 autobiography by Garbage and Jason Cohen

- Hardcover edition
- Author: Garbage and Jason Cohen
- Cover artist: Ryan Corey
- Language: English
- Genre: Memoir
- Publisher: Akashic Books
- Publication date: June 16, 2017 (limited edition); July 4, 2017 (standard edition)
- Publication place: United States
- Media type: Print (Hardcover)
- Pages: 208
- ISBN: 978-1-61775-550-7

This Is the Noise That Keeps Me Awake is a 2017 autobiography by American alternative rock band Garbage with journalist and former Rolling Stone contributor Jason Cohen. The title comes from the lyric of their 1998 single "Push It".

Published by Akashic Books, the first edition is a large-format coffee table book bound with an embossed cloth hardcover and finished with a dust jacket. The edges of the text pages, printed on matte art paper, are finished in pink. The book includes original pieces from all four members of Garbage: Shirley Manson, Butch Vig, Duke Erikson and Steve Marker, and incorporates previously unpublished photographs and personal snapshots.

This Is the Noise That Keeps Me Awake was available to pre-order in several formats. The limited edition bundle includes a hardcover copy of the book, a custom collectable box and a 12-inch vinyl extended play featuring six previously unreleased live recordings, one from each of the band's first six studio albums. The first 1,000 units were signed by the band. The release of the book was accompanied by a new single release, "No Horses", and the band co-headlining a tour with Blondie.

== Bonus 12" EP ==
Side A
No.	Title	Length
1.	"Milk" (original version on Garbage (1995))	4:20
2.	"You Look So Fine" (original version on Version 2.0 (1998))	7:03
3.	"Cup of Coffee" (original version on Beautiful Garbage (2001))	4:15

Side B
No.	Title	Length
4.	"Bleed Like Me" (original version on Bleed Like Me (2005))	4:24
5.	"Beloved Freak" (original version on Not Your Kind of People (2012))	4:24
6.	"Even Though Our Love Is Doomed" (original version on Strange Little Birds (2016))	5:36

The side A tracks were recorded live at the band's 20 Years Queer tour at Orpheum Theater in Madison, Wisconsin, on October 15, 2015 ("Milk"); and at two Not Your Kind of People World Tour concerts, at the House of Blues in Houston on October 9, 2012 ("You Look So Fine"), and at the Ancienne Belgique in Brussels ("Cup of Coffee") on November 25, 2012. The tracks on side B were all recorded at the band's show at Revention Music Center in Houston on September 6, 2016, as part of the Strange Little Birds Tour.

== Pat Pope controversy ==
In 2015, photographer Pat Pope posted an open letter to Garbage on his Facebook page, alleging that the band's management had approached him for permission to incorporate some of his images without fee, apart from appropriate credit. Pope felt that this was hypocritical on Garbage's part, and declined the use of the images. After the post went viral, and attracted media attention, Manson posted a response to Pope via the band's own Facebook page, stating that they had decided to ask photographers for the use of their images and respect any declined requests. Pope decided to draw a line under the debate that his open letter has started, and explain the reasons for his public refusal. Pope explained that he strongly felt that photography was being devalued by companies asking for work with recompense, or not even bothering gaining permission (Pope only discovered one of his images had been used in the booklet for the band's greatest hits album Absolute Garbage after purchasing a copy and opening the package).
