= Version 2.0: The Official Remixes =

Remix album by Garbage
- Released: July 6, 2018
- Recorded: 1998–1999
- Genre: Alternative rock; electronic
- Length: 101:00
- Label: Stunvolume; Almo Sounds via Interscope
- Producer: Garbage; Boom Boom Satellites; Victor Calderone; The Crystal Method; Jill Stark; Brothers in Rhythm; Danny Tenaglia; Rickidy Raw; Eric Kupper; Fun Lovin' Criminals

Garbage chronology
| Version 2.0 (20th Anniversary Edition) (2018) | Version 2.0: The Official Remixes (2018) | Anthology (2022) |

Version 2.0: The Official Remixes is a remix album by American alternative rock group Garbage. It was released on July 6, 2018, on their own label Stunvolume. The album is made up of sixteen remixes and alternate versions from Garbage's second studio album Version 2.0 and was made available to all digital stores and streaming services. The bundle complements the band's 20th Anniversary re-issue of the Version 2.0 album, and were chosen by the band to bring a new perspective to the album.

== Background ==
The compilations pulls together remixes by Boom Boom Satellites, the Crystal Method, Purity, Rickidy Raw, Eric Kupper and Fun Lovin' Criminals that were originally released on the Version 2.0 CD singles distributed outside of North America, as well as dub versions taken from 12" vinyl promo releases given their first commercial release here. The full length 12" remix of "Special" by Brothers in Rhythm and club mix of "When I Grow Up" by Danny Tenaglia are also presented here commercially for the first time; the original CD singles contained edited versions of these remixes. Two pop radio remixes of these songs also appear, both slightly differing from their original airplay releases (There is no second drop out on the bridge on "Special"; there is a slightly extended outro with an extra lyric on the pop mix of "When I Grow Up"). These were both rearranged by Garbage themselves for North American airplay (alongside a second, more laid back rework of "Special" by Rickidy Raw) and are presented commercially for the first time, as well as for the first time outside of that territory.

== Track listing ==
All tracks are written by Garbage.

Version 2.0: The Official Remixes track listing
| No. | Title | Length |
|---|---|---|
| 1. | "Push It" (Boom Boom Satellites mix) | 6:42 |
| 2. | "Push It" (Victor Calderone Club mix) | 7:19 |
| 3. | "Push It" (Victor Calderone Dub mix) | 3:41 |
| 4. | "I Think I'm Crystalized" (The Crystal Method Extended edit) | 7:26 |
| 5. | "I Think I'm Crystalized" (The Crystal Method Dub mix) | 5:17 |
| 6. | "I Think I'm Paranoid" (Purity mix) | 5:30 |
| 7. | "Special" (Brothers in Rhythm mix) | 10:00 |
| 8. | "Special" (Pop mix) | 3:39 |
| 9. | "When I Grow Up" (Danny Tenaglia Golden Shower Dub mix) | 9:16 |
| 10. | "When I Grow Up" (Danny Tenaglia Club mix) | 11:07 |
| 11. | "When I Grow Up" (Alternate Pop mix) | 3:35 |
| 12. | "Special" (Rickidy Raw R&B mix) | 3:25 |
| 13. | "Special" (Rickidy Raw Late Night mix) | 4:00 |
| 14. | "You Look So Fine" (Eric Kupper Deep Drama remix) | 8:39 |
| 15. | "You Look So Fine" (Eric Kupper Deep Drama dub mix) | 7:53 |
| 16. | "You Look So Fine" (Fun Lovin' Criminals remix) | 3:39 |

== Release history ==
Release formats for Version 2.0: The Official Remixes
| Date | Territory | Label | Format(s) |
|---|---|---|---|
| July 6, 2018 | Australia and New Zealand | Liberator Music | Digital download/streaming |
| July 6, 2018 | United States and Canada | Almo Sounds/Interscope | Digital download/streaming |
| July 6, 2018 | Rest of World | Stunvolume/PIAS | Digital download/streaming |
