= Destroying Angels (song) =

2018 single by Garbage

Single by Garbage
- B-side: "Starman"
- Released: November 23, 2018
- Recorded: 2018
- Studio: EastWest Studios; Los Angeles, California, US
- Genre: Alternative rock, murder ballad
- Length: 5:01
- Label: Stunvolume / BMG
- Songwriters: Shirley Manson; Duke Erikson; Steve Marker; Butch Vig; John Doe; Exene Cervenka
- Producers: Garbage; John Doe; Evene Cervenka

Garbage singles chronology
"No Horses" (2017)	"Destroying Angels" (2018)	"The Men Who Rule the World" (2021)

"Destroying Angels" is a 2018 stand-alone single released by alternative rock band Garbage with John Doe and Exene Cervenka of the American punk rock band X. The song was written and recorded for 2018's Black Friday Record Store Day event in North America, with a digital release worldwide the following year.

The B-side featured a cover version of David Bowie's "Starman", which had originally been recorded for a Sirius Radio tribute broadcast organised by Howard Stern and Tony Visconti. "We opted for "Starman" because Bowie was the 'Starman' who blew our minds," the band said in a statement.

In 2021, both "Destroying Angels" and "Starman" would be included on the deluxe edition bonus disc of Garbage's seventh album, No Gods No Masters.

== "Destroying Angels" ==
In 2017, John Doe and Exene Cervenka had performed as the opening act for Blondie and Garbage's Rage and Rapture tour of North America. In early 2018, Garbage drafted both into the recording studio to write and produce a new track. Shirley Manson later described "Destroying Angels" as a "murder ballad". Doe performed bass guitar on the song. Violin and accordion was performed by Madison, Wisconsin-based session musician Chris Wagoner, while piano parts were provided by Garbage member Duke Erikson. "Destroying Angels" was engineered and mixed by Billy Bush at Red Razor Sounds in Atwater Village.

The "Destroying Angels" single was pressed to magenta and white 7" vinyl and limited to 3,000 units. Due to label restrictions, this single was only distributed within North America. The single artwork incorporates an engraving by Henry Adlard, which was published in Eliza Cook's 1840 book Melaia; and Other Poems accompanying a piece titled "The Mourners". On January 4, 2019, the digital version of the single was released worldwide.

On May 22, 2020, John Doe performed a folk arrangement of "Destroying Angels" acoustically as part of an hour long live-stream to benefit the Health Alliance for Austin Musicians organisation. In 2022, Doe released a studio version of his arrangement of "Destroying Angels" on his album Fables in a Foreign Land.

== "Starman" ==
Long-time fans of David Bowie, Garbage had been sound-checking both "Starman" and "Wild Is the Wind" live on their Strange Little Birds tour. "We opted for "Starman" because Bowie was the ‘Starman’ who blew our minds," recalled the band later. "Starman" was recorded at Red Razor Sounds and GrungeIsDead, Butch Vig's home-studio overlooking Silverlake, near Atwater, Wisconsin.

The Howard Stern Tribute to David Bowie broadcast on February 9, 2018. As one of the first musical artists that Howard Stern had gotten into, he explained "[Bowie] was always evolving, he was always on top of things, he was just a great musician and a great songwriter and a great singer. I want to make sure that people remember David Bowie." Bowie producer and friend Tony Visconti added: "“David Bowie’s lasting influence on music, past, present, and future is absolutely phenomenal. He will be played a hundred years from now... I’m glad we can share these fantastic interpretations of his songs. The people who rose to the occasion for the Howard Stern tribute did an amazing job." As well as Garbage, twenty-four other artists submitted cover versions, including Lisa Loeb, Biffy Clyro and Billy Corgan.

On September 4, 2018, "Starman" was debuted live in Edinburgh, Scotland and was the set-closer for the first seven 20 Years Paranoid dates, before it was replaced by "No Horses" and "Cherry Lips" for the remainder of the tour.

== Track listings ==
- US 7" single (Black Friday Record Store Day edition)
1. "Destroying Angels" – 5:01
2. "Starman" – 4:08
- Digital single
1. "Destroying Angels" – 5:01
2. "Starman" – 4:08

== Release history ==
Release history and formats for "Destroying Angels"
Region	Release date	Record label	Format
North America	November 23, 2018	Stunvolume / BMG	7" vinyl (Record Store Day)
Various	January 4, 2019	Stunvolume / PIAS	Digital release
