= Even Though Our Love Is Doomed =

Single by Garbage

from the album Strange Little Birds
- Released: May 27, 2016
- Recorded: 2013–2015
- Length: 5:26
- Label: Stunvolume
- Songwriter: Garbage
- Producers: Garbage; Billy Bush

Garbage singles chronology
"Empty" (2016)	"Even Though Our Love Is Doomed" (2016)	"Magnetized" (2016)

"Even Though Our Love Is Doomed" is a song by American alternative rock band Garbage. It was released as the second single from the band's sixth studio album Strange Little Birds on May 27, 2016, by their independent label Stunvolume.

== Background and composition ==
"Even Though Our Love Is Doomed" is a ballad with electronic elements. The song begins with a bass line, around which the entire track was built by drummer Butch Vig, before climaxing into the distorted outro.

Vig initially came up with the song's title while driving on the 101 and wrote the melody and some words for the chorus. He recorded a few demos of it at home but didn't play them to the rest of the band as he didn't like them. A month later, singer Shirley Manson, who loved the title, asked about the track and suggested Vig to record something simple. The next day, he wrote the entire song on bass guitar in 45 minutes in his home studio Grunge is Dead. After Manson had heard the track once, she fell in love with it and sang on it. The song went through a process of layering by the rest of the band, with bigger drums and more parts being added by guitarists Duke Erikson and Steve Marker, before being stripped down to its final version, which is close to the original demo. "There was something about it that had a spontaneity or intensity to it because it feels like it’s holding back,” Vig explained. The first take of the vocals was used in the final track. Engineer and producer Billy Bush was tasked by Manson to "make the Telefunken [ELA M251] sound like a 58" on the track, which he did through equalization on Logic.

Lyrically, Vig explained "the song is about how dysfunctional relationships can be and how complex they can be, but no matter how difficult they get you know in the back of your head there's still something worth fighting for and retaining. And sometimes you have to remind yourself that." The lyric of the second verse "Such strange little birds / devoured by our obsession" gave the title to the album on which the song is featured. Manson expanded on the album title, explaining that "it's a perfect universal title for how we all as human beings look at each other and we all seem so strange to one another. And, you know, we're living in really chaotic times right now because of this very issue."

In various instances, Garbage named the track "the heart of the record".

== Release and promotion ==
"Even Though Our Love Is Doomed" was released as the second single from Strange Little Birds following "Empty" on May 27, 2016. The band uploaded a lyric video on their YouTube channel with scenes of big cats chasing prey in the wild as well as images of predators attacking each other. A live performance recorded at EastWest Studios was uploaded to the band's channel on June 29.

On June 16, 2017, the limited edition of the band's coffee table book This Is the Noise That Keeps Me Awake was released featuring a 12" EP containing a live performance of the song recorded at the band's show at Revention Music Center in Houston on September 6, 2016.

In 2022, the song was remastered by Heba Kadry and included in Garbage's third greatest hits album Anthology, out October 28.

== Reception ==
Jordan Blum of PopMatters singled it out as "the highlight of the full-length, as well as one of the best compositions Garbage has ever crafted", defining the lyrics as "captivating" and the arrangement as "wonderfully chameleonic and mysterious". Zenae Zukowski of Cryptic Rock defined the song as "another compelling piece where the music captures the moment of a relationship dwindling apart". In her 7.0/10 review on Pitchfork, Zoe Camp wrote "on the funereal choruses [of the song], Manson soberly proclaims the song’s titular sentiment to deliver a message of hope, not fear."
