= The Candy Band =

American punk-rock group for children

The Candy Band is a punk rock band designed specifically to appeal to children. It is composed of four Detroit area moms who were tired of what they deemed wimpy music for kids. Paula Messner sang for Vertical Pillows in the 1980s and then with Motor Dolls. She decided to find three other stay-at-home moms to form a band. In 2003 they formed The Candy Band, playing punk covers of nursery rhymes, movie themes and other children's favorites, along with original tunes.

== Media attention ==
With influences including the Ramones and Iggy Pop, they instantly attracted attention from The Wall Street Journal, the New York Post, The Times, Blender, XM Radio, Woman's Day, USA Today, People, The Early Show, and The Today Show.

== Performances ==
The band performed at schools, festivals, libraries, and sometimes at a bar. They were on Washington, D.C.'s Pancake Mountain TV show, they were part of the Vans Warped Tour and they played the "Kidzapalooza" stage at Chicago's Lollapalooza festival in 2005, 2006, 2007 and 2010. They have both performed and recorded with the Detroit Symphony Civic Youth Orchestra and they appeared regularly at the Detroit Zoo.

== Albums ==
Their first album, Candy Band, was released in 2003. It was followed by More Candy in 2004, Lollipunk in 2005, and Calling All Kids in 2007. Their fifth album, High Five, was recorded in 2009 at Rustbelt Studios, with engineer Al Sutton.
