= Empty (Garbage song) =

Single by Garbage

from the album Strange Little Birds
- Released: April 20, 2016
- Recorded: 2013–2015; Grunge Is Dead; Red Razor Sounds, Los Angeles, United States
- Genre: Electronic rock
- Length: 3:54
- Label: Stunvolume
- Songwriters: Duke Erikson; Shirley Manson; Steve Marker; Butch Vig
- Producer: Garbage

Garbage singles chronology
| "The Chemicals" (2015) | "Empty" (2016) | "Even Though Our Love Is Doomed" (2016) |

"Empty" is a song by American alternative rock band Garbage. It was released as the lead single from their sixth studio album Strange Little Birds (2016) on April 20, 2016, by their independent label Stunvolume.

== Background ==
"Empty" is an electronic rock song. Drummer Butch Vig said "it sets the tone for the rest of the album" and added it sounds "like classic Garbage," a sentiment which touring bassist Eric Avery also shared. Guitarist Steve Marker echoed that, saying that the song's position as second track on Strange Little Birds following the more eerie and atmospheric "Sometimes" was a deliberate choice due to the band wanting to create a heavy contrast between the tracks and give an idea of what to expect from the rest of the record.

Singer Shirley Manson explained that the song is about "the hole that we all have - [...] I think every human being has it, somewhere, or at least, at some point in their life - where you're so eaten up with an obsession that fills you up so completely there's no room for anything else. And as a result, you just have this sort of psychopathic approach in your life. We've become so obsessed with money, and success, and numbers and we're forgetting about our humanity in the midst of all that." Vig added that despite having "pretty dark lyrics", the song's anthemic sound makes it feel "like a celebration" of vulnerability as Manson acknowledges it singing "I'm so empty" in the chorus.

== Release and promotion ==
"Empty" was released as lead single from Strange Little Birds on April 20, 2016. It was debuted on the Kevin & Bean show on KROQ. The music video followed on May 23 and was uploaded on the band's YouTube channel through VEVO.

Garbage performed the song on the French TV show C à vous on May 25 and on Jimmy Kimmel Live! on June 20 to promote the record. A live performance filmed at East West Studios was uploaded by Amazon UK as part of Amazon Front Row on June 3; it was later uploaded on the band's YouTube channel on June 29.

In 2022, the song was remastered by Heba Kadry and included in Garbage's third greatest hits album Anthology, out October 28.

== Music video ==
The promotional video for "Empty" was helmed by Samuel Bayer, who also directed the first Garbage videos from their debut album. The video shows each member of the band playing in an empty room alone on a platform with various flashing colored light effects as well as confetti occasionally raining down from the ceiling. There are many instances where the camera is spinning in a circle around Manson and occasionally the other band members. Manson claims Bayer borrowed the camera from NASA, and the camera "nearly killed Butch" as it detached from its rotating axis while Vig was playing drums in the room.

An alternate cut of the video was uploaded by video editor Michael Mees on his website.

== Charts ==
Chart performance for "Empty"
| Chart (2016) | Peak position |
|---|---|
| US Alternative Airplay (Billboard) | 39 |
