= Rage and Rapture Tour =

2017 concert tour by Blondie and Garbage

- Tour by Blondie and Garbage
- Promotional poster
- Location: North America
- Associated album: Pollinator; Strange Little Birds
- Start date: July 5, 2017
- End date: August 14, 2017
- No. of shows: 27
Blondie tour chronology
Pollinator Tour (2017)	Rage and Rapture Tour (2017)	Against the Odds Tour (2022)
Garbage tour chronology
Strange Little Birds tour (2016)	Rage and Rapture Tour (2017)	20 Years Paranoid (2018)

The Rage and Rapture Tour was a co-headlining concert tour by American new wave band Blondie and American rock band Garbage. It was launched in support of Blondie's eleventh studio album, Pollinator (2017), and Garbage's sixth studio album, Strange Little Birds (2016). The tour began on July 5, 2017, at the Mountain Winery in Saratoga, California. Support on the tour was provided by Sky Ferreira in Los Angeles, while John Doe and Exene Cervenka opened the first half of the tour, and Deap Vally opened the second leg.

== Critical reception ==
Fred Schruers from Billboard described Deborah Harry, Shirley Manson and Sky Ferreria in the Los Angeles concert that "...all three epitomized a kind of sass and surety that indeed found a way to blend rage and rapture in a congenial package." Sarah Grant from Rolling Stone described Garbage's set in the New York City concert as "Social issues were the undercurrent of Garbage’s set. Manson dedicated 2001's "Cherry Lips" to the LGBTQ community, a thread continuing into "Sex Is Not the Enemy" and "Queer" wherein Manson's fulsome purr sounded like Michael Hutchence with strep throat."

== Tour dates ==
List of 2017 concerts
Date	City	Country	Venue
July 5, 2017	Saratoga	United States	Mountain Winery
July 7, 2017	Santa Barbara	United States	Santa Barbara Bowl
July 8, 2017	Las Vegas	United States	The Pearl Concert Theater
July 9, 2017	Los Angeles	United States	Hollywood Bowl
July 12, 2017	Troutdale	United States	Edgefield
July 13, 2017	Woodinville	United States	Chateau Ste. Michelle Winery
July 14, 2017	Nampa	United States	Ford Idaho Center
July 16, 2017	Greenwood Village	United States	Fiddler's Green Amphitheatre
July 18, 2017	Kansas City	United States	Kauffman Center for the Performing Arts
July 19, 2017	Council Bluffs	United States	Harrah's Council Bluffs
July 21, 2017	Prior Lake	United States	Mystic Lake Casino Hotel
July 22, 2017	Highland Park	United States	Ravinia Festival
July 25, 2017	Lewiston	United States	Earl W. Brydges Artpark State Park
July 26, 2017	Toronto	Canada	Sony Centre for the Performing Arts
July 28, 2017	Red Bank	United States	Count Basie Theatre
July 29, 2017	Bethel	United States	Bethel Woods Center for the Arts
July 30, 2017	Boston	United States	Leader Bank Pavilion
August 1, 2017	New York City	United States	Beacon Theatre
August 2, 2017	Philadelphia	United States	Mann Center for the Performing Arts
August 3, 2017	Vienna	United States	Wolf Trap
August 5, 2017	Raleigh	United States	Red Hat Amphitheater
August 6, 2017	Atlanta	United States	Chastain Park
August 8, 2017	Hollywood	United States	Seminole Hard Rock Hotel and Casino Hollywood
August 9, 2017	Orlando	United States	Hard Rock Live
August 11, 2017	Austin	United States	ACL Live at the Moody Theater
August 12, 2017	Dallas	United States	Southside Ballroom
August 14, 2017	Mexico City	Mexico	Palacio de los Deportes
