= The Trick Is to Keep Breathing =

1999 single by Garbage

Single by Garbage

from the album Version 2.0
- B-side: "Can't Seem to Make You Mine"; "Tornado"
- Released: February 15, 1999
- Recorded: March 1997 – February 1998
- Studio: Smart Studios, Madison, Wisconsin
- Length: 4:11
- Label: BMG/Mushroom Records UK
- Songwriter: Garbage
- Producer: Garbage

Garbage singles chronology
"When I Grow Up" (1999)	"The Trick Is to Keep Breathing" (1999)	"You Look So Fine" (1999)

"The Trick Is to Keep Breathing" is a song by Garbage, released as the joint-fourth single from their platinum second album Version 2.0. The single was released in a number of European countries including Germany, Austria, Italy, Portugal and Greece. The single was released simultaneously alongside "When I Grow Up", which was issued in other European territories including the United Kingdom, Ireland, Spain and across Scandinavia; both singles used to promote Garbage's European arena tour.

"The Trick Is to Keep Breathing" was written and recorded by Garbage at their own recording studio in Madison, Wisconsin throughout 1997. Vocalist Shirley Manson used the title of Scottish author Janice Galloway's 1989 novel of the same name.

== Song profile ==
The basis of "The Trick Is to Keep Breathing" was conceived by Garbage in March 1997, whilst they were staying at a friend's house on Friday Harbor, San Juan Island, Washington, where they spent time jamming to come up with material for their second album. Shirley Manson: "The boys were playing some of the chords, and the lyrics just came out in like two minutes. I've never had to review them really. They were perfect the way they were, and that never happened to me before." "The Trick Is to Keep Breathing" started out "very simple", however over time there was a lot more recorded for it. When the band mixed the song, they made it "a lot more moody and spare". Shirley added "It's that general feeling of just keep pushing and you'll get through it. I think everybody can connect with that feeling".

== Single release ==
"The Trick Is to Keep Breathing" was first considered as a potential single from Version 2.0 prior to the release of the album. After the third single release, "Special", Garbage's European distributor BMG chose "...Keep Breathing" as the follow-up for some of its territories.

Preempting the single release, Garbage debuted "...Keep Breathing" live on October 19, 1998 at USF Special Events Center in Tampa, Florida BMG sent a radio edit of the track to radio stations across Europe on January 7, 1999, six weeks in advance of the release date. The airplay and release of the single would coincide Garbage's return to the UK & Europe on their Version 2.0 tour; MTV Europe recorded the band's live show at The Zenith Arena in Paris, France on January 27 to be broadcast as a five-song MTV Live special. The recording included the band's performance of "The Trick is To Keep Breathing" from that night and was broadcast on MTV networks worldwide, from April 1. The following night from the Zenith show, Garbage performed "The Trick Is To Keep Breathing" and "Special" acoustically on French Canal+ television show Nulle Part Ailleurs. After the performance, Garbage were presented with gold discs for their French record sales.

BMG released "The Trick Is to Keep Breathing" in Germany on February 15, 1999 on a CD maxi format which contained the B-sides "Tornado", a cover version of The Seeds' 1965 single "Can't Seem to Make You Mine" and an urban radio remix of "Special" by production duo Rickidy Raw. "...Keep Breathing" sold over 10,000 copies, making it the biggest selling German single of the Version 2.0 campaign. Version 2.0 re-entered the German album charts during the lifespan of the single. In Greece, music channel MAD TV heavily supported "The Trick Is to Keep Breathing", where the video reached #1 on their station chart.

Garbage continued to perform "The Trick Is to Keep Breathing" for the remainder of the year, until its last performance on October 3, 1999 at The Palace in Melbourne, Australia. An episode of One Tree Hill was named after the song. In 2000, "...Keep Breathing" featured on the soundtrack of the Bollywood movie Split Wide Open.

== Track listings ==
- European CD single BMG 74321 63577 2
1. "The Trick Is to Keep Breathing" - 4:11
2. "Can't Seem to Make You Mine" - 2:55
- European CD maxi BMG 74321 64576 2
1. "The Trick Is to Keep Breathing" - 4:11
2. "Can't Seem to Make You Mine" - 2:55
3. "Tornado" - 3:44
4. "Special - Rickidy Raw Mix" - 3:25

== Music video ==
Shirley Manson performing onstage in the "...Keep Breathing" video.

The music video for "The Trick is To Keep Breathing" was shot onstage at three Garbage concerts by Sophie Muller for Oil Factory during the band's Fall 98 North American tour. Muller recorded live footage of the band over three nights, beginning on November 17 at the Egyptian Theater in Indianapolis, Indiana. Footage was also shot at concerts performed at the Dane County Expo Center in Madison, Wisconsin on Nov 18; and at the Memorial Hall in Kansas City on Nov 20. Muller also shot footage for a live video for "When I Grow Up" over the same performances. Both music videos were ready to air on December 3, 1998. Like "When I Grow Up", the video is a live performance video; the video differs in that instead of showing a live show frenzy on screen, the video is more subdued and moody, with cool blue and green hues lighting the stage as the band perform. Much of the video was shot in slow-motion.

== Charts ==
Chart performance for "The Trick Is to Keep Breathing"
Chart (1999)	Peak position
Germany Airplay (Media Control GfK)	102

== Release history ==
Release history and formats for "The Trick Is to Keep Breathing"
Territory	Release date	Record label	Format
Europe	January 7, 1999	BMG	Airplay
Germany	February 15, 1999	BMG	CD maxi, CD single
