= When I Grow Up (Garbage song) =

1999 single by Garbage

Single by Garbage

from the album Version 2.0
- B-side: "Can't Seem to Make You Mine"; "Tornado"
- Released: January 25, 1999
- Recorded: March 1997 – February 1998
- Studio: Smart Studios, Madison, Wisconsin
- Genre: Alternative rock, power pop
- Length: 3:24
- Label: Mushroom Records UK; Almo Sounds (North America)
- Songwriter: Garbage
- Producer: Garbage

Garbage singles chronology
"Special" (1998)	"When I Grow Up" (1999)	"The Trick Is to Keep Breathing" (1999)

"When I Grow Up" is a 1998 song written, recorded and produced by alternative rock band Garbage. The song was released as the fourth international single to be taken from the band's multi-platinum second album Version 2.0 over the course of the following year.

"When I Grow Up" was the first split-single release in Europe for Garbage, in some countries, "The Trick Is to Keep Breathing" was released in its place. "When I Grow Up" proved to be a charting hit in both United Kingdom and Spain, before going on to become Garbage's most successful single release in Australia and New Zealand at that point in their career.

In North America, "When I Grow Up" served as one of two singles (along with Sheryl Crow's cover version of "Sweet Child o' Mine") released from the soundtrack of the Adam Sandler comedy film Big Daddy.

The song is featured extensively in (and plot-important to) the fifth and final season of Warehouse 13.

== Composition ==
"When I Grow Up" was written and recorded at Smart Studios during the 1997 sessions for Version 2.0. For the intro, the band routed a Nord synthesizer through a guitar pedal and distorted the sound in a 48-track ProTools set up. Drummer Butch Vig used three different snare drums, each hit consecutively and each processed (one through a flanger, one pitch shifted down and one gated), and made into a loop and matched with the Nord for that opening sequence. The scratchy vinyl record sound came from a Victrola gramophone that belonged to engineer Billy Bush's grandfather. The percolating keyboard parts were created by programming some sounds on a Planet Phatt synth module and running them through a guitar amp, complemented by a harmonic guitar note with a filter pulse applied. All of Shirley's vocal, drum and bass parts (performed by the band's touring bassist Daniel Shulman) were recorded to analogue "to get tape compression", while loops and sound effects were left in ProTools. A MicroLynx deck synchronizer was used to marry the analogue tape and digital audio workstation outputs, while the final mix was printed utilizing two Studer 2" tape machines.

Guitarist Steve Marker credited Garbage front-woman Shirley Manson for coming up with a lot of the "sunny-pop" melodies on the song, explaining "that's something that we've always tried to do - have a dark lyric disguised by a happy pop melody. We like that sort of contradiction and juxtaposition." Lyrically, Manson described "When I Grow Up" as being about "that delirious state of wishing and hoping and dreaming for things, not giving up. There's a great quote by Flaubert where he says, 'Sometimes the forces of the world hold us back for a while, but not for ever' ... ". Manson stated that despite the song dealing with growing up, it actually questions whether adulthood brings maturity ("Even though you're sussed and you're smart and you've worked it all out, you haven't even got the remotest inkling of what it's all about. And you can never hope to") and mocks those who feel that way; "I'm constantly patronised by people who think they're really mature and have their life in order and are really together. That's so small minded." "When I Grow Up" notably snuck the phrase "golden shower(s)" onto daytime radio, of which Manson remained proud of afterwards: "It's our little trojan horse!"

"When I Grow Up" was remastered in 2007 for Garbage's greatest hits album Absolute Garbage and remastered from the original studio tapes in 2018 for Version 2.0 (20th Anniversary Deluxe Edition).

== Single release ==
"When I Grow Up" was released to UK radio stations at the end of 1998 and was A-listed at Radio One, Atlantic 252, XFM and GLR, B-listed at Virgin and playlisted at a further sixty-eight regional radio stations. KISS FM also playlisted the Danny Tenaglia remix. The music video was placed on heavy rotation by both MTV (who sponsored the upcoming tour) and The Box. Import copies of "When I Grow Up" from Europe were sold in a few UK record stores, leading the single to chart early at number 198 on the UK Singles Chart as the band's arena tour kicked off in Ireland and then routed into the United Kingdom. Supported by the tour and airplay for the single, Version 2.0 climbed back into the top forty of the UK Albums Chart. Mushroom Records issued "When I Grow Up" on January 25 as a 2×CD single set and a cassette single. The first CD and the cassette was backed with "Can't Seem to Make You Mine"; the CD also included the Danny Tenaglia remix. The second CD single included "Tornado" and the Rickedy Raw version of "Special". After a week on sale, "When I Grow Up" debuted at number 28 on the Irish Singles Chart, and debuted at number 9 on the UK Singles Chart. This was the band's fifth UK top ten hit. At the end of January, Garbage performed "When I Grow Up" on Friday Night's All Wright, Top of The Pops and Pepsi Chart Show The single received strong radio support and peaked at number 7 in Ireland and at number 17 on the UK airplay chart. On February 1, in the fourth of a series of limited edition 3" CD Garbage singles, this edition for "When I Grow Up", was issued. The same week, the resurgent Version 2.0 album hit number 12. "When I Grow Up" ultimately spent seven weeks in the Top 75.

At the start of January 1999, "When I Grow Up" was serviced to European radio, where it was one of the Most Added titles in its first week. In its third week at radio, "When I Grow Up" peaked at number 34 on the European airplay chart as it debuted at number 39 on the European Hot 100. Buoyed by the release of the single, and tourdates, Version 2.0 recharted and climbed to number 44 on the European Top 100 albums due to strong sales in Belgium, Denmark, Finland, Greece, Spain and Sweden. In February, "When I Grow Up" debuted at number 5 in Spain, peaking at four a week later. At the end of the month, IFPI certified Version 2.0 platinum for one million sales across Europe. Although "The Trick Is to Keep Breathing" was released instead in Germany, after the success of Garbage's James Bond theme "The World Is Not Enough" in (where it reached number 38 on the single sales chart) BMG released "When I Grow Up" as the sixth single from Version 2.0 on March 6, 2000.

"When I Grow Up" was released in North America as Garbage were at the end of a two-month arena tour around the United States opening for Alanis Morissette. A month prior, the Danny Tenaglia remixes had reached nightclubs around the country on import from Europe achieving Hot Dance Breakout status. "When I Grow Up" subsequently debuted on the Hot Dance Music/Club Play chart at #47. By the end of March, third Version 2.0 single "Special" was gaining traction at Top 40 radio, and the song thereafter started climbing the Billboard Hot 100. On March 20, Garbage performed both "Special" and "When I Grow Up" on Saturday Night Live. Almo Sounds serviced "When I Grow Up" to alternative rock radio in the United States on April 12. The song debuted at #40 a week after "Special" left the alternative charts. In May, "When I Grow Up" remixes reached number four on the Club Play chart; and by the first week of June, reached a high of 23 in its sixth week on the Modern Rock chart.

In June 1999, "When I Grow Up" was licensed to the soundtrack of the upcoming Adam Sandler-vehicle Big Daddy. To help promote the movie release, Almo, in partnership with Sony's C2 Records, serviced two new pop radio edits of "When I Grow Up" to Top 40 radio on June 15. A week later, as Almo released a 12" vinyl featuring the Danny Tenaglia mix of "When I Grow Up" and a Brothers In Rhythm mix of "Special" to record stores, a new version of the music video featuring shots from the film premiered on MTV and VH1. Big Daddy opened in North America the weekend of June 25, and debuted at number 1 with a box office take of almost $42 million. After dropping for two weeks, "When I Grow Up" stabilized at number 24 for a fortnight before leaving the Modern Rock chart at the start of August. "When I Grow Up" had spent a total of fifteen weeks on the alternative charts and fourteen on the dance charts.

"When I Grow Up" was released by Festival Mushroom in New Zealand in mid-July on CD (featuring "Can't Seem to Make You Mine", "Tornado" and the Danny Tenaglia remix) and cassette single (featuring only the remix). The single debuted on the RIANZ Singles Chart as the second-highest new entry at number 27 at the end of the month. "When I Grow Up" peaked at 24 two weeks later. The single stayed on the charts for seven weeks before recharting at number 42 at the end of September. Version 2.0 charted in New Zealand for the first time since May on the RIANZ Album chart in mid-September, reaching 26, the same week that Version 2.0 tour reached the country.

In Australia, Festival Mushroom launched a two-week national advertising campaign on Channel Ten to promote the single and the planned limited edition album repackage (Version 2.0 Special Live Edition) which featured a bonus disc of four tracks recorded live at the Roskilde Festival. "When I Grow Up" was released by Festival Mushroom as a CD single on August 2, and debuted the following week as the second-highest new entry at number 22 on the ARIA Charts. The same week, Version 2.0 re-entered the ARIA Albums Chart for the first time in a year. Big Daddy was released to cinemas across Australia on September 16, while Garbage visited the country to perform at Brisbane's Livid Festival and co-headline a tour with Alanis Morissette the following month. On October 9, Garbage appeared on Hey Hey It's Saturday to perform the single. "When I Grow Up" moved back up the charts to number 25 by the end of the month, while the Version 2.0 album surged up to number 8. "When I Grow Up" eventually dropped off the ARIA chart when Garbage released follow-up single "You Look So Fine" on December 6. That single did not make the chart. "When I Grow Up" reappeared at 47 at the end of the month and charted for a final time in mid-January 2000, having clocked up a total of twenty-one weeks. "When I Grow Up" became Garbage's most successful single release in Australia at that point in their career.

== Music video ==
Vocalist Shirley Manson and bassist Daniel Shulman performing "When I Grow Up" onstage in the music video.

The original "When I Grow Up" music video documented the frenzy of a Version 2.0 tour concert. director Sophie Muller shot footage over the course of four Garbage shows over November 17–21, 1998 in Indianapolis, Indiana, St. Louis, Missouri, Kansas City, Kansas, and Madison, Wisconsin, during the band's North American tour. At all of the concerts, the band performed "When I Grow Up" twice, once in the main set and a second time as an encore, to provide enough footage for Muller to utilise. Footage for the music video for "The Trick Is to Keep Breathing" was also filmed by Muller on the same nights. Unlike the special effects-laden videos for their previous three singles, "When I Grow Up" was intended to focus on the performance side of the band. Both videos were ready to air by December 3, 1998, and was broadcast in support of the single releases in United Kingdom, Europe and Australia. A remastered version of the "When I Grow Up" video was included on Garbage's 2007 greatest hits DVD Absolute Garbage and later uploaded to the band's YouTube channel in 2018.

A second music video was directed by Muller in London at the start of June 1999. It was filmed on a stage set backed by lighted replicas of the band's G, Version 2.0 globe and "When I Grow Up" thought balloon logos. Three sequences within the video featured Manson performing choreographed dance moves with two dancers. The second video was filmed to promote Big Daddy in North America; a second edit of the video also incorporated montage footage from the movie. The video premiered on MTV's Total Request Live and VH1 on June 21, 1999. The edit of the "When I Grow Up" video that incorporated footage from the movie was included as a bonus feature on the 2000 Big Daddy DVD.

== Alternate versions ==
For the single release "When I Grow Up" was remixed by Danny Tenaglia; he provided a full club remix and a dub version ("Golden Shower dub"), as well as a short vocal cut ("Shirlapella"). All three mixes were pressed to vinyl for club play in Europe, the full club mix and a radio edit were also serviced to North American DJs. In 2007, an edit of the club mix was included on the Garbage Mixes bonus disc of the Absolute Garbage (Special Edition) two-disc set. Both club and dub mixes were remastered and included on 2018's Version 2.0: The Official Remixes digital album.

Garbage themselves produced a new single version, downplaying the guitar elements and with additional synth, for the North American Top 40 radio release. This mix was serviced in two forms; one ("Pop Mix Main") and the other ("Alt Pop Mix") replaced the lyrics "Happy hours, golden showers" with "Happy lovers, ache for hours" and "Unexpected, unprotected, damn the consequences" with "Unprotected, unexpected, fear the consequences" for radio play. This new version was remastered for Version 2.0: The Official Remixes, however used the standard lyrics, and was cut a few bars longer, and included an extra lyric: "How'd you like it best, you'll let me know".

== Critical reception ==
"When I Grow Up" experienced a mostly positive response from music journalists upon the impact of Version 2.0 and again upon single release. Stephen Jones of Music Week posted a track-by-track review of Version 2.0 as the album campaign launched, where he described "When I Grow Up" as "pure pop in a Strawberry Switchblade vein", and adding that the song was his favourite track. Bradley Bamberger, in his album campaign launch write-up for Billboard, described the song as "a disco-fied girl group essay on teen angst the long-term benefits of a forward-minded attitude". Entertainment Weekly's album reviewer compared the song's "breathy refrain" to '70s/'80s group Blondie, while Paul Brannigan also compared the song to Blondie ["... gone Eurodisco"] in his album review for Kerrang!. In a review for Select, John Harris wrote that "When I Grow Up" was "one of the album's only real troughs", adding that the lyrical matter makes the song sound like "the kind of icky floss they play at the end of California Dreams. Tom Laskin, in his review for Goldmine, noted Manson's "fluffy Kim Wilde delivery" wasn't very interesting, but that it fitted the "buoyant pop setting". In single reviews for Billboard, Chuck Taylor wrote that the song was "edgier, more daring, and lots more fun than the average pop hit", and later described the "Pop Mix" as "an artful slice of bubblegum". Michael Paolettea wrote of the Danny Tenaglia remixes, "with a rubbery bassline, squiggly synth patterns and "Plastic Dreams" inspired drum programming... the song now travels down a road less rocky, but no less energetic".

== Track listings ==
- UK cassette Mushroom MUSH43MCS
1. "When I Grow Up" – 3:24
2. "Can't Seem to Make You Mine" – 2:55
- UK CD1 Mushroom MUSH43CDS
1. "When I Grow Up" – 3:24
2. "Can't Seem to Make You Mine" – 2:55
3. "When I Grow Up" (Danny Tenaglia's Club mix) – 11:08
- UK CD2 Mushroom MUSH43CDSX
1. "When I Grow Up" – 3:24
2. "Tornado" – 3:45
3. "Special" (Rickidy Raw's R+B mix) – 3:25
- UK 3" CD Mushroom MUSH43CDSXXX
1. "When I Grow Up" – 3:24
2. "Can't Seem to Make You Mine" – 2:55
3. "Tornado" – 3:45
4. "When I Grow Up" (Danny Tenaglia's Club mix) – 11:08
- American 12" single Almo Sounds AMS12-88007
1. "When I Grow Up" (Danny Tenaglia's Club mix) – 11:08
2. "Special" (Brothers in Rhythm mix) – 7:24
3. "When I Grow Up" (Danny Tenaglia's Club mix edit) – 4:00
- Australia CD maxi Festival MUSH01863.2
- Europe CD maxi BMG 74321 63492 2
1. "When I Grow Up" – 3:24
2. "Can't Seem to Make You Mine" – 2:55
3. "Tornado" – 3:45
4. "When I Grow Up" (Danny Tenaglia's Club mix) – 9:59
- Europe CD single BMG 74321 63493 2
1. "When I Grow Up" – 3:24
2. "Can't Seem to Make You Mine" – 2:55

== Charts ==
=== Weekly charts ===
Weekly chart performance for "When I Grow Up"
Chart (1999)	Peak position
Australian Singles Chart (ARIA)	22
European Top 50 Airplay (Music & Media)	34
European Hot 100	39
Irish Airplay (IRMA)	7
Irish Singles Chart (IRMA)	28
New Zealand Singles Chart (RIANZ)	24
Spain (AFYVE)	4
Scotland (Official Charts Company)	6
UK Singles Chart (CIN)	9
UK Indie Singles (CIN)	3
UK Airplay Chart (Music Control)	17
US Hot Modern Rock Tracks (Billboard)	23
US Hot Dance Music/Club Play (Billboard)	4

=== Year-end charts ===
Year-end chart performance for "When I Grow Up"
Chart (1999)	Position
Australia (ARIA)	98

== Release history ==
Release history and formats for "When I Grow Up"
Territory	Release date	Record label	Format(s)
United Kingdom	January 25, 1999	Mushroom Records UK	2×CD single set, cassette single
United Kingdom	February 1, 1999	Mushroom Records UK	3" CD single
United States	April 12, 1999	Almo Sounds	Airplay: Modern rock
United States	June 15, 1999	Almo Sounds / C2 Records	Airplay: CHR/Top 40
United States	June 22, 1999	Almo Sounds	12" vinyl
New Zealand	July 1999	Festival Mushroom Records	CD maxi, cassette single
Australia	July 26, 1999	Festival Mushroom Records	CD maxi
Germany	March 6, 2000	BMG	CD maxi
