= Special (Garbage song) =

1998 single by Garbage

- Standard artwork for European commercial release

Single by Garbage

from the album Version 2.0
- B-side: "13 x Forever"
- Released: October 5, 1998
- Recorded: March 1997 – February 1998
- Studio: Smart (Madison, Wisconsin)
- Genre: Alternative rock; power pop
- Length: 3:44
- Label: Mushroom
- Songwriter: Garbage
- Producer: Garbage

Garbage singles chronology
"I Think I'm Paranoid" (1998)	"Special" (1998)	"When I Grow Up" (1999)

Music video
- "Special" on YouTube

"Special" is a song by American rock band Garbage from their second studio album, Version 2.0 (1998). It was released as the album's third single. The track contains a vocal interpolation of a lyric taken from "Talk of the Town" by the Pretenders.

Commercially, "Special" reached number 15 in the United Kingdom, number 52 on the US Billboard Hot 100, and number 54 in Australia. The song received nominations for Best Rock Song and Best Rock Performance by a Duo or Group at the 2000 Grammy Awards, and winning a Wisconsin Area Music Industry award for Song of the Year and a Citation of Achievement from the BMI Pop Awards. The sci-fi-inspired music video for "Special" also received nominations from music industry award panels, winning a D&AD Award, a MTV Video Music Award, and a VH1 Visionary Video award.

In 2007, "Special" was remastered and included on Garbage's greatest hits album Absolute Garbage.

== Composition and recording ==
Garbage began writing their second album, which would go under the working title of Sad Alcoholic Clowns before being retitled Version 2.0, in March 1997 in the band's label-head Jerry Moss's Friday Harbor, Washington, vacation house. The group demoed and made rough outlines for new songs, of which "Special" was one. When they felt they had made a good start, Garbage took the work they made in Washington back to their Madison, Wisconsin, base at Smart Studios and begin fleshing out the ideas and rough sketches over the following year.

Garbage intended their second album to build upon the framework, music style and musical template laid down by their first release; to create a rapprochement between the "high-tech and low-down, the now sound and of golden memories" and wear musical references to the 1960s, 1970s and 1980s. Garbage recorded all of their work for the second album through a 48-track digital system digitally, direct to hard drives utilizing a 24bit Pro Tools rig.

Garbage employed touring bassist Daniel Shulman to perform electric bass on "Special", which he performed using a Fender Precision Bass run through an Ampeg SVT and then treated with "severe" equalization to achieve a Paul McCartney-esque Höfner sound to the part. The guitar solo intro (which returns at the end of both choruses) was performed on a 12-string Rickenbacker guitar. At the end of the first chorus, Garbage recorded a multi-tracked harmony vocal from Shirley Manson ("I can't think of any latter-day bands where a female is singing those sort of stacked '60's style vocals").

After the initial riff, at the beginning of each verse line, the pronounced word "I" was sung as a sample from the Beatles' "All I've Got to Do" song.

While experimenting with various phrasing over the outro to "Special", group vocalist Shirley Manson ad-libbed "We were the talk of the town" from the refrain of the Pretenders' song "Talk of the Town". The band were keen to keep the lyric, and to circumvent any potential legal problems, Manson contacted Chrissie Hynde by telephone to ask for permission to use the lyric. Hynde agreed to let Garbage use the lyric without even hearing "Special" first (and did not ask for any credit or royalties); Manson felt that she should send Hynde a copy of the song just to be sure, but before she could do so, Hynde sent a fax to Smart Studios giving her written consent. Manson was reluctant to let people think that "Special" was simply a paean to Hynde; her lyrics concerned a friendship Manson had moved on from after her friend had let her down. Manson: "Ultimately it's about those feelings of betrayal you have for people when you set your sights too high and expect too much and how that can lead to disappointment in the end."

== Release and promotion ==
Garbage debuted "Special" live on May 15, 1998, at a concert at Ryan's Ballroom in Combined Locks, Wisconsin, which was the first date of the Version 2.0 World Tour.

In advance of the UK release, Garbage promoted "Special" in early September 1998 with a live performance of the song on TFI Friday, a pre-record of both "Special" and "When I Grow Up" for Pepsi Chart Show, and also performed a three-song set consisting of "Special", "You Look So Fine" and "I Think I'm Paranoid" for broadcast on MTV Europe. Promotional discs and 12-inch remix packs were distributed across Europe from September 21 to nightclubs and DJs, which enabled the featured Brothers in Rhythm remixes to reach number six on the pre-release industry Buzz Chart. "Special" was A-listed at Radio One and XFM and B-listed at Virgin, and also made the playlists of 52 regional radio stations.

"Special" was released by Mushroom Records in the United Kingdom on October 5, 1998, on three formats. The cassette single and first CD single contains the B-side "13 × Forever"; the CD also included a Brothers in Rhythm remix. The second CD single included a newly recorded acoustic version of the Version 2.0 album track "Medication" and a club remix of "Push It" by Victor Calderone. On October 12, "Special" charted at number 15 on the UK Singles Chart. A week after the initial single release, Mushroom issued "Special" in a collectable 3-inch CD single format in blister pack packaging, featuring both B-sides and the Brothers in Rhythm remix of "Special". The 3-inch CD format was deleted after one week on sale. Top of the Pops broadcast the band's earlier pre-record of "Special" to mark its chart position.

Across Europe, BMG issued "Special" on CD maxi and CD single formats in various territories from October 5. Festival Mushroom, having absorbed and folded White Label Records as part of a recent merger of Festival Records and Mushroom Records, released "Special" on a single CD maxi format collecting together the five tracks from the commercial UK release on October 26. "Special" peaked at number 54 on the Australian ARIA Singles Chart, and spent six weeks in the top 100.

Unlike Garbage's previous single, "I Think I'm Paranoid", the release of "Special" throughout Europe occurred when Garbage were not performing locally, the band having launched the three-month-long North American fall leg of their Version 2.0 World Tour in Denver, Colorado on September 15. As the tour progressed, "Special" was added to Modern Rock radio stations across North America on October 12, while remixes produced by Rickidy Raw were serviced to urban radio. "Special" debuted on the Modern Rock Tracks chart at number 40 on October 31. Garbage performed "Special" on Late Show with David Letterman on October 29, and the following day promoted the single on The Howard Stern Show (but performed their 1997 single "#1 Crush" instead of "Special"). As the tour reached Canada, Garbage performed an extended set of tracks, including "Special" for a MusiquePlus televised performance filmed in Montreal on November 14, before returning to the US to wrap up the run of headline dates on November 28 in Green Bay, Wisconsin. The following day, Garbage immediately set out to promote Version 2.0 and "Special" on a month-long radio show circuit starting at Madison's WMAD for Modern Rock Live and on for a further twelve US radio shows; Garbage also performed "Special" live on The Tonight Show on December 11. December 20 marked the final radio show in Detroit. Imports of "Special" from Europe made enough dance club playlists by the end of 1998 that the song reached number three on Billboard's Hot Dance Breakouts list on December 25; "Special" subsequently made its debut on the Hot Dance Music/Club Play chart dated January 9, 1999, at number 44.

On January 4, 1999, "Special" was serviced to Top 40 radio stations in a new alternate mix for airplay. This second push of "Special" dovetailed with the announcement of nominations for the 41st Annual Grammy Awards on January 6; Version 2.0 was nominated for both Album of the Year and Best Rock Album. On January 26, "Special" was declared "#1 Most Added" track at Top 40 radio with 53 adds, beating out Whitney Houston's "It's Not Right but It's Okay". "Special" peaked at number 11 on the Modern Rock Tracks chart on January 30, 1999, in its 14th week on the chart.

Garbage returned from a sold-out European arena tour (where during a gap in dates they performed both "Special" and "The Trick Is to Keep Breathing" acoustically on French television show Nulle Part Ailleurs) to spend two months supporting Alanis Morissette on her North American Junkie Tour from February 16 in Cincinnati, Ohio.

On March 6, "Special" peaked at number 10 on its ninth week on the Hot Dance Music/Club Play chart, and also debuted at number 35 on the Hot Adult Top 40 chart. The following week, "Special" debuted at number 40 on the Top 40 Mainstream chart. On March 20, during a break in the Junkie Tour, Garbage performed both "Special" and "When I Grow Up" as that week's musical guests on entertainment show Saturday Night Live. On March 27, "Special" debuted at numbers 88 and 71 on the Billboard Hot 100 and the Hot 100 Airplay charts, respectively. Garbage continued to promote the single on the talk shows Charlie Rose and The Late Late Show, and return to The Tonight Show to perform "Special" for a second time on April 2.

"Special" continued to ride high in the mainstream charts throughout May 1999; peaking at number 16 on the Hot Adult Top 40 issue dated May 8 (in its tenth week on that chart); and peaking for three weeks from the same date at number 18 on the Top 40 Mainstream chart. "Special" peaked at number 22 on the Top 40 Tracks chart seven days later. During the week of May 22, "Special" reached its peak position on both the Hot 100 (at number 52, in its ninth week of 13) and on the Hot 100 Airplay chart (at number 42, and in its eighth week of 10).

== Music video ==
In the year 3030, Queen Astarte has taken to the skies to defend her once peaceful homeland from the evil lords of Garbania who seek to rule the universe. She has but one last chance to thwart their wicked plan...

— "Special" music video opening crawl

The music video for "Special" was filmed over a four-day shoot in London by director Dawn Shadforth for Black Dog/RSA Films. Shadforth came to Garbage's attention when they viewed her clip for "Beat Goes On" by electronica group All Seeing I. Her innovative storyboard treatment for "Special" highly impressed the band, as her concept was not an obvious idea for a song like "Special".

In her concept for "Special", Shadforth featured the members of Garbage in a dogfight in the skies of an alien world. Before production of the video commenced, Shadforth fashioned four study models of the fighter planes to enable her to plan in advance the shots and edits she needed to tell the storyline. The planes were designed by graphic artists who had worked on visual effects for Lost in Space and Star Wars: Episode I – The Phantom Menace. Each band member was given a personalized plane design, emblazoned with imagery inspired by manga and sci-fi art; while each filmed their parts in a cabin set built upon a gimbal to give realism to the shots. Stylist William Baker, who worked on the video, said, "Dawn wanted to present Shirley Manson as a space-age fighter pilot, with shots showing her sexily manipulating the controls of her craft." (Shadforth later used techniques she used on the "Special" video in her 2001 music video for Kylie Minogue's "Can't Get You Out of My Head".) The video ends with the phrase, highly ominous in context of its story line, "To be continued..." However, Shadforth, as of early July 2016, had formed no known plans for any follow-up videos.

Shirley Manson in the "Special" video

Throughout 1999, the "Special" music video received a number of nominations from industry panels. In April, Garbage were the leading nominee for the MVPA Video Music Awards, with six nominations shared between the videos for "Special" and "Push It". "Special" was nominated for Best Special Effects (to SFX UK). In September, the "Special" video was nominated for Best Art Direction and won the award for Best Special Effects at the 1999 MTV Video Music Awards. In December, the "Special" video won the Visionary Video award at the VH1 Fashion Awards. The "Special" video also won a "silver" Design and Art Direction award for Best Direction in Pop Promo Video and was nominated for a CAD (Creative and Design) Award for Best Special Effects (to Paul Simpson, Stuart Gordon, and Sean Broughton).

The "Special" music video began airing across Europe in mid-September 1998 and premiered on North American music stations on December 6, 1998. A remastered version of the full-length video was included on Garbage's 2007 greatest hits DVD Absolute Garbage, and the original shorter edit made available as a digital download via online music services later the same year. The full length video was made available to North American online music stores in 2010.

== Track listings ==
- UK cassette Mushroom MUSH39MCS
- European CD single BMG 74321 60488 2
1. "Special" – 3:44
2. "13 × Forever" – 3:55
- UK CD1 Mushroom MUSH39CDS
1. "Special" – 3:44
2. "13 × Forever" – 3:55
3. "Special (Brothers in Rhythm mix)" – 7:24
- UK CD2 Mushroom MUSH39CDSX
1. "Special" – 3:44
2. "Medication (Acoustic version)" – 4:13
3. "Push It (Victor Calderone mix)" – 7:18
- UK 3" CD Mushroom MUSH39CDSXXX
- European CD maxi BMG 74321 60487 2
1. "Special" – 3:44
2. "13 × Forever" – 3:55
3. "Medication (Acoustic version)" – 4:13
4. "Special (Brothers in Rhythm mix)" – 7:24
- Australian CD maxi Festival MUSH01827.2
1. "Special" – 3:44
2. "13 × Forever" – 3:55
3. "Medication (Acoustic version)" – 4:13
4. "Special (Brothers in Rhythm mix)" – 7:24
5. "Push It (Victor Calderone mix)" – 7:18

== Credits and personnel ==
Album version

- Music: Garbage
- Lyrics: Garbage
- Produced: Garbage
- Performed & mixed: Garbage
- Engineered: Billy Bush
- Vocals : Shirley Manson
- Guitars : Duke Erikson & Steve Marker
- Drums : Butch Vig
- Additional Bass: Daniel Shulman
- Recorded at Smart Studios, Madison, Wisconsin.

Pop mix

- Remixed: Garbage
- Remixed at Smart Studios, Madison, Wisconsin

Brothers In Rhythm remixes

- Remixed: Brothers In Rhythm (Steve Anderson and Dave Seaman) for DMC Management
- Engineered and Mixed: Alan Bremner at DMC Studio 4

Rickidy Raw remixes

- Remix and additional production: Rickidy Raw Productions (Robert Jazayeri and Sean Mather) for MCT Management

== Charts ==
Chart (1998–1999)	Peak position
Australia (ARIA)	54
Canada Top Singles (RPM)	42
Canada Rock/Alternative (RPM)	24
Europe (European Hot 100 Singles)	70
Iceland (Íslenski Listinn Topp 40)	5
Scottish Singles Sales (Official Charts)	8
Spain (AFYVE)	25
UK Singles (Official Charts)	15
UK Indie (Official Charts)	2
US Billboard Hot 100	52
US Adult Pop Airplay (Billboard)	16
US Alternative Airplay (Billboard)	11
US Dance Club Songs (Billboard)	10
US Pop Airplay (Billboard)	18
US Top 40 Tracks (Billboard)	22

== Release history ==
Region	Date	Format	Label
United Kingdom	September 21, 1998	Airplay; Promotional discs and 12-inch remix packs	Mushroom
United Kingdom	October 5, 1998	CD single; cassette single	Mushroom
Europe	October 5, 1998	CD single; CD maxi single	BMG
United Kingdom	October 12, 1998	3-inch CD single	Mushroom
United States	October 12, 1998	Modern rock radio	Almo Sounds
Australia	October 28, 1998	CD maxi single	Mushroom
United States	January 25, 1999	Contemporary hit radio	Almo Sounds
