= Pancake Mountain =

Children's television show

Pancake Mountain volume 4 DVD cover

Pancake Mountain is a children's television show created by filmmaker Scott Stuckey (of the famous Stuckey's family). Described as an “alt-rock guerrilla kids' dance party, forged in the crucible of Washington, D.C. cable-access television”, it is notable for featuring many punk rock/indie rock musicians. The show is hosted by a goat puppet named Rufus Leaking, superhero Captain Perfect and his slightly more sensible foil Garnett who serve as interviewers and dance-party impresarios. Interviews have included George Clinton, Juliette Lewis, and Chuck Leavell among others.

Anti-Flag performed the theme song on the original 12 DVD episodes.

== History ==
During an interview with CNN correspondent Heidi Collins, Scott Stuckey had this to say about the origin of the name for the show:

... Musician friend, Brendan Canty (ph), had written a song called "Pancake Mountain" and knew I was doing the show, and thought that it would be a good song for the show. And when I listened to it, I was like a name—this—we should name the show that. It was just an amazing song. And so the song kind of came first, then the name.

The majority of the show is filmed in Washington, D.C., and Arlington, Virginia, but the crew has been known to be fond of road trips and appear at such music festivals as SXSW, Bonnaroo, Lollapalooza and the Virgin Fest. Many of the early episodes were partially written with Fugazi frontman Ian MacKaye.

As of 2009 Pancake Mountain had completed twelve episodes and can be seen on public-access television in New York City, Virginia, North Carolina, Florida, Texas, Colorado, and Washington State.

Filming for the show moved to Los Angeles in late 2008. In 2010, Stuckey got a call from director J. J. Abrams, who signed on to produce the show through his production company Bad Robot. Abrams and Stuckey spent a year pitching the show to various networks, but nobody picked it up.

Stuckey recalls "everyone wanted to try and fit us into a specific demographic, but we weren't willing to change the format" so Stuckey and Bad Robot ended their relationship. In 2011, Pancake Mountain decided to stop production.

In April 2014, The New York Times reported that PBS would start licensing new episodes of Pancake Mountain through their online platform, PBS Digital Studios.

The first episode premiered on June 9, 2014. It contained a new version of the original theme song performed by Brody Dalle of The Distillers.

Stuckey stated that PBS had given him and co-producer J.R. Soldano complete creative control of the show, and that had been a deciding factor in bringing the show back.

== Rufus Leaking ==
Rufus Leaking is a fictional character (puppet) who is the star of Pancake Mountain. He was created by director Scott Stuckey and voiced by producer J.R. Soldano. His dialogue was written by both Stuckey and Soldano. The name is taken from Dave Schools, who would use it as an alias when checking into hotels while on tour.

Rufus is most famous for his interviews and sing-along duets with musical performers like The White Stripes and Henry Rollins.

== Performers and special guests ==
Lily Allen, Anti-Flag, Arcade Fire, Lou Barlow, Big Bad Voodoo Daddy, Lewis Black, Bright Eyes, The Buzzcocks, The Candy Band, Vic Chesnutt, George Clinton, Cypress Hill, The Datsuns, Deerhoof, Rick Derringer, Liz Durrett, Eddie Vedder, Elf Power, The Evens, Eyeball Skeleton, Fat Mike from NOFX, Fiery Furnaces, Tim Fite, The Flaming Lips, Franz Ferdinand, The Go! Team, Guster, Billy Idol, Ted Leo, Juliette Lewis, Jason Mraz, Kaiser Chiefs, Kate Pierson of The B-52's, Katy Perry, Kings Of Leon, Lez Zeppelin, Ian MacKaye / The Evens, Shirley Manson, Metric, The Melvins, M.I.A, My Morning Jacket, Nellie McKay, Northern State, Pylon, The Presidents of the United States of America, Psapp, Robert Randolph, Rock Kills Kid, Henry Rollins, Scissor Sisters, Shonen Knife, Steel Pulse, The Subways, Tegan and Sara, Thievery Corporation, Tilly and The Wall, Uncalled 4, The Undertones, The Watson Twins, Craig Wedren, Weird War, The White Stripes, Widespread Panic, Wolfmother, Wreckless Eric, X, Curt Kirkwood, and Gerard Way.

== See also ==
- Chic-a-go-go
- Yo Gabba Gabba!
