= Scott Stuckey =

American filmmaker and record producer

Scott Stuckey (born March 23, 1964) is an American filmmaker and record producer from Washington, D.C. Stuckey is best known as the creator of the television show Pancake Mountain, as well as his work with singer-songwriter Vic Chesnutt.

== Career ==
Stuckey was born in Eastman, Georgia, United States. His mother was an English teacher and father, W. S. Stuckey Jr., a Congressman from Georgia’s 8th district. His grandfather started Stuckey's, a chain of restaurants on the highway. Stuckey grew up in Washington, D.C. He later moved to New York City and studied at Parsons School of Design, but did not complete a degree.

In 1989, he began recording bands at his home studio in Athens, Georgia. Stuckey and Vic Chesnutt became friends and worked on film and music projects that continued up until Chesnutt’s death.

While working on an R.E.M video with director Jem Cohen in the early 1990s Stuckey began to move back to filmmaking. He would go on to direct music videos and documentaries for Thievery Corporation, Widespread Panic, Vic Chesnutt, Bob Mould, Minor Threat, and Garbage.

Through Pancake Mountain he has directed and worked with artists such as Katy Perry, The White Stripes, M.I.A., and Eddie Vedder. As a songwriter Stuckey has written original songs for the show. Many of the contacts he made as a producer/engineer became early guests on Pancake Mountain.

== Work with Pancake Mountain ==
Pancake Mountain was created by Stuckey as an homage to local TV as well as his fondness for DIY community-based art movements like DC's Dischord Records Scene and The Factory. Early music contributions to the show include The Evens, who wrote a song for the first episode of Pancake Mountain. The song "Vowel Movements" was well received by punk audiences, who reviewed the show positively.

In 2009 he found an unlikely fan in producer/director J. J. Abrams who wanted to produce the show. Abrams and Stuckey spent two years pitching the show, without success. In 2011, Stuckey and Abrams decided to cancel the show. The last skit was with Garbage's Shirley Manson and talking dogs. Production halted until June 2014, when PBS Digital Studios premiered new episodes of Pancake Mountain with Stuckey having full creative control.

== Critical response ==
Pancake Mountain was listed as a Critic's Pick in the Los Angeles Times.

CNN's Chuck Roberts credited Stuckey with creating a new genre for television.
