= Strange Little Birds =

Studio album by Garbage
- Released: June 10, 2016
- Recorded: 2013–2015
- Studio: Red Razor (Atwater Village, California); GrungeIsDead (Silver Lake, California) (Note: Additional recording)
- Genre: Alternative rock; electronic rock; industrial rock; trip hop
- Length: 52:41
- Label: Stunvolume
- Producer: Garbage; Billy Bush

Garbage chronology
| The Absolute Collection (2012) | Strange Little Birds (2016) | No Gods No Masters (2021) |

Singles from Strange Little Birds
- 1. "Empty" Released: April 20, 2016; 2. "Even Though Our Love Is Doomed" Released: May 28, 2016; 3. "Magnetized" Released: October 4, 2016

Strange Little Birds is the sixth studio album by American rock band Garbage. It was released on June 10, 2016, through the band's own record label, Stunvolume. It is their second independent album release, and follows 2012's Not Your Kind of People. The album's press release describes Strange Little Birds as "a sweeping, cinematic record of a unified mood: darkness".

Strange Little Birds was preceded by a lead single, "Empty", and supported by an international tour.

== Composition and style ==
Singer Shirley Manson said, "the guiding principle was keeping it fresh, and relying on instinct both lyrically and musically"; "To me, this record, funnily enough, has the most to do with the first record than any of the previous records. It’s getting back to that beginner’s headspace." Manson described Strange Little Birds as a "romantic" record. Manson clarified later, "What I mean by romance, really, is vulnerability. I used to feel so scared, and I think that was why I was so aggressive — but I’m much more willing to admit weaknesses than I was before.” Each song, she says, addresses “different points in my life between me and a person I’ve loved. They’re hot spots in my life, when I was afraid, or vulnerable, or didn’t behave at my best.” Drummer Butch Vig said that the album is a departure for the band, darker and more "cinematic and atmospheric".

Manson's approach to lyrical subject matter came from her perception of an absence of darkness in current pop cultural trends. "I feel like the musical landscape of late has been incredibly happy and shiny and poppy. Everybody’s fronting all the time, dancing as fast as they can, smiling as hard as they can, working on their brand. Nobody ever says, ‘Actually, I’m lost and I don’t have a fucking clue what I’m doing with the rest of my life and I'm frightened.’ "There aren't really any upbeat pop songs,” says Vig. “Even "Empty", which has a big, anthemic guitar sound, has pretty dark lyrics".

== Recording ==
Writing and recording for Strange Little Birds took over two years, beginning in early 2013. Garbage recorded over twenty tracks during the sessions. The band recorded the album in Vig's basement and at engineer Billy Bush's Red Razor Sounds studio in Los Angeles. Vig stated, "we mixed it so it’s kind of confessional, almost confrontational. On a lot of songs, Shirley’s voice sounds really loud, in your face, and really dry. There are not a lot of effects. There are some moments on the record that get really huge, but a lot of it is really intimate." Two of the songs written during the sessions, "The Chemicals" and "On Fire", were given a vinyl release on Record Store Day the previous year.

== Critical reception ==
Professional ratings
Aggregate scores
| Source | Rating |
|---|---|
| AnyDecentMusic? | 7.0/10 |
| Metacritic | 75/100 |
Review scores
| Source | Rating |
| AllMusic | 4/5 stars |
| The A.V. Club | A− |
| Clash | 7/10 |
| NME | 4/5 |
| The Observer | 2/5 stars |
| Pitchfork | 7.0/10 |
| PopMatters | 8/10 stars |
| Rolling Stone | 3.5/5 stars |
| Slant Magazine | 4/5 stars |
| Spin | 8/10 |

Strange Little Birds received generally positive reviews from music critics. At AnyDecentMusic?, which collects critical reviews from more than 50 media sources, the album scored 7.0 points out of 10, based on 25 reviews. At Metacritic, which assigns a normalized rating out of 100 to reviews from mainstream publications, the album received an average score of 75, based on 26 reviews.

Annie Zaleski of The A.V. Club wrote, "20-plus years after forming, each band member is still fired up to mine new sounds and approaches for inspiration. That willingness to be uncomfortable and look beneath the surface makes Strange Little Birds a rousing success." Rhian Daly of NME noted that "Strange Little Birds is a record that's human to its very core, revelling in flaws and failures, but never losing hope. And in that way, it's the perfect mirror for its creators' 22-year career." AllMusic's Stephen Thomas Erlewine found that "the impressive thing about Strange Little Birds is how it feels simultaneously familiar and fresh, a record that echoes the past without being trapped by it." Rolling Stone's Jon Dolan commented that "singer Shirley Manson's brooding edge and producer-drummer Butch Vig's mix of sheer guitar buzz and moody industrial texture stake their claim as forebears to artists like Sky Ferreira and even Lana Del Rey." Theon Weber of Spin viewed Strange Little Birds as the band's "strongest set of songs since Version 2.0" and stated that despite not being "innovative", the album "successfully excavates old and gorgeous Garbage: digs it up, dusts it off, reassembles it, and lovingly crafts replacements, piece by vivid piece, for the strange little sounds that have rotted away."

Zoe Camp of Pitchfork dubbed the album Garbage's "strongest effort in 15 years", adding, "Despite these superficial similarities [to the band's self-titled debut album], repeat spins of Strange Little Birds ultimately belie an older, wiser reincarnation of that youthful rage, not just a cheap retrospective." Jordan Blum of PopMatters opined, "Though the LP isn't as varied or experimental as its predecessor, 2012's Not Your Kind of People, it is more cohesive and alluring, resulting in a superior collection overall and a strong addition to the Garbage catalog." Slant Magazine's Sal Cinquemani expressed that aside from "Empty" and "We Never Tell", which he characterized as "gratifying but superfluous detours into the well-trodden", Strange Little Birds "emerges as the band's most compelling, adventurous album in 15 years." Luke Winstanley of Clash praised the album as "a thrilling synthesis of the band's most endearing features; quasi metal riffing, with Shirley Manson's devilishly seductive croon and huge industrial pop hooks", concluding, "There are a few moments that feel oddly dated or too by-the-numbers, but otherwise, this is an engaging return from the gothic dance-rock four-piece." In a less enthusiastic review, Emily Mackay of The Observer called the album a "sluggish comeback" and felt that "[t]here's plenty of build [...] but little release, and a lack of those big, punchy choruses that were [the band's] strongest suit."

== Commercial performance ==
Strange Little Birds debuted at number 17 on the UK Albums Chart with 5,293 copies sold on its first week, becoming Garbage's first studio album to miss the top 10 in the United Kingdom. It dropped out of the top 100 the following week, making it the band's lowest-charting album in the UK. In the United States, the album sold 20,000 (21,000 with TEA and SEA units) copies to debut at number one on both the Top Rock Albums and Alternative Albums charts, and at number 14 on the Billboard 200. The album also peaked at number nine on the Australian Albums Chart, earning the band their sixth consecutive top 10 studio album in that country.

== Track listing ==
All tracks are written by Garbage.

Strange Little Birds track listing
| No. | Title | Length |
|---|---|---|
| 1. | "Sometimes" | 2:52 |
| 2. | "Empty" | 3:54 |
| 3. | "Blackout" | 6:32 |
| 4. | "If I Lost You" | 4:11 |
| 5. | "Night Drive Loneliness" | 5:24 |
| 6. | "Even Though Our Love Is Doomed" | 5:26 |
| 7. | "Magnetized" | 3:54 |
| 8. | "We Never Tell" | 4:25 |
| 9. | "So We Can Stay Alive" | 6:01 |
| 10. | "Teaching Little Fingers to Play" | 3:58 |
| 11. | "Amends" | 6:04 |
| Total length: | | 52:41 |

LP bonus track
| No. | Title | Length |
|---|---|---|
| 12. | "FWY (Fucking with You)" | 4:44 |

== Personnel ==
Credits adapted from the liner notes of Strange Little Birds.

=== Musicians ===
- Shirley Manson – vocals
- Duke Erikson – backing vocals (track 11)
- Eric Avery – bass (tracks 2, 3, 7–9, 11)
- Justin Meldal-Johnsen – bass (tracks 5, 6)

=== Technical ===
- Garbage – production
- Billy Bush – engineering, mixing, additional production
- Butch Vig – additional recording
- Steve Marker – additional production
- Emily Lazar – mastering (at The Lodge, New York City)
- Chris Allgood – mastering assistance

=== Artwork ===
- Joseph Cultice – photography
- Ryan Corey – art direction, design, illustration, additional photos
- Jeri Heiden – art direction

== Charts ==
Weekly sales chart performance for Strange Little Birds
| Chart (2016) | Peak position |
|---|---|
| Australian Albums (ARIA) | 9 |
| Austrian Albums (Ö3 Austria) | 17 |
| Belgian Albums (Ultratop Flanders) | 33 |
| Belgian Albums (Ultratop Wallonia) | 16 |
| Canadian Albums (Billboard) | 69 |
| Czech Albums (ČNS IFPI) | 21 |
| Dutch Albums (Album Top 100) | 66 |
| French Albums (SNEP) | 23 |
| German Albums (Offizielle Top 100) | 22 |
| Irish Albums (IRMA) | 45 |
| Irish Independent Albums (IRMA) | 4 |
| Italian Albums (FIMI) | 33 |
| Japanese Albums (Oricon) | 161 |
| New Zealand Albums (RMNZ) | 18 |
| Russian Albums (Russian Music Charts) | 4 |
| Scottish Albums (OCC) | 11 |
| Spanish Albums (Promusicae) | 23 |
| Swiss Albums (Schweizer Hitparade) | 16 |
| UK Albums (OCC) | 17 |
| UK Independent Albums (OCC) | 5 |
| US Billboard 200 | 14 |
| US Independent Albums (Billboard) | 1 |
| US Top Alternative Albums (Billboard) | 1 |
| US Top Rock Albums (Billboard) | 1 |

== Release history ==
Release formats for Strange Little Birds
| Region | Date | Label | Distributor | Format(s) |
|---|---|---|---|---|
| Australia and New Zealand | June 10, 2016 | Stunvolume | Liberator Music | CD; LP; digital download |
| Asia, Europe, and South America | June 10, 2016 | Stunvolume | PIAS; Cooperative Music | CD; LP; digital download |
| United States, Canada | June 10, 2016 | Stunvolume | BMG; INgrooves | CD; LP; digital download |
| Japan | June 10, 2016 | Stunvolume | Hostess | CD; LP; digital download |
