= Peter Andre discography =

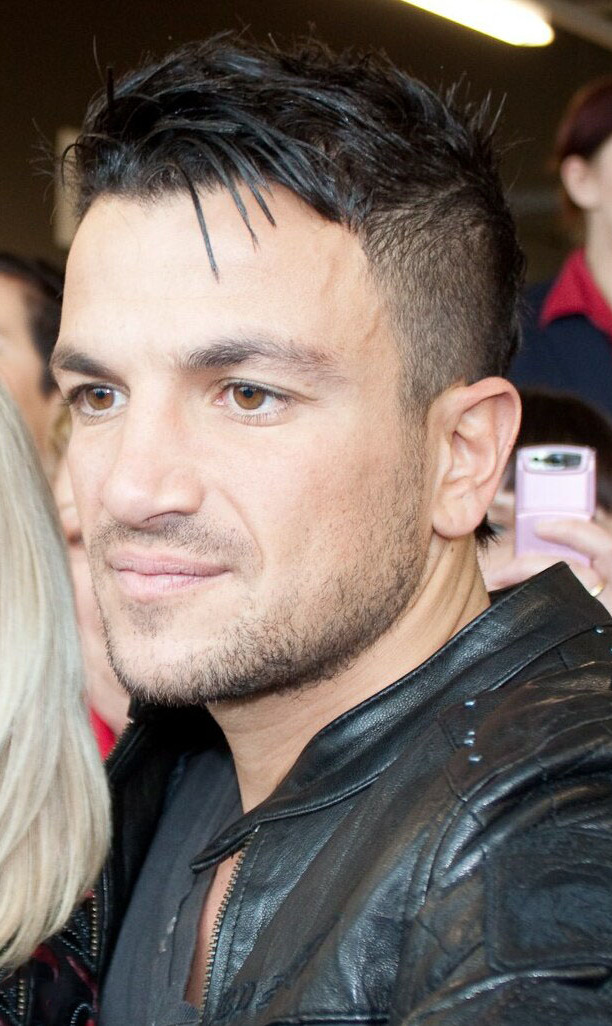
- Andre in 2010
- Studio albums: 11
- Compilation albums: 3
- Singles: 29

The discography of British-Australian pop singer Peter Andre contains eleven studio albums, three compilation albums and twenty-nine singles. Andre has sales of over 920,000 albums and 1.4 million singles in the UK, making his total UK sales 2,320,000 according to the BPI. His current Australian sales stand at over 1,000,000.

Peter Andre, Andre's debut album, was released on 28 November 1993. The album reached No. 27 on the Australian Albums Chart. "Drive Me Crazy", was released in Australia in 1992 as the lead single from the album. The album also includes the singles "Gimme Little Sign", "Funky Junky", "Let's Get It On / Do You Wanna Dance?" and "To the Top". Natural, Andre's second studio album, was released on 30 September 1996, and topped the UK Albums Chart. The album included the hit single "Mysterious Girl", which peaked at No. 2 on the UK Singles Chart. The album also includes the singles "Turn It Up", "Only One", "Get Down on It", "Flava", "I Feel You" and "Natural". Time, Andre's third studio album, was released on 17 November 1997, peaking at number 28 on the UK Albums Chart. The album includes the singles "All About Us", "Lonely" and "All Night, All Right". The Long Road Back, Andre's fourth studio album, was released on 7 June 2004, peaking at number 44 on the UK Albums Chart. He re-released his 1995 single "Mysterious Girl" it peaked at No. 1 on the UK Singles Chart. The album also includes the singles "Insania" and "The Right Way".

A Whole New World, Andre's fifth studio album, was released on 27 November 2006, peaking at number 20 on the UK Albums Chart. He released the album with his former wife, English model and celebrity Katie Price. Revelation, Andre's sixth studio album, was released on 14 September 2009, peaking at number 3 on the UK Albums Chart. "Behind Closed Doors" was released as the lead single from the album in August 2009, reaching number 4 on the UK Singles Chart. "Unconditional" was released as the second single from the album in November 2009. Accelerate, Andre's seventh studio album, was released on 1 November 2010, debuting at number 10 on the UK Albums Chart. It marked a new urban direction for Andre. "Defender" was released as the lead single from the album in October 2010, achieving a number 14 peak on the UK Singles Chart. "Perfect Night" was released as the second single from the album in July 2011, peaking at number 48 on the UK Singles Chart. Angels & Demons, Andre's eighth studio album, was released on 29 October 2012 and reached number 18 on the UK Albums Chart. "Bad as You Are" was released as the lead single from the album on 22 October 2012. Big Night, Andre's ninth studio album, was released on 26 May 2014, peaking at number 23 on the UK Albums Chart. "Kid" was released as the lead single from the album on 9 February 2014, reaching number 144 on the UK Singles Chart. The song was chosen for the DreamWorks animated movie Mr. Peabody & Sherman and was also used in the Autumn Iceland TV commercials. "Big Night" was released as the second single from the album on 13 April 2014. White Christmas, Andre's tenth studio album, was released on 21 November 2014. Come Fly with Me, Andre's eleventh studio album, was released on 15 October 2015. The album debuted at No. 5 on the UK Albums Chart.

== Albums ==
=== Studio albums ===
Title	Details	Peak chart positions									Certifications
Title	Details	UK	AUS	AUT	FIN	IRE	NL	NZ	SWE	SWI	Certifications
Peter Andre	Released: 29 November 1993; Label: Melodian; Formats: CD, cassette	—	27	—	—	—	—	—	—	—	ARIA: Gold
Natural	Released: 18 March 1996 (Australia) 30 September 1996 (UK); Label: Mushroom (#DX2005); Formats: CD, cassette	1	11	28	37	18	8	12	11	11	BPI: Platinum; NVPI: Gold; RMNZ: Platinum
Time	Released: 17 November 1997; Label: Mushroom (#MUSH18CD); Formats: CD, cassette	28	119	—	—	—	89	28	—	—	BPI: Gold
The Long Road Back	Released: 7 June 2004; Label: East West (#5046738102); Formats: Digital download, CD	44	—	—	—	62	—	—	—	—	BPI: Silver
A Whole New World (with Katie Price)	Released: 4 December 2006; Label: K&P (#KANDPCD1); Formats: Digital download, CD	20	—	—	—	43	—	—	—	—	BPI: Gold
Revelation	Released: 14 September 2009; Label: Conehead (#CONE9); Formats: Digital download, CD	3	—	—	—	—	—	—	—	—	BPI: Platinum
Accelerate	Released: 1 November 2010; Label: Conehead (#CONE9); Formats: Digital download, CD	10	—	—	—	—	—	—	—	—	BPI: Gold
Angels & Demons	Released: 29 October 2012; Label: Conehead (#CONE9); Formats: Digital download, CD	18	—	—	—	—	—	—	—	—	
Big Night	Released: 26 May 2014; Label: Andre Music; Formats: Digital download, CD	23	—	—	—	—	—	—	—	—	
White Christmas	Released: 21 November 2014; Label: Andre Music; Formats: Digital download, CD	157	—	—	—	—	—	—	—	—	
Come Fly with Me	Released: 16 October 2015; Label: Andre Music; Formats: Digital download, CD	5	—	—	—	—	—	—	—	—	
Legacy	Released: 10 April 2026; Label: Peter Andre; Formats: Digital download, CD, LP	— (Note: "Legacy" did not enter the UK Albums Chart Top 100, but debuted at number 14 on the UK Albums Sales Chart.)	—	—	—	—	—	—	—	—	
"—" denotes an album that did not chart or was not released in that territory.

=== Compilation albums ===
Title	Details	Peak chart positions	Certifications
Title	Details	UK	Certifications
The Very Best of Peter Andre: The Hits Collection	Released: 2002; Label: Music Club; Format: CD	—	BPI: Gold
The Platinum Collection	Released: May 2005; Label: Warner; Format: CD	—	
Unconditional: Love Songs	Released: 1 February 2010; Label: Rhino (#5186574172); Formats: CD, digital download	7	

== Singles ==
Year	Title	Peak chart positions										Certifications	Album
Year	Title	UK	UK Indie	AUS	AUT	FIN	IRE	NL	NZ	SWE	SWI	Certifications	Album
1992	"Drive Me Crazy"	—	—	72	—	—	—	—	—	—	—		Peter Andre
1992	"Gimme Little Sign"	—	—	3	—	—	—	—	—	—	—	ARIA: Platinum	Peter Andre
1993	"Funky Junky"	—	—	13	—	—	—	—	—	—	—	ARIA: Gold	Peter Andre
1993	"Let's Get It On / Do You Wanna Dance?" (featuring Eric Sebastian)	—	—	17	—	—	—	—	—	—	—		Peter Andre
1994	"To the Top"	—	—	46	—	—	—	—	—	—	—		Peter Andre
1995	"Turn It Up"	64	—	—	—	—	—	—	—	—	—		Natural
1995	"Mysterious Girl" (featuring Bubbler Ranx)	2	—	8	3	20	3	3	1	6	7	ARIA: Platinum; BPI: Platinum; BVMI: Gold; NVPI: Gold; RMNZ: 3× Platinum	Natural
1996	"Get Down on It" (featuring Past to Present)	—	—	5	—	—	—	—	1	—	—	ARIA: Gold; RMNZ: Platinum	Natural
1996	"Only One"	16	—	58	—	—	—	94	5	—	—	RMNZ: Gold	Natural
1996	"Flava"	1	—	62	—	16	10	5	8	8	40	BPI: Silver	Natural
1996	"I Feel You"	1	—	—	—	—	16	20	40	52	—	BPI: Silver	Natural
1997	"Natural"	6	—	—	—	—	—	—	—	—	—		Natural
1997	"All About Us" (featuring Montell Jordan and Lil' Bo Peep)	3	1	65	—	—	—	31	28	—	—		Time
1997	"Lonely"	6	—	—	—	—	—	—	—	—	—		Time
1998	"All Night, All Right" (featuring Warren G and Coolio)	16	—	30	—	—	—	41	13	48	—		Time
1998	"Kiss the Girl"	9	—	—	—	—	—	92	35	—	—		Non-album single
2004	"Mysterious Girl" (featuring Bubbler Ranx; re-release)	1	—	—	—	—	2	—	—	—	—		The Long Road Back
2004	"Insania"	3	—	108	—	—	14	—	—	—	—		The Long Road Back
2004	"The Right Way"	14	—	—	—	—	—	—	—	—	—		The Long Road Back
2006	"A Whole New World" (featuring Katie Price)	12	—	—	—	—	38	—	—	—	—		A Whole New World
2009	"Behind Closed Doors"	4	1	—	—	—	—	—	—	—	—		Revelation
2009	"Unconditional"	50	6	—	—	—	—	—	—	—	—		Revelation
2010	"I Can't Make You Love Me"	—	—	—	—	—	—	—	—	—	—		Unconditional: Love Songs
2010	"Defender"	14	2	—	—	—	—	—	—	—	—		Accelerate
2011	"Perfect Night"	48	7	—	—	—	—	—	—	—	—		Accelerate
2012	"Bad as You Are"	—	—	—	—	—	—	—	—	—	—		Angels & Demons
2014	"Kid"	144	24	—	—	—	—	—	—	—	—		Big Night
2014	"Big Night"	—	—	—	—	—	—	—	—	—	—		Big Night
2014	"Christmas Time's for Family"	—	—	—	—	—	—	—	—	—	—		White Christmas
2026	"Rock U Right"	— (Note: "Rock U Right" did not enter the UK Singles Chart, but debuted at number 78 on the UK Singles Downloads Chart.)	—	—	—	—	—	—	—	—	—		Legacy
2026	"All About Us 2.0" (with Montell Jordan)	—	—	—	—	—	—	—	—	—	—		Legacy
"—" denotes a single that did not chart or was not released in that territory.
