= The Very Best of Peter Andre: The Hits Collection =

Peter Andre

Greatest hits album by Peter Andre
- Released: 2002
- Recorded: 1992–1998
- Genre: Pop; R&B
- Label: Music Club

Peter Andre chronology
Time (1997)	Peter Andre (2002)	The Long Road Back (2004)

The Very Best of Peter Andre: The Hits Collection is the first compilation album released by singer Peter Andre, containing hits from early in his career.

== Track listing ==
No.	Title	Writer(s)	Producer(s)	Length
1.	"Mysterious Girl" (featuring Bubbler Ranx)	Peter Andre; Ollie Jacobs; Phillip Jacobs; Glen Goldsmith; Bubbler Ranx	Ollie J	3:43
2.	"Flava" (featuring Cee)	Andre; Andy Whitmore; Wayne Hector; Cee	Whitmore	4:00
3.	"Gimme Little Sign / I'm Gonna Get to You" (featuring Eric Sebastian)	Andre; Smith; Hooven; Winn	Phil Harding; Ian Curnow; Ashley Cadell; Mark Forrester	3:28 / 4:34
4.	"All Night, All Right" (featuring Warren G)	Andre; Montell Jordan; Atris Ivey; Juan Carlos Vercher; Perry Kibble	Jordan; Professor Funk	3:29
5.	"To the Top"	Andre; Cadell	Cadell; Forrester	4:21
6.	"Let's Get It On" (featuring Eric Sebastian)	Andre; Cadell; Forrester; Marcia Hines	Cadell; Forrester	4:11
7.	"Natural"	Andre; O. Jacobs; P. Jacobs; Goldsmith	Cutfather & Joe	3:47
8.	"Rest of My Life" (featuring Brian McKnight)	Andre; McKnight	McKnight
9.	"I Feel You"	Andre; Goldsmith; Terry "Juice" Jones	Cutfather & Joe	5:02
10.	"Kiss The Girl"	Howard Ashman; Alan Menken	Robert Livingstone; Shaun 'Sting' Pizzonia	2:52
11.	"The Tracks of My Tears" (featuring John Forté and Pras)	Marv Tarplin; William "Smokey" Robinson; Warren Moore	Pras; Jerry Duplessis	3:44
12.	"Lonely"	Hector; Joe Belmaati; Mich Hansen	Cutfather & Joe	5:04
13.	"Best of Me" (featuring Izreal)	Andre; Steve Kipner; John Lewis Parker	Parker; Kipner	4:05
14.	"All About Us" (featuring Montell Jordan & Lil' Bo Peep)	Jordan; Lil Bo'Peep	Jordan	4:27
15.	"Funky Junky" (Rap) (featuring Maurice Llewelyn)	Andre; Antoine Palade	Cadell	3:51
16.	"Only One"	Andre; O. Jacobs; P. Jacobs; Ogilvy	Ollie J; Mykaell Riley^{[a]}	3:52
17.	"Turn It Up" (featuring Ollie J)	Andre; O. Jacobs; P. Jacobs; Goldsmith; Mark Walcot	Ollie J	3:24
18.	"Get Down on It" (featuring Past to Present)	Bell; Bell; Taylor; George Brown; Hickens; Otha Nash; Larry Gittens; Dennis Thomas; Smith; Ricky West	Andre; Nu-O	4:47

== Certifications ==
Region	Certification	Certified units/sales
United Kingdom (BPI)	Gold	100,000^{*}
^{*} Sales figures based on certification alone.
