= List of UK Independent Singles Chart number ones of 1997 =

These are UK Official Indie Chart number one hits of 1997.Complied by Music Week until October 18 then by The Official UK Charts Company

Issue date	Song	Artist	Record label	Ref
4 January	"Forever"	Damage	Big Life	
11 January	"Forever"	Damage	Big Life	
18 January	"Forever"	Damage	Big Life	
25 January	"In My Arms"	Erasure	Mute	
1 February	"Saturday Night"	Suede	Nude	
8 February	"Hedonism (Just Because You Feel Good)"	Skunk Anansie	One Little Indian	
15 February	"Hedonism (Just Because You Feel Good)"	Skunk Anansie	One Little Indian	
22 February	"Barrel of a Gun"	Depeche Mode	Mute	
1 March	"Dark Clouds"	Space	Gut	
8 March	"You Got the Love"	The Source featuring Candi Staton	React	
15 March	"Don't Say Your Love Is Killing Me"	Erasure	Mute	
22 March	"Sixty Mile Smile"	3 Colours Red	Creation	
29 March	"Everybody Knows (Except You)"	The Divine Comedy	Setanta Records	
5 April	"Anywhere For You"	Backstreet Boys	Jive	
12 April	"Anywhere For You"	Backstreet Boys	Jive	
19 April	"It's No Good"	Depeche Mode	Mute	
26 April	"It's No Good"	Depeche Mode	Mute	
3 May	"I Believe I Can Fly"	R. Kelly	Jive	
10 May	"I Believe I Can Fly"	R. Kelly	Jive	
17 May	"Pure"	3 Colours Red	Creation	
24 May	"Wonderful Tonight"	Damage	Big Life	
31 May	"Wonderful Tonight"	Damage	Big Life	
7 June	"Wonderful Tonight"	Damage	Big Life	
14 June	"Wonderful Tonight"	Damage	Big Life	
21 June	"Brazen (Weep)"	Skunk Anansie	One Little Indian	
28 June	"I Believe I Can Fly"	R.Kelly	Jive	
5 July	"Brazen (Weep)"	Skunk Anansie	One Little Indian	
12 July	"Age of Love" (remixes)	Age of Love	DiKi	
19 July	"Ain't That Enough"	Teenage Fanclub	Creation	
26 July	"D'You Know What I Mean?"	Oasis	Creation	
2 August	"C U When U Get There"	Coolio featuring 40 Thevz	Tommy Boy	
9 August	"C U When U Get There"	Coolio featuring 40 Thevz	Tommy Boy	
16 August	"All About Us"	Peter Andre	Mushroom	
23 August	"Everybody (Backstreet's Back)"	Backstreet Boys	Jive	
30 August	"C U When U Get There"	Coolio featuring 40 Thevz	Tommy Boy	
6 September	"C U When U Get There"	Coolio featuring 40 Thevz	Tommy Boy	
13 September	"C U When U Get There"	Coolio featuring 40 Thevz	Tommy Boy	
20 September	"Offshore 97"	Chicane with Power Circle	Xtravaganza	
27 September	"Plastic Dreams"	Jaydee	R&S	
4 October	"Samba de Janeiro"	Bellini	Orbit	
11 October	"Stand By Me"	Oasis	Creation	
18 October	"As Long as You Love Me"	Backstreet Boys	Jive	
25 October	"As Long as You Love Me"	Backstreet Boys	Jive	
1 November	"As Long as You Love Me"	Backstreet Boys	Jive	
8 November	"Lonely"	Peter Andre	Mushroom	
15 November	"James Bond Theme"	Moby	Mute	
22 November	"James Bond Theme"	Moby	Mute	
29 November	"Crush on You"	Aaron Carter	Ultrapop	
6 December	"Open Your Mind '97"	U.S.U.R.A.	Malarky	
13 December	"Let a Boy Cry"	Gala	Big Life	
20 December	"History Repeating"	Propellerheads featuring Shirley Bassey	Wall of Sound	
27 December	"5,6,7,8"	Steps	Jive	

== See also ==
- 1997 in music
