= Unconditional: Love Songs =

Compilation album by Peter Andre
- Released: 1 February 2010
- Recorded: 1996–2010
- Genre: Pop, R&B and soul
- Label: Conehead Management
- Producer: AC Burrell & Kevin McPherson/Various

Peter Andre chronology
Revelation (2009)	Unconditional: Love Songs (2010)	Accelerate (2010)

Singles from Unconditional: Love Songs
- 1. "I Can't Make You Love Me" Released: 29 January 2010

Professional ratings
Review scores
Source	Rating
Digital Spy	3/5 stars

Unconditional: Love Songs is the third compilation album released by Australian singer-songwriter Peter Andre, following The Very Best of Peter Andre: The Hits Collection (2002) and The Platinum Collection (2005).

== Background ==
Following the success of Revelation, it was announced that Conehead Management had bought the rights to release all of Andre's previous material in a new compilation format. On 2 December 2009, it was announced that Conehead had decided to release a compilation featuring ten of Andre's classic love songs, as well as five new recordings specifically for the album. On 29 January 2010, the album's one and only single, "I Can't Make You Love Me", was released via digital download. The album was officially released on 1 February 2010, selling over 65,000 copies and being certified silver, as well as peaking at number 7 on the UK Albums Chart. To promote the album, Andre embarked on a nationwide promotional tour, signing copies of the album and undertaking various print, television and radio interviews. Andre performed the album's new recordings as part of his Revelation Tour, which started in November 2010.

== Track listing ==
No.	Title	Writer(s)	Producer(s)	Length
1.	"Unconditional"	Peter Andre; AC Burrell; Francesca Richard; Kevin McPherson; Charles Syndor	Burrell; McPherson	4:05
2.	"I Can't Make You Love Me"	Mike Reid; Allen Shamblin		3:42
3.	"Rest of My Life" (featuring Brian McKnight)	Andre; McKnight	McKnight	4:21
4.	"Go Back"	Burrell; Richard; Jeffrey Anderson; Ryan Pate; David Dodini	Burrell	3:19
5.	"Lonely"	Wayne Hector; Joe Belmaati; Mich Hansen	Cutfather & Joe	5:04
6.	"Lost Without U"	Robin Thicke; Sean Hurley		3:05
7.	"Call the Doctor"	Andre; Burrell; McPherson; Raelene Arreguin; Gregory Curtis Jr.	Burrell; McPherson	3:35
8.	"Stay with Me"	Andre; Anthony Johnson; Roger King; Lee Bennett Thompson	King; Stepz	4:38
9.	"Overjoyed"	Stevie Wonder	AC Burrell, Kevin McPherson	3:48
10.	"She's Out of My Life"	Tom Bahler		3:08
11.	"All Cried Out"	Andre; Danny O'Donoghue; Mark Sheehan; Eugene Wild	O'Donoghue; Sheehan	4:09
12.	"Letting You Go"	McKnight; Diane Warren	McKnight	4:48
13.	"I Feel You"	Andre; Terry "Juice" Jones; Glen Goldsmith	Cutfather & Joe	5:02
14.	"The Right Way"	Andre, David Tyson	David Tyson	4:39
15.	"Sign Your Name"	Terence Trent D'Arby		3:47
16.	"Untouchable"	Andre; O'Donoghue; Sheehan; Bray Merritt	O'Donoghue; Sheehan	3:50

== Charts ==
=== Weekly charts ===
Chart (2010)	Peak position
Scottish Albums (OCC)	14
UK Albums (OCC)	7

=== Year-end charts ===
Chart (2010)	Position
UK Albums (OCC)	200

== Certifications ==
Country	Provider	Certification	Sales
United Kingdom	BPI	Silver	65,000+
