= Come Fly with Me (Peter Andre album) =

Come Fly With Me

Studio album by Peter Andre
- Released: 16 October 2015
- Recorded: 2015
- Genre: Swing; soul; big band
- Length: 34:50
- Label: East West
- Producer: Nick Southwood

Peter Andre chronology
White Christmas (2014)	Come Fly With Me (2015)

Come Fly with Me is the eleventh studio album by the British-Australian singer Peter Andre, released on 16 October 2015 by East West Records. The album is Andre's second swing album following the release of Big Night in 2014, however, unlike Big Night, the album consists mostly of covers of Rat Pack classics, as well as three original songs and a swing version of his former hit "Mysterious Girl".

== Background ==
The album was recorded to coincide with Andre's appearance on the latest series of Strictly Come Dancing. The album was produced by Nick Southwood, and features bassist Adam King, drummer Adrian Meehan and keyboardist Rich Milner. Andre said of the album: “All of these songs are great great classics. The fact that we’re celebrating hundred years of Frank Sinatra makes the choice even better because you can start to pick some of the favourites that Franky was really well-known for. When you listen to these old classics, you realise what real music is.”

On 28 September 2015 Andre released a music video for "Come Fly with Me" exclusively via Heatworld.com. One of the tracks on the album, "Little Miss Notting Hill", was written by fellow swing band the Overtones, alongside producer Southwood.

The release of the album was to be accompanied by a 16-date tour in 2016, entitled the Come Swing with Me tour. The tour will incorporate both arenas and theatres, and includes a flagship show at the O2 Arena in London on 20 March 2016.

== Track listing ==
No.	Title	Writer(s)	Producer(s)	Length
1.	"Fly Me to the Moon"	Bart Howard	Nick Southwood	2:28
2.	"I've Got You Under My Skin"	Cole Porter	Southwood	3:31
3.	"Ain't That a Kick in the Head?"	Sammy Cahn; Jimmy Van Heusen	Southwood	2:28
4.	"Come Fly with Me"	Cahn; Van Heusen	Southwood	3:17
5.	"You Make Me Feel So Young"	Mack Gordon; Josef Joe Myrow	Southwood	2:54
6.	"Mack the Knife"	Marc Blitzstein; Kurt Weill; Bertolt Brecht	Southwood	3:06
7.	"You're Nobody till Somebody Loves You"	Russ Morgan; Larry Stock; James Cavanaugh	Southwood	2:15
8.	"Ain't It Strange (Falling in Love)"	Iain James; Jez Ashurst	Southwood	3:37
9.	"Little Miss Notting Hill"	Timmy Matley; Mark Franks; Lachie Chapman; Mike Crawshaw; Darren Everest; Dan McDougall	Southwood	2:58
10.	"Mysterious Girl" (Swing version)	Peter Andre; Bubbler Ranx; Ollie Jacobs; Philip Jacobs; Glen Goldsmith	Southwood	4:24
11.	"Turn It Up"	Mark King; Southwood; J. Roston	Southwood	3:52

== Charts ==
Chart (2015)	Peak position
Scottish Albums (OCC)	9
UK Albums (OCC)	5
