= Perfect Night =

Perfect Night may refer to:

- "Perfect Night" (Le Sserafim song), a 2023 single
- "Perfect Night" (Peter Andre song), a 2011 single from the 2010 album Accelerate
- Perfect Night: Live in London, a 1998 album by Lou Reed
