= Fly with Me =

Fly with Me may refer to:

- Fly with Me (TV series), a TV series from Hong Kong station Television Broadcasts Limited
- "Fly with Me" (Jonas Brothers song)
- "Fly with Me" (Mumzy Stranger song)
- "Fly with Me" (Artsvik song)
- "Fly with Me!", a 1968 song by the short-lived psychedelic pop group The Avant-Garde
- "Fly With Me", a 1998 song by 98 Degrees from the album 98 Degrees and Rising
- Fly with Me, a 1979 album by Supermax
- Fly with Me (musical), a 1920 musical by Rodgers and Hart

== See also ==
- Come Fly with Me (disambiguation)
