= Come Fly with Me =

Come Fly with Me may refer to:

== Music ==
- "Come Fly with Me" (1958 song), a popular song written by Jimmy Van Heusen and Sammy Cahn, and the title track of:
  - Come Fly with Me (Frank Sinatra album), 1958
  - Come Fly with Me (Michael Bublé album)
  - Come Fly with Me (Peter Andre album)
- "Come Fly with Me" (Foxy Brown song)
- Come Fly with Me, the original title for the dance revue Come Fly Away

== Film and television ==
- Come Fly with Me (film), a 1963 comedy about stewardesses
- Come Fly with Me (1976 film), a Hong Kong film of 1976
- Come Fly with Me (2009 film), an Australian short film partially shot at Bankstown Airport
- Come Fly with Me (1958 TV series), a Canadian music variety show
- Come Fly with Me (2010 TV series), a British 'mockumentary' sketch show starring David Walliams and Matt Lucas
- "Come Fly with Me" (Modern Family), an episode of the TV series Modern Family
- "Come Fly with Me", an episode of the American sitcom Full House
- "Come Fly with Me", an episode of the Disney animated series Goof Troop
- "Come Fly with Me", an episode of the American sitcom Lizzie McGuire
- "Come Fly with Me", an episode of the American sitcom Twenty Good Years
