= The Right Way =

The Right Way or Right Way may refer to:

- "The Right Way" (song), a 2004 song by Peter Andre
- The Right Way (political party), an Israeli political faction
- "The Right Way", a song by Tynisha Keli
- Right Way (publisher), an imprint of Constable & Robinson
- The Right Way (2004 film), a 2004 Canadian film
- The Right Way (1921 film), a 1921 American silent drama film

== See also ==
- The Wright Way, British sitcom
- The Right Thing, a principle for software development
