= Natural (Peter Andre song) =

1997 single by Peter Andre

Single by Peter Andre

from the album Natural
- B-side: "You Are" (unplugged)
- Released: 24 February 1997
- Length: 3:41
- Label: Mushroom
- Songwriters: Peter Andre; Oliver Jacobs; Phillip Jacobs; Glen Goldsmith
- Producers: Cutfather & Joe; Tim Laws; Pete Craigie

Peter Andre singles chronology
"I Feel You" (1996)	"Natural" (1997)	"All About Us" (1997)

"Natural" is the seventh and final single from English singer Peter Andre's second studio album, Natural (1996). The song was released on 24 February 1997 through Mushroom Records and was heavily remixed for its single release. "Natural" peaked at number six on the UK Singles Chart and briefly charted in Germany and the Flanders region of Belgium.

== Critical reception ==
A reviewer from Music Week gave the song three out of five, adding, "More reggae-lite from the impeccably pecced Aussie. His huge fanbase should guarantee another Top 10." Gavin Reeve from Smash Hits gave "Natural" four out of five, writing, "It's the title track off the album and a top swingy-beaty choon it is too, with Pete in fine voice and lots of those little 'wicky-wicky' noises that you get nowadays in the background. Watch it gently tickle the top end of the charts. Oo-er!"

== Track listings ==
- UK CD1
1. "Natural" (radio edit) – 3:41
2. "Natural" (Soulcity mix) – 3:43
3. "You Are" (unplugged) – 3:45
4. "Natural" (James Khari mix) – 3:56
- UK CD2
1. "Natural" (radio edit) – 3:41
2. "Natural" (C+J Street mix) – 4:19
3. "Natural" (unplugged) – 3:51
4. "I Feel You" (acoustic) – 5:38
- UK cassette single and European CD single
1. "Natural" (radio edit) – 3:41
2. "I Feel You" (unplugged) – 5:28

== Charts ==
Chart (1997)	Peak position
Belgium (Ultratip Bubbling Under Flanders)	8
Estonia (Eesti Top 20)	4
Europe (Eurochart Hot 100)	93
Germany (GfK)	90
Israel (IBA)	14
Scotland Singles (OCC)	6
UK Singles (OCC)	6
UK Airplay (Music Week)	19
