= All About Us (Peter Andre song) =

1997 single by Peter Andre

Single by Peter Andre featuring Montell Jordan and Lil' Bo Peep

from the album Time
- B-side: "Mystery Track"
- Released: 28 July 1997
- Length: 3:55
- Label: Mushroom
- Songwriters: Montell Jordan; Lil' Bo Peep
- Producers: Montell Jordan; Schappel Crawford

Peter Andre singles chronology
"Natural" (1997)	"All About Us" (1997)	"Lonely" (1997)

"All About Us" is a song by British-Australian singer Peter Andre. It was released in July 1997 as the lead single from his third studio album, Time (1997). The album version features Montell Jordan and Lil' Bo Peep. "All About Us" peaked at number three on the UK Singles Chart and also charted in Australia, Flanders, the Netherlands, and New Zealand.

== Critical reception ==
In an album review, Brendan Swift from AllMusic said "the catchy dance of 'All About Us', produced, written and featuring Jordan's backing vocals, sounds like a knockoff from one of his albums (albeit a strong one)" and "among the strongest on Time".

== Track listings ==
UK CD1

1. "All About Us" (radio edit) – 3:55
2. "All About Us" (Gridlock mix) – 6:25
3. "All About Us" (Sole Survivor mix) – 9:30
4. "All About Us" (extended version) – 5:00

UK CD2

1. "All About Us" (radio edit without rap) – 3:55
2. "All About Us" (instrumental) – 4:25
3. "All About Us" (T-Total mix) – 6:55
4. "All About Us" (acappella) – 4:20

UK cassette single and European CD single

1. "All About Us" (radio edit) – 3:55
2. "Mystery Track" – 5:13

European maxi-CD single

1. "All About Us" (radio edit) – 3:55
2. "All About Us" (Gridlock mix) – 6:25
3. "All About Us" (Sole Survivor mix) – 9:30
4. "All About Us" (extended version) – 5:00
5. "All About Us" (T-Total mix) – 6:55
6. "All About Us" (radio edit without rap) – 3:55

Australian CD single

1. "All About Us" (radio edit without rap) – 3:55
2. "All About Us" (Gridlock mix) – 6:25
3. "All About Us" (radio edit) – 3:55
4. "All About Us" (Sole Survivor mix) – 9:30
5. "I Feel You" (acoustic) – 5:38
6. "You Are" (unplugged) – 3:45

== Charts ==
=== Weekly charts ===
Weekly chart performance for "All About Us"
Chart (1997)	Peak position
Australia (ARIA)	65
Belgium (Ultratip Bubbling Under Flanders)	13
Estonia (Eesti Top 20)	12
Europe (Eurochart Hot 100)	49
Israel (IBA)	25
Netherlands (Dutch Top 40)	24
Netherlands (Single Top 100)	31
New Zealand (Recorded Music NZ)	28
Scotland Singles (Official Charts)	6
UK Singles (Official Charts)	3
UK Airplay (Music Week)	15
UK Indie (Music Week)	1

=== Year-end charts ===
Year-end chart performance for "All About Us"
Chart (1997)	Position
UK Singles (OCC)	100
