= Turn It Up (Peter Andre song) =

1995 single by Peter Andre

Single by Peter Andre

from the album Natural
- B-side: "Drive Me Crazy"
- Released: 29 May 1995
- Genre: Swingbeat
- Length: 3:45
- Label: Mushroom
- Songwriters: Peter Andre; Ollie Jacobs; P. Jacobs; M. Walcot; G. Goldsmith
- Producer: Ollie Jacobs

Peter Andre singles chronology
"To the Top" (1994)	"Turn It Up" (1995)	"Mysterious Girl" (1995)

Music video
- "Turn It Up" on YouTube

"Turn It Up" is the lead single from English singer-songwriter Peter Andre's second studio album, Natural (1996). The single was released on 29 May 1995 through Mushroom Records and was Andre's first to be released in the United Kingdom, peaking at number 64 on the UK Singles Chart. The song features an uncredited rap from co-writer and producer Ollie Jacobs. The music video for "Turn It Up" features Andre performing with dancers at a party.

== Critical reception ==
Pan-European magazine Music & Media wrote, "As a one-man-teen-band—okay, a solo artist—Aussie Andre has already proved to be good enough to support East 17 on their Euro tour. A winning combination, judging by the streetwise swingbeat." The Guardian critic Ross Jones wrote: "A more caring society would almost feel sorry for 'Turn It Up' and its desperately ineffectual, borderline imbecilic bid for a bit of that West Coast 'flava'. Frankly, Heartbreak High's canteen scenes deserved better."

== Track listings ==
- UK CD single
1. "Turn It Up"
2. "Turn It Up" (extended mix)
3. "Drive Me Crazy"
- UK 7-inch and cassette single
1. "Turn It Up"
2. "Drive Me Crazy"

== Charts ==
Chart (1995)	Peak position
Scottish Singles Sales (Official Charts)	46
UK Singles (Official Charts)	64
UK Pop Tip Club Chart (Music Week)	13
