= What You See Is What You Get (Glen Goldsmith album) =

Studio album by Glen Goldsmith
- Released: 1988
- Label: RCA
- Producer: Jolley Harris Jolley

What You See Is What You Get is the only studio album by the British singer and songwriter Glen Goldsmith, released in 1988 by RCA Records. It includes four songs which reached the UK Singles Chart: "I Won't Cry" (No. 34), "Dreaming" (No. 12), "What You See Is What You Get" (No. 33) and "Save a Little Bit" (No. 73). The album reached number 14 in the UK Albums Chart.

== Track listing ==
All tracks written by Anna Jolley, Brian Harris and Mark Jolley, except where noted.

No.	Title	Writer(s)	Length
1.	"I Won't Cry"		3:56
2.	"Save a Little Bit"	Glen Goldsmith; Ashley Ingram	4:19
3.	"Dreaming"		4:13
4.	"Undercover"		3:42
5.	"Gone Too Far"		5:00
6.	"What You See Is What You Get"		3:16
7.	"Shame"		3:42
8.	"Keep in Touch"	Goldsmith; Toby Baker	4:02
9.	"Rhythm of Romance"	Michael Jay; Kerry Chater	4:37
10.	"Shadow of Doubt"		3:23

CD & cassette extra tracks

No.	Title	Length
11.	"What You See Is What You Get" (Remix)	6:25
12.	"I Won't Cry" (Back Yardie Mix)	5:17
13.	"I Won't Cry" (Original)	6:10
14.	"Dreaming" (Glen G for President Mix)	6:57

== Personnel ==
Credits adapted from the album's liner notes.

Musicians

- Glen Goldsmith – vocals
- Margo Buchanan – backing vocals
- Jules Harrington – backing vocals
- Brian Harris – drums, keyboards
- Anna Jolley – backing vocals
- Mark Jolley – drums, drum programming, programming, guitar,
- Ian Prince – keyboards
- Mike Stevens – keyboards, guitar, saxophone
- Zoot and the Roots – horn section

Production

- Produced and mixed by Jolley Harris Jolley (Anna Jolley, Brian Harris and Mark Jolley)
- Engineered by Steve Osborne, except track 1 by Mark Jolley; track 3 by Alan Moulder
- Assistant engineer: Peter Lorimer
- Design: SJH
- Photography: Mike Owen

== Charts ==
Chart performance for What You See Is What You Get
Chart (1988)	Peak position
UK Albums (Official Charts)	14

== Certifications ==
Certifications for What You See Is What You Get
Region	Certification	Certified units/sales
United Kingdom (BPI)	Silver	60,000^{^}
^{^} Shipments figures based on certification alone.
