= Defender (Peter Andre song) =

Single by Peter Andre

from the album Accelerate
- Released: 24 October 2010
- Recorded: 6 May 2010
- Genre: Dance-pop, R&B
- Length: 3:14
- Label: Conehead Management
- Songwriters: Peter Andre, Dantae Johnson, Nait Rawknait Masuku
- Producers: Nait Rawknait Masuku & Dantae Johnson

Peter Andre singles chronology
"I Can't Make You Love Me" (2010)	"Defender" (2010)	"Perfect Night" (2011)

"Defender" is the first single from British recording artist Peter Andre's seventh studio album, Accelerate. The single was released on 24 October 2010 via Digital Download, with a physical release following a day later, exclusive to retailer ASDA. The song was written by Peter Andre, Dantae Johnson, Nait Rawknait Masuku, and was produced by Nait Rawknait Masuku & Dantae Johnson with additional keyboards, drum programming and mixing by Pete "Boxsta" Martin.

== Music video ==
The "Defender" music video was directed by Peter Falloon and portrays Andre performing militant choreography with several dancers. The video was inspired by Janet Jackson, with Andre commenting "Style wise I can definitely admit to borrowing a bit of Rhythm Nation."

== Live performance ==
On 17 October 2010, Andre performed the song on the live Strictly Come Dancing results show. Andre has also performed the song on The Alan Titchmarsh Show and Live from Studio Five, both performances occurred on 25 October 2010. He also performed the song on Daytime TV show This Morning.

== Critical reception ==
Nick Levine of Digital Spy gave the song a mixed review stating:

He may have all the credibility of an Apprentice candidate trying to flog some rather stodgy-looking bread rolls at £1.82 a pop, but, for a popstar in the commercial tundra of 2010, Peter Andre's actually doing pretty well. Last year's comeback platter Revelation debuted at number three on the UK albums chart and went on to shift a not-too-shabby 300,000 copies.

'Defender', the trailer for its efficiently-assembled follow-up Accelerate, is a melodramatic pop-R&B midtempo that works the corny old love-is-war metaphor to death. It's not the freshest production you'll hear all year, and the chorus is a way off deadly, but for a single from someone who owes his second shot at pop paydirt to a romance with a glamour model on a reality show where everyone gets upstaged by the dismembered dangly bits of a kangaroo, it's not half bad..

== Track listing ==
CD single (Exclusive To Asda)
No.	Title	Length
1.	"Defender"	3:14

Digital Single
No.	Title	Length
1.	"Defender"	3:14
2.	"Defender" (Candlelight Mix)	3:15
3.	"Defender" (Drastic Measures Mix)	4:33
4.	"Defender" (Video Mix)	3:33

== Charts ==
Chart performance for "Defender"
Chart (2010)	Peak position
Scottish Singles Sales (Official Charts)	32
UK Singles (Official Charts)	14
UK Indie (Official Charts)	2

== Release history ==
Release history and formats for "Defender"
Region	Date	Format	Label
United Kingdom	24 October 2010	Digital download	Conehead Management
United Kingdom	25 October 2010	CD single	Conehead Management
