= Kinnane =

Kinnane is a surname. Notable people with the surname include:

- Michael Kinnane (1889–1952), Irish civil servant
- The Kinnane Brothers, American filmmaking collective

== See also ==
- Kinane, another surname
