= Behind Closed Doors (Peter Andre song) =

Single by Peter Andre

from the album Revelation
- Released: 9 August 2009
- Recorded: 2009
- Genre: Pop, R&B
- Length: 3:23
- Label: Conehead
- Songwriters: Peter Andre, AC Burrell, Francesca Richard

Peter Andre singles chronology
"A Whole New World" (2006)	"Behind Closed Doors" (2009)	"Unconditional" (2009)

"Behind Closed Doors" is a single by British singer-songwriter Peter Andre, the first single from his sixth studio album Revelation. It was released on 9 August 2009. The song was written by Andre, AC Burrell and Francesca "Francci" Richard. The song had its first airplay on Chris Moyles' BBC Radio 1 show and received heavy airplay on music channels. The lyrics in the song reflect when Andre and Katie Price publicised their relationship which resulted in divorce in May 2009. He debuted the song at T4 on the Beach on 19 July 2009.

== Music video ==
The music video, based on the movie Stepford Wives, received its first play on 4music and was played all day every hour. It was the added to Andre's official YouTube channel on 4 August 2009. The video shows Andre as a photographer taking pictures of attractive women but when the pictures are developed it is seen that the women are in fact dead behind the eyes and are not what they seemed to be before the photos were taken.

== Charts ==
On 16 August 2009 the song debuted at number four on the UK Singles Chart, based on downloads only. The following week it dropped to number nine.

=== Weekly charts ===
Weekly chart performance for "Behind Closed Doors"
Chart (2009)	Peak position
UK Singles Chart	4
UK Indie (OCC)	1

=== Year-end charts ===
Year-end chart performance for "Behind Closed Doors"
Chart (2009)	Position
UK Singles Chart	188

== Release history ==
Release history for "Behind Closed Doors"
Country	Date
United Kingdom	9 August 2009
