= The Long Road Back =

Studio album by Peter Andre
- Released: 7 June 2004
- Recorded: 1996–2004
- Genre: Pop
- Length: 47:05
- Label: East West
- Producer: Peter Andre

Peter Andre chronology
The Very Best of Peter Andre: The Hits Collection (2002)	The Long Road Back (2004)	The Platinum Collection (2005)

Singles from The Long Road Back
- 1. "Mysterious Girl (2004)" Released: 22 February 2004; 2. "Insania" Released: 31 May 2004; 3. "The Right Way" Released: 6 September 2004

The Long Road Back is the fourth studio album released by British-Australian singer-songwriter Peter Andre. It spawned the singles "Mysterious Girl (2004)", which reached number one in the UK, "Insania" and "The Right Way", and reached the top 50 of the UK Albums Chart. It was certified gold by the British Phonographic Industry upon release.

== Background ==
Following seven years away from the music industry, Andre re-appeared when he became a contestant on the ITV1 reality show I'm A Celebrity, Get Me Out Of Here! During his time in the competition, Andre penned the song "Insania", which was written about his time in the jungle. When the competition ended, East West Records offered Andre a record deal, which would see him release a new album before the end of 2004. It was revealed that East West had acquired the rights to Andre's hit "Mysterious Girl" some months before, following the collapse of Andre's ex-record label Mushroom Records. In February 2004, as an attempt to re-publicise Andre, East West recorded a new remix of "Mysterious Girl", which was subtitled "2004", which was released on the 23rd as the album's first single. A week before the album's release, "Insania", the track penned by Andre during his time in the jungle, was released as the album's second single. The album was released on 7 June 2004, featuring both singles, ten new recordings and the original version of "Mysterious Girl". "The Right Way" was released as the album's third and final single on 7 December 2004. East West shipped over 60,000 copies and the album was certified Silver, though as of September 2009, it had only sold 15,069 copies. Andre was dropped from the label in early 2005.

== Track listing ==
The Long Road Back track listing
No.	Title	Writer(s)	Producer(s)	Length
1.	"Insania"	Peter Andre; Soren Elonsson	Elonsson; Niklas Andersson	3:06
2.	"You Got Me Thinking" (featuring She Hamilton)	Adrian Bailey; Alex James; Kerin Smith	Bailey; James; Smith	3:11
3.	"Never Gonna Give You Up"	Andre; Mich Hansen; Joe Belmaati; Remee	Cutfather & Joe	3:33
4.	"Mysterious Girl" (featuring Bubbler Ranx)	Andre; Ollie Jacobs; Phillip Jacobs; Glen Goldsmith; Bubbler Ranx	Ollie J	3:36
5.	"What Is Love?"	Hansen; Belmaati; Kara DioGuardi; Andreas Carlson	Cutfather & Joe	3:31
6.	"All Cried Out"	Andre; Danny O'Donoghue; Mark Sheehan; Eugene Wild	O'Donoghue; Sheehan	4:09
7.	"Let's Go Dancin' (Ooh La La La)"	Clifford Adams; Amir Bayyan; Eumir Deodato; Ronald Bell; George Brown; Robert "Kool" Bell; Robert Mickens; Michael Ray; Claydes Charles Smith; James "J.T." Taylor; Curtis Williams	Brian Rawling; Paul Meehan	3:44
8.	"All Time Girl"	Ricky Hanley; Darren Woodford; Harry Brookes	Radi8	3:35
9.	"That's Where I'll Belong"	Meehan; Tim Woodcock; Katherine Ellis	Rawling; Meehan	3:30
10.	"The Right Way"	Andre	David Tyson	4:39
11.	"World of Her Own" (featuring She Hamilton)	Andre; O. Jacobs; P. Jacobs; Moni Tivony; L. Smith; She Hamilton	Ollie J	4:09
12.	"Untouchable"	Andre; O'Donoghue; Sheehan; Bray Merritt	O'Donoghue; Sheehan	3:50
13.	"Mysterious Girl (2004)" (featuring Bubbler Ranx)	Andre; O. Jacobs; P. Jacobs; Goldsmith; Bubbler Ranx	Ollie J	3:50

== Charts ==
Chart performance for The Long Road Back
Chart (2004)	Peak position
Scottish Albums (OCC)	50
UK Albums (OCC)	44

== Certifications ==
Certifications for The Long Road Back
Region	Certification	Certified units/sales
United Kingdom (BPI)	Silver	60,000^{^}
^{^} Shipments figures based on certification alone.
