= Vow (song) =

1995 single by Garbage

- US single

Single by Garbage

from the album Garbage
- B-side: "Subhuman"; "#1 Crush"
- Released: March 20, 1995
- Recorded: March–September 1994
- Studio: Smart (Madison, Wisconsin)
- Genre: Alternative rock
- Length: 4:30
- Label: Discordant; Almo Sounds (North America)
- Songwriter: Garbage
- Producer: Garbage

Garbage singles chronology
"Vow" (1995)	"Subhuman" (1995)

Alternative cover
- UK single

"Vow" is a song by alternative rock band Garbage. It was released as their debut single in early 1995 by Discordant, a label set up by Mushroom Records to launch the group, and Almo Sounds in North America.

"Vow" was quietly licensed to a Volume magazine/CD sampler publication at the end of 1994; it was subsequently picked up and broadcast by BBC Radio 1 DJs Steve Lamacq and John Peel, and then playlisted by modern rock radio stations in Los Angeles and Seattle. "Vow" generated such significant buzz through positive reviews and word-of-mouth that it was eventually chosen as Garbage's first single release. After a low-key independent record label pressing in the United Kingdom, where it was packaged in a very limited edition logo embossed aluminium case, "Vow" went on to top the alternative charts in Australia and register on the Hot 100 singles chart in the United States.

The song began as a demo during sessions between band members Butch Vig, Duke Erikson and Steve Marker, and the composition finished after singer Shirley Manson joined the band. The lyrics for "Vow" deal with themes of revenge and retaliation, and were inspired by a newspaper article on domestic abuse. In 2007, "Vow" was remastered and included as the opening track on Garbage's greatest hits compilation, Absolute Garbage. The song was also included in Garbage's second greatest hits compilation The Absolute Collection, released in Australia and New Zealand in 2012, and was remastered again in 2022 to be included on the CD and streaming edition of the band's third greatest hits collection Anthology.

== Development and composition ==
"Vow" began in rough demo form in January 1994, as band members Butch Vig, Duke Erikson and Steve Marker performed sessions in Marker's basement recording studio and Vig and Marker's own Smart Studios business in Madison, Wisconsin. After Marker saw Shirley Manson's group Angelfish on 120 Minutes, the band invited Manson to Smart Studios to sing on a couple of tracks. After a dreadful first audition, she returned to Angelfish, which folded shortly thereafter. Manson decided to test for Garbage again, and after the successful second audition, she began to work on the then-skeletal "Queer" and "Vow". While performing "Vow", Manson ad-libbed the lyrics "I can't use what I can't abuse" and "like Joan of Arc coming back for more". The song is written in the key of A minor, set in time signature of common time with a tempo of 126 beats per minute. It opens with Erikson playing a guitar through a noise gate "with a lot of echo on it", and has a chord progression is A–C-F in the verses, D-B♭-A-Em-D-B♭-F in the bridge, and F-C-D-G in the chorus, with a segue into F♯ minor in the interlude.

"Vow"
Sample of "Vow", showcasing the song's distorted guitar riffs and vengeful lyrics.

According to Vig, the inspiration for the song was a newspaper article about a woman who had gone back to get revenge on an abusive husband, "so we thought it would be cool to get a bit of retribution in there." Vig also said he noted violence could also come from psychological standpoint by seeing the story of a sado-masochistic couple who could not keep away from each other. Lyrically, Manson claimed "'Vow' is about having feelings [of vengeance]. You have to face your feelings of revenge and work out why you feel that way. It's about that conundrum when you're really angry but in reality you're in a pitiful state. Angry, twisted, but deep down, vulnerable." During promotion for the song, Garbage joked to journalists that "Vow" was about John and Lorena Bobbitt.

Garbage had not initially planned to release "Vow" as their first single, as a single at all, or even include it on their debut album. The band felt that "Vow" was not representative of the album's genre-hopping body of work, although they later came to appreciate the situation that led to the song becoming their debut. Manson declared that "now we can do whatever and people won't know what to expect", but if the band had instead settled for "of the more clubby tunes" as a single, "we would have been pigeonholed as a dance band and that's a hard tag to shake".

== Single release ==
=== United Kingdom ===
Midway through the recording sessions for the band's debut album, the band's label, Mushroom Records, secured the group an inclusion on Volume, a magazine that released compilation albums. However, the deadline given for accepting a track was only three days. The only song the band had completed in any shape or form was "Vow". After Volume was released in December 1994, "Vow" began to receive radio airplay from BBC Radio 1 DJs Steve Lamacq, John Peel and Johnnie Walker, and record stores in the United Kingdom began to receive requests for a single that did not yet exist. Word-of-mouth on "Vow" took the track back to the United States, where KROQ-FM in Los Angeles and KNDD in Seattle discovered the song, and put it into rotation on their station playlists. By May 1995, alternative radio stations across the country had picked up on "Vow", and it began to receive heavy rotation nationwide. Garbage were still putting the finishing touches to their debut set, which was still three months away from release.

On the back of the surprise attention that "Vow" had garnered, the band's UK record label Mushroom were keen to capitalise on the song. The terms of the licensing deal regarding the inclusion of "Vow" on Volume meant that the track could only be released on a limited basis. Concerned that at the time that their label was only known in the UK for the Neighbours theme tune, Mushroom founded the Discordant label for the sole purpose of launching Garbage. Prior to its release "Vow" had already topped NME's playlist chart for 5 weeks and received "Single of the Week" status in seven publications.

On March 20, 1995 "Vow" was issued in a limited edition 7" vinyl format, backed with a remix of the title track and packaged in an embossed aluminium sleeve. A total of 1,000 copies were pressed, of which only 934 were made available to buy, barely enough to reach the U.K. Top 100. "Vow" sold out in one day. The single was the first of six specially packaged Garbage singles Mushroom Records released between 1995 and 1996, which were costly investment - posting a 70p per-unit loss on each single - but the investment paid off as each subsequent single became bigger hits. The limited pressing helped the "Vow" single to become a highly sought collectible, with copies selling for £100 by the time Mushroom launched follow-up single "Subhuman".

=== United States ===
From the week of April 24, both KROQ in Los Angeles and KNDD in Seattle added "Vow" to their station playlists. The track had been picked up by the station DJs on import. The following week, Q101 in Chicago did the same. "Vow" was officially serviced by Almo Sounds/Geffen to radio on June 5; by this time 34 radio stations were already playing it and it was racking up almost 500 plays a week. "Vow" debuted on the Modern Rock Tracks chart at #39 in mid-June 1995. On June 20, Almo Sounds released the track to record stores on CD and cassette single, both formats backed-with the band's own "Vow" remix, titled "Vow (Torn Apart)". On its fourth week, "Vow" rose to #26, before dropping the following week and returning for a second peak at the same position in mid-July. During this time, airplay and single sales of "Vow" led to the song registering at #5 on the Bubbling Under Hot 100 Singles, a chart which shows the most popular songs in the United States that have not yet reached the Billboard Hot 100. The same week that the track hit its second peak at alternative radio, "Vow" shot up to #1 on the Bubbling Under chart.

At the end of July, "Vow" debuted at #97 on the Hot 100, and due to being the only new entry on the list, broke the record for the lowest-ever "Hot Shot Debut" in the 37-year history of the Hot 100 chart. Billboard credited the song's debut on the charts to it being the most played record on the Austin radio station KNNC. "Vow" spent a second week at the #97 before leaving the Hot 100. By mid-August, "Vow" completed a nine-week run on the Modern Rock charts. Despite not being able to capitalize on the single's popularity at alternative radio, Almo Sounds released the band's self-titled debut album Garbage across the United States and Canada the following week, where it debuted at the end of the month on the developing artists Top Heatseekers album chart.

=== Other markets ===
Discordant's parent label Mushroom licensed "Vow" for distribution internationally at the same time as the North American release. In Australia and New Zealand, "Vow" was released by their White Records imprint; two CD singles, one of which was a limited edition packaged in an embossed rubber wallet; and a cassette single. All formats included two b-sides, both written during the sessions for the debut album: "Subhuman" and "#1 Crush". The single debuted at #53 on the Australian ARIA singles chart dated week ending August 20, 1995, and rose to #32 in its fifth week on the chart. In New Zealand, "Vow" debuted at #48 at the end of September, and peaked at #41 a week later. Mushroom also licensed "Vow" to local BMG labels across Europe and in South Africa as a CD single prior to the release of Garbage.

=== Aborted re-releases ===
Following the international release of "Vow", Mushroom Records planned to re-release the song in the UK; at the last minute, a decision was taken to issue "Subhuman" as the A-side, as they considered the song strong enough to support a single release. "Vow" was included as a bonus track on the "Subhuman" CD single. The "Vow" music video was sent to music channels to promote "Subhuman".

In 1996, when the band's third North American single "Only Happy When it Rains" had driven the sales of Garbage into the top half of the Billboard 200 for the first time, Almo Sounds considered re-releasing "Vow", feeling that on its initial release the song had not gotten a full chance at radio and video. Instead, the label ultimately chose to move forward with fourth single "Stupid Girl".

== Music video ==
The "Vow" music video marked the first time Garbage performed together live, and the band liked the experience enough to start touring.

The music video for "Vow" was directed by Samuel Bayer and filmed over 12 hours in Los Angeles at the start of June 1995. The video premiered in the United States on June 12, 1995.

A performance piece, the video features strobe lighting and falling glitter cut into shots of Garbage performing against a golden backdrop surrounded by television sets relaying real time footage of the band playing. Throughout the clip, there is also shots of a semi-naked man with running black eyeliner crawling on the floor, an Australian born actor and model named Greg Brown who appeared in other Samuel Bayer projects such as videos for David Bowie and Nirvana.

Bayer asked the group to perform "Vow" live while he filmed the takes for the video shoot. Garbage had never performed live as group prior to this, and had initially had not considered ever performing live onstage. "We set up amps and played the guitars. Butch was pounding away and Shirley had a live mic. After the first run-through, we all looked at each other and said, 'This feels really good.'" Erikson later recalled. The group enjoyed the experience of performing together so much that they quickly changed their minds, and scheduled tourdates later that year.

The "Vow" music video was first commercially released on VHS and Video-CD on 1996's Garbage Video. A remastered version was later included on Garbage's 2007 greatest hits DVD Absolute Garbage.

== Critical reception ==
"Vow" was acclaimed by critics. The song took on elements from various styles, including glam rock, punk, and art rock. The Times described it as "the missing link between Courtney Love and PJ Harvey" while Paul Yates of Q magazine said "Garbage's signature lies in songs like 'Vow', good pop tunes dealt a rough treatment and brazen vocals". NME's Emma Morgan wrote "it's the simplicity of the lyrics that strikes the winning goal", while earlier in the year NME had made "Vow" its Single of the Week, writing "["Vow" is] a shape-shifting squalling epic. It shimmers like Siouxsie's 'Christine'. It's a credit to the band's producing skills that such an ambitious thing is lashed together at all" Melody Maker also named "Vow" as Single of the Week, describing the song as "surreal pop heaven mixed with industrial nightmares". and later saying the song "has classic written all over it". Kerrang! magazine's Paul Rees described "Vow" as "edgy dislocated pop with a sparkling chorus" and "the most brilliant pop song of 1995". Select's Ian Harrison liked the song, but felt that it "pilfers from The Smiths 'How Soon Is Now?'". In a review for Billboard, Larry Flick rated "Vow" his Critic's Choice and wrote, "Move over Courtney Love. Garbage combine the tough-headed hooks of Hole with an unforgettable vocal prowl which rivals 'Miss World'. A numbed female vocal cries before a raging guitar riff begins to shatter a pain-filled pop texture. Commit to it." Dan Dinello, of Alternative Press, described "Vow" as "menacing tale of violence and revenge sounds like Patti Smith fronting The Clash while quoting the Beatles "No Reply"." Spin's Charles Aaron likened the band to "Bunnymen wannabes doing '90s reverb angst" and compared Erikson's guitar to Aldo Nova, but ultimately considered that "even though they sound totally prefab, the singer hints at a pleasantly pissed personality". Jude Rogers of The Guardian described the song as a "Kerrang-friendly rout of skronky rawk guitars, with Ms Manson offering a gentle hello: "I came to cut you UP/I came knock you DOWN/I came around to TEAR your little WORLD a-PART!"

"Vow" also appeared in a number of year-end lists: #45 in John Peel's Festive Fifty, #15 in Triple J's "Hottest 100 of 1995", and #66 in KROQ's "Top 106.7 of 1995".

== Track listings ==
- UK 7" vinyl, US CD and cassette single
1. "Vow" – 4:30
2. "Vow (Torn Apart)" – 5:09
- Europe and South Africa CD single,
  Australian CD/cassette single
1. "Vow" – 4:30
2. "Subhuman" – 4:36
3. "#1 Crush" – 4:52

== Credits and personnel ==
Garbage

- Shirley Manson – vocals, guitar
- Steve Marker – guitars, bass guitar, samples and loops
- Duke Erikson – guitars, keyboards, six-string and fuzz bass
- Butch Vig – drums, loops, noise and efx

Publishing

- Written by Garbage
- Copyright 1995 Vibecrusher Music / Irving Music, Inc (BMI) / Deadarm Music (ASCAP)

Production

- Recorded & produced by Garbage
- Recorded at Smart Studios in Madison, Wisconsin, USA
- Second engineer: Mike Zirkel
- Mastered: Howie Weinberg (Masterdisk)
- Editing & post production: Scott Hull (Masterdisk)

"Vow (Torn Apart)"

- Remix by Garbage

== Charts ==
Chart performance for "Vow"
Chart (1995)	Peak position
Australia Singles Chart (ARIA)	32
New Zealand Singles Chart (RIANZ)	41
United Kingdom Singles Chart (CIN)	138
US Billboard Hot 100	97
US Hot Modern Rock Tracks (Billboard)	26

== Release history ==
Release history and formats for "Vow"
Region	Date	Format(s)	Label	Ref.
United Kingdom	March 20, 1995	7-inch vinyl	Discordant	
United States	June 5, 1995	Alternative radio	Almo Sounds	
United States	June 20, 1995	CD; cassette	Almo Sounds	
Australia	August 7, 1995	CD; cassette	White	
