= Only One (Peter Andre song) =

1996 single by Peter Andre

Single by Peter Andre

from the album Natural
- Released: 4 March 1996
- Length: 3:52
- Label: Melodian, Mushroom UK
- Songwriters: Andre, Jacobs, Jacobs, Ogilvy
- Producer: Peter Andre

Peter Andre singles chronology
"Get Down on It" (1996)	"Only One" (1996)	"Flava" (1996)

"Only One" is the fourth overall single and second British single released by Australian singer Peter Andre from his second studio album, Natural. The single was released in the United Kingdom on 4 March 1996, as an alternative to the Australasian-only "Get Down on It", via Mushroom Records UK.

The song debuted and peaked at No. 16 on the UK Singles Chart the same month, and in July, it debuted at its peak of No. 5 in New Zealand, becoming Andre's third consecutive top-five hit in that country. It has received a gold certification in New Zealand for selling over 5,000 copies.

== Track listings ==
Australian CD single

1. "Only One"
2. "Gonna Get to You" (R'n'B edit)
3. "Only One" (Rapino Brothers dub mix)
4. "Only One" (Rapino Brothers club mix)

German maxi-CD single

1. "Only One"
2. "Only One" (Rapino Brothers club mix)
3. "Gonna Get to You"

UK cassette single

1. "Only One"
2. "Gimme Little Sign"

UK CD1

1. "Only One"
2. "Only One" (Rapino Brothers club mix)
3. "Gonna Get to You" – 4:34
4. Exclusive interview (part 1)

UK CD2

1. "Only One"
2. "Only One" (Rapino Brothers dub mix)
3. "Let's Get It On"
4. Exclusive interview (part 2)

== Charts ==
Chart (1996)	Peak position
Australia (ARIA)	58
Europe (Eurochart Hot 100)	83
Netherlands (Single Top 100)	94
New Zealand (Recorded Music NZ)	5
Scotland (OCC)	19
UK Singles (OCC)	16
UK Airplay (Music Week)	25

== Certifications ==
Region	Certification	Certified units/sales
New Zealand (RMNZ)	Gold	5,000^{*}
^{*} Sales figures based on certification alone.

== Release history ==
Region	Date	Format(s)	Label(s)	Ref.
United Kingdom	4 March 1996	CD; cassette	Mushroom UK	
Australia	19 May 1996	CD	Melodian	
