= Flava (song) =

1996 single by Peter Andre

Single by Peter Andre

from the album Natural
- B-side: "To the Top"
- Released: 2 September 1996
- Genre: R&B
- Length: 3:35
- Label: Melodian; Mushroom
- Songwriters: Peter Andre; Andy Whitmore; Wayne Hector; Cee
- Producer: Andy Whitmore

Peter Andre singles chronology
"Only One" (1996)	"Flava" (1996)	"I Feel You" (1996)

"Flava" is a song by English-Australian singer-songwriter Peter Andre, released by Melodian and Mushroom as the fifth single from Andre's second studio album, Natural (1996). The song includes a rap by American rapper Cee and spent one week at number one on the UK Singles Chart in September 1996, becoming Andre's first number-one single in the UK. "Flava" also reached top 10 in Denmark, the Netherlands, New Zealand, Sweden, and the Wallonia region of Belgium.

== Critical reception ==
Kevin Courtney from Irish Times commented, "The man with the six pack stomach and the penchant for nursery rhyme reggae tunes returns with a rapping sort of tune in the vein of Backstreet Boys. This one is not quite as irritating as 'Mysterious Girl', but the thought of more video close ups of Mr Andre's abs is just too horrible to contemplate." British magazine Music Week gave the song a score of four out of five, writing, "Matching 'Mysterious Girl' is going to be tough, but 'Flava' has a warm R&B sound, a catchy chorus and enough class to become another winner."

== Track listings ==
- 7-inch and cassette single
1. "Flava" (7-inch edit)
2. "To the Top"
- European and Australian CD1
1. "Flava" (radio 7-inch edit) – 4:01
2. "Flava" (Benz mix) – 4:05
3. "Flava" (Richie P mix) – 4:01
4. "Flava" (Crichton & Morris 12-inch mix) – 6:18
- European and Australian CD2
1. "Flava" (radio 7-inch edit) – 4:01
2. "Flava" (Slammin' 12-inch) – 6:49
3. "Flava" (Crichton & Morris 7-inch mix) – 4:41
4. "Flava" (Jungle mix) – 5:10

== Charts ==
=== Weekly charts ===
Chart (1996)	Peak position
Australia (ARIA)	62
Belgium (Ultratop 50 Flanders)	27
Belgium (Ultratop 50 Wallonia)	8
Denmark (IFPI)	10
Estonia (Eesti Top 20)	20
Europe (Eurochart Hot 100)	10
Europe (European Hit Radio)	18
Finland (Suomen virallinen lista)	16
Germany (GfK)	25
Iceland (Íslenski Listinn Topp 40)	18
Ireland (IRMA)	10
Israel (IBA)	5
Netherlands (Dutch Top 40)	7
Netherlands (Single Top 100)	5
New Zealand (Recorded Music NZ)	8
Scotland Singles (Official Charts)	1
Sweden (Sverigetopplistan)	8
Switzerland (Schweizer Hitparade)	40
UK Singles (Official Charts)	1
UK Airplay (Music Week)	7
UK Pop Tip Club Chart (Music Week)	17

=== Year-end charts ===
Chart (1996)	Position
Belgium (Ultratop 50 Wallonia)	71
Israel (IBA)	39
Netherlands (Dutch Top 40)	93
Netherlands (Single Top 100)	90
Sweden (Topplistan)	65
UK Singles (OCC)	33

== Certifications ==
Region	Certification	Certified units/sales
United Kingdom (BPI)	Silver	200,000^{^}
^{^} Shipments figures based on certification alone.
