= Natural (Peter Andre album) =

Studio album by Peter Andre
- Released: 18 March 1996
- Recorded: 1995
- Genre: Pop; R&B
- Length: 50:08
- Label: Melodian; Mushroom
- Producer: Peter Andre; Ashley Cadell; Cutfather & Joe; Mark Forrester; Nicky Graham; Deni Lew; Nigel Lowis; Ollie J; Mykaell Riley; Nu-O; Andy Whitmore

Peter Andre chronology
Peter Andre (1993)	Natural (1996)	Time (1997)

Singles from Natural
- 1. "Turn It Up" Released: 29 May 1995; 2. "Mysterious Girl" Released: 14 August 1995; 3. "Get Down on It" Released: 12 February 1996; 4. "Only One" Released: 4 March 1996; 5. "Flava" Released: 2 September 1996; 6. "I Feel You" Released: 25 November 1996; 7. "Natural" Released: 24 February 1997

Professional ratings
Review scores
Source	Rating
AllMusic	4/5 stars
The Guardian	2/5 stars
Music Week	5/5 stars

Natural is the second studio album released by British-Australian singer-songwriter Peter Andre, released on 18 March 1996 in Australia and in September 1996 in the UK and Europe. Seven singles were released from the album, including the international hit "Mysterious Girl" and the UK number ones "Flava" and "I Feel You". The album debuted at number one on the UK Albums Chart, and was certified platinum by the British Phonographic Industry (BPI) for shipments of over 300,000 units in the UK.

== Background ==
Following the success of his first album in Australia, Andre was commissioned to record a second album with Melodian. However, Melodian believed that it would be wise to see if he could break the British market as well. Andre signed a joint deal with Melodian and the British record label, Mushroom UK, for his second studio album to be released in both markets. On 29 May 1995, "Turn It Up" was released. However, the record deal with Mushroom soon came under jeopardy when the label went into administration. Melodian pressed ahead with releases in Australia, releasing "Mysterious Girl" on 14 August 1995.

In January 1996, Mushroom announced that it had found a buyer for the label, meaning that it would not have to close, and that the joint deal was still in place. At this point, preparations for the album's release had been made in Australia. Three weeks before the album's release in Australia, on 12 February 1996, "Get Down on It" was released, peaking inside the top 10 of the ARIA Singles Chart. On 4 March 1996, Mushroom announced plans to continue with its releases and the second British single, "Only One", was released. On 18 March 1996, Natural was released in Australia. Mushroom announced plans to release "Mysterious Girl" as the third British single on 24 May 1996; it had not been released on the British market due to ongoing issues over the record deal. Mushroom also announced that, due to the problems caused by the label's proposed closure, it would be reworking the album for the British market. On 2 September 1996, "Flava" was released as a single, and three weeks later, the album was released. On the week of release, the album sold 200,000 copies, and become the fastest-selling album of the year. Two further singles—"I Feel You" and "Natural"—were released; the former song was issued on 25 November 1996 and the latter was issued on 24 February 1997. Both entered the top 20 of the UK singles chart.

== Track listing ==
Australian edition
No.	Title	Writer(s)	Producer(s)	Length
1.	"Mysterious Girl" (featuring Bubbler Ranx)	Peter Andre; Ollie Jacobs; Phillip Jacobs; Glen Goldsmith; Bubbler Ranx	Ollie J	3:43
2.	"Natural"	Andre; O. Jacobs; P. Jacobs; Goldsmith	Cutfather & Joe	3:47
3.	"Flavour of the Year" (featuring Cee)	Andre; Andy Whitmore; Wayne Hector; Cee	Whitmore	4:00
4.	"All I Ever Wanted"	Andre; Deni Lew; Nicky Graham; Hector	Graham; Lew^{[a]}	3:38
5.	"Tell Me When"	Andre	Whitmore	3:48
6.	"Turn It Up" (featuring Ollie J)	Andre; O. Jacobs; P. Jacobs; Mark Walcot; Goldsmith	Ollie J	3:24
7.	"Message to My Girl"	Neil Finn	Nigel Lowis	4:12
8.	"You Are (Part One)"	Andre	Whitmore	1:53
9.	"Only One"	Andre; O. Jacobs; P. Jacobs; Ogilvy	Ollie J; Mykaell Riley^{[a]}	3:52
10.	"Get Down on It" (featuring Past to Present)	Bell; Bell; Taylor; George Brown; Hickens; Otha Nash; Larry Gittens; Dennis Thomas; Smith; Ricky West	Andre; Nu-O	4:47
Total length:				37:04

European edition
No.	Title	Writer(s)	Producer(s)	Length
1.	"Flava" (featuring Cee)	Peter Andre; Andy Whitmore; Wayne Hector; Cee	Whitmore	3:55
2.	"Natural" (C&J street mix)	Andre; Ollie Jacobs; Phillip Jacobs; Glen Goldsmith	Cutfather & Joe	4:22
3.	"Mysterious Girl" (featuring Bubbler Ranx)	Peter Andre; O. Jacobs; P. Jacobs; Goldsmith; Bubbler Ranx	Ollie J	3:43
4.	"I Feel You"	Andre; Terry "Juice" Jones; Goldsmith	Cutfather & Joe	5:02
5.	"You Are (Part Two)"	Andre	Whitmore	2:04
6.	"All I Ever Wanted"	Andre; Deni Lew; Nicky Graham; Hector	Graham; Lew^{[a]}	3:38
7.	"Show U Somethin'"	Andre; Richard Pascoe; Hector	Richie D	3:19
8.	"To the Top"	Andre; Ashley Cadell	Cadell; Mark Forrester	4:02
9.	"Tell Me When"	Andre	Whitmore	3:48
10.	"Only One"	Andre; O. Jacobs; P. Jacobs; Ogilvy	Ollie J; Mykaell Riley^{[a]}	3:52
11.	"Message to My Girl"	Neil Finn	Nigel Lowis	4:12
12.	"Turn It Up" (featuring Ollie J)	Andre; O. Jacobs; P. Jacobs; Mark Walcot; Goldsmith	Ollie J	3:24
13.	"Get Down on It" (featuring Past to Present; not included on digital versions)	Bell; Bell; Taylor; George Brown; Hickens; Otha Nash; Larry Gittens; Dennis Thomas; Smith; Ricky West	Andre; Nu-O	4:47
Total length:				50:08

- Natural: The Video
1. "Turn It Up" (video)
2. "Only One" (video)
3. "To the Top" (video)
4. "Mysterious Girl" (Video)
5. "Flava" (video)
6. "I Feel You" (video)
7. "All I Ever Wanted" (video)
8. "Natural" (video)
9. "I Feel You" (unplugged)

Notes

- ^{^[a]} signifies an additional producer

== Charts ==
=== Weekly charts ===
Weekly chart performance for Natural
Chart (1996)	Peak position
Australian Albums (ARIA)	11
Austrian Albums (Ö3 Austria)	28
Belgian Albums (Ultratop Flanders)	31
Belgian Albums (Ultratop Wallonia)	24
Dutch Albums (Album Top 100)	8
European Albums Chart	14
Finnish Albums (Suomen virallinen lista)	37
German Albums (Offizielle Top 100)	28
New Zealand Albums (RMNZ)	3
Scottish Albums (OCC)	9
Swedish Albums (Sverigetopplistan)	11
Swiss Albums (Schweizer Hitparade)	11
UK Albums (OCC)	1

=== Year-end charts ===
Year-end chart performance for Natural
Chart (1996)	Position
Dutch Album Chart	77
New Zealand Albums Chart	18
UK Albums Chart	39

== Certifications and sales ==
Certifications and sales for Natural
Region	Certification	Certified units/sales
Netherlands (NVPI)	Gold	50,000^{^}
New Zealand (RMNZ)	Platinum	15,000^{^}
Poland (ZPAV)	Gold	50,000^{*}
United Kingdom (BPI)	Platinum	309,456
Summaries
Worldwide	—	600,000
^{*} Sales figures based on certification alone.^{^} Shipments figures based on certification alone.
