= Insania =

2004 single by Peter Andre

Single by Peter Andre

from the album The Long Road Back
- Released: 31 May 2004
- Length: 3:06
- Label: EastWest
- Songwriters: Peter Andre; Soren Elonsson
- Producers: Soren Elonsson; Niklas Andersson

Peter Andre singles chronology
| "Mysterious Girl" (2004) | "Insania" (2004) | "The Right Way" (2004) |

"Insania" is a song by British-Australian singer Peter Andre, released as the second single from his fourth studio album, The Long Road Back. The single was released on 31 May 2004 through EastWest Records. Andre falsely claimed to have written the song whilst appearing as a contestant on series three of the British version of I'm a Celebrity...Get Me Out of Here! The song peaked at number three on the UK Singles Chart and number 14 in Ireland. In 2016, Andre admitted that he was "really embarrassed" by the song, calling it his "silliest professional mistake".

== Track listings ==
UK CD single

1. "Insania" – 3:06
2. "Insania" (Element remix) – 6:31

UK DVD single

1. "Insania" (video) – 3:02
2. "Mysterious Girl" (video) – 3:38
3. "Insania" (making of the video)
4. "Insania" (audio) – 3:06

Australian CD single

1. "Insania" – 3:06
2. "Insania" (Element remix) – 6:31
3. "Mysterious Girl 2004" – 3:50
4. "Insania" (video) – 3:02

== Charts ==
=== Weekly charts ===
Weekly chart performance for "Insania"
| Chart (2004) | Peak position |
|---|---|
| Australia (ARIA Charts) | 108 |
| Europe (Eurochart Hot 100) | 11 |
| Ireland (IRMA) | 14 |
| Scotland Singles (OCC) | 3 |
| UK Singles (OCC) | 3 |

=== Year-end charts ===
Year-end chart performance for "Insania"
| Chart (2004) | Position |
|---|---|
| UK Singles (OCC) | 117 |

== Release history ==
Release dates and formats for "Insania"
| Region | Date | Format(s) | Label(s) | Ref. |
|---|---|---|---|---|
| United Kingdom | 31 May 2004 | CD; DVD | EastWest | |
| Australia | 23 August 2004 | CD | Warner Music Australia | |
