= All Night, All Right =

1998 single by Peter Andre

Single by Peter Andre featuring Warren G

from the album Time
- Released: 12 January 1998
- Length: 3:29
- Label: Mushroom
- Songwriters: Peter Andre; Atris Ivey; Montell Jordan; Juan Carlos Vercher; Perry Kibble
- Producer: Steve Kipner

Peter Andre singles chronology
"Lonely" (1997)	"All Night, All Right" (1998)	"Kiss the Girl" (1998)

Warren G singles chronology
"Prince Igor" (1997)	"All Night, All Right" (1998)	"Nobody Does It Better" (1998)

"All Night, All Right" is a song by British-Australian singer Peter Andre featuring Warren G. It was released in January 1998 by Mushroom Records as the third and final single from Andre's third studio album, Time (1997). The album version features Coolio. "All Night, All Right" peaked at number sixteen on the UK Singles Chart. It also peaked at number 13 in New Zealand and 30 in Australia.

== Critical reception ==
In an album review, Brendan Swift from AllMusic said "'All Night, All Right' featuring Coolio, is perhaps the best of the album" calling it "a slick up-tempo dance outing with liberal doses of funk". British Music Week gave the song three out of five, writing, "After the lethargic "Lonely", Andre bounces back with some solid funk based on disco classic "Boogie Oogie Oogie" and featuring a Warren G rap. Should secure Andre a return to the Top 10."

== Track listings ==
- Maxi single CD1
1. "All Night All Right" (radio edit) – 3:29
2. "All Night All Right" (Brooklyn Funk Club mix) – 4:51
3. "All Night All Right" (Brooklyn Funk R&B mix) – 4:54
4. "All Night All Right" (Damien's Late Night Jam) – 5:28
- Maxi single CD2
1. "All Night All Right" (radio edit) – 3:29
2. "All Night All Right" (Forthright Classy Club mix) – 8:17
3. "All Night All Right" (Forthright Slamming Dub B mix) – 7:08
4. "All Night All Right" (Stu Allan & Peter Pritchard mix) – 7:01

== Charts ==
Weekly chart performance for "All Night, All Right"
Chart (1998)	Peak position
Australia (ARIA)	30
Belgium (Ultratop 50 Flanders)	49
Estonia (Eesti Top 20)	10
Europe (Eurochart Hot 100)	76
Germany (GfK)	74
Iceland (Íslenski Listinn Topp 40)	40
Netherlands (Dutch Top 40)	29
Netherlands (Single Top 100)	41
New Zealand (Recorded Music NZ)	13
Scotland Singles (Official Charts)	23
Sweden (Sverigetopplistan)	48
UK Singles (Official Charts)	16
UK Airplay (Music Week)	25
UK Hip Hop/R&B (Official Charts)	4
