= Lonely (Peter Andre song) =

1997 single by Peter Andre

Single by Peter Andre

from the album Time
- B-side: "Just for You"; "You Are" (live); "Lonely" (live)
- Released: 27 October 1997
- Length: 3:57
- Label: Mushroom
- Songwriters: Peter Andre; Joe Belmaati; Mich Hansen
- Producer: Cutfather & Joe

Peter Andre singles chronology
| "All About Us" (1997) | "Lonely" (1997) | "All Night, All Right" (1998) |

"Lonely" is a song by British-Australian singer Peter Andre, released in October 1997 by Mushroom Records as the second single from Andre's third studio album, Time (1997). "Lonely" peaked at number six on the UK Singles Chart, becoming his sixth top-10 single. Music Week viewed the song as "lethargic".

== Track listings ==
- UK CD1
1. "Lonely" (radio edit)
2. "Just for You" (live at Wembley)
3. "You Are" (live at Wembley)
4. "Lonely" (live at Wembley)
- UK CD2
1. "Lonely" (radio edit)
2. "Just for You" (album version)
3. "Lonely" (a cappella)
4. "Lonely" (the video)
- UK cassette single and European CD single
1. "Lonely" (radio edit)
2. "Just for You" (album version)

== Charts ==
=== Weekly charts ===
Weekly chart performance for "Lonely"
| Chart (1997) | Peak position |
|---|---|
| Europe (Eurochart Hot 100) | 71 |
| Scotland Singles (Official Charts) | 12 |
| UK Singles (Official Charts) | 6 |
| UK Airplay (Music Week) | 45 |
| UK Indie (Official Charts) | 1 |

=== Year-end charts ===
Year-end chart performance for "Lonely"
| Chart (1997) | Position |
|---|---|
| UK Singles (OCC) | 192 |
