= Kid (Peter Andre song) =

Single by Peter Andre

from the album Mr. Peabody & Sherman and Big Night
- Released: 9 February 2014
- Recorded: 2013
- Genre: Pop
- Length: 2:58
- Label: Andre Music
- Songwriter: Peter Andre

Peter Andre singles chronology
"Bad as You Are" (2012)	"Kid" (2014)	"Big Night" (2014)

"Kid" is a song by British Australian singer and songwriter Peter Andre. The song was released in the United Kingdom on 9 February 2014 as the lead single from his tenth studio album Big Night (2014). The song peaked at number 144 on the UK Singles Chart. The song was chosen for the 2014 DreamWorks Animation movie Mr. Peabody & Sherman and was also used in the Autumn Iceland TV commercials.

== Music video ==
A music video to accompany the release of "Kid" was first released onto YouTube on 31 January 2014 at a total length of three minutes and three seconds.

== Chart performance ==
Chart performance for "Kid"
Chart (2013)	Peak position
UK Singles (Official Charts Company)	144

== Release history ==
Release history and formats for "Kid"
Region	Date	Format	Label
United Kingdom	9 February 2014	Digital download	Andre Music
