= Come Fly with Me (1958 TV program) =

Canadian music variety show

- Genre: Music
- Presented by: Shane Rimmer
- Country of origin: Canada
- Original language: English
- No. of seasons: 1

Production
- Producer: Jim Guthro
- Running time: 30 minutes

Original release
- Network: CBC Television
- Release: 24 June – 16 September 1958

Come Fly With Me is a Canadian music variety show that aired on CBC Television in 1958.

== Premise ==
This program replaced Front Page Challenge between the 1957 and 1958 television seasons. It was recorded in various international locations such as Banff, Edinburgh, Los Angeles, New York City, Niagara Falls, Paris, Rome, San Francisco and Vancouver. Host Shane Rimmer was joined by Don Wright's vocal group and Rudy Toth's orchestra.

The debut episode (24 June 1958) featured guest Barry Morse who sang the My Fair Lady musical number "Why Can't the English".

== Scheduling ==
This half-hour program was broadcast Tuesdays at 8:00 p.m. (Eastern) from 24 June to 16 September 1958.
