= Unconditional (Peter Andre song) =

Single by Peter Andre

from the album Revelation
- Released: 9 November 2009
- Recorded: 2009
- Genre: Pop, R&B
- Length: 4:04
- Label: Conehead
- Songwriters: Peter Andre, Kevin McPherson, AC Burrell, Francesca Richard, C. Syndor

Peter Andre singles chronology
"Behind Closed Doors" (2009)	"Unconditional" (2009)	"I Can't Make You Love Me" (2010)

"Conditional" is the second single from Australian pop-R&B singer Peter Andre's sixth studio album, Revelation (2009). The song is known for describing his relationship with ex-stepson Harvey Price, meaning his relationship with Harvey was dependent on his relationship with Harvey’s mother.

== Background ==
The song is very personal, written by Andre himself depicting his relationship with stepson Harvey Price, who is the son of his ex-wife Katie Price. Andre says that he "became a dad before he learnt how to be a father", meaning that Harvey taught him how not to be a dad before actually becoming a biological dad to Junior and Princess Tiaamii.

== Music video ==
The video features Andre performing the song in an empty large cinema. As Andre is performing various images and clips of children with or without their parents are projected on the wall behind him. Towards the end of the song members of a choir come out and stand along the steps of the cinema and sing the song alongside Andre.

== Track listing ==
1. "Unconditional" (Radio Edit) - 3:37

== Chart performance ==
The song debuted ahead of its release at #98. It rose eight places to #90 the following week, and then, in the week of its release, charted at #50, despite having been predicted as #1 by The Sun and Digital Spy, and many fans. The song fell to #80 the following week.

Chart (2009)	Peak position
UK Singles Chart	50
UK Indie Chart	6

== Release history ==
Country	Date
United Kingdom	November 9, 2009
