= Angels & Demons (album) =

Studio album by Peter Andre
- Released: 29 October 2012
- Recorded: 2012
- Genre: Pop, R&B, dance
- Length: 43:58
- Label: Snapper Records, Burning Shed
- Producer: Simon Britton, Ronnie Wilson, Nasri, Jaylien Wesley, Rich King

Peter Andre chronology
Accelerate (2010)	Angels & Demons (2012)	Big Night (2014)

Singles from Angels & Demons
- 1. "Bad As You Are" Released: 22 October 2012

Angels & Demons is the eighth studio album released by Australian singer-songwriter Peter Andre. The album was released on 29 October 2012, and was preceded by the lead single, "Bad as You Are".

== Background ==
The tracks on the album "reveal Peter as a stronger, more mature vocalist, as he takes his sound into exciting new musical genres. A move that promises to impress even the most hardened of Andre critics and delight existing fans, whilst simultaneously reaching out to new listening audiences." The album was recorded in both the United Kingdom and United States, and reportedly "hits hard with stronger, more mature vocals and successfully explores surprising new musical dimensions. Moving forward from the uniquely Britishness of his previous album, the album traverses the full musical spectrum." For the album, Andre collaborated with a number of legendary hit writers and producers, including Nasri, known for his work with Justin Bieber, Chris Brown and Simon Britton (Run D.M.C./Boyz II Men). He also collaborated with Jaylien Wesley, known for his work with Akon, Cheryl Cole, Will.i.am, etc.

The Executive Producers of the Album were Simon Britton and Ronnie Wilson.

The album is described as "the record which brings Peter's musical career to its absolute pinnacle. With a substantial marketing campaign in place to support the launch, Andre seizes this fresh opportunity to present us all with something totally new. New label, new image, incredible new sound." The album will be supported by a nationwide 31-date tour of the United Kingdom, taking place over three months between December 2012 and February 2013, playing a variety of Up Close and Personal dates.

Peter stated in an interview that; "This album is like nothing that I've ever made before. I've explored new genre territories and my voice has matured and strengthened. Fans and industry should prepare to hear something very different from me in this album. I’m so excited by the way it’s shaping up that I’ve decided to create a special deluxe edition for the fans. The deluxe fan’s edition of the album will be in a beautiful hardback book with exclusive pictures – and the best bit is it gives me the chance to thank each one of you personally. I just can’t wait for you all to hear it."

A deluxe fan's edition of the album is available to purchase exclusively via Burning Shed. The fan's edition features include; the album packaged in a deluxe hardback book; those who purchased the edition before 29 September having their name printed inside; bonus tracks; exclusive pictures; and a full hand-written lyric sheet. Those who did not have the chance to have their name printed inside the booklet will feature on a dedicated fan page on Andre's website, which will feature the names of those customers. The list will be published online on 29 October. The Album was certified by IMPALA with a Silver Sales Award.

== Singles ==
- "Bad As You Are" was the first track to be lifted from the album. Described as a "vibrant R&B anthem". The video for the track was recorded on 8 October 2012, and revealed on 22 October. The video features Andre performing the track in a hotel room, surrounded by images of an ex-girlfriend.

== Track listing ==
The album's track listing was confirmed by HMV. 30 second snippets of "What A Girl", "Bad As You Are" and "X" appeared on Peter's SoundCloud account prior to the album's release. "Fly Away" was originally set to feature a verse from rapper Talib Kweli, however, it was later revealed that Kweli's verse was taken without consent by Andre's producers, from one of Kweli's mixtape recordings, without Andre knowing. A solo version of the track was instead included on the album. "Lift The Sky" is listed on the album cover as a dedication to Andre's two children, Junior and Princess, and his stepson, Harvey.

No.	Title	Writer(s)	Producer(s)	Length
1.	"What A Girl"	Grant Black; Omar Mushtaq; Paul Lewis	Black; Mushtaq	3:12
2.	"Bad As You Are"	Rich King; Kristen "Kay Kola" Cole; Curtis "Sauce" Wilson	King; Wilson	3:41
3.	"Angels & Demons"	Black; Mushtaq; Lewis; Peter Andre; Chris Andre; Dante Johnson; Rawk Nait	Black; Mushtaq	3:25
4.	"Fly Away"	Simon Britton; Joel Bogen; Daniel Walker Raiyn	Raiyn	5:32
5.	"Don't Be Afraid"	P. Andre; Nasri Atweh; Adam Messinger; Fenrick Gibbs; E. Gaines	The Messengers	4:04
6.	"Make Her Mine"	King	King	3:33
7.	"Not A Love Song"	Ali Tennant; Matthew Gerrard	Gerrard	3:15
8.	"X" (featuring Lisa Maffia)	P. Andre; Britton; Lisa Maffia; Ronnie Wilson; Wayne Hernandez; Mercellus Fernandes; Tyler Lee Daley	Britton	4:04
9.	"Don't Give Up"	P. Andre; Victoria "Lady V" Horn; Jaylien Wesley	Wesley	3:32
10.	"Ignition"	P. Andre; Ryan Jackson; Gulza Lally; Nick Amour	Let's Throw Shapes	3:31
11.	"Analogue is Dead"	P. Andre; Britton; Wilson; Fernandes; Aaron Greenwood; Jeff Russell	Britton; Smasher	3:25
12.	"Lift the Sky"	Black; Mushtaq; Lewis	Black; Mushtaq	4:19
13.	"Thank You"	P. Andre; C. Andre; Britton; Wilson	P. Andre; C. Andre; Britton; Wilson	3:57
14.	"Enemy"	King; Brigg Sterns	King	4:18

Angels & Demons – Tesco bonus track
No.	Title	Writer(s)	Producer(s)	Length
13.	"Make Her Mine" (Soca Bassline Mix)	King	King; Soca Bassline (remix)	5:42

== Charts ==
Chart (2012)	Peak position
Scottish Albums Chart	35
UK Albums Chart	18

== Release history ==
Region	Date	Format	Label
Ireland	29 October 2012	CD, Digital download	Snapper Records, Burning Shed
United Kingdom	29 October 2012	CD, Digital download	Snapper Records, Burning Shed
