= Accelerate (Peter Andre album) =

Studio album by Peter Andre
- Released: 1 November 2010
- Recorded: 2009–2010
- Genre: Pop, R&B
- Length: 37:48
- Label: Conehead Management Ltd

Peter Andre chronology
Unconditional: Love Songs (2010)	Accelerate (2010)	Angels & Demons (2012)

Singles from Accelerate
- 1. "Defender" Released: 24 October 2010; 2. "Perfect Night" Released: 2 July 2011

Accelerate is the seventh album released by British-Australian singer-songwriter Peter Andre.

== Background ==
The album was released on 1 November 2010, preceded by the lead single, Defender. To create a fresh & uniquely British sounding record, Peter enlisted the help of modern music producers Taio Cruz, Guy Chambers & Labrinth, as well as the emerging talents of Dantae Johnson & Marcus Jay, who collectively wrote & produced a large portion of the album at MADM Studios owned and managed by writer producer Anthony Goldsbrough AKA Goldzbrough. The album features ten tracks as standard – however, two supermarkets are offering retailer-exclusive editions of the album, each packaged with one different bonus track and poster per supermarket. Thus, fans are encouraged to find and collect both versions of the album. The album peaked at No. 10 on the UK Albums Chart, with sales of over 125,000 copies. The album's second single, "Perfect Night", was confirmed for release on 2 July 2011. The video premiered on 9 June 2011.

== Reception ==
The Allmusic review by Jon O'Brien awarded the album 3.5 stars stating "The synth-heavy uptempo tracks "Kiss and Tell" and "After the Love" are reminiscent of Jay Sean's transatlantic club anthems, "XLR8" and "Under My Skin" echo the funk-pop of Justin Timberlake's last effort, while there are songs co-penned by the likes of chart-toppers Labyrinth and Taio Cruz. Only lead single "Defender," an homage to Janet Jackson's "Rhythm Nation," harks back to the formulaic, watered-down R&B of his previous work. Even the ballads, usually the nadir of any Peter Andre album, are dragged kicking and screaming into the new decade, thanks to the clattering beats of the Ryan Tedder-inspired "Perfect Night" and the Ne-Yo-esque seductive slow jams, "Wondergirl" and "Prisoner." Without the baggage of his naff early singles and tabloid headlines, Accelerate would undoubtedly earn more credibility and acclaim than it will inevitably receive.".

Professional ratings
Review scores
Source	Rating
Allmusic	3.5/5 stars

== Track listing ==
No.	Title	Writer(s)	Producer(s)	Length
1.	"XLR8"	Peter Andre; Dantae Johnson; Julian 2kriss Burnett; J2K	Johnson; Burnett	3:31
2.	"Defender"	Andre; Johnson; Nait Rawknait Masuku	Johnson; Masuku	3:12
3.	"Under My Skin"	Andre; Pete 'Boxsta' Martin; Tim Woodcock; Warren Askew	Martin	3:12
4.	"Perfect Night"	Taio Cruz; Guy Chambers	Martin	3:52
5.	"After the Love"	Andre; Johnson; Askew; Marcus Jay; Graham Stokes	Johnson; Jay	3:48
6.	"Wondergirl"	Andre; Jo Perry; Jud Mahoney; St. Nick; Bradley McIntosh	Martin; Jay; Perry	3:56
7.	"Kiss & Tell"	Andre; Johnson; Jay	Johnson; Jay	3:59
8.	"Prisoner (DOA)"	Martin; Ruth-Anne Cunningham; Andrew Frampton	Martin	3:38
9.	"Cry in Public"	Andre; Labrinth; Natalia Cappuccini	Martin	3:36
10.	"Mercy on Me"	Andre; Jack Vasilliou; Laura Vasilliou	Jack Vasilliou	5:00

Asda bonus track
No.	Title	Writer(s)	Producer(s)	Length
11.	"Every Moment"	Dan 'Hygrade' Trainor; Kingsley Brown Jr.	Trainor	4:17

Tesco bonus track
No.	Title	Writer(s)	Producer(s)	Length
11.	"Piano"	Martin; Thomas Jules	Martin	3:42

== Charts ==
Chart (2010)	Peak position
European Top 100 Albums	36
Scottish Albums Chart	20
UK Album Charts	10
UK Download Chart	6
UK Independent Chart	1

== Certifications ==
Country	Provider	Sales	Certification
United Kingdom	BPI	125,000	Gold
