= Perfect Night (Peter Andre song) =

Single by Peter Andre

from the album Accelerate
- Released: 3 July 2011
- Recorded: 2011
- Length: 3:40
- Label: Conehead Management
- Songwriters: Taio Cruz, Guy Chambers
- Producer: Pete Boxta Martin

Peter Andre singles chronology
"Defender" (2010)	"Perfect Night" (2011)	"Bad As You Are" (2012)

"Perfect Night" is the second single from British recording artist Peter Andre's seventh studio album, Accelerate. The single was released on 3 July 2011 via digital download, with a physical release following a day later, exclusive to retailer QVC. The song was written by Taio Cruz and Guy Chambers, and was produced by Pete "Boxsta" Martin. The song has been heavily mixed for the single release.

== Background ==
On 31 March 2011 Andre performed the song at the Children's Champion Awards in London. Andre has also performed the song on Daybreak and This Morning. The video for the song features footage from Andre's live tour performances, as well as the home studio sessions where he recorded a remixed version of the song. The video premiered on Starz on 10 June 2011. The song was also featured in his reality show and shown behind the scenes of the video.

== Track listing ==
Digital Download
No.	Title	Length
1.	"Perfect Night" (Single Remix)	3:40
2.	"Perfect Night" (Acoustic Version)	4:01

CD Single (Exclusive To QVC)
No.	Title	Length
1.	"Perfect Night" (Single Remix)	3:40
2.	"Perfect Night" (Acoustic Version)	4:01
3.	"Perfect Night" (Video)	4:01
4.	"Enhanced Content"

== Charts ==
Chart (2011)	Peak position
UK Indie (Official Charts)	7
UK Singles (The Official Charts Company)	48

== Release history ==
Region	Date	Format	Label
United Kingdom	3 July 2011	Digital download	Conehead Management
United Kingdom	4 July 2011	CD single	Conehead Management
