= Andy Whitmore =

British keyboard player

Andy Whitmore is a British keyboard player and record producer. He works from his own studio, Greystoke Studio, in Ealing, West London. Whitmore has produced 14 UK top-ten hits including "Flava" by Peter Andre and "I've Got a Little Something for You" by MN8. He also produced the 2000 album Love Science 101 by Phoenix J.

== Early career ==
Whitmore started his career as a session musician, playing keyboards with soul band Caleche, touring the UK, Germany and Norway before applying for the job as keyboard player for Spandau Ballet. He later toured and played on Introducing the Hardline According to Terence Trent D'Arby - before working on sessions for artists including Elton John, Fine Young Cannibals, Soul II Soul, Pet Shop Boys, Cathy Dennis, Eternal and many more. He also has an extensive catalogue of music placed in TV and advertising syncs.

== Greystoke Studio ==
Greystoke Studio (opened 1991) is the resident studio of Whitmore. As of 2013 it had 192 kHz digital recording, a large selection of vintage and boutique outboard studio equipment, and the largest working vintage keyboard and synthesiser collection in the UK. The studio has a Minimoog to produce lead and bass sounds, and an EMS Synthi VCS3 analogue synthesiser as used by Pink Floyd. The studio recorded Alexander O'Neal's 2010 album Five Questions: The New Journey produced by Whitmore and Billy Osborne, and engineered by Gareth Matthews.
