= Revelation (Peter Andre album) =

Studio album by Peter Andre
- Released: 14 September 2009
- Recorded: 2008–2009
- Genre: Pop, R&B and pop rock
- Length: 37:01
- Label: Conehead Management Ltd
- Producer: AC Burrell, Kevin McPherson, Jess Jackson

Peter Andre chronology
A Whole New World (2006)	Revelation (2009)	Unconditional: Love Songs (2010)

Singles from Revelation
- 1. "Behind Closed Doors" Released: 9 August 2009; 2. "Unconditional" Released: 9 November 2009

Revelation is the sixth studio album released by singer-songwriter Peter Andre.

== Background ==
Following a further three years away from the music industry, Andre had been quietly writing and recording new material. Andre was offered a recording contract with Conehead Management following the success of his ITV2 fly-on-the-wall documentary, Peter Andre: The Next Chapter. Andre began recording with Conehead in January 2009. On 9 August 2009, "Behind Closed Doors" was revealed as the first single from Andre's upcoming album. The track was co-written by Andre, AC Burrell and Francesca Richard. "Unconditional" was revealed as the second and final single from the album, due for release on 9 November 2009. However, the track had already charted on the UK Singles Chart, following promotion and download sales. Upon the physical release, the track peaked at #50, Andre's second lowest charting single to date. The video for the track premiered on The Box on 16 October 2009. The album itself was released on 19 September 2009, peaking at #3 on the UK Albums Chart, and selling more than 300,000 copies to be certified platinum. The album's track listing was confirmed via Play.com on 14 August 2009.

== Track listing ==
No.	Title	Writer(s)	Producer(s)	Length
1.	"Behind Closed Doors"	Peter Andre; AC Burrell; Francesca Richard	Burrell	3:34
2.	"Distance"	Andre; Burrell; Richard; Jess Jackson	Burrell; Jackson	3:10
3.	"Ready for Us"	Andre; Burrell; Richard; Kevin McPherson; Kevin Demone Kesee	Burell; McPherson	3:11
4.	"The Way You Move (Up In Here)"	Andre; Burrell; Richard; McPherson; Tonyatta Martinez	Burrell	3:11
5.	"Call the Doctor"	Andre; Burrell; McPherson; Raelene Arreguin; Gregory Curtis Jr.	Burrell; McPherson	3:35
6.	"Go Back"	Andre; Burrell; Richard; Jeffrey Anderson; Ryan Pate; David Dodini	Burrell	3:19
7.	"Sliding Doors"	Andre; Burrell; Richard; McPherson	Burrell; McPherson	3:34
8.	"Outta Control"	Burrell; McPherson; Martinez; Christina Nassar	Burrell; McPherson	3:09
9.	"XOXO"	Andre; Burrell; Richard; McPherson	Burrell	3:13
10.	"Replay"	Andre; Burrell; McPherson; Martinez; Michael Ward	Burrell	3:00
11.	"Unconditional"	Andre; Burrell; Richard; McPherson; Charles Syndor	Burrell; McPherson	4:05

== Charts ==
=== Weekly charts ===
Chart (2009)	Peak position
European Albums Hot 100	20
Scottish Albums (OCC)	3
UK Albums (OCC)	3

=== Year-end charts ===
Chart (2009)	Position
UK Albums (OCC)	51

== Certifications ==
Country	Provider	Certification	Sales
United Kingdom	BPI	Platinum	300,000
