= Kinane =

Kinane is a surname. Notable people with the surname include:

- Denis Kinane (born 1957), Scottish immunologist#
- Jeremiah Kinane (1884–1959), Irish prelate
- Kay Kinane (1912–1998), Australian educational broadcaster
- Kyle Kinane (born 1976), American stand-up comedian and actor
- Michael Kinane (born 1959), Irish former flat racing jockey
- Patrick Kinane (1892–1957), Irish politician

== See also ==
- Kinnane, another surname
