= Big Night (album) =

Studio album by Peter Andre
- Released: 26 May 2014
- Recorded: 2013–2014
- Genre: Swing music
- Label: Andre Music

Peter Andre chronology
Angels & Demons (2012)	Big Night (2014)	White Christmas (2014)

Singles from Big Night
- 1. "Kid" Released: 9 February 2014; 2. "Big Night" Released: 13 April 2014

Big Night is the ninth studio album released by British-Australian singer-songwriter Peter Andre. The album was released on 26 May 2014, and was preceded by the lead single, "Kid".

== Background ==
Andre wanted to take another musical direction with this swing music album. Peter co-wrote all 11 songs with singer-songwriter Stevie Appleton. In February 2014, he released the first song off this album, "Kid", which was chosen for the DreamWorks animated movie Mr. Peabody & Sherman. Kid was also used in the Autumn Iceland TV commercials.

== Critical reception ==
Professional ratings
Review scores
Source	Rating
Entertainment-Focus	3/5 stars
RenownedForSound.com	4/5 stars

Carys Jones wrote for Entertainment-Focus that Big Night was "a really great effort from Peter Andre and [was] probably the best album that he [had] ever released" and Janelle Tucknott of RenownedForSound.com claimed that "leaping into the Big Band/Swing/Soul/Blues direction of Big Night [was] a risk which [had] paid off nicely for Peter Andre".

== Track listing ==
All tracks are written by Peter Andre and Stevie Appleton. All tracks produced by Stevie Appleton

Big Night – Standard edition
No.	Title	Length
1.	"Big Night"	2:43
2.	"Kid"	2:58
3.	"Preach"	3:34
4.	"New Orleans"	3:26
5.	"Nothing Matters"	3:15
6.	"Just A Jam"	3:06
7.	"Beware"	3:05
8.	"Would You Mind?"	3:20
9.	"Jessie Ryder"	3:46
10.	"I Do"	3:15
11.	"Birdie Blues"	3:49

Big Night – Deluxe edition
No.	Title	Length
12.	"17"	4:32
13.	"Never Stop Loving You"	3:31
14.	"Sweetheart"	3:21

== Charts ==
Chart (2014)	Peak position
Scottish Albums Chart	93
UK Album Charts	23
UK Independent Chart	4
