= Time (Peter Andre album) =

Studio album by Peter Andre
- Released: 17 November 1997
- Recorded: 1996–1997
- Genre: Pop; R&B
- Length: 51:18
- Label: Mushroom
- Producer: Greg Dawson

Peter Andre chronology
Natural (1996)	Time (1997)	The Very Best of Peter Andre: The Hits Collection (2002)

Singles from Time
- 1. "All About Us" Released: 28 July 1997; 2. "Lonely" Released: 27 October 1997; 3. "All Night, All Right" Released: 12 January 1998

Professional ratings
Review scores
Source	Rating
AllMusic	2.5/5 stars
The Guardian	2/5 stars

Time is the third album released by British-Australian singer-songwriter Peter Andre, released in November 1997. Three singles were released from the album—"All About Us", "Lonely" and "All Night, All Right", with the former two reaching the top 10 and the latter the top 20 on the UK Singles Chart. The album reached number 28 in the UK and New Zealand, and was certified gold by the British Phonographic Industry (BPI).

== Background ==
Following the success of his previous album, Mushroom Records offered Andre an extended record deal, allowing him to record another album on the label. The album was released on 14 November 1997 and became Andre's last album on Mushroom Records, which saw his departure from the music industry for seven years. This was reportedly due to poor sales of the album and its singles. The album featured several collaborations, and spawned three singles: "All About Us", "Lonely" and "All Night, All Right". The album was certified gold, with sales of over 100,000 copies in the UK.

== Track listing ==
Time track listing
No.	Title	Writer(s)	Producer(s)	Length
1.	"All About Us" (featuring Montell Jordan and Lil' Bo Peep)	Jordan; Lil' Bo Peep	Jordan	4:27
2.	"I See You"	Dane DeViller; Sean Hosein; Steve Kipner	Kipner	4:17
3.	"All Night, All Right" (featuring Coolio)	Jordan; Peter Andre; Atris Ivey; Juan Carlos Vercher; Perry Kibble	Jordan; Professor Funk	3:29
4.	"Rest of My Life" (featuring Brian McKnight)	Andre; McKnight	McKnight	4:21
5.	"Letting You Go"	McKnight; Diane Warren	McKnight	4:48
6.	"Nobody Knows"	Andre; Jeff Carruthers	Jay C	4:29
7.	"Tracks of My Tears" (featuring John Forté and Pras)	Marv Tarplin; William "Smokey" Robinson; Warren Moore	Pras; Jerry Duplessis	3:44
8.	"Best of Me" (featuring Izreal)	Andre; Kipner; John Lewis Parker	Parker; Kipner	4:05
9.	"What You Like" (featuring Lord G)	Andre; Carruthers; Darrin Black; Wayne Hector	Jay C	4:18
10.	"Lonely"	Hector; Joe Belmaati; Mich Hansen	Cutfather & Joe	5:04
11.	"Just for You"	Andre	Andre	3:38
12.	"Stay with Me"	Andre; Anthony Johnson; Roger King; Lee Bennett Thompson	King; Stepz	4:38
Total length:				51:18

== Charts ==
Chart performance for Time
Chart (1997)	Peak position
Australian Albums (ARIA Charts)	119
Dutch Albums (Album Top 100)	89
New Zealand Albums (RMNZ)	28
Scottish Albums (OCC)	72
UK Albums (OCC)	28

== Certifications ==
Certifications for Time
Region	Certification	Certified units/sales
United Kingdom (BPI)	Gold	100,000^{^}
^{^} Shipments figures based on certification alone.
