= The Right Way (song) =

Single by Peter Andre

from the album The Long Road Back
- Released: 6 September 2004
- Recorded: 2004
- Length: 3:41
- Label: Atlantic
- Songwriter(s): Peter Andre; David Tyson
- Producer(s): David Tyson

Peter Andre singles chronology
"Insania" (2004)	"The Right Way" (2004)	"A Whole New World" (2006)

"The Right Way" is a song by British-Australian singer Peter Andre, released as the third and final single from his fourth studio album, The Long Road Back. The single was released on 6 September 2004 through East West Records. The single peaked at number 14 on the UK Singles Chart. Andre's then-girlfriend Katie Price appeared in the video, with the pair appearing on British morning television to promote its release.

== Music video ==
The music video was considered to be a showcase of Andre and then-girlfriend Katie Price's relationship. It was shot in black-and-white, and shows "the couple writhing on a bed and beach".

== Track listing ==
UK CD1 (thin case)

1. "The Right Way" (radio edit)
2. "The Right Way" (remix)

UK CD2 (album case)

1. "The Right Way" (radio edit)
2. "The Right Way" (remix)
3. "A Thousand Cries of Loneliness"
4. "The Right Way" (video)

== Charts ==
Chart performance for "The Right Way"
Chart (2004)	Peak position
Scotland (OCC)	16
UK Singles (OCC)	14
