= I Feel You (Peter Andre song) =

1996 single by Peter Andre

Single by Peter Andre

from the album Natural
- B-side: "You Are" (Part 1); "Take Me Back"
- Released: 25 November 1996
- Length: 3:43
- Label: Mushroom
- Songwriters: Peter Andre; Terry "Juice" Jones; Glen Goldsmith
- Producer: Cutfather & Joe

Peter Andre singles chronology
"Flava" (1996)	"I Feel You" (1996)	"Natural" (1997)

"I Feel You" is a song by British singer-songwriter Peter Andre, released in November 1996, by Mushroom Records, as the sixth single from his second studio album, Natural (1996). The track spent one week at number one on the UK Singles Chart in 1996, becoming Andre's second number one in succession, and was the first number-one hit for co-writer Goldsmith, who also co-wrote Andre's single "Mysterious Girl".

== Critical reception ==
A reviewer from Music Week gave the song a score of four out of five, adding that "Andre gets mellow on a strong, sweet ballad. Radio will love it, as will his teen fans. Adult soul fans may come on board, too."

== Track listings ==
- UK CD1
1. "I Feel You" (radio edit)
2. "I Feel You" (The Ruby Centre mix)
3. "You Are" (Part 1)
4. "I Feel You" (Cruisin' mix)
- UK CD2
1. "I Feel You" (radio edit)
2. "I Feel You" (Mark Crypt Lewis mix)
3. "Oh Girl" ("Only One"—original pop mix '93)
4. "I Feel You" (piano version)
- UK cassette single and European CD single
1. "I Feel You" (radio edit)
2. "Take Me Back"

== Charts ==
=== Weekly charts ===
Chart (1996)	Peak position
Belgium (Ultratop 50 Flanders)	47
Belgium (Ultratop 50 Wallonia)	30
Europe (Eurochart Hot 100)	15
Europe (European Hit Radio)	28
Germany (GfK)	71
Ireland (IRMA)	16
Israel (IBA)	6
Netherlands (Dutch Top 40)	17
Netherlands (Single Top 100)	20
New Zealand (Recorded Music NZ)	40
Scotland Singles (OCC)	3
Sweden (Sverigetopplistan)	52
UK Singles (OCC)	1
UK Airplay (Music Week)	10
UK Pop Tip Club Chart (Music Week)	21

=== Year-end charts ===
Chart (1996)	Position
UK Singles (OCC)	69
