= Glen Goldsmith =

British singer (born 1965)

- Born: 17 August 1965 (age 60); High Wycombe, Buckinghamshire, England
- Origin: London, England
- Genres: R&B, pop, soul
- Occupations: Singer, songwriter
- Years active: 1987–present
- Label: RCA

Glen Goldsmith (born 17 August 1965) is a British singer. His own hit songs have included "I Won't Cry", "Dreaming", "Save a Little Bit" and "What You See Is What You Get", which feature on his album What You See Is What You Get. Goldsmith also appeared in the line-up for the Band Aid II single, "Do They Know It's Christmas?", in 1989.

== Career ==
Glen Goldsmith was born in High Wycombe, Buckinghamshire, England. In September 1987, he signed a recording contract with RCA, and released his first single "I Won't Cry". It reached No. 34 in the UK Singles Chart and was also a dance hit single, staying in the dance chart for nineteen weeks and also gaining chart success in Europe. It climbed to No. 18 in Germany. Goldsmith then signed his first publishing deal with Rondor Music. His biggest-selling hit was "Dreaming" (1988), and he promoted it with appearances on several television shows including Top of the Pops and Pebble Mill At One. The record was also played regularly on the local radio station based in Reading, Radio 210. "Dreaming" reached No. 12 in the UK. His album, What You See Is What You Get, was released in July 1988, and peaked at No. 14 in the UK Albums Chart. His other RCA hit singles included "What You See Is What You Get" peaking at No. 33 in the national chart and "Save a Little Bit".

Goldsmith co-wrote and recorded "You Got Me Dancing" with the American producer Jaee Logan for his second album, Don't Turn This Groove Around, which was also released by RCA Records. The single was released in 1989 featuring M.C. Hammer. It was Hammer's first release in the UK. Hammer also appeared in Glen Goldsmith's music video for this song.

Goldsmith's career then moved more into songwriting and production where he published his own work. He worked alongside Ollie Jay and Philip Jacobs during the 1990s. Several songs were released, including "Put Love", "Learn to Live" and "Understanding", written by Goldsmith, Jacobs and Jacobs. Also, "Go with the Flow" which came out on Diverse Records, was written by Goldsmith and the Code.

Goldsmith scored his first top 30 hit as a co-songwriter/producer with Paul Johnson and Phil Edwards. "Call Me by My Name" was recorded by Mica Paris. Goldsmith then worked with Dannii Minogue, Ultimate Kaos, Rozalla, Kinane, with two underground No. 1 dance hits "Heaven" and "Business" and boy group MN8. His biggest hit to date was "Mysterious Girl", as recorded by Peter André On its third release after chart positions No. 53 and No. 2, the track eventually reached No. 1 in the UK Singles Chart, following André's appearance on I'm a Celebrity...Get Me Out of Here!. However, "I Feel You" had given Goldsmith his first UK No. 1 credit as a songwriter when released by André in 1997. Goldsmith went on to have a third hit single as co-writer when "Natural" peaked at No. 6. Another André track, "Turn It Up", was also co-written by Goldsmith.

In 2000, Goldsmith built his own recording studio in Ladbroke Grove, London, and set up Blues & Rhythm, a production company and record label working with various artists such as Soul-unique and his brother lead vocalist KG/Mn8. In 2004, Goldsmith composed "Trippin'" for Milk & Sugar's album, Housemusic.de. In 2008, Goldsmith and Rollover wrote Niki Evans' debut single, "Love Me No More" which failed to reach the top 40 in the UK Singles Chart.

In January 2011, Goldsmith made an appearance on the BBC Television's musical quiz program, Never Mind the Buzzcocks.

Goldsmith set up his own independent record label, Soul on Soul Records, and between 2011 and 2013 released three singles; "Jammin' in the Place", also found on the compilation album, Soul Togetherness 2012 (Expansion Records), "So @ Ease" and "Sunshine". "Jammin' in the Place" made it to the No. 5 position on the Official UK Soul Chart and No.9 in the Sweet Rhythm Chart on Solar Radio. "So @ Ease" made the No. 1 spot on the Official UK Soul Chart. "Sunshine", which was released on 2 July 2013, reached the No. 1 spot on the Official UK Soul Chart on 17 August, Glen's birthday, and retained this position for 2 weeks.

In 2015, Goldsmith topped the Official UK Soul Chart once again with "Don't Delay" and to No. 3 in the Top 100 Songs of 2014. This song also appears on the compilation album Luxury Soul 2015 on Ralph Tee's Expansion Records.

== Discography ==
=== Albums ===
Year	Album	UK
1988	What You See Is What You Get	14

=== Singles ===
Year	Song	UK
1987	"I Won't Cry"	34
1988	"Dreaming"	12
1988	"What You See Is What You Get"	33
1988	"Save a Little Bit"	73
1988	"Give Me the Word"	—
1988	"Undercover"	—
1989	"One Life"	—
1989	"You've Got Me Dancin'" (featuring M.C. Hammer)	84
1989	"Do They Know It's Christmas?" (charity single, as part of Band Aid II)	1
1990	"On the One"	—
1991	"Understanding"	—
1992	"Put Love In"	—
1992	"Can We Lay"	—
1993	"Learn 2 Live"	—
1993	"Go with the Flow"	—
2011	"Jammin' in the Place"	—
2012	"Sunshine"	—
2013	"So @ Ease"	—
2014	"London Skies"	—
2014	"Don't Delay"	—
"—" denotes releases that did not chart.
