= A&E Records =

Record label owned by Warner Music Group

- Parent company: Warner Music Group
- Founded: 19 May 2003
- Founder: Korda Marshall
- Distributor: Warner Records
- Genre: Various
- Country of origin: United Kingdom

A&E Records is a United Kingdom-based record label imprint, owned by Warner Music Group (WMG). It operates under the WEA International group of labels at WMG.

A&E Records was formalised in May 2003, when the NewsCorp Music Group of independent record labels (comprising Mushroom Records UK, Infectious Records, Ultimate Dilemma, Perfecto and 48K) were absorbed into WMG's East West after 20 months of negotiations, with all of its roster transferring over. In November 2004, A&E Records was realigned, and transferred across the company to within the Warner Bros label.

== History ==
A&E Records was formalised on 19 May 2003, with all of Mushroom Records UK and Infectious' artist roster transferring over to the East West imprint, including its new signings The Darkness, Funeral for a Friend and Freeform Five, while Korda Marshall took up the position of managing director with the label. WMG completed its acquisition of Mushroom Records for around $15m (£9.2m) and East West absorbed the functions of Mushroom, which was closed the week prior. East West immediately re-issued its new artists back catalogue albums through A&E Records and Warner Strategic Marketing distribution.

The following year, from 25 June 2004, East West was subject to the rebranding as one of WMG's two frontline UK labels, changing to Atlantic Records (the other label WEA London becoming Warner Bros). On 14 November of that year, Marshall became managing director of Warner Bros. A&E Records was realigned, and transferred across the company to Warner Bros. The Infectious brand name and logo also transferred from Atlantic, along with Ash, Garbage and Muse.

A&E Records has continued to release records by Garbage (until 2007) and Timo Maas and to release Muse records through sub-label Helium 3. The role of Infectious within Warner Bros has been decreased and not including Ash releases, is being used for launching newly signed acts such as The Subways and Larrikin Love. Former parent Festival Mushroom Records was acquired by WMG on 21 October 2005 and its labels and artists absorbed into Warner Music Australia, however none of those artists have been transferred to A&E Records.

=== A&E Records discography ===
Albums

Year	Artist	Release
2003	Paul Oakenfold	Perfecto Presents... Great Wall
2005	Garbage	Bleed Like Me
2005	Timo Maas	Pictures
2007	Garbage	Absolute Garbage
2006	Muse	Starlight

== Mushroom Records UK ==
Mushroom Records UK was set up in London in 1993 by Gary Ashley, as an offshoot of the Australian independent label Mushroom Records, which had been formed in 1972 by Michael Gudinski and Ray Evans in Melbourne. Mushroom Records UK was intended mainly to serve the UK with Australian musical imports. Marshall had previously been RCA's head of A&R, and had left the company to establish his own Infectious Records which he aligned under Mushroom Records UK.

The label's first worldwide signing was US rock group Garbage, who became the flagship for the label, achieving multi-million sales with their first album release. Concerned that they were only known in the United Kingdom for the Neighbours theme (composed by Mushroom Music Publishing), to move away from the association, Mushroom founded the Discordant label for the sole purpose of launching Garbage. Although following their debut single, Garbage were reconciled with the main label, a few Australian acts such as Garageland and Deadstar were licensed to Discordant.

Mushroom had early success with Australian singer Peter Andre, while retaining a diverse roster signing UK acts such as the Wildhearts, and importing Australian acts such as Deni Hines, Christian Fry, Ween, Antenna, Sister2Sister, VAST and Yothu Yindi. Several acts were signed to Infectious Records, including Ash, Symposium, My Vitriol, Cable, Seafood, Elevator Suite and Pop Will Eat Itself, while Mushroom licensed local signing Muse from Taste Media. Sub labels Perfecto had successes with Paul Oakenfold and offshoot label 48K artist Timo Maas; sister label Ultimate Dilemma also had Zero 7, Magnet and Roots Manuva on its books. In 1999, Mushroom Records UK was one of only two labels who wanted to sign singer Kylie Minogue (ultimately she chose to sign to Parlophone).

With these acts charting highly brought Mushroom to the front stage of music in the UK, with an initial £5,000 turnover increasing to £23m over its 10 years, however Marshall began to extricate Mushroom UK from the Mushroom family during 2001, after the parent company had been sold in 1999 to Rupert Murdoch's Newscorp, and merged with his Festival Records to form Festival Mushroom Records. Mushroom Records UK was slowly wound down as negotiations crystallised; its last release was the Garbage single "Shut Your Mouth" in September 2002.

=== Mushroom Records UK discography ===
Albums

Year	Artist	Release
1995	Garbage	Garbage
1996	Peter Andre	Natural
1997	The Wildhearts	Endless, Nameless
1997	Ween	The Mollusk
1997	Archie Roach	Looking for Butter Boy
1997	Peter Andre	Time
1998	Leonardo's Bride	Angel Blood
1998	Garbage	Version 2.0
1998	VAST	Visual Audio Sensory Theater
1998	Antenna	Installation
1999	Ween	Paintin' the Town Brown
1999	Muse	Showbiz
2000	Wilt	Bastinado
2000	Ween	White Pepper
2000	VAST	Music for People
2001	Muse	Origin of Symmetry
2001	Garbage	Beautiful Garbage
2002	Muse	Hullabaloo Soundtrack
2002	Wilt	My Medicine
2003	Muse	Absolution
