= Mysterious Girl =

1995 single by Peter Andre

- One of the artworks used for the 1996 re-release

Single by Peter Andre featuring Bubbler Ranx

from the album Natural and The Long Road Back
- B-side: "Take Me Back" (1995); "Turn It Up" (extended mix) (1996)
- Released: 14 August 1995
- Studio: Roll Over (London, England)
- Genre: Cod reggae; ragga; pop
- Length: 3:39
- Label: Melodian; Mushroom
- Songwriters: Peter Andre; Ollie Jacobs; Phillip Jacobs; Glen Goldsmith; Bubbler Ranx
- Producer: Ollie Jacobs

Peter Andre singles chronology
"Turn It Up" (1995)	"Mysterious Girl" (1995)	"Get Down on It" (1996)
"Kiss the Girl" (1998)	"Mysterious Girl" (2004)	"Insania" (2004)

Music video
- "Mysterious Girl" on YouTube

"Mysterious Girl" is the second overall single and third British single from British singer-songwriter Peter Andre's second studio album, Natural (1996). The song was written by Andre, Ollie Jacobs, Phillip Jacobs, Glen Goldsmith, and Bubbler Ranx, who appears as a featured vocalist. Produced by Ollie Jacobs, "Mysterious Girl" was first released as a single by Melodian Records in Australia on 14 August 1995 and was issued in the United Kingdom the same year, but it was not until a re-release in 1996 that the song became a commercial success there. The accompanying music video was filmed in Thailand.

During its original 1995–1996 release, "Mysterious Girl" peaked at number one in New Zealand, number two in the Netherlands and number three in the United Kingdom. It was also a top-10 hit in Australia, Austria, Belgium, Denmark, Germany, Hungary, Ireland, Israel, Sweden, and Switzerland. On the Eurochart Hot 100, the single reached number 11 in September 1996. In 2004, the song was once again re-released in Ireland and the UK, where it topped the UK Singles Chart following extensive promotion. In 2023, the Official UK Chart revealed that "Mysterious Girl" ranked as number 148 in their ranking of the best-selling singles of all time.

== Critical reception ==
Clem Bastow from The Guardian described "Mysterious Girl" as "a perennial classic from that peculiarly mid-90s period where reggae and dancehall had invaded the pop charts. It holds its own (perhaps due to the guest spot from Caribbean rapper Bubbler Ranx) alongside Maxi Priest's 'That Girl', Shaggy's 'Oh Carolina' and Chaka Demus & Pliers' ebullient cover of 'Twist and Shout'." Daniel Booth from Melody Maker said it is "a slushy, mushy reggae mess that is as horrid as it is awful."

Pan-European magazine Music & Media wrote that "Andre's sunshine reggae single automatically conjures up tropical beaches, palm and coconut trees. As this summer seems to be without end, the chances look good for the Australian." A reviewer from Music Week gave the song three out of five, adding, "After patiently building a UK fanbase, Australian Andre could make the Top 10 with this pleasant reggae track." James Hamilton from the Record Mirror Dance Update described it as a "accomplished but derivative Chaka Demus & Pliers/UB40/Bitty McLean-ish catchy 85.9bpm pop-reggae roller".

== Chart performance ==
The song reached the top of the charts in New Zealand and number eight in Australia, and it peaked at number two on the UK Singles Chart. Following a lengthy campaign on The Chris Moyles Show in 2004, and Andre's appearance on the British reality show I'm a Celebrity, Get Me Out of Here!, the song was re-released as the first single from Andre's fourth studio album, The Long Road Back, peaking at number one in February 2004. In Ireland, "Mysterious Girl" reached number three upon its initial release in 1996, but the 2004 reissue saw the song reach a new peak of number two.

== Music video ==
Filmed in Thailand, the music video for "Mysterious Girl" depicts Ranx and Andre on a beach. There are montages of several women, Andre, and Ranx dancing in a lagoon shirtless and in their jeans. The video was shot on the Phi Phi Islands in Thailand and a Swiss Thai model called Champagne X (her name is Champagne Inthachak), who was a big star at the time, also played as a model in this video. Andre is later seen dancing underneath a waterfall, a more iconic part of the video. Andre is last seen walking along the beach shirtless and later rolls in the sand as the sun sets. Clem Bastow from The Guardian wrote, "The video for the single was as much an advertisement for Andre’s personal trainer and spray-tan artist as it was a music video; the sight of him grooving in searingly blue tropical waters, proudly displaying his new look, was eye-popping (though not necessarily for the reasons he might have hoped)."

== Track listings ==
- Australian CD and cassette single; UK CD single (1995)
1. "Mysterious Girl" (radio edit)
2. "Mysterious Girl" (Malibu edit)
3. "Mysterious Girl" (extended mix)
4. "Mysterious Girl" (instrumental)
- UK 7-inch single (1995)

A. "Mysterious Girl" (radio edit)
B. "Take Me Back"

- UK CD1 (1996)
1. "Mysterious Girl" (radio edit)
2. "Mysterious Girl" (R&B Shankmaster mix)
3. "Mysterious Girl" (Malibu edit)
4. "Turn It Up" (extended mix)
- UK CD2 (1996)
1. "Mysterious Girl" (radio edit)
2. "Mysterious Girl" (Jupiter's Swing mix)
3. "Mysterious Girl" (Dissent & Submerged remix)
4. "Mysterious Girl" (Bag o' Tricks mix)
- UK cassette single (1996)
1. "Mysterious Girl" (radio edit)
2. "Turn It Up" (extended mix)
- Dutch CD single (1996)
1. "Mysterious Girl" (radio edit) – 3:36
2. "Mysterious Girl" (R&B Shankmaster remix) – 5:13
- French CD single (1996)
1. "Mysterious Girl" (radio edit)
2. "Mysterious Girl" (Malibu edit)
3. "Let's Get It On"
- European maxi-CD single (1996)
1. "Mysterious Girl" (radio edit)
2. "Mysterious Girl" (R&B Shankmaster mix)
3. "Mysterious Girl" (Jupiter's Swing mix)
4. "Mysterious Girl" (Bag o' Tricks mix)
- UK CD single (2004)
1. "Mysterious Girl" (radio edit)
2. "Mysterious Girl" (Jupiter soul mix)

== Charts ==
=== Weekly charts ===
Weekly chart performance for "Mysterious Girl"
Chart (1995–1996)	Peak position
Australia (ARIA)	8
Austria (Ö3 Austria Top 40)	3
Belgium (Ultratop 50 Wallonia)	5
Belgium (Ultratop 50 Flanders)	8
Denmark (IFPI)	3
Estonia (Eesti Top 20)	2
Europe (Eurochart Hot 100)	11
Europe (European AC Radio)	9
Europe (European Hit Radio)	7
Finland (Suomen virallinen lista)	20
France (SNEP)	24
Germany (GfK)	7
Hungary (Mahasz)	6
Iceland (Íslenski Listinn Topp 40)	25
Ireland (IRMA)	3
Israel (IFPI)	5
Netherlands (Dutch Top 40)	2
Netherlands (Single Top 100)	3
New Zealand (Recorded Music NZ)	1
Norway (VG-lista)	11
Poland Airplay (Music & Media)	10
Scottish Singles Sales (Official Charts)	2
Sweden (Sverigetopplistan)	6
Switzerland (Schweizer Hitparade)	7
UK Singles (Official Charts)	2
UK Airplay (Music Week)	4
UK Pop Tip Club Chart (Music Week)	4

2004 weekly chart performance for "Mysterious Girl"
Chart (2004)	Peak position
Europe (Eurochart Hot 100)	7
Ireland (IRMA)	2
Scottish Singles Sales (Official Charts)	1
UK Singles (Official Charts)	1
UK Airplay (Music Week)	25

=== Year-end charts ===
1995 year-end chart performance for "Mysterious Girl"
Chart (1995)	Position
Australia (ARIA)	23

1996 year-end chart performance for "Mysterious Girl"
Chart (1996)	Position
Austria (Ö3 Austria Top 40)	22
Belgium (Ultratop 50 Flanders)	64
Belgium (Ultratop 50 Wallonia)	28
Europe (Eurochart Hot 100)	22
Europe (European Hit Radio)	35
France (SNEP)	90
Germany (Media Control)	35
Israel (IBA)	16
Netherlands (Single Top 100)	14
New Zealand (RIANZ)	3
Sweden (Topplistan)	47
Switzerland (Schweizer Hitparade)	33
UK Singles (OCC)	9
UK Airplay (Music Week)	32

2004 year-end chart performance for "Mysterious Girl"
Chart (2004)	Position
UK Singles (OCC)	8

== Certifications ==
Certifications for "Mysterious Girl"
Region	Certification	Certified units/sales
Australia (ARIA)	Platinum	70,000^{^}
Belgium (BRMA)	Gold	25,000^{*}
Germany (BVMI)	Gold	250,000^{^}
Netherlands (NVPI)	Gold	50,000^{^}
New Zealand (RMNZ)	3× Platinum	90,000^{‡}
United Kingdom (BPI)	Platinum	600,000^{^}
^{*} Sales figures based on certification alone.^{^} Shipments figures based on certification alone.^{‡} Sales+streaming figures based on certification alone.
