= Peter Andre =

British singer, songwriter and television personality (born 1973)

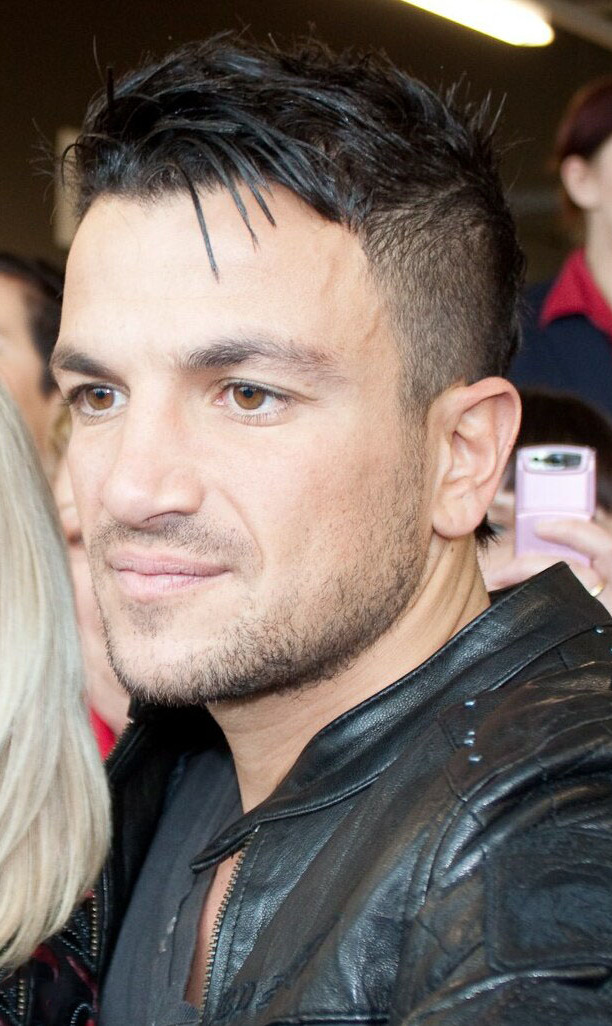
- Andre in 2010
- Born: Peter James Andrea; 27 February 1973 (age 53); Harrow, London, England
- Occupations: Singer; songwriter; media personality
- Years active: 1989–present
- Spouses: Katie Price (m. 2005; div. 2009) Emily MacDonagh (m. 2015)
- Children: 5, including Princess
- Musical career
- Genres: Pop; R&B; cod-reggae
- Instrument: Vocals
- Labels: Melodian; Mushroom; EastWest; Conehead UK; Snapper; Sony BMG; K and P Recordings; Andre Music; Warner Bros.
- Website: peterandre.com

Peter James Andrea (born 27 February 1973), known professionally as Peter Andre, is a British-Australian singer, songwriter and media personality.

Born in England to Cypriot parents and raised in Australia, Andre achieved success in the mid-1990s as a singer, topping the UK Singles Chart with "Flava" and "I Feel You" in 1996. After featuring in the third series of I'm a Celebrity...Get Me Out of Here! in 2004, he found renewed popularity and his 1995 hit "Mysterious Girl" reached No. 1 upon reissue. He has continued his career in music and television, notably competing in the thirteenth series of Strictly Come Dancing (2015) and starring in the Katie & Peter TV franchise (2004–2009) with his then-wife Katie Price, whom he met when both took part in I'm a Celebrity.

Andre has produced twelve studio albums. In the United Kingdom, he has garnered fifteen UK Top 20 hit singles, three of which peaked at the number one position. His thirteenth album, Legacy (a mixture of new songs and reimagined versions of previous hits), is due for release in 2026.

== Early life ==
Andre was born Peter James Andrea on 27 February 1973 in the Harrow area of London, the son of Greek Cypriot parents. He was raised as a Jehovah's Witness but is now lapsed. His brother, Andrew, died of kidney cancer at the age of 54 in December 2012. His other brother, Chris, is also a musician who continues to reside in Cyprus. At the age of six, Andre and his family relocated to Australia, where they lived in Sydney before settling on the Gold Coast when he was nine. At the age of 14, he finished in second place behind Wade Robson in a dancing competition in which the prize was to meet Michael Jackson. In 1989, 16-year-old Andre became a contestant on Australian talent show New Faces. As a result, he was offered a recording contract for $146,000. During this time, he lived in a beach-side apartment in Surfers Paradise and attended Benowa State High School on the Gold Coast.

== Music career ==
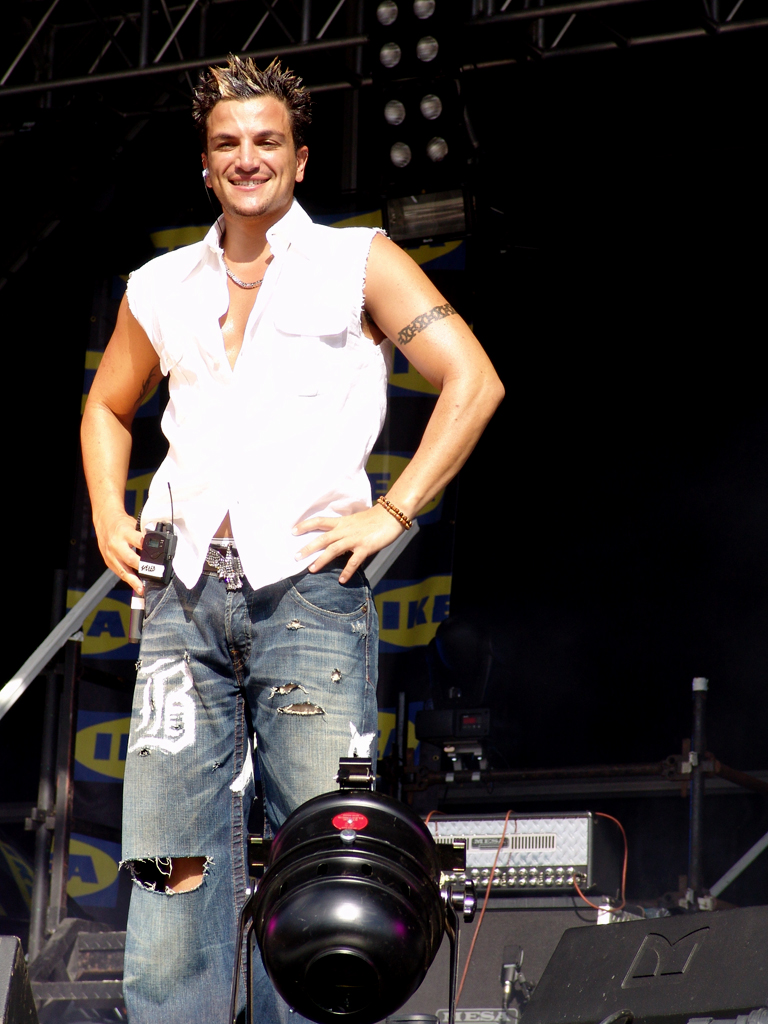
Andre in 2004

Andre was sent to the UK to work with producers Phil Harding and Ian Curnow at PWL Studios, where he recorded his debut single "Drive Me Crazy", and his breakthrough hit, "Gimme Little Sign". "He was brilliant," recalled Curnow of the sessions, while Harding remembered, "he was extremely enthusiastic and quite hard to control — but he was a good singer."

In 1992, Andre released "Drive Me Crazy", which peaked at No. 72 on the Australian singles chart. However, it reached No.1 in the majority of Africa. "Gimme Little Sign" peaked at No. 3 and spent a total of 31 weeks in the charts. In 1993, Andre received an ARIA Award for highest-selling Australian single of the year. His second studio album was released on 30 September 1996, peaking at No. 1 on the UK Albums Chart. The album included the hit single "Mysterious Girl", which peaked at number 2 on the UK Singles Chart in 1996, but reached number 1 on re-release in 2004, following Andre's appearance in I'm a Celebrity...Get Me Out of Here! As a result, Andre returned to the UK in the mid-1990s.

On 23 January 2026, Andre released the single "Rock U Right".

== Television ==
During their marriage, Andre and Katie Price launched the Katie & Peter franchise on ITV2, which documented their life together. The franchise included several fly-on-the-wall reality series which comprised When Jordan Met Peter, Jordan & Peter: Laid Bare and Jordan & Peter: Marriage and Mayhem (2004–05); Katie & Peter: The Next Chapter, Katie & Peter: The Baby Diaries and Katie & Peter: Unleashed (2007); Katie & Peter: Down Under; and Katie & Peter: African Adventures (2008); and Katie & Peter: Stateside in 2009. Their 2009 separation resulted in their individual series being recorded: Peter Andre: The Next Chapter continued on ITV2 until 2011, followed by Peter Andre: Here 2 Help (2011) and Peter Andre: My Life (2011–13).

In July 2010, Andre and Jason Manford were team captains on the ITV series Odd One In. In 2013, Andre was a guest judge on the ITV entertainment series Your Face Sounds Familiar, and later guest-presented five editions of Sunday Scoop on ITV. Since 11 November that year, Andre has presented 60 Minute Makeover, which has been re-branded as Peter Andre's 60 Minute Makeover.

In 2014, Andre released the song "Kid" (for the film Mr. Peabody & Sherman) which was the lead single from his album Big Night. On 8 October that same year, Andre co-hosted the ITVBe opener with Jamelia. In 2014, Andre became the new face to feature in supermarket Iceland's television commercials.

Andre has since starred in the ITV weekly series Give a Pet a Home which works alongside the RSPCA in Birmingham. In August 2015, he was announced as a contestant for the thirteenth series of Strictly Come Dancing which began a month later and in which he was partnered with Janette Manrara. They went out just before the quarter-final, in week 10, and therefore finished in seventh place.

In 2018, Andre voiced Ace the race car in the Thomas & Friends film Big World! Big Adventures!. He reprised the role for the show's 24th season in 2020.

In December 2023, Andre joined the news channel GBNews. He began presenting the weekend show alongside Ellie Costello and is set to co-host the show throughout December.

== Personal life ==
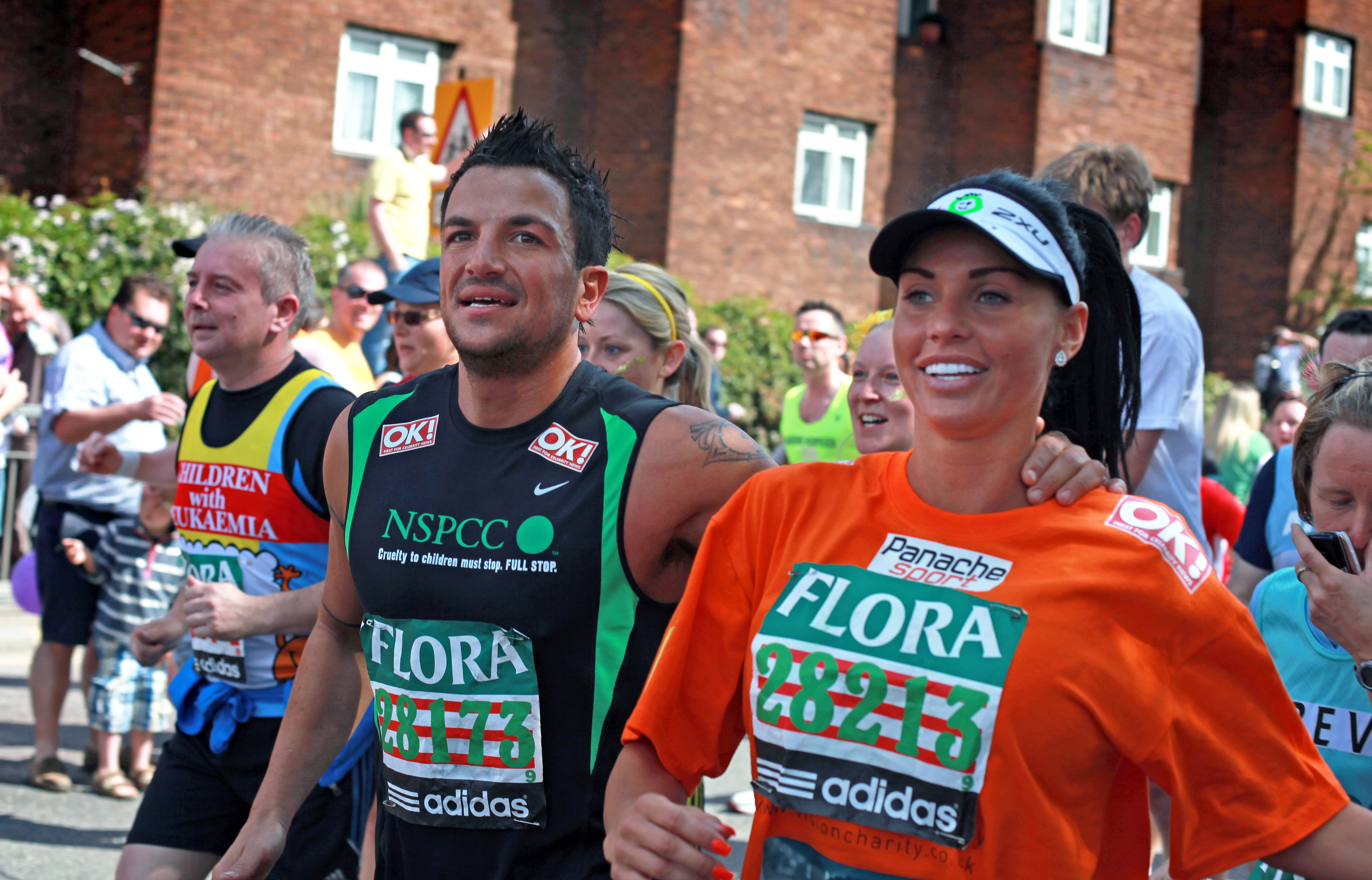
Andre and Katie Price at the London Marathon in 2009

Andre began dating glamour model Katie Price after they met on reality series I'm a Celebrity...Get Me Out of Here! in early 2004. They secretly got engaged that May, but it was not announced publicly until months later. They married on 10 September 2005 at Highclere Castle. They have two children together: Junior Savva Andre and Princess Tiaamii Crystal Andrea. While married to Price, Andre was stepfather to her son from her earlier relationship with footballer Dwight Yorke. They renewed their vows in September 2008, but it was announced in May 2009 that they had separated. They divorced in September of that year.

In July 2012, Andre began a relationship with Emily MacDonagh, a doctor, marrying in 2015 at Mamhead House. The couple have three children, bringing Andre's total to five altogether. They live in Surrey.

Being born to Greek Cypriot parents, Andre enjoys reconnecting with his roots and maintains a home in Kiti.

In the 1990s, Andre had a secret relationship with Spice Girls singer Mel B.

== Discography ==
- Peter Andre (1993)
- Natural (1996)
- Time (1997)
- The Long Road Back (2004)
- A Whole New World (with Katie Price) (2006)
- Revelation (2009)
- Unconditional: Love Songs (2010)
- Accelerate (2010)
- Angels & Demons (2012)
- Big Night (2014)
- White Christmas (2014)
- Come Fly with Me (2015)
- Legacy (2026)

== Filmography ==
=== Film ===
Year	Title	Role	Notes
2012	Keith Lemon: The Film	Peter Andre	
2016	David Brent: Life on the Road	Peter Andre	
2019	The Inheritance	Harry	Short film
2022	On The Other Foot	Justin	
2023	SnapCatch	Donnie	
2024	Members Club	Adonis	
2024	Sun, Rosé & Romance	Carlos	
2025	Finding My Voice	Costas	
2025	Jafaican	Gary Buckle	
TBA	Last Respects	Doctor	Short film; In production

=== Television ===
Year	Title	Role	Notes
2005	Spider-Plant Man	Peter Andre	TV film
2005	Footballers' Wives	Peter Andre	Episode: #4.5
2013	Lemon La Vida Loca	Peter Andre	Episode: #2.3
2015	The Keith Lemon Sketch Show	Peter Andre	Episode: #1.4
2015	Tripped	The Prime Minister	Episode: #1.3
2019	Thomas & Friends	Ace (voice)	Episode: "Big World! Big Adventures!"
2025	The Sunshine Murders	George Constantinos	Episode: 1.1 - 1.8

=== Non-fiction Television ===
- Surprise Surprise (1997) – himself
- I'm a Celebrity...Get Me Out of Here! (2004, 2011) – Contestant; 3rd place
- When Jordan Met Peter (2004) – himself
- Jordan & Peter: Laid Bare (2005) – himself
- Jordan & Peter: Marriage and Mayhem (2005) – himself
- Katie & Peter: The Next Chapter (2007–08) – himself
- Katie & Peter: The Baby Diaries (2007) – himself
- Katie & Peter: Unleashed (2007) – co-presenter
- Katie & Peter: Down Under (2008) – himself
- Katie & Peter: African Adventures (2008) – himself
- Katie & Peter: Stateside (2009) – himself
- Peter Andre: Going It Alone (2009) – himself
- The Big Fat Quiz of the Year (2009) – himself
- Peter Andre: The Next Chapter (2009–11) – himself
- Odd One In (2010–2011) – Team Captain / regular panellist
- Peter Andre: Here 2 Help (2011) – himself
- Peter Andre: My Life (2011–13) – himself
- Peter Andre's Bad Boyfriend Club (2012) – himself
- Celebrity Deal or No Deal (2012) – contestant, won £1,000
- Your Face Sounds Familiar (2013) – guest judge
- Sunday Scoop (2013) – co-presenter
- Peter Andre's 60 Minute Makeover (2013–14, 2018) – presenter
- ITVBe launch show (2014) – co-presenter
- Through the Keyhole (2015) - Homeowner
- Big Star's Little Star (2015) – contestant
- Give a Pet a Home (2015) – celebrity contributor
- Strictly Come Dancing (2015) – contestant; 7th place
- Loose Women (2016) – guest panellist
- Cooking with the Stars (2023) - contestant; runner-up

=== Theatre ===
- Grease (2019) – Teen Angel
- Grease (2019 & 2022-2023) – Vince Fontaine/Teen Angel

== Awards and nominations ==
=== ARIA Music Awards ===
The ARIA Music Awards is an annual awards ceremony that recognises excellence, innovation, and achievement across all genres of Australian music. They commenced in 1987. Andre has won three awards.

ARIA Music Awards recognition for Peter Andre
Year	Nominee / work	Award	Result	Ref.
1994	"Gimme Little Sign"	Highest Selling Single	Won	
1994	Peter Andre	Best Pop Release	Won	
1994	Peter Andre	Breakthrough Artist – Album	Nominated	
1994	Mark Forrester for Peter Andre – "Funky Junky" and "Let's Get it On"	Engineer of the Year	Nominated	
1996	"Mysterious Girl"	Highest Selling Single	Nominated	
1997	Peter Andre	Outstanding Achievement Award	Won	

=== World Music Awards ===
World Music Awards recognition for Peter Andre
Year	Nominee / work	Award	Result	Ref.
1997	Peter Andre	World's Best Selling Australian Artist	Won	
