= Princess Andre =

English media personality (born 2007)

- Born: Princess Tiaamii Crystal Andrea (Note: Many media outlets and online databases erroneously report her birth name as "Princess Tiaamii Crystal Esther Andre". However, official primary records confirm that the middle name "Esther" is incorrect. According to the official General Register Office (GRO) birth registration index for England and Wales, her registered birth name is listed as Princess Tiaamii Crystal Andrea, registered in Westminster during the third quarter of 2007 (Entry Number 500345849).); 29 June 2007 (age 19); Westminster, London, England
- Occupations: Media personality, content creator, model, television presenter, singer
- Years active: 2007–present
- Known for: The Princess Diaries (2025–present)
- Television: Katie & Peter: The Baby Diaries (2007)
- Parents: Katie Price (mother); Peter Andre (father)

Princess Tiaamii Crystal Andrea (born 29 June 2007), known professionally as Princess Andre, is an English media personality. The younger child of Peter Andre and Katie Price, she has been in the public eye since birth and appeared in her family's reality television shows. She has gone on to pursue a career as a social media influencer and a model. Since 2025, she has starred in her own ITV reality documentary series The Princess Diaries.

== Early life ==
Princess Tiaamii Crystal Andrea was born at 8:49 am on 29 June 2007 at the Portland Hospital in Westminster, Greater London, England. Her birth details were formally announced by the private maternity hospital later that day. She is the younger child and only daughter of the singer-songwriter Peter Andre and the glamour model Katie Price. Her middle name was created by combining her grandmothers' names. She is of Greek Cypriot descent through her father, and Italian, Spanish, English and Jewish through her mother. Her parents' divorce was finalised in September 2009, when she was two years old. Following the separation, she was raised between the village of Dial Post in West Sussex and the borough of Epsom and Ewell in Surrey with her elder brother, and multiple half-siblings from her parents' subsequent relationships.

Due to her parents' high-profile careers in the British entertainment industry, Andre was raised in the public eye. Her infancy and childhood were documented across several family-centric reality television series broadcast on ITV2, beginning with Katie & Peter: The Baby Diaries. The four-part fly-on-the-wall documentary series, which premiered on 5 July 2007, chronicled the final weeks of her mother's pregnancy, her delivery at the hospital, and the first six weeks of her life.

Andre was educated at a private school in Surrey, completing her GCSE qualifications in 2023. Following her secondary education, she chose to pursue vocational training in the beauty and cosmetics industry.

From June 2023 to May 2025, Andre was in a publicised relationship, during which she chose to keep her partner's identity private from social media to protect their privacy.

== Career ==
Andre began appearing on television during infancy, featured primarily in reality documentary programmes led by her parents. Her early life was first chronicled in Katie & Peter: The Baby Diaries (2007), a four-part series documenting her birth and first weeks of life. Over the next two years, she appeared across several family spin-offs on ITV2, including Katie & Peter: Unleashed (2007), Katie & Peter: Down Under (2008), Katie & Peter: African Adventures (2008), and Katie & Peter: Stateside (2009).

Following her parents' separation in 2009, Andre appeared in the television documentary Peter Andre: Going It Alone (2009). She subsequently featured across her parents' respective solo reality series, including Peter Andre: The Next Chapter (2009–2011), What Katie Did Next (2009–2010) Peter Andre: My Life (2011–2013), and Katie (2011–2012). In 2015, she made an appearance alongside her father and brother, Junior Andre, on the ITV game show Big Star's Little Star, with Saira Khan, her son Zac, Danny Dyer and his daughter Sunnie.

Between 2016 and 2017, Andre made three guest appearances on the ITV daytime chat show Loose Women, including a Loose Women & Kids Easter broadcast. In September 2019, Andre and her brother co-starred alongside their father in a three-part culinary travelogue miniseries titled Peter's Family Food Adventure, broadcast as a recurring feature on the ITV daytime programme Lorraine. Filmed on location on the island of Brač in Croatia, the segments documented the family participating in Mediterranean cooking. She later returned to recurring reality roles in Quest Red's Katie Price: My Crazy Life (2017–2020) and the Channel 4 home renovation series Katie Price's Mucky Mansion (2022–2023).

In 2023, Andre transitioned into independent commercial work as a fashion and lifestyle influencer. At age sixteen, she executed a commercial social media posting contract with the fast-fashion retailer PrettyLittleThing. Through this partnership, she fronted digital marketing campaigns and participated in a promotional runway showcase at the Ibiza Fashion Festival. She subsequently expanded her endorsement portfolio by securing brand ambassador roles with high-street retailers Superdrug and Boots.

In August 2025, ITVX broadcast Andre's solo debut reality series, The Princess Diaries, documenting her transition into adulthood and her independent career ventures. Following the initial run, the series was renewed for a further multi-part installments in 2026. Aside from her headline series, she participated in the retrospective documentary series Katie Price: Nothing to Hide (2026) on Sky Documentaries, discussing the impacts of growing up under public scrutiny.

In 2026, Andre expanded into daytime television broadcasting through a series of guest appearances on ITV's This Morning. This included appearing with her brother to promote her reality franchise and making her television presenting debut hosting a lifestyle segment focused on summer fashion trends. In July 2026, Andre launched her own cosmetics and beauty line titled "By Princess", which debuted with a jewellery collection collaboration.

== Filmography ==
Year	Title	Notes
2007	Katie & Peter: The Baby Diaries	Main role; 4 episodes
2007	Katie & Peter: Unleashed	Recurring role; 8 episodes
2008	Katie & Peter: Down Under	Recurring role; 4 episodes
2008	Katie & Peter: African Adventures	Recurring role; 2 episodes
2009	Katie & Peter: Stateside	Recurring role; 8 episodes
2009	Peter Andre: Going It Alone	Television documentary
2009–2011	Peter Andre: The Next Chapter	Recurring role; 26 episodes
2009–2010	What Katie Did Next	Recurring role; 22 episodes
2011–2013	Peter Andre: My Life	Recurring role; 40 episodes
2011–2012	Katie	Recurring role; 18 episodes
2015	Big Star's Little Star	1 episode
2016–2017	Loose Women	3 episodes
2017–2020	Katie Price: My Crazy Life	Recurring role; 30 episodes
2019	Lorraine	3 episodes
2022–2023	Katie Price's Mucky Mansion	Recurring role; 7 episodes
2025–present	The Princess Diaries	Main role; 12 episodes
2026	This Morning	3 episodes
2026	Katie Price: Nothing to Hide	Recurring role; 4 episodes
2026	Celebrity Race Across the World	Contestant
