= Katie Price: Nothing to Hide =

British documentary series

- Genre: Reality television Documentary
- Directed by: Paddy Wivell
- Starring: Katie Price
- Original language: English
- No. of episodes: 4

Production
- Executive producers: Aaron Fellows; Emma Whitehead
- Running time: 60 minutes (incl. adverts)
- Production company: Mindhouse

Original release
- Network: Sky Documentaries; Now
- Release: 8 July 2026

Katie Price: Nothing to Hide is a British documentary series starring media personality and model Katie Price. The series documents Price's life and features interviews with Price herself as well as members of her family, friends, colleagues and former partners. The four-part series premiered on 8 July 2026 on Sky Documentaries and streaming service Now.

== Production ==
In April 2026, Sky announced the commissioning of Katie Price: Nothing to Hide. The series documents Price's life and career and features interviews with members of her family, friends including Kerry Katona and Michelle Heaton, colleagues and former partners, including Dane Bowers, Gareth Gates and Alex Reid. Price's ex-husband Peter Andre declined to partake in the documentary "out of love and respect for the couple's children" however stated that the pair maintained an "amicable relationship" and "wished Price the best for her future". The series was teased as "archive-led retrospective [that] goes beyond the headlines, with intimate access to Price and those closest to her - some for decades, some for pivotal moments, and some whose stories have never been told - to candidly examine the consequences of placing herself, and those around her, at the centre of public attention". The series was produced by Mindhouse, Louis Theroux's production company.

On the commissioning of the series, Arron Fellows, co-founder and creative director for Mindhouse said: "Katie’s 30 years in the spotlight have been truly extraordinary. This series doesn’t shy away from - in Katie's own words - 'the good, the bad and the ugly'; and this is an unexpected re-appraisal of a woman many people feel they have already figured out. Paddy and the team have spoken to a range of contributors who have crossed paths with Katie at different junctures of her life - through the ups, the downs and everything in between - and in doing so have crafted a series that is as jaw-dropping and unpredictable as it is tender and surprising. I can't wait for people to see it". Hayley Reynolds, Head of Documentary Commissioning at Sky, said: "Katie Price is one of the defining figures of modern British fame, and her story offers a powerful lens on the culture that shaped it. We're thrilled to be partnering with Paddy Wivell and Mindhouse Productions to continue Sky Documentaries' reputation for raw and unfiltered documentaries about Britain's biggest icons, whose stories also say something about the world we live in." The four-episode series premiered on Sky One on 8 July 2026.

== Episodes ==
No. overall	No. in series	Title	Original release date
1	1	"Becoming Jordan"	8 July 2026
Katie conducts a tour of her garage in which she looks through old photos and magazines, before sitting down to be interviewed. She discusses her early life and her love of horses, as well as detailing how she was a victim of sexual assault as a child. Katie discusses how she wanted to become famous and how she got into modelling. Interviews are conducted with Katie's mum and stepfather Amy and Paul, as well as her brother Dan and one of her early boyfriends Gary Bolingbroke, who share their reactions to Katie's first shoot for Page 3 of The Sun. Katie discusses her breast enhancements and transition into modelling for lads mags. Her ex-partner Dane Bowers is interviewed, and both discuss their relationship and the reasons for it breaking down. Katie is described by those around her as loving attention, and how her drive for success impacted her family and relationships.
2	2	"Jordan v Katie"	8 July 2026
Katie discusses her experience of modelling for Playboy and residing alongside Hugh Hefner at the Playboy Mansion, declining the opportunity of being one of his girlfriends. She is then interviewed about her relationship with Gareth Gates, whom she met whilst he was a contestant on Pop Idol and whilst she was pregnant. Gareth is then interviewed and it is revealed how both parties initially wanted their relationship to remain private, until a hidden camera at a hotel brought their relationship to public attention. Gareth's denial of their relationship resulted in Katie doing a tell-all interview to the tabloids about how she took his virginity. Katie gives birth to her son Harvey in May 2002, and despite father Dwight Yorke's refusal to acknowledge his parentage, was determined to bring him up as a single mother. The tabloids berate Katie and accuse her of being a bad mother and a comment about Gareth whilst presenting an award in 2002 sees her become a public villain, which she uses to her advantage. It concludes with Katie's appearance on I'm a Celebrity...Get Me Out of Here!, which softens her public perception and results in her meeting Peter Andre, whom she begins a relationship with.
3	3	"Jordan's Dead"	8 July 2026
Katie and Peter begin their relationship and the tabloid infatuation with the couple begins. Katie discusses how she signed with the same management company as Peter so they would not be taken in different directions. Under the management of Claire Powell, Katie begins to shun the Jordan image and embarks on various enterprises including books, fragrances, and a range of other merchandise, with her and Peter beginning to star in their reality franchise Katie & Peter. Katie and her family discuss her post-natal depression following the birth of her son Junior, as well as Katie and Peter's wedding which was exclusively covered by OK! magazine. Katie talks about how she began to feel controlled under Claire's management and unable to pursue certain things. Peter's jealousy and controlling behaviour results in their marriage breakdown in May 2009, resulting in a new sense of freedom for Katie, however she is portrayed negatively in the media as opposed to Peter.
4	4	"The Black Sheep"	8 July 2026
Following her divorce from Peter, Katie begins starring in her own solo reality series What Katie Did Next and re-enters the I'm a Celebrity jungle for the second time, with Katie finding the experience difficult due to the memories of Peter, and ultimately quits. She subsequently meets Alex Reid and they marry, with Katie describing it as a rebound, as well as subsequent relationships. Alex is interviewed and tells his side of the story on their tumultuous marriage which ends in divorce. Katie and her family subsequently discuss her third marriage to Kieran Hayler, with his adultery leading to divorce and Katie's mental health spiralling. Her children Junior and Princess discuss the effects of their mother's drug use and behaviour on them. Katie discusses her suicide attempts and car crash which lead to her checking into the Priory Hospital for rehabilitation. Katie and her family discuss how they feel they have more of an understanding of her since her ADHD diagnosis and her mother shares her feelings on how she hopes Katie will one day find a healthy relationship, whilst Junior and Princess hope she finds solace in her own company.

== Reception ==
Lucy Mangan of The Guardian rated the series 3 out of 5 stars and described Price in the series as "candid as ever", but added that the series itself felt "carefully manufactured and defiantly unreflective as any other product supplied by the Price brand." Reviewing the series for The Independent, Adam White described Price as most infuriating, funny, complicated figure in British public life" and said that "the documentary digs into all of this, providing a showcase for Price in all her stripes: how naturally funny she is, how comparatively normal her family is and how easily she glides between healthy emotional clarity and violent self-destruction.
