= This Christmas (Katie Price song) =

2025 song by Katie Price

Single by Katie Price featuring Mhina
- Released: 12 December 2025
- Recorded: 2025
- Length: 2:45
- Label: Turn This Up
- Songwriters: Katie Price; Chris Mhina; Shaye
- Producer: Shaye

Katie Price singles chronology
"Best of Me" (2025)	"This Christmas" (2025)

"This Christmas" is a song by English media personality and former glamour model Katie Price. Produced by Shaye, and released via his record label Turn This Up Music, it features vocals from Mhina and was released on 12 December 2025. Proceeds from the single were donated to charities Woman's Trust and Children in Need, respectively

== Background and release ==
In August 2025, following a campaign to support Price, resulting in a resurgence of interest in her music. Her songs "I Got U", released in 2017, and "Hurricane", released in 2019, reached number 2 and number 20 on the UK Singles Sales Chart respectively, with Price announcing her intention to release further music. She subsequently went on to release her comeback single "Best of Me" in October 2025, which was produced by Shaye, who also produced "This Christmas". In December 2025, Price posted a teaser of the song on her Instagram account. The same week, she posted a behind the scenes photo from the music video on the same platform, stating "Something exciting [was] coming soon. The song was released on 12 December 2025 and features vocals from Mhina. An accompanying music video was released three days later, which featured both Price and Mhina, as well as Price's son, Harvey. Proceeds from the single were donated to charities Woman's Trust and Children in Need, respectively.

== Personnel ==
- Katie Price – vocals, songwriting
- Chris Mhina – vocals, songwriting
- Shaye – production, songwriting

== Release history ==
Region	Date	Format	Label	Ref.
Various	12 December 2025	Digital download, streaming	Turn This Up	
