= To Die For (Luke Galliana song) =

Single by Luke Galliana
- Released: 30 April 2001
- Recorded: PWL Studios
- Length: 3:03
- Label: EBUL/Jive
- Songwriter(s): Deni Lew, Nicky Graham, Stephen Lipson, Wayne Hector
- Producer(s): Topham, Twigg & Waterman

"To Die For" is a song released by Luke Galliana, who entered it into the United Kingdom selection for the Eurovision Song Contest 2001. The song made the final eight, but failed to gain the votes of the BBC Radio 2 audience on Friday morning. The single was released on 30 April 2001, and entered the UK chart at number 42.

The single was produced by Pete Waterman. It was described by Peter Robinson in the NME as "a single which appears to have no chorus, virtually no tune and not a hint of sex to be found anywhere".

In 2006, "To Die For" was covered by Katie Price and Peter Andre on their album A Whole New World.

== Track listing ==
Track 4 is an enhanced video included on the CD.

No.	Title	Writers	Length
1.	"To Die For"	Deni Lew, Nicky Graham, Stephen Lipson, Wayne Hector	3:03
2.	"There's a Place in My Heart"	Karl Twigg, Mark Topham	3:39
3.	"To Die For" (extended version)	Deni Lew, Nicky Graham, Stephen Lipson, Wayne Hector	3:34
4.	"To Die For"	Deni Lew, Nicky Graham, Stephen Lipson, Wayne Hector	2:59

== Personnel ==
- Engineering – Mark "Ridders" Risdale
- Mixing – Matt Howe
- Producers – Topham, Twigg & Waterman
