= Best of Me (Katie Price song) =

Single by Katie Price featuring Lady Ice
- Released: 3 October 2025
- Recorded: 2025
- Length: 3:16
- Label: Turn This Up
- Songwriters: Katie Price; Lady Ice; Shaye
- Producer: Shaye

Katie Price singles chronology
"Hurricane" (2019)	"Best of Me" (2025)	"This Christmas" (2025)

"Best of Me" is a song by English media personality and former glamour model Katie Price. Produced by Shaye, and released via his record label Turn This Up Music, it is a dance-pop song featuring vocals from rapper Lady Ice and was released on 3 October 2025.

== Background and release ==
In August 2025, following a campaign to support Price and a resurgence of interest in her music, her songs "I Got U", released in 2017, and "Hurricane", released in 2019, reached number 2 and number 20 on the UK Singles Sales Chart respectively. The former also reached number 1 on the UK iTunes Chart to which Price said she "Literally couldn't believe it" [...] and said "Thank you to everyone my dreams have come true." In September 2025, Price posted a photo of herself in a music studio with the caption "Back in the studio, just recorded my new single". The following week, while being interviewed at the 30th National Television Awards, Price's children Junior and Princess Andre confirmed that she would be releasing new music, and the following day, Price shared a snippet of the song in a video alongside Shaye, who wrote and produced the track, as well as other production members, and Lady Ice, who features on the song. The song was released on 3 October 2025, alongside an accompanying music video.

== Personnel ==
- Katie Price – vocals, songwriter
- Lady Ice – vocals, songwriter
- Shaye – producer, songwriter

== Charts ==
Chart performance for "Best of Me"
Chart (2025)	Peak position
UK Singles Sales (OCC)	21

== Release history ==
Region	Date	Format	Label	Ref.
Various	3 October 2025	Digital download, streaming	Turn This Up	
