= This Christmas =

This Christmas may refer to:

== Music ==
- This Christmas (98 Degrees album), 1999
- This Christmas (John Travolta and Olivia Newton-John album), 2012
- This Christmas (Jessie James Decker EP), 2015
- This Christmas (Patti LaBelle album), 1990
- "This Christmas" (Donny Hathaway song), 1970
- "This Christmas" (Katie Price song), 2025
- "This Christmas" (Taeyeon song), 2017
- "This Christmas" (TobyMac song), 2002
- "This Christmas", 2009 song and album by Michael McDonald
- "This Christmas", 2010 song by JYP Nation

== Other uses ==
- This Christmas (2007 film), an American Christmas comedy film
- This Christmas, 2005 book by Jane Green

== See also ==
- This Christmas, Aretha, a 2008 Christmas album by Aretha Franklin
- This Christmas: Winter Is Coming, 2017 EP by Taeyeon
- This Is Christmas (disambiguation)
