= Can Associates TV =

British independent television production company

Can TV logo

Can Associates TV is a British independent television production company which produced the Katie & Peter reality shows.

== Peter Andre ==
After his divorce from Kate Price, Peter Andre continued working with Can Associates TV with Going It Alone and The Next Chapter and also relaunched his music career; he also signed a new contract with ITV2

== Kerry Katona ==
In November 2010 Kerry Katona signed a contract with Can Associates and ITV2 to make a programme that is similar to that of Peter Andre. In June 2011, Katona and Can Associates parted company, apparently because of her wild parties in Spain. As a result of these differences, the third series of Katona's fly-on-the-wall show The Next Chapter, which was due to be broadcast in late 2011, was in jeopardy; in September 2011 ITV axed the show.

== Filmography ==
Title	Year
Katie & Peter	2007–2009
Peter Andre: Going It Alone	17 August 2009
Peter Andre: The Next Chapter	2009–present
Nicola McLean: Studs and Stilettos	13–17 December 2009
Kerry Katona: Coming Clean	5 December 2010
Kerry Katona: The Next Chapter	2010–2011
