= The Princess Diaries (TV series) =

British reality documentary series

- Genre: Reality; Documentary
- Starring: Princess Andre
- Original language: English
- No. of series: 3
- No. of episodes: 12

Production
- Executive producer: Laura Woolf
- Running time: 60 minutes (incl. adverts)
- Production company: Optomen

Original release
- Network: ITV2; ITVX
- Release: 10 August 2025 – present

The Princess Diaries is a British reality documentary series starring media personality Princess Andre. The series documents Andre as she navigates her career and family life. It began airing on 10 August 2025 on ITV2. Since its inception, the series has received mixed reviews. Andre's personality has been praised, while the format of the series has been criticised for its handling of serious issues and topics, including her childhood trauma and family issues.

== Production ==
In 2025, ITV commissioned The Princess Diaries, produced by Optomen, which is part of All3Media. The series follows Princess Andre as she transitions into adulthood, and begins building her career as an influencer and model, as well as documenting her family life. The series features her parents Peter Andre and Katie Price, as well as her siblings.

The first series began airing in August 2025, and subsequently became ITV2's biggest launch outside of Love Island and Big Brother. In October 2025, ITV renewed the series for two further four-part series in 2026. Amanda Stvri, Commissioning Editor for Reality and Entertainment at ITV, said: "Princess dominated side bars and social media throughout the Summer and as our streams show, the ITV audience whole heartedly embraced her. Now reality fans can look forward to not one but two more chapters in Princess' story as we line up two new series for next year, as Princess embraces independence and adulthood." Tina Flintoff, Creative Director for Optomen, added: "Princess is such a pleasure to work with. We're delighted the series did so well and that we've been given the opportunity to continue bringing her story to life."

== Episodes ==
=== Series overview ===
| Series | Episodes | Originally released | |
| Series | Episodes | First released | Last released |
|---|---|---|---|
| 1 | 4 | 10 August 2025 | 13 August 2025 |
| 2 | 4 | 8 March 2026 | 11 March 2026 |
| 3 | 4 | 28 July 2026 | 31 July 2026 |

=== Series 1 (2025) ===
| No. overall | No. in series | Title | Original release date |
|---|---|---|---|
| 1 | 1 | "Episode 1" | 10 August 2025 |
| 2 | 2 | "Episode 2" | 11 August 2025 |
| 3 | 3 | "Episode 3" | 12 August 2025 |
| 4 | 4 | "Episode 4" | 13 August 2025 |

=== Series 2 (2026) ===
| No. overall | No. in series | Title | Original release date |
|---|---|---|---|
| 5 | 1 | "Episode 1" | 8 March 2026 |
| 6 | 2 | "Episode 2" | 9 March 2026 |
| 7 | 3 | "Episode 3" | 10 March 2026 |
| 8 | 4 | "Episode 4" | 11 March 2026 |

=== Series 3 (2026) ===
| No. overall | No. in series | Title | Original release date |
|---|---|---|---|
| 9 | 1 | "Episode 1" | 28 July 2026 |
| 10 | 2 | "Episode 2" | 29 July 2026 |
| 11 | 3 | "Episode 3" | 30 July 2026 |
| 12 | 4 | "Episode 4" | 31 July 2026 |

== Reception ==
The Princess Diaries has received mixed reviews. Reviewers praised Andre's personality and maturity while criticising the format's handling of deeper family issues. Katie Rosseinsky of The Independent described Andre as "very sweet and improbably well-adjusted, funny and self-possessed", but argued that her "childhood trauma deserves a better format than this tacky reality show". Stuart Heritage in The Guardian noted "an undercurrent of impenetrable sadness" and found the day-to-day life of an influencer "relentlessly boring". Positive coverage highlighted Andre's honesty, drive to build an independent career, and strong relationship with her brother Junior.
