= This Is Christmas =

This Is Christmas may refer to:

- "So this is Christmas…", the opening line of "Happy Xmas (War Is Over)", a 1971 song by John & Yoko/Plastic Ono Band
- This Is Christmas (Luther Vandross album), 1995
- This Is Christmas (Katherine Jenkins album), 2012
- This Is Christmas (Anthony Callea album), 2013
- A song from It's Christmas All Over by Goo Goo Dolls, 2020
- This Is Christmas (film), British film directed by Chris Foggin

== See also ==
- This Christmas (disambiguation)
