= I Got U (Katie Price song) =

2017 song by Katie Price

Single by Katie Price
- Released: 30 June 2017
- Recorded: 2017
- Genre: Dance-pop
- Length: 3:52
- Songwriter: Craig Colton

Katie Price singles chronology
| "Free to Love Again" (2010) | "I Got U" (2017) | "Hurricane" (2019) |

"I Got U" is a song by English media personality and former glamour model Katie Price. A dance-pop song, it was released on 30 June 2017 and was written by Craig Colton, a former contestant on The X Factor in 2011. The song marked Price's attempt to relaunch her music career following earlier musical endeavors. The track received mixed reviews from fans and critics, with some praising its summery dance vibe while others criticized Price's vocal performance. In 2025, "I Got U" experienced a resurgence, reaching number 1 on the UK iTunes Chart and number 2 on the UK Singles Downloads Chart.

== Background and development ==
Following her earlier music ventures, including a bid to represent the United Kingdom at the 2005 Eurovision Song Contest with the song "Not Just Anybody", the release of the duet album A Whole New World with then-husband Peter Andre and her 2010 solo single "Free to Love Again", Price sought to relaunch her pop career with "I Got U". The song was written by Craig Colton, a who was contestant on the eighth series of The X Factor. Price stated that despite her manager's advice against pursuing music, she was determined to release the single, expressing confidence that it would not be a "flop." She described her motivation as a personal passion for music rather than financial gain, saying, "I've always wanted to be a popstar or a model. I'm doing it because I can do it and I will do it, it's not about money."

== Release and promotion ==
"I Got U" was released on 30 June 2017 as a digital download. Price promoted the single through various live performances, including an appearance on Loose Women, where she performed the song live to counter claims of using auto-tune. She also performed at G-A-Y in London in July 2017, wearing a carnival-inspired outfit with a glittering leotard and feather accessories.

Additional promotional efforts included a performance on Big Brother's Bit on the Side, where Price reunited with her ex-boyfriend Dane Bowers and performed "I Got U". Price has since gone on to perform the song at numerous LGBTQ+ pride events.

== Reception ==
Upon its release, "I Got U" received mixed reactions from fans and critics. Some fans praised the song as a catchy summer dance track, with one commenting, "I'm sorry but this is actually quite good for a summer club song," and another describing it as "a little summer tune I'd listen to by the pool with a cocktail in hand." However, others were critical, with some viewers of her Loose Women performance describing it as "cringey" or "embarrassing," and one fan stating, "Even autotune failed there." Critics noted the heavy use of auto-tune, with one social media user sarcastically remarking, "Amazing what the studio can do for your voice."

In August 2025, following a TikTok campaign in support of Price, "I Got U" saw a resurgence in popularity, climbing to number one on the UK iTunes Chart. Price expressed her gratitude on social media, stating, "Thank you to everyone my dreams have come true. Well, for once I'm speechless!".

== Chart performance ==
Upon its initial release in 2017, "I Got U" peaked at number five on the UK iTunes Dance Chart. In August 2025, the song experienced a significant resurgence, reaching number one on the UK iTunes Chart.

== Track listing ==
Digital download
| No. | Title | Length |
|---|---|---|
| 1. | "I Got U" | 3:52 |

== Charts ==
"I Got U" chart performance
| Chart (2025) | Peak position |
|---|---|
| UK Singles Sales (OCC) | 2 |

== Release history ==
| Region | Date | Format | Label | Ref. |
|---|---|---|---|---|
| Various | June 30, 2017 | Digital download | —N/a | |
