= Signed by Katie Price =

- Also known as: Discovered by Katie Price
- Genre: Reality television
- Created by: Katie Price
- Presented by: Katie Price
- Judges: Katie Price; Glen Middleham; Bayo Furlong
- Country of origin: United Kingdom
- Original language: English
- No. of seasons: 1
- No. of episodes: 8

Production
- Running time: 60 mins (inc. adverts)
- Production company: Pricey Media Ltd

Original release
- Network: Sky Living
- Release: 10 October – 28 November 2011

Related
- Katie

Signed by Katie Price (formerly Discovered by Katie Price) is a British reality television show which was broadcast on Sky Living in 2011. It features 13 contestants competing for a contract with Blacksheep Management, a management company owned by model Katie Price.

The winner was promised a mentorship with Price, as well as yearly calendars, red carpet events, overseas jobs, magazine deals, a Range Rover for a year, and a spread in a fashion magazine which includes appearing on the front cover, and a holiday in Maldives. Other benefits included an apartment.

Signed by Katie Price was one of the first shows to be produced by Price's own production company Pricey Media.

== Auditions ==
Auditions were held in four of the United Kingdom's biggest cities, including:

1. Leeds;
2. Bristol;
3. London;
4. Birmingham

Over 10,000 people auditioned for Signed By Katie Price across all four locations. Contestants auditioned in front of three judges: Glen Middleham, Bayo Furlong, and Katie Price.

== Contestants ==
Name	Age	Hometown	Outcome	Place
Rehea Watson	21	Haslemere, Guildford	Episode 3	13-12
Nathan DiCarlo	19	Stockton-On-Tees	Episode 3	13-12
Tayla-Jay Harris	21	Dudley, West Midlands	Episode 4	11
Ben Sissman	22	Leeds	Episode 4	10 (quit)
Melissa Reeves	19	Liverpool	Episode 5	9-8
Susie Whiteley	21	Bridgend, South Wales	Episode 5	9-8
Billy Harding	26	Surrey	Episode 6	7-6
Jemma Henley	23	London	Episode 6	7-6
Jamie Roche	26	Wychbold, Worcester	Episode 7	5-4
Sarah Meade	21	Smallwood, Redditch	Episode 7	5-4
Kirsten Van Terheyden	19	West Yorkshire	Episode 8	3
Rylan Clark-Neal	22	Essex	Episode 8	2
Amy Willerton	19	Bristol	Episode 8	1

== Episodes ==
=== Episode 1 ===
Contestants audition for the three judges at their local shopping centers in front of the public. Each contestant had to walk down a catwalk before having their photo taken by a photographer. This image was shown to the judges while they interviewed the contestant. If the judges want to see more of the contestant, they are instructed to change into swimwear or lingerie before walking the catwalk again. Each contestant then received feedback. Only 50 contestants were chosen from the live auditions to attend Bootcamp.

=== Episode 2 ===
The 50 selected contestants from Episode 1 (Auditions) headed to Bootcamp. They had 48 hours to display their marketability using their personality, creativity and flair. The first task set by Katie Price during the Bootcamp workshop was for the female contestants to remove all makeup and strip down to their underwear. The male contestants had to strip down to black and pink underwear. The judges then chose their top 12 contestants. These were Rehea Watson, Nathan DiCarlo, Tayla-Jay Harris, Melissa Reeves, Susie Whiteley, Billy Harding, Jemma Henley, Jamie Roche, Sarah Meade, Kirsten Van Terheyden, Rylan Clark-Neal and Amy Willerton.

=== Episode 3 ===
The twelve contestants moved into a luxury house for their first assignment, to participate in an equestrian-themed photo shoot on Katie Price's ranch. The second assignment in the episode was for each contestant to be interviewed for the UK newspaper The Sun. The goal was to learn the art of "No Comment" when dealing with the press.

Nathan DiCarlo and Rehea Watson were eliminated from the competition, leaving 10 contestants.

During the eliminations, a wildcard entry (Ben Sissman) joined the competition, so increasing to 13 contestants.

=== Episode 4 ===
The final eleven contestants' next assignment was to create the ultimate campaign poster, built around a product with a brief provided by the judges. Tayla-Jay Harris was eliminated after failing to impress the judges, and the wildcard entry (Ben Sissman) left the competition.

=== Episode 5 ===
The remaining nine contestants were given the next assignment by Katie Price, which was to generate self-publicity through an online video campaign about themselves. To reward the contestants for their efforts, Katie invited them to a party where she watched them as a hidden challenge. Melissa Reeves and Susie Whitely were eliminated from the competition for failing to impress the judges.

=== Episode 6 ===
The final seven contestants were given a complete makeover. Afterwards, each had a photo shoot and had to sell their new image with confidence. Billy Harding and Jemma Henley were eliminated, leaving the remaining contestants to form the final five.

=== Episode 7 ===
The final five contestants were given their next assignment, which was being secretly judged by a focus group. Each contestant was scored after looking at their recent photoshoots and watching their video. This counted towards their chances of elimination. The next assignment was to sell themselves to the directors of Blacksheep Management, Danny Infield (brother and financial manager of Katie Price) and Andrew Antonio (business manager). During these challenges contestants were judged on their ability to promote themselves. Jamie Roche and Sarah Meade were eliminated, leaving Kirsten Van Terheyden, Rylan Clarke and Amy Willerton as the final three.

=== Episode 8 ===
During Episode 8, the final three contestants had to shoot a campaign. The winner would receive their own perfume, and the campaign photos would be used to promote with a press launch. The second assignment was for further photography to be used at the end of the series. Katie eliminated Kirsten Van Terheyden in a final interview, leaving Rylan Clark and Amy Willerton as the final two. During a press call, each contestant explained their perfumes and photo shoots and also participated in a Q&A session with the public and press.

During this episode, Amy Willerton was announced as the winner with Rylan Clark-Neal as the runner-up.

== Controversy ==
Following Willerton's win, Katie Price and her management failed to provide a number of the promised prizes. She was asked to pay £10,000 to insure her "free" Range Rover for a year, a holiday in The Maldives turned into Marbella and a cover shoot with OK! magazine disappeared. Willerton eventually refused to sign the modelling contract with Blacksheep Management, after losing confidence in their ability to deliver.

== Finalists ==
	Top 13				Final Five	Final Three	Final Two	Winner
Episode #:	2	3	4	5	6	7	8	8
Contestant	Vote							
Rehea Watson	Safe	Eliminated						
Nathan DiCarlo	Safe	Eliminated						
Tayla-Jay Harris	Safe	Safe	Eliminated					
Ben Sissman		Wildcard	Left					
Melissa Reeves	Safe	Safe	Safe	Eliminated				
Susie Whiteley	Safe	Safe	Safe	Eliminated				
Billy Harding	Safe	Safe	Safe	Safe	Eliminated			
Jemma Henley	Safe	Safe	Safe	Safe	Eliminated			
Jamie Roche	Safe	Safe	Safe	Safe	Safe	Eliminated		
Sarah Meade	Safe	Safe	Safe	Safe	Safe	Eliminated		
Kirsten Van Terheyden	Safe	Safe	Safe	Safe	Safe	Safe	Eliminated	
Rylan Clark-Neal	Safe	Safe	Safe	Safe	Safe	Safe	Safe	Runner-Up
Amy Willerton	Safe	Safe	Safe	Safe	Safe	Safe	Safe	Winner

== Reaction ==
Readers of UKGameshows.com named it, on a two-way tie, the seventh-worst new game show of 2011 in their "Hall of shame" poll.
