= Portsmouth Pride =

Annual LGBTQ event in Portsmouth, England

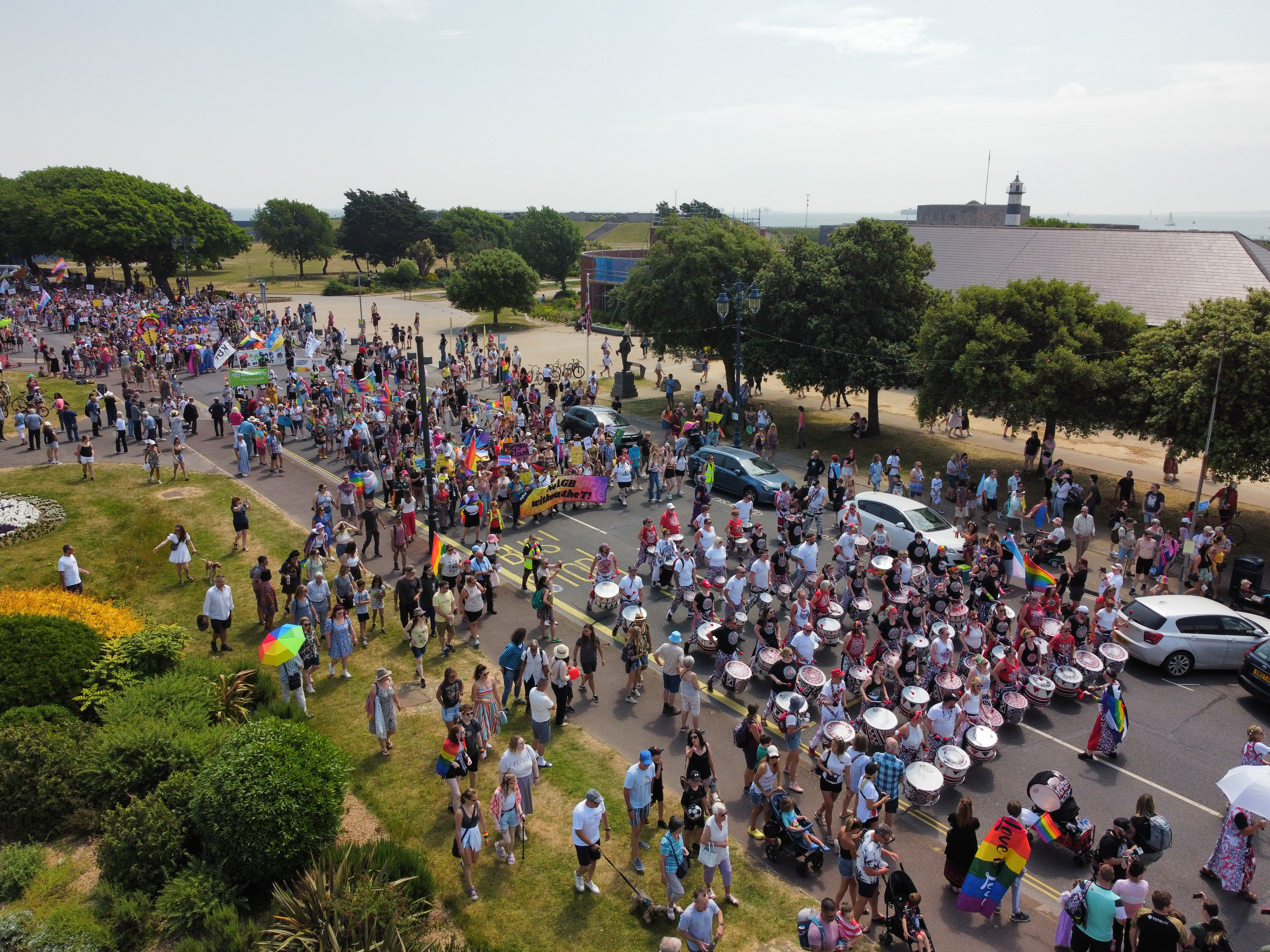
- Portsmouth Pride parade in Southsea, 2023
- Frequency: Annually
- Locations: Portsmouth, England
- Founded
- Next event: 6 June 2026
- Website: portsmouthpride.org.uk

Portsmouth Pride is an annual LGBTQ pride event in the city of Portsmouth, England, led by the Portsmouth Pride Trust, a registered charity.

== History ==
In December 2014, a 2015 Portsmouth Pride event was announced; Portsmouth LGBT Pride chair David Lee-Bastable stated that he believed the last event had taken place in 2003. The event was planned to start and end at Victoria Park and stalls and performances in Guildhall Square.

Portsmouth Pride became a registered charity in August 2018. 14,000 people attended Portsmouth Pride in June 2022. In July that year, the u-turn of MP Penny Mordaunt on transgender rights for her bid in the Conservative Party leadership election led to Portsmouth Pride being contacted by several distressed people from the LGBTQ community. MP Stephen Morgan joined the march in 2023.

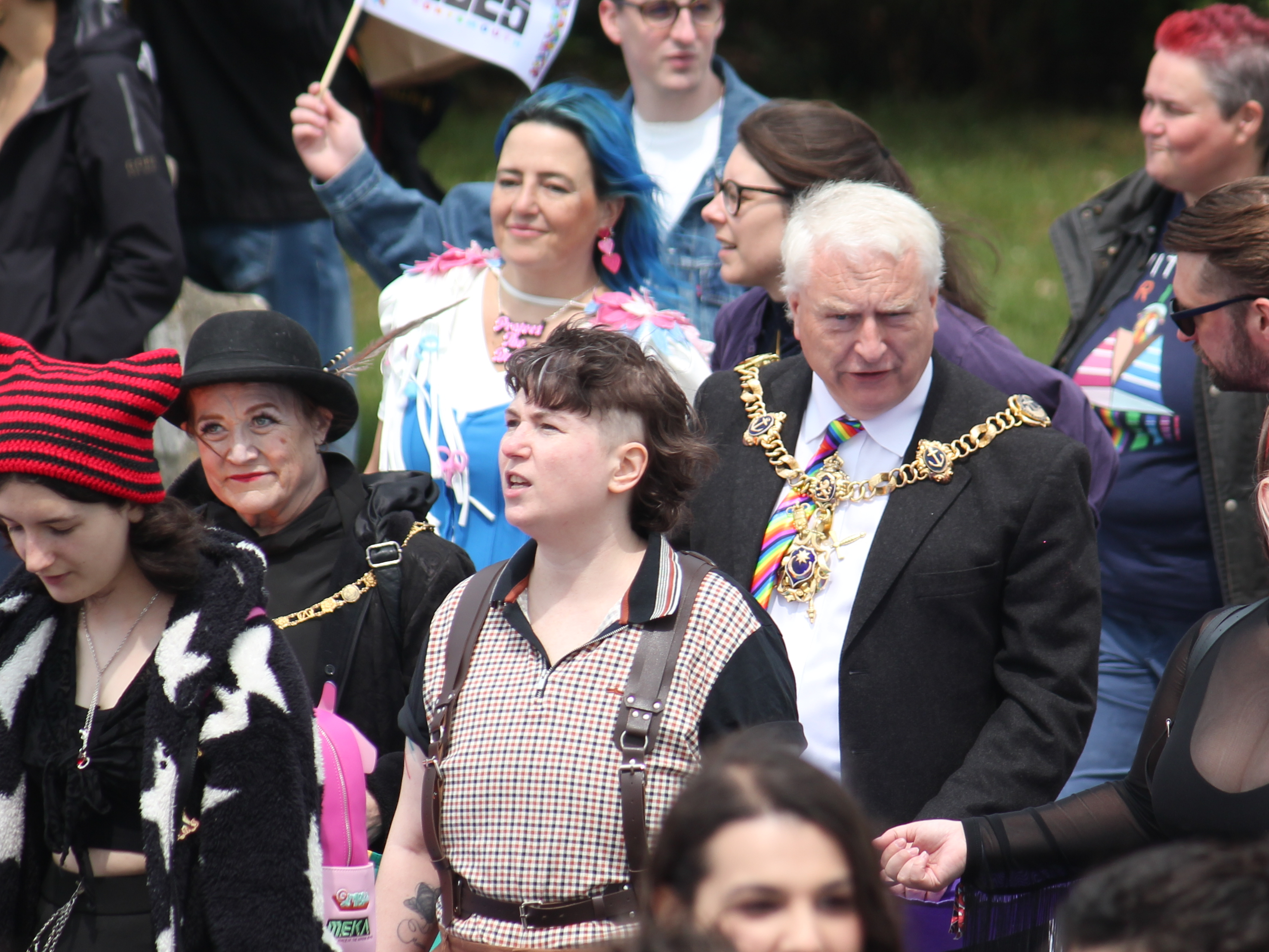
Mayor Gerald Vernon-Jackson (right) at Portsmouth Pride 2025

In 2025, Portsmouth was selected "with a strong majority" from over 260 community-run Pride organisations for UK Pride by the UK Pride Organisers Network. For this event Portsmouth Historic Quarter commissioned the decoration of Foxtrot 8, a Falklands War landing craft, with a rainbow vinyl wrap to celebrate the progress of LGBTQ community in the armed forces. Acts at the event included Nadine Coyle who headlined, as well as Katie Price, Sabrina Washington and drag queens Kyran Thrax, Victoria Scone, and River Medway.
