= Peter Andre: My Life =

British reality show (2009-2013)

- Also known as: The Next Chapter (2009–11); Here 2 Help (2011)
- Directed by: Jamie Zwaig; Charlie Carpenter
- Starring: Peter Andre; Emily MacDonagh; Junior Andre; Princess Andre; Michael Andre; Chris Andre
- Narrated by: Lola Buckley
- Composer: Hendricks Audio
- Country of origin: United Kingdom
- Original language: English
- No. of series: 10
- No. of episodes: 77

Production
- Executive producer: Neville Hendricks
- Producers: Jamie Zwaig; Charlie Carpenter
- Editors: George Taylor; Tracey Jury; James Harrod
- Running time: 60 minutes (Series); 90 minutes (Pilot)
- Production companies: Can Associates TV; Shiver Productions

Original release
- Network: ITV2
- Release: 17 August 2009 – 23 December 2013

Related
- Katie & Peter; Katie

Peter Andre: My Life is a British television fly on the wall reality show broadcast on ITV2, that focuses on British-Australian singer and television personality Peter Andre, as cameras follow him throughout his everyday life. Originally born from a pilot entitled Peter Andre: Going it Alone, which focused on his divorce from model Katie Price, ten series of the programme were broadcast.

The first four series were known as The Next Chapter, the final five as My Life, and a single series as Here 2 Help, which saw Peter take time out from his private life to help those in need. Including the pilot, the first episode was broadcast on ITV2 on 17 August 2009. The final episode broadcast on 23 December 2013. Aside from the final episode of Here 2 Help, every single episode of the series ranked in the top 10 programmes broadcast on ITV2 that week.

== Episodes ==
=== Pilot ===
- This one-off special was 90-minutes long and earned one of ITV2's highest ever ratings, earning a peak of 1.9 million viewers. Following the success of the episode, Andre stated that a full series had been commissioned and was slated to air in November 2009.

No.	Title	Original release date	Viewers (millions)
1	"Peter Andre: Going it Alone"	17 August 2009	1.90
Going it Alone documents the events directly following Andre's split from Katie Price.

=== Series 1: The Next Chapter (2009) ===
- Commissioned by ITV2 in August 2009.

No. in series	Title	Original release date	Viewers (millions)
1	"Episode 1"	8 October 2009	2.10
Pete is on a high as he signs his long-awaited million-pound recording contract. But his mood is shattered when he hears that Katie has been talking about him on TV. He also meets up with pals from Heart FM, goes strawberry picking with the kids, and is interviewed by a Sunday magazine. Plus he celebrates his court victory over a newspaper that printed false stories about him having an affair.
2	"Episode 2"	15 October 2009	1.81
3	"Episode 3"	22 October 2009	1.58
4	"Episode 4"	29 October 2009	1.57
5	"Episode 5"	5 November 2009	1.61
6	"Episode 6"	12 November 2009	1.86

=== Series 2: The Next Chapter II (2010) ===
- Commissioned by ITV2 in January 2010.

No. in series	Title	Original release date	Viewers (millions)
1	"Episode 1"	10 June 2010	1.18
Pete prepares for his first major tour in six years, which means some gruelling dance rehearsals, works on a new children's picture book and also films the music video for his new single, "Defender". Later, he heads off around the country for signings and press appearances, but is forced to return home when news comes in of Katie's marriage to Alex Reid in Las Vegas.
2	"Episode 2"	17 June 2010	1.34
Pete heads off on his first major UK tour in six years, but there are problems in his personal life when a woman he was briefly involved with after his divorce sells her story to the tabloids. He tries to concentrate on his work and looking after his children, but the strain of the situation, combined with a cold, causes him to lose his voice. Later, he is measured for a waxwork at Louis Tussaud's Waxwork museum in Blackpool.
3	"Episode 3"	24 June 2010	1.52
Pete takes his children on holiday to Dubai, staying at a luxurious hotel where he is impressed to hear that he has two live-in butlers and a personal chef. He relaxes on the beach and goes snorkelling in the hotel aquarium, where he swims alongside stingrays and sharks, and takes his family on a boat trip and a safari.
4	"Episode 4"	1 July 2010	1.48
Pete's parents arrive from Australia, and he invites all their British-based relatives to a family reunion, organising a Greek-style barbecue for them to enjoy, and even asking some fans to come along and say hello. The following day he returns to work - and finds he must go on a diet for a magazine cover shoot.
5	"Episode 5"	8 July 2010	1.34
Pete flies to Monaco to present part of the World Music Awards, celebrates his brother's 40th birthday and turns to hypnotherapy to try to overcome his fear of heights. Meanwhile, he takes a look at how the vocals for his latest single, "Defender", are being mixed in the recording studio.
6	"Episode 6"	15 July 2010	1.50
Pete is given the opportunity to present Channel 4's The 5 O'Clock Show for two weeks, and attempts to learn some presenting techniques before his stint. Later, he goes on the road to promote his new aftershave, and prepares to move house with Junior and Princess in tow.
7	"Episode 7"	22 July 2010	1.64
Pete settles into his new house and meets the neighbours. He then heads out on a promotional tour of his children's picture book, and is caught by a group of hostile fans who want his autograph. Later, he travels to Italy for a business trip regarding his upcoming coffee venture.
8	"Episode 8"	29 July 2010	1.64
Pete is given the opportunity to attend Elton John's White Tie and Tiara Ball. Later, he heads to Spain for a photo shoot for his official 2011 calendar, and enjoys time in the sun with friends and family. Pete finally invites everyone over for a family barbecue.

=== Series 3: The Next Chapter III (2010) ===
- Commissioned by ITV2 in June 2010.

No. in series	Title	Original release date	Viewers (millions)
1	"Episode 1"	6 October 2010	1.14
Pete performs at the Midlands Music Festival before taking his children Junior and Princess on a trip back to his native Australia. In Cairns, the family heads out to the Great Barrier Reef for a fishing trip, but things get hairy when the weather turns rough.
2	"Episode 2"	13 October 2010	0.91
Pete's holiday in Australia with his children continues as he heads off to his old family home on the Gold Coast to spend time with his parents. Pete goes surfing, revisits his first job as a beachside toilet attendant and catches up with some old friends.
3	"Episode 3"	20 October 2010	0.89
Pete arrives back in the UK with his brother Danny, Princess and Junior, planning to work on his new album while the children spend the rest of the summer with their mother. Despite being sent home with flu during recording, he is soon off to Blackpool for the unveiling of his waxwork, followed by a performance at the V Festival in Stafford.
4	"Episode 4"	27 October 2010	0.90
Pete heads off to Belfast and Dublin on a promotional tour of his new single, "Defender", and is delighted when Junior and Princess return from their mother's to spend some quality time with him. He later takes the kids to a friend's birthday party and ends up providing the entertainment.
5	"Episode 5"	3 November 2010	1.01
Pete puts the finishing touches to his new album and on a photo shoot for the cover, he tries out some new looks to go with the updated sound of the music. Later, Junior and Princess drop into the studio to see their dad in action, and are given the first copies of his new album, "Accelerate".
6	"Episode 6"	10 November 2010	0.66
Pete launches his new perfume for women, "Mysterious Girl", attends a charity lunch with the cast of Coronation Street, and gives an in-depth interview to the Daily Star. Later, he takes his children to a chocolate factory, and discovers just how messy children can be.
7	"Episode 7"	17 November 2010	0.89
Pete prepares for an appearance on Strictly Come Dancing, where he will be debuting his new single, "Defender". However, his work schedule is threatened by an impending court case involving Katie, and to make matters worse, he gets some worrying news from the doctor.
8	"Episode 8"	24 November 2010	1.06
Pete takes Princess and Junior to buy bikes. Later, he gives a candid interview to a Sunday newspaper, opening up about his music, his upcoming tour and his current relationship status. He then embarks on a big promotional push for his single "Defender", giving phone interviews to regional radio stations, travelling to BBC and Sky studios and appearing on The Alan Titchmarsh Show.

=== Series 4: The Next Chapter IV (2011) ===
- Commissioned by ITV2 in December 2010.

No. in series	Title	Original release date	Viewers (millions)
1	"Episode 1"	28 April 2011	0.86
Pete prepares to embark on a nationwide tour, but his plans are put into jeopardy when he has to be rushed to hospital after suffering from kidney stones. After surgery, he is able to go back to work - but has to tone down the dance routines. He also enjoys a trip to an indoor skiing centre with his brothers, and invites chef Gino D'Acampo and family around for lunch.
2	"Episode 2"	5 May 2011	0.97
Pete makes plans to open a coffee shop and then takes Princess to her first ballet class. Later, the pair meet up with Junior to visit a teddy bear shop, where Peter makes a cuddly toy for Harvey. That evening, he enjoys a night of poker with his brothers and some friends.
3	"Episode 3"	12 May 2011	1.05
Pete meets more than 1,000 fans at a signing for his official calendar and presents the backstage TV coverage of the Brit Awards, where he interviews stars including Alan Carr and Dermot O'Leary. He also meets psychic Derek Acorah, who makes some interesting predictions about his love life, and the children have a Greek lesson and visit the London Aquarium.
4	"Episode 4"	19 May 2011	1.10
Pete heads to Dubai with a group of family and friends to celebrate his 38th birthday. On the eve of the celebrations, his management team is told of a damaging newspaper interview with Katie, but determined not to let the news spoil things, he makes a surprising press interview that quashes all rumours relating to their divorce.
5	"Episode 5"	26 May 2011	1.04
Pete returns from a holiday in Dubai, and prepares to take his family on an alpine adventure to Courcheval in France. Back in the UK, he test-drives a new Ferrari supercar and decides to treat himself to a belated birthday present. He also attends a television awards ceremony, at which he is nominated for Satellite TV Personality of the Year, and pays a visit to his friend Kerry Katona's house.
6	"Episode 6"	9 June 2011	1.07
Pete cooks at a homeless shelter in north London, where he gets to know the residents and volunteers. Later, he prepares to appear at the Children's Champions Awards. On the day of the event, he meets Prime Minister David Cameron, before hosting on the red carpet and performing his single "Perfect Night" live at the ceremony.
7	"Episode 7"	16 June 2011	1.19
Pete works on the development of a range of children's books, promotes for his reality series "Here 2 Help" and gives an in-depth interview to a magazine. At Easter, he takes Princess and Junior to Cyprus, where he is keen for them to explore their Greek heritage.
8	"Episode 8"	23 June 2011	0.93
Pete once again heads to Dubai for a work trip, during which his duties include partying at a fashion show and hitting the catwalk. Back at home, he goes on a blind date with a magazine competition winner, and decides to unwind by throwing a summer fete in his garden.

=== Series 5: Here 2 Help (2011) ===
- During his time off from recording The Next Chapter, and whilst the series was receiving a major overhaul, Andre recorded a special six-part series entitled Here 2 Help, in which he visited six different locations in the United Kingdom and helped a certain group of people in one way or another to achieve a better life.

No. in series	Title	Original release date	Viewers (millions)
1	"Episode 1"	14 July 2011	0.89
Pete visits Solihull in the West Midlands, where he has four days to help a single mum who is struggling to look after her unruly two-year-old son, work long hours as a teacher and engage in a social life.
2	"Episode 2"	21 July 2011	0.88
Pete visits Harrow in north-west London, where he is assigned to help Ignite Trust, a youth centre providing support, activities and outreach work for young people in the area, which is being threatened with closure.
3	"Episode 3"	28 July 2011	1.00
Pete visits Southampton to meet 16-year-old Jodie Lavers, who has asked for his help in bringing her family closer together in the wake of her father's death. Jodie has taken on the lion's share of chores and running of the household to support her mum, and feels that she needs to rediscover her youth.
4	"Episode 4"	4 August 2011	0.84
Pete visits Terry Kemp and Chris Johns, who need help with their Kent and East Sussex-based animal rescue centre Happy Endings. Setting up the sanctuary has taken up all the couple's free time and they are hoping that Pete can help them recruit volunteers, re-home animals and increase the profile of the establishment.
5	"Episode 5"	11 August 2011	0.79
Pete visits the Isle of Wight to help at Ryde Inshore Rescue, an independent lifeboat station staffed by volunteers. His challenge is to fix up their dilapidated building and he is soon bargaining with local builders for materials. He also takes part in a fire drill and visits a residential care home.
6	"Episode 6"	18 August 2011	N/A
Pete visits Thame in Oxfordshire, where he is assigned to help the carnival committee turn around its annual event, which last year had just two floats and hardly any attendees. Peter immediately gets to work promoting the festival as well as planning a float, coming up with ways to get a Mardi Gras feel to the celebration and visiting one of the charities that will benefit from the fundraising. Plus, he meets local resident Robin Gibb, formerly of the Bee Gees.

=== Series 6: My Life (2011) ===
- In 2011, the series received a complete overhaul, being re-titled My Life and receiving new opening titles and theme. The series was commissioned by ITV2 in June 2011.

No. in series	Title	Original release date	Viewers (millions)
1	"Episode 1"	19 October 2011	1.02
Peter takes Junior and Princess on a trip to the Forest of Dean, but there is trouble when fans track him down, and things only seem to get worse when he starts having voice problems ahead of a concert in Newmarket. Later, he goes into the studio to start work on his eighth studio album.
2	"Episode 2"	26 October 2011	0.85
Peter prepares for his first-ever gig in Egypt, where he is joined by his brother Mike. Back in the UK, he focuses on his work raising money for children's causes and goes on the trading floor in the City to pull off some major deals for charity. Later, he finds time to organise kung fu lessons for Junior and Greek tuition for Princess, but then his world is turned upside-down when he is diagnosed with a throat condition that could end his singing career.
3	"Episode 3"	2 November 2011	0.92
Peter prepares to make his debut on the West End stage in the musical Ghost, but his throat problems threaten the performance and he is under strict orders from his speech therapist to take care of his voice. Later, he goes to Cyprus with Mike to see a gig by their brother Chris.
4	"Episode 4"	9 November 2011	0.66
Peter attends the Pride of Britain Awards, where he tasked with presenting an award alongside The Saturdays. At home, he finds time to paint the kids' rooms, with much-needed help from road manager Carl. Unsure whether the children will like his designs, he organises a fancy dress party whilst the rooms are given a once-over from expert Laurence Llewelyn-Bowen.
5	"Episode 5"	7 December 2011	0.91
Peter makes his second appearance on Celebrity Juice and later chats to fans at his calendar signing in a London shopping centre. He also takes the kids on holiday to Spain, but ends up stuck in a tree when he tries to tackle his fear of heights on a trip to an adventure park. Back in England, there is chaos at the grand opening of Peter's first coffee shop when hundreds of fans bring traffic to a standstill.
6	"Episode 6"	14 December 2011	0.76
Peter takes a trip down memory lane when he travels to the Australian jungle to appear as a guest on I'm a Celebrity...Get Me Out of Here! NOW!. Cameras also go behind the scenes with Pete as he gives an in-depth interview to Piers Morgan for his ITV series Piers Morgan's Life Stories.
7	"Episode 7"	21 December 2011	0.90
Christmas Special. Pete prepares for the Christmas season by arranging for Christmas to come early for the Andre household. He hosts a dinner party for family and friends, and later prepares for a Christmas photo-shoot for OK! magazine. He also manages to cause chaos on a turkey farm.
8	"Episode 8"	28 December 2011	0.84
Peter takes his children to Lapland to meet Santa and his elves, but Junior soon becomes anxious as to Santa's existence. Back home, and with his throat problems behind him, Pete prepares for his biggest gig of the year at the Norfolk Showground, in front of 20,000 screaming fans.

=== Series 7: My Life II (2012) ===
No. in series	Title	Original release date	Viewers (millions)
1	"Episode 1"	11 April 2012	1.03
Peter learns that his upcoming nationwide tour is almost sold out, but he has not written any songs yet and the pressure is on to deliver. At home, Junior and Princess are delighted at the arrival of a new addition to the Andre household - pug puppy Charlie. However, while on a charity trip to Zanzibar, Peter receives devastating news about one of his brothers.
2	"Episode 2"	18 April 2012	1.25
Peter is deeply affected by the news of his brother Andrew's illness and decides to drop everything to spend time with him in Australia, where there is an emotional family reunion. While Andrew undergoes tests, Peter takes a trip down memory lane.
3	"Episode 3"	25 April 2012	1.19
Peter heads to a photoshoot in Brighton, prepares for the arrival of his brother Andrew from Australia and meets up with old flame Elen Rives.
4	"Episode 4"	2 May 2012	0.61
Peter goes head to head with Keith Lemon at an awards ceremony, while at home, he and Junior prepare for their next kung fu belt. Peter spends time with his friend Kerry Katona, while former The Only Way Is Essex star Amy Childs asks him to introduce her new range of clothes at a celebrity fashion show.
5	"Episode 5"	16 May 2012	0.91
Peter heads to Dubai for a calendar shoot, feeling anxious about leaving his brother Andrew behind in the UK. On an evening out, a Russian belly dancer catches Peter's eye and he goes on a double date, but things do not go to plan.
6	"Episode 6"	23 May 2012	0.90
Peter prepares for his first gig of the year - and the Norfolk locals are out in force. During a break from chemotherapy, Peter's brother Andrew is well enough to meet up with his siblings at the coffee shop in Brighton.
7	"Episode 7"	30 May 2012	0.90
Peter falls in love while filming Keith Lemon's latest TV show, lets his hair down on a boys' night out and is grilled about his love life on live TV in Dublin. The family rallies round as Andrew undergoes chemotherapy.
8	"Episode 8"	6 June 2012	1.03
Peter heads to Los Angeles to begin recording his new album, where he socialises with famous producers and drives a red Mustang, while Andrew stays at home for his final phase of chemotherapy. After Peter returns to the UK he meets an old flame at a charity ball in Scotland and cooks a Sunday barbecue.

=== Series 8: My Life III (2012—2013) ===
- Episode three was originally due to be aired on 19 December 2012, but due to the death of Andre's brother, Andrew, was postponed and broadcast a week later. Thus, episodes four and five were also broadcast a week late.

No. in series	Title	Original release date	Viewers (millions)
1	"Episode 1"	5 December 2012	1.25
Peter has finally found personal happiness, in the form of his new girlfriend Emily, but his family life remains a struggle after his brother Andrew is diagnosed with life-threatening cancer. Meanwhile, Peter begins promoting his new album, and preparing for his next theatre tour, with a gruelling schedule, which pushes him to the limit.
2	"Episode 2"	12 December 2012	1.02
Peter becomes anxious to complete recording on his new album, recording a collaboration with Lisa Maffia, and flying stateside to work on a new project with Shaggy. Meanwhile, he spends some quality time with Emily at a spa, and plans a photo shoot for his new album cover. However, news concerning his brother leaves him desperate to return home.
3	"Episode 3"	27 December 2012	0.81
Peter begins to feel the strain as rehearsals for his upcoming tour fall behind, and the release of his album hangs in the balance after an issue surrounding the track "Fly Away" arises. As Andrew's condition begins to get worse, he manages to find some solace when girlfriend Emily offers to help him indulge in his new-found passion for art.
4	"Episode 4"	2 January 2013	0.67
Peter is excited as his new album hits the shelves, but a small turn-out at a London album singing and a lack of radio play raises concerns over the album's possible chart position. There is also bad news from back home when Andrew's cancer returns, so Pete decides to organise a family get-together before he takes to the road for his tour.
5	"Episode 5"	9 January 2013	0.67
Peter is left disappointed when his latest album only manages to achieve a lacklustre chart performance, but with a nationwide tour just around the corner, he decides to focus all his efforts on making it one of the best tours he has ever undertook. Life on the road eventually proves to be just the boost he needs, but his brother Andrew's health still remains his top priority. And before the tour can be completed, a family tragedy leaves Peter heartbroken.

=== Series 9: My Life IV (2013) ===
No. in series	Title	Original release date	Viewers (millions)
1	"Episode 1"	4 April 2013	1.11
Four weeks since the death from cancer of his brother Andrew, Pete struggles through postponed tour rehearsals while grieving. Plus, he makes his first public outing, taking girlfriend Emily to the National TV Awards, and he has some much needed time with his children at an adventure park.
2	"Episode 2"	11 April 2013	1.15
Pete is on the road travelling to Leeds and Brighton for the final dates of his concert tour, and it is an emotional end as family and friends turn up to support him following the death of his brother Andrew. Peter and girlfriend Emily head to Malta to pick up an award, which inspires him to take his music career to the international stage, and Princess helps to redecorate Andrew's old bedroom.
3	"Episode 3"	18 April 2013	0.93
With his tour now over, Peter spends his first weekend off relaxing at his girlfriend Emily's family home in Somerset, and although he is still grieving the loss of his brother, he feels ready to start work on some new music in the recording studio. Plus, he plans a Valentine's night that will not be forgotten.
4	"Episode 4"	25 April 2013	0.91
Peter is just days away from his 40th birthday and decides it is time to get back in shape, however the gym routine, a new car and the desire for a tattoo may be the signs of a midlife crisis. Peter also reflects on his situation as a single father when he discovers Junior's mother Katie Price is pregnant.
5	"Episode 5"	2 May 2013	0.87
Peter decides to step back into the limelight with his girlfriend Emily as they attend a magazine party and a TV awards event. A thoughtful birthday gift from manager Claire brings back bittersweet memories for Peter, but it makes him determined to launch his own cancer charity.
6	"Episode 6"	9 May 2013	0.96
Peter is invited to an awards ceremony in London, where he rubs shoulders with Deputy Prime Minister Nick Clegg. Later, Peter surprises his girlfriend Emily by whisking her off to Kenya for a safari holiday, but he is left slightly deflated when she reveals it is not a new experience as she lived in the country as a child.
7	"Episode 7"	16 May 2013	0.99
Peter and girlfriend Emily enjoy a romantic trip to Kenya, but while on safari their car becomes stuck in the middle of a river full of hippos. Later, the couple become stranded when their luxury resort is hit by a huge storm, but on the last day Peter's patience is rewarded as he sees a pride of eight lions.
8	"Episode 8"	23 May 2013	0.87
Inspired after his safari, Peter takes Princess and Junior on a trip to London Zoo before jetting off to Spain for a calendar shoot. Peter shares how aged 40 he finally feels more comfortable in his skin, and enjoys himself when brother Mike and the kids join him for some fun in the sun.

=== Series 10: My Life V (2013) ===
- Andre confirmed prior to broadcast that this series would be his last series on ITV2. This series was extended to 11 episodes to make up for a shorter eighth series.

No. in series	Title	Original release date	Viewers (millions)
1	"Episode 1"	23 September 2013	0.79
Peter tries to make a fresh start after coming to terms with the loss of his brother. He takes over the role of presenter on hit show 60 Minute Makeover, but his notoriously bad time-keeping means he turns up late to the first day's shoot. When he finally does arrive, news spreads fast and the police are called in as fans flock to the quiet neighbourhood.
2	"Episode 2"	30 September 2013	0.71
Peter is starstruck to meet his childhood idol - singer Rick Astley. Later, the family goes to Cyprus for the first time since Andrew's death, and despite the sad memories, there is time to enjoy the holiday. Plus, Peter begins training for his charity bike ride across Zanzibar.
3	"Episode 3"	7 October 2013	0.70
Pete heads to Zanzibar with brother Mike and best friend Carl to take part in a charity bike ride. However, the trip proves to be tougher than expected when an evening of pre-race drinks leaves Pete feeling lonely, and the trio learn just how difficult the event really is when a fellow rider faints on the first day.
4	"Episode 4"	14 October 2013	0.52
Pete continues his charity bike ride in Zanzibar, and pays a visit to the hospital he is raising funds for. Later, back in the UK, the singer faces media speculation about his girlfriend Emily and decides to publicly confirm that she is pregnant.
5	"Episode 5"	21 October 2013	0.77
Following their pregnancy announcement, Pete excitedly prepares for the future with Emily - before he must plough on with his hectic work schedule, which includes promoting his two new fragrances.
6	"Episode 6"	28 October 2013	0.81
Pete takes his children along as he promotes his two new fragrances, before he and pregnant girlfriend Emily present a segment on This Morning. Later, Pete tries to throw a memorable party for older brother Chris's 50th birthday.
7	"Episode 7"	4 November 2013	0.84
Pete decides to adopt a more sophisticated look and tries out his new image at a photoshoot for his tour. He also faces questions on daytime television about girlfriend Emily and her pregnancy, hosts comedy music quiz Never Mind the Buzzcocks and performs two shows in one night to demonstrate he has no plans to slow down.
8	"Episode 8"	11 November 2013	0.92
A nervous Emily makes her first public appearance with her baby bump - on the red carpet at the Pride of Britain Awards - while Pete stocks up on products for their future arrival. Pete then turns his attention to the stage as he prepares to attend his brother Chris's theatre debut.
9	"Episode 9"	9 December 2013	0.66
Pete takes Emily and the kids on holiday to New Orleans, and they arrive just in time for the city's famous Halloween festivities. After a journey into the swamplands of Louisiana in search of alligators, Peter reflects happily on his new family and how close they have become.
10	"Episode 10"	16 December 2013	0.85
Pete tries to cram in as much work as possible with less than three months remaining before Emily's due date, heading to Ireland to promote his new fragrances, before trying to control his nerves as he co-presents the first episode of TV show Sunday Scoop. Pete then heads back into the studio to write and record a track, which sees him head in a new musical direction.
11	"Episode 11"	23 December 2013	0.99
Christmas Special. Pete finds he has little time to enjoy a festive break, with home improvements on his to-do list before Emily brings home the baby. Pete also finds himself performing his classic hit Mysterious Girl and attending a calendar signing as he promotes his upcoming tour, before Emily challenges him to outdo her in the Christmas-present stakes.
