= Free to Love Again =

Single by Katie Price
- Released: 12 July 2010
- Recorded: 2010
- Genre: Pop, dance
- Length: 3:46
- Label: MRP

Katie Price singles chronology
"A Whole New World" (2006)	"Free to Love Again" (2010)	"I Got U" (2017)

"Free to Love Again" is a song by British celebrity and former glamour model Katie Price. It was released as a non-album single on 12 July 2010 for digital download.

Reality TV star Heidi Montag expressed praise for the single and suggested doing a remix and music video with Price for a U.S.-release via her Twitter.

== Track listing ==
- Digital download
1. "Free to Love Again" – 3:46

== Live performances ==
Price performed "Free to Love Again" on GMTV to promote the single on 16 July 2010. She said she didn't write or produce the song, and that she had not been lip-synching like most people thought she was. Price also performed the song at G-A-Y in London.

== Charts ==
Chart (2010)	Peak position
Scottish Singles Sales (Official Charts)	54
UK Singles (Official Charts)	60
UK Singles Downloads (Official Charts)	61
UK Indie (Official Charts)	4

== Release history ==
Region	Date	Label	Format
United Kingdom	12 July 2010	MRP	Digital download
