= Katie Price's Mucky Mansion =

British reality television series

- Genre: Reality; Home improvement
- Directed by: Ross Haley
- Starring: Katie Price
- Country of origin: United Kingdom
- Original language: English
- No. of series: 2
- No. of episodes: 7

Production
- Executive producer: Liz Mills
- Producers: George Dickson; Ross Haley; Danny Vigar
- Running time: 60 minutes (inc. adverts)
- Production company: Captive Minds Media

Original release
- Network: Channel 4
- Release: 26 January 2022 – 14 March 2023

Katie Price's Mucky Mansion is a British reality television and do-it-yourself home improvement series, broadcast on Channel 4 between 26 January 2022 and 14 March 2023. It follows media personality and model Katie Price attempting to renovate her 19-room mansion in Horsham, West Sussex. The series received mixed to negative reviews from critics.

== Production ==
In January 2022, Channel 4 announced the commissioning of Katie Price's Mucky Mansion, a three-part series documenting Katie Price as she attempted to carry out renovations to her 19-room mansion in Horsham, West Sussex. Price also discusses various traumatic events that have occurred and her reasons for experiencing anxiety when returning to her mansion due to bad memories associated with the property. The series was given its title due to the British press dubbing Price's home the "Mucky Mansion" since it was the target of vandals, as well as various problems with the property which saw it fall into disrepair and become uninhabitable. Of the commissioning of the series, Clemency Green, senior commissioning editor for Channel 4, said: "I'm thrilled to have commissioned Captive Minds Media's first projects for Channel 4. In Katie Price's Mucky Mansion, we see a different side to Katie and learn more about her battle with mental health, as well as seeing her close bond with her family. It's compelling viewing." Liz Mills, head of content at Captive Minds Media, added: "It's really exciting for our embryonic company to have kicked off with this fabulous series for C4. I'm sure the audience will be surprised by "crafty" Katie and her unique blend of family, fun and interior design with a real insight into her mental health struggles." The programme began airing the same month, concluding after three episodes in February 2022.

In May 2022, it was reported that series had been renewed for a second series by Channel 4. The network subsequently confirmed the renewal, with the second series of the show airing between February and March 2023, and saw Price renovate further rooms inside and around the property. In August 2023, it was reported that programme had been axed and it therefore did not return for a third series, with Price ultimately selling the property the following year.

== Episodes ==
Series	Episodes	Originally released	
Series	Episodes	First released	Last released
1	3	26 January 2022	9 February 2022
2	4	21 February 2023	14 March 2023

=== Series 1 (2022) ===
No. overall	No. in series	Title	Original release date
1	1	"Episode 1"	26 January 2022
In the first episode of the series, Katie begins putting together ideas for designing her new kitchen, and staples artificial grass to the walls as well as cutting up cuddly toys, in a bid to create a bedroom with a jungle theme for her youngest son, Jett.
2	2	"Episode 2"	2 February 2022
During this week's episode, Katie puts plans into motion as she begins to renovate her kitchen. She then embarks on designing a bedroom for her daughter Princess and is keen to give the room a glamorous makeover from what it once was.
3	3	"Episode 3"	9 February 2022
Katie embarks on redesigning the hallway of her mansion which involves focusing on a primarily pink theme as well as adding a neon sign that reads "Welcome to PriceyWoods". Katie's mother Amy and sister Sophie assist in helping to redesign her garden room.

=== Series 2 (2023) ===
No. overall	No. in series	Title	Original release date
4	1	"Episode 1"	21 February 2023
Katie is forced to call pest control to deal with an infestation, and begins renovating the top floor of her mansion, transforming a bedroom and a lounge, as well as a cinema room which involves her cutting up old discs to stick on a coffee table.
5	2	"Episode 2"	28 February 2023
In this week's episode, Katie begins to renovate her youngest daughter Bunny's bedroom and aims to give it an underwater mermaid theme, which involves her sticking shells from the beach on a lamp. Katie also ramps her home security following cyber threats.
6	3	"Episode 3"	7 March 2023
Katie continues her home transformation as she embarks on a renovation of her makeup room. She subsequently begins to renovate her stables, as well as reflecting on a recent incident with the paparazzi and the effects it has had on her.
7	4	"Episode 4"	14 March 2023
In the final episode, Katie enlists the help of her mother and sister again to create an office with a Barbie theme, as well as calling in a professional to assist in clearing out her wardrobe. Katie's renovation suffers a setback following a flood.

== Reception ==
Emily Watkins of the The i Paper newspaper praised the programme and said "Price in her monogrammed, diamanté-studded hard hat felt like more than just entertaining footage: rather, a suggestion that, piece by piece, room by room, Katie Price herself is rebuilding." Anita Singh of The Daily Telegraph reviewed the programme negatively, giving it 1 out of 5 stars and described Price's attempt at some image rehabilitation as ill-judged and insensitive. She added "is there anything positive to be said about this show? Well, her handyman seems nice. That's about it. Channel 4 should be better than this." Ed Power of The Irish Times described the show as "When Celebrity Big Brother meets Dermot Bannon and said the show "should do more to explore Price's sense of herself as a groundbreaker. Instead we're treated to Price and her partner Carl Woods chucking old furniture out of a top-floor window – the logic is that it's easier than carrying it down three flights of stairs. As property-makeover telly it's fine. As a profile in celebrity, Katie Price's Mucky Mansion stands on flaky foundations."
