= A Whole New World (album) =

Studio album by Peter Andre and Katie Price
- Released: 27 November 2006
- Recorded: 2004–2006
- Genre: Pop
- Length: 43:19
- Labels: K & P Recordings
- Producer: Peter Andre

Peter Andre chronology
The Platinum Collection (2005)	A Whole New World (2006)	Revelation (2009)

Singles from A Whole New World
- 1. "A Whole New World" Released: 4 December 2006

Professional ratings
Review scores
Source	Rating
AllMusic	1.5/5 stars

A Whole New World is the fifth studio album released by British-Australian singer-songwriter Peter Andre, in collaboration with his then wife Katie Price. It is Price's only album release.

== Background ==
After being dropped from East West Records, Andre began recording songs with his then current wife, Katie Price, in their private recording studio in Surrey. Andre planned to keep the songs as private recordings, and had decided to change his focus from the music industry to his family. However, several of the songs were leaked onto the internet in 2006. Andre was later contacted by Absolute Marketing and Universal Music Group, who perceived an interest in releasing the recordings as an album. The album was officially released on 27 November 2006. The album was certified Gold in the UK, awarded for 100,000 copies of the album being shipped to stores. Only the title track was released as a single from the album, on 11 December 2006. Due to poor sales and no promotion, Andre and Price were dropped from the label.

The album has since gained some attention for the many five-star reviews on its Amazon.co.uk listing that, although ostensibly positive in the extreme, are largely written in a tongue-in-cheek style. Some praise the album for its "medical" applications, satirically claiming it has cured such conditions as asthma and constipation.

== Track listing ==
1. "A Whole New World" – 4:35
2. "The Best Things in Life Are Free" – 4:12
3. "Endless Love" – 4:27
4. "Islands in the Stream" – 4:09
5. "Tonight I Celebrate My Love for You" – 3:41
6. "Cherish" – 4:05
7. "The Two of Us" – 4:01
8. "I Come Down" – 3:59
9. "Don't Go Breaking My Heart" – 4:23
10. "To Die For" – 3:54
11. "I've Had The Time of My Life" – 4:37
12. "Lullaby" – 3:03

== Charts ==
=== Weekly charts ===
Chart (2006)	Peak position
Euro Albums Hot 100	25
Scottish Albums (Official Charts)	29
UK Albums (Official Charts)	20

=== Year-end charts ===
Chart (2006)	Position
UK Albums (OCC)	139

== Certifications ==
Country	Provider	Certification	Sales
United Kingdom	BPI	Gold	150,000+
