= Katie & Peter =

- Directed by: Tom Lopez; Charlie Carpenter
- Starring: Katie Price and Peter Andre
- Narrated by: Terry Wogan; Samantha Womack; Charlie Brooks; Lola Buckley
- Composer: Hendricks Audio
- Countries of origin: United Kingdom; United States
- No. of series: 9
- No. of episodes: 74

Production
- Producers: Tom Lopez; Charlie Carpenter; Jamie Zwaig
- Production location: The London Studios
- Running time: 60–90 minutes (including adverts)
- Production company: Can Associates TV

Original release
- Network: ITV; ITV2; E!
- Release: 12 November 2004 – 9 June 2009

Related
- Katie; Peter Andre: My Life

The Katie & Peter franchise is a series of ITV and ITV2 shows that documented glamour model Katie Price (previously known under the pseudonym "Jordan") and her then-husband Peter Andre. The franchise included several fly on the wall reality series and a short lived late-night chat show. The pair's separation has resulted in individual shows related to the franchise being recorded, including Katie and Peter Andre: My Life.

== When Jordan Met Peter ==
The Katie & Peter franchise was launched after the success of a six-part documentary series broadcast on ITV in November and December 2004. Entitled "When Jordan Met Peter", the series, narrated by Terry Wogan, charted the first six weeks of the pair's relationship following their meeting on I'm a Celebrity....Get Me Out of Here. The first episode aired on 12 November 2004, and the final episode aired on 17 December. The series earned more than 1 million viewers, and as such, following its success, a further series was commissioned for broadcast in 2005.

== Jordan & Peter: Laid Bare ==
Following the success of When Jordan Met Peter, a new ten-part series, entitled Jordan & Peter: Laid Bare, was commissioned by ITV2. Narrated by Samantha Womack, the series charted the pair's first Christmas together, and revealed what they believe the future holds for them. The first episode aired on 21 January 2005, and the last episode aired on 2 April. The series was not as successful as When Jordan Met Peter, but still managed to average more than 750,000 viewers per episode. A best bits episode was aired on 23 May 2005.

== Jordan & Peter: Marriage and Mayhem ==
A further six-part series, entitled Jordan & Peter - Marriage and Mayhem, was commissioned by ITV2, following the news of Katie Price's pregnancy. The series followed the birth of Junior, the pair's wedding, and how Pete had to cope with Katie's post-natal depression. Narrated by Lola Buckley, the first episode aired on 23 September 2005, and the last episode aired on 28 October. The series once again averaged more than 750,000 viewers per episode.

== Katie & Peter: The Next Chapter ==
The duo's next reality series did not hit screens until 2007, following the pair's recording of a duet album. The series was commissioned by ITV2 in late 2006. The series follows life two years on from Junior's birth, and the impending arrival of the pair's second child, Princess. The first episode aired on 19 April 2007, and the last episode aired on 7 June, with a total of eight episodes. The series became their most successful series to date, averaging 1,250,000 viewers per episode. A second, ten-part series began airing on 24 April 2008, and concluded on 3 July 2008. A third and final seven-part series began airing on 11 September 2008, and concluded on 23 October.

== Katie & Peter: The Baby Diaries ==
The Baby Diaries was a short four-episode follow up to The Next Chapter, charting the first six weeks following Princess Tiami's birth. The first episode was aired on 5 July 2007, and the final episode on 26 July.

== Katie & Peter: Unleashed ==
Katie & Peter: Unleashed was a late night chat-show hosted by the couple. The eight-episode series proved unpopular with viewers. The first episode aired on 19 October 2007, and the final episode aired on 11 December.

== Katie & Peter: Down Under ==
Similarly to The Baby Diaries, Down Under was a short four-episode follow up to The Next Chapter, charting the pair's holiday to Australia in January 2008. The first episode was aired on 27 March 2008, and the final episode on 17 April.

== Katie & Peter: African Adventures ==
Similarly to Down Under and The Baby Diaries, African Adventures was a two-part documentary following the family on a safari adventure holiday in Africa. Episode one aired on 30 October 2008, and episode two aired on 6 November.

== Katie & Peter: Stateside ==
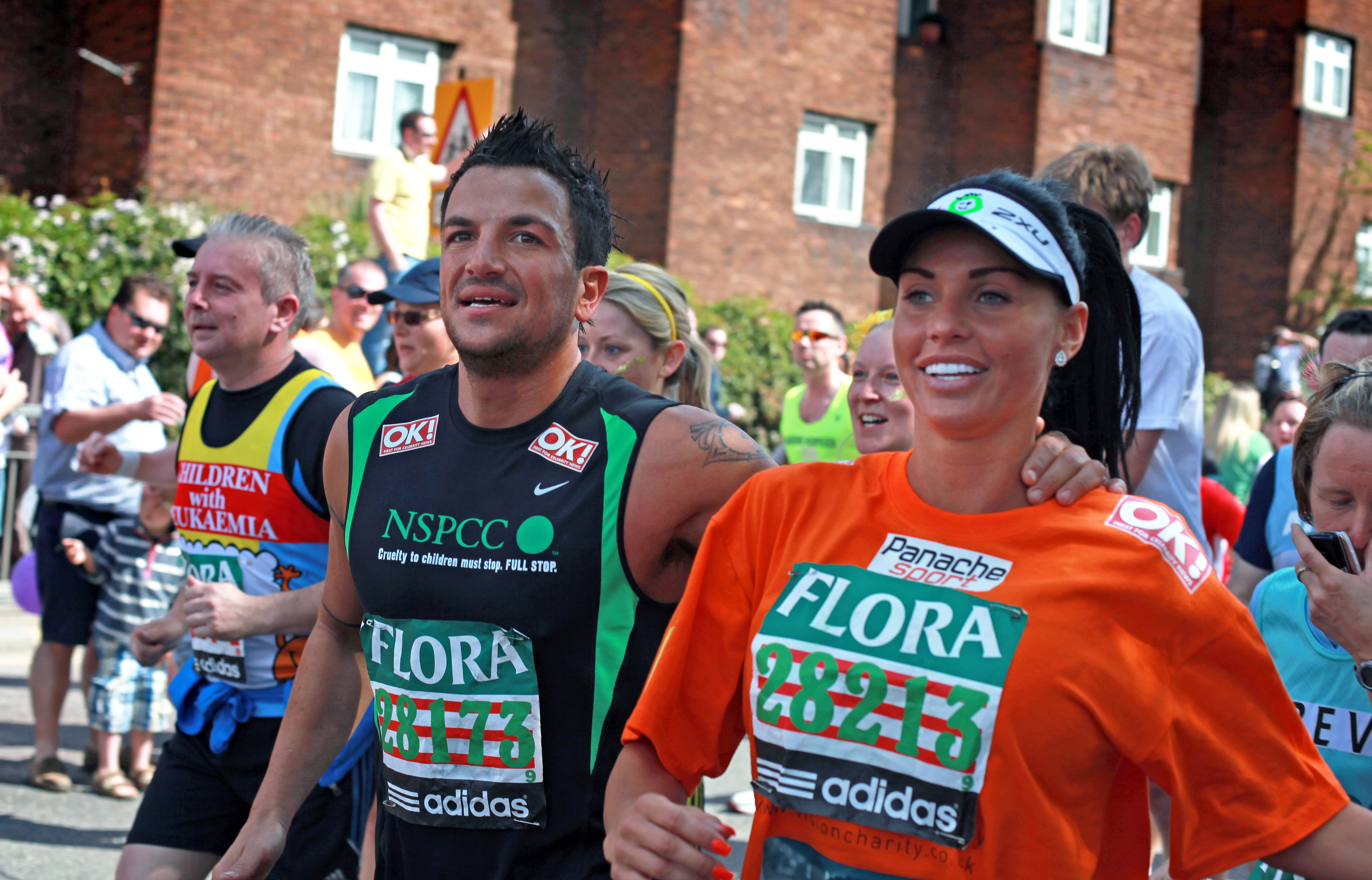
Katie Price and Peter Andre during the 2009 London Marathon, which featured in the last episode of the franchise.

Katie & Peter: Stateside became the final series in the franchise, following the family as they relocated to Malibu for three months, whilst Peter recorded his comeback album Revelation, and their son Harvey attended a special school which helped with his condition. The eight-part series aired from 16 April to 9 June 2009.
