= Hurricane (Katie Price song) =

2019 song by Katie Price

Single by Katie Price
- Released: 25 July 2019
- Recorded: 2019
- Genre: Dance-pop
- Length: 2:56
- Label: Self-released
- Songwriter: Katie Price
- Producer: Rick Live

Katie Price singles chronology
"I Got U" (2017)	"Hurricane" (2019)	"Best of Me" (2025)

"Hurricane" is a song by English media personality and former glamour model Katie Price released on 25 July 2019. Written by Price and produced by Rick Live, it is a dance-pop song which was independently released through Price's own record label. In September 2025, the song charted at number 19 on the UK Singles Downloads Chart following a resurgence of interest in Price's music .

== Background and release ==
Price relaunched her music career two years prior with a single "I Got U". "Hurricane", a dance-pop song written by Price and produced by Rick Live, was independently released through Price's own record label on 25 July 2019. To promote "Hurricane", a month prior to its release, Price performed the song at a pool party at the BH Mallorca resort in Magaluf, Spain. She subsequently performed the song at various other events including at a pub in Taunton.

== Reception ==
"Hurricane" received mixed to negative reviews, with critics noting that Price's live vocals needed significant work. The song was described as a "flawless summer bop" by CultureFix, however Price's live performance in Taunton was described as chaotic, with Price struggling to hit notes and forgetting lyrics. The song re-entered the iTunes chart in August 2025, alongside "I Got U", following a resurgence of interest in Price's music and reached 19 in the UK Singles Downloads Chart.

== Track listing ==
Digital download
No.	Title	Length
1.	"Hurricane"	2:56

== Charts ==
"Hurricane" chart performance
Chart (2025)	Peak position
UK Singles Sales (OCC)	20

== Personnel ==
- Katie Price – vocals, songwriter
- Rick Live – producer

== Release history ==
Region	Date	Format	Label	Ref.
Various	25 July 2019	Digital download, streaming	Self-released	
