= Katie (British TV series) =

- Also known as: What Katie Did Next (2009–2010); Katie (2011–2012)
- Starring: Katie Price; Ruby Randall
- Narrated by: Guy Porritt; Jemma Bolt
- Country of origin: United Kingdom
- No. of series: 3 (ITV2) plus a televised marriage special 2 (Sky Living); 4 (Quest Red)
- No. of episodes: 25 (ITV2); 18 (Sky Living); 30 (Quest Red)

Production
- Running time: 42–48 minutes
- Production companies: ITV Studios and Pricey Media (2009–2010); BSkyB (2011–2012); Multistory Media (2017–present)

Original release
- Network: ITV2
- Release: 27 August 2009 – 11 November 2010
- Network: Sky Living
- Release: 22 March 2011 – 7 August 2012
- Network: Quest Red (2017–2020)
- Release: 10 July 2017 – 4 May 2020

Related
- Peter Andre: My Life; Katie: Standing Up For Harvey; Signed by Katie Price; Katie Price’s Pony Club

Katie Price: My Crazy Life (also known as What Katie Did Next and Katie) is a British reality television show documenting the life of Katie Price, a model and television personality.

== Scenario ==
Reality TV show that documents the life of model and television personality Katie Price.

== Series overview ==
Season	Episodes	First airdate	Last airdate
1	6	27 August 2009	1 October 2009
2	8	11 February 2010	1 April 2010
3	8	23 September 2010	11 November 2010
4	8	22 March 2011	10 May 2011
5	10	5 June 2012	7 August 2012
6	12	10 July 2017	14 August 2017
7	7	16 July 2018	10 December 2018
8	10	8 April 2019	16 December 2019
9	1	4 May 2020	TBA

Katie is a reality TV show depicting the life of Katie Price, a model and television personality.

== Reception ==
The show hit it off with high ratings - pulling in almost 5.5 million viewers across all platforms - original broadcasts, YouTube, TV repeats and online - the highest Sky Living has ever reached.

== Broadcast ==
The first three seasons of the show were broadcast on British television channel ITV2. Its first season, consisting of 6 episodes, aired from 27 August to 1 October 2009. Its first episode garnered 1.8 million viewers. The show's second season consisted of 8 episodes airing from 11 February to 1 April achieving an average of 2.3 million viewers; the 3-part wedding special Katie and Alex: For Better for Worse eventually followed on 14 July until 28 July 2010. The third season, the last with ITV2, was broadcast from 23 September until 11 November 2010.

Her 2-year contract with Sky Living saw a change for the show's fourth season in channel and name. This season is currently broadcast on Sky Living and is simply titled Katie to reflect the start of her new coalition with Sky. This was the first season to be broadcast in HD. The fourth season started on 22 March. The fifth and final series aired from 5 June to 10 August 2012. The sixth season aired in late 2017, it is still going as of 19 August 2017 on Quest Red
