= Katie Price =

English media personality and model (born 1978)

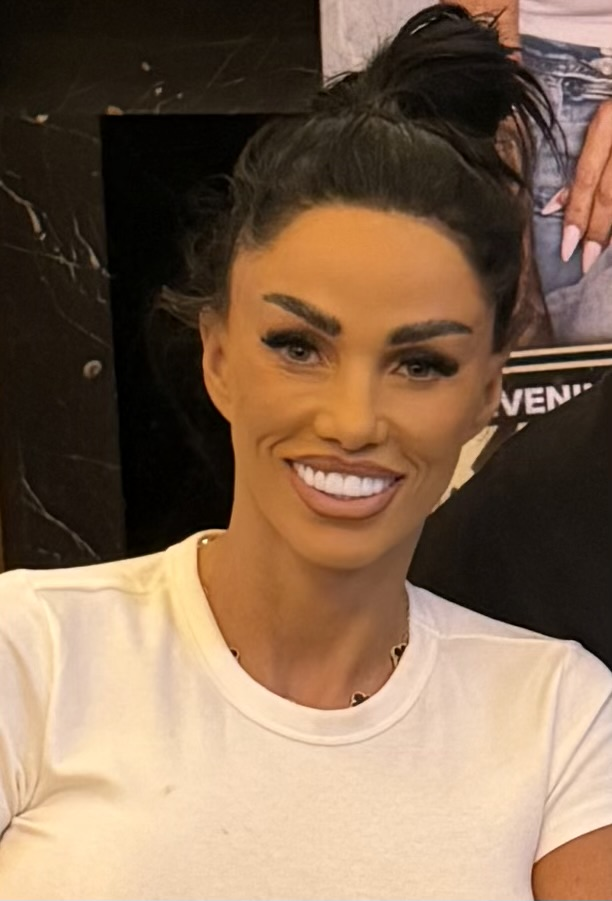
- Price in 2025
- Born: Katrina Amy Alexandra Alexis Infield; 22 May 1978 (age 48); Brighton, East Sussex, England
- Other name: Jordan
- Education: Blatchington Mill School and Sixth Form College
- Occupations: Media personality; model; businesswoman
- Years active: 1996–present
- Height: 5 ft 5 in (1.65 m)
- Spouses: Peter Andre (m. 2005; div. 2009) Alex Reid (m. 2010; div. 2011) Kieran Hayler (m. 2013; div. 2021) Lee Andrews (m. 2026)
- Children: 5, including Princess Andre

Katie Price (born Katrina Amy Alexandra Alexis Infield; 22 May 1978) is an English media personality, model and businesswoman. She gained recognition in the late 1990s for her glamour modelling work in British tabloid newspapers, including Page 3 in The Sun and the Daily Star, billed under the pseudonym Jordan.

Price later expanded her career as a television and media personality. In 2004, she was a contestant on the third series of the ITV reality show I'm a Celebrity...Get Me Out of Here! and the following year, she was runner-up in the search for the UK's entry for the Eurovision Song Contest. Price returned to I'm a Celebrity...Get Me Out of Here! for its ninth series in 2009, and was the winner of the fifteenth series of Celebrity Big Brother in 2015. She has also starred in her own reality series and documentaries, including Katie & Peter (2004–2009), Katie (2009–2012), Signed by Katie Price (2011), Katie Price: My Crazy Life (2017–2020), Katie Price's Mucky Mansion (2022–2023), and Katie Price: Nothing to Hide (2026).

As an author, Price has released eight autobiographies, eleven novels, one fashion book, and two series of children's books. Her business ventures include fashion lines, beauty products, and equestrian-related enterprises. She has also ventured into music, releasing one studio album (with Peter Andre) and five standalone singles. Price's personal life, including her relationships, financial matters, legal proceedings and cosmetic procedures, has attracted significant media attention and controversy, and as a result she is regularly the subject of the British tabloid press.

== Early life ==
Price was born Katrina Amy Alexandra Alexis Infield on 22 May 1978 in Brighton, East Sussex. She is the only child of Ray and Amy Infield (née Charlier). Her father left the family when she was four, and in 1988 her mother married builder Paul Price. She has an older brother named Daniel and a younger sister named Sophie. She is of Italian, Spanish, English and Jewish descent. Price's maternal grandmother was Jewish, but she is not religious.

Price attended Blatchington Mill School in Hove in East Sussex. She excelled at sport, swimming for Sussex in regional competitions. During her childhood, she also developed a passion for horses and horse-riding. She began modelling as a child, and at 13 she modelled for a clothing line. At the age of 17, she changed her name, dropping the surname of her birth father Ray, who had left home when she was four, and taking the last name of her mother's second husband, Paul Price.

== Career ==
=== 1996–2004: Modelling career and early ventures ===
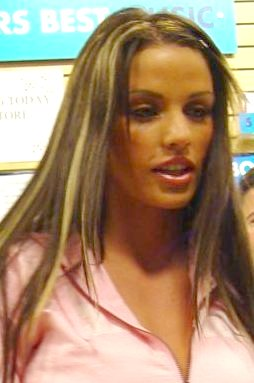
Price at a book signing of her debut autobiography Being Jordan in July 2004

At a friend's suggestion, Price had professional photographs taken and decided to pursue a modelling career. The pictures were sent to a modelling agency in London, and in 1996 she appeared, billed as "Jordan", on Page 3 in the British newspaper The Sun. As Jordan, Price was famed for her surgically enhanced breasts. At 20, she had the first in a succession of breast-enhancement surgeries, increasing her natural 32B to a 32FF.

Price also regularly appeared in the Daily Star, FHM, the British edition of Playboy, Nuts, Maxim, Loaded, Vogue and Esquire. In 2002, she appeared on the September cover of the American edition of Playboy magazine. Price also appeared on The Big Breakfast.

In 2004, Price was a contestant on the third series of I'm a Celebrity...Get Me Out of Here!, between the months of January and February. Whilst appearing on the programme, she met Peter Andre, whom she would eventually marry and have two children with, prior to their divorce. The same year, she made cameo appearances as herself in the television dramas Dream Team and Footballers' Wives. She also appeared on Top Gear's "Star in a Reasonably Priced Car", completing the lap in one minute and fifty-two seconds.

Price released her first autobiography, Being Jordan, in May 2004. Price conducted a 10-day book-signing tour which helped to propel her to first position in the Nielsen BookScan hardback sales chart and to sell 97,090 copies in one year, and over 1,000,000 as of January 2007.

=== 2005–2010: Reality television, music and books ===
Price has been the subject of several reality television series and documentaries that have chronicled her domestic life. She had previously appeared in a Channel 4 documentary by film-maker Richard Macer, Jordan: The Truth About Me in 2002, and appeared in two more Jordan: The Model Mum and Jordan: You Don't Even Know Me in 2004, which was followed by Jordan Gets Even on Five the same year. She subsequently appeared in another documentary Jordan: Living With a Dream on Channel 4. Following her appearance on I'm a Celebrity...Get Me Out of Here! and the beginning of her relationship with Andre, their Katie & Peter reality television franchise launched on ITV2, which documented the lives of Price and Andre and included several versions of the fly-on-the-wall reality series, including When Jordan Met Peter, Jordan & Peter: Laid Bare and Jordan & Peter: Marriage and Mayhem between 2004 and 2005; Katie & Peter: The Next Chapter, Katie & Peter: The Baby Diaries and Katie & Peter: Unleashed in 2007; Katie & Peter: Down Under and Katie & Peter: African Adventures in 2008; and Katie & Peter: Stateside in 2009. The pair's separation in 2009 resulted in their individual shows being recorded. Price appeared in a series with her second husband Alex Reid, with What Katie Did Next continuing on ITV2 until 2011.

Price was runner-up in the selection contest for a representative for the United Kingdom at the Eurovision Song Contest 2005. The selection process, then titled Making Your Mind Up, was broadcast live on television in March 2005. Price sang a song titled "Not Just Anybody".

Price's second autobiography, A Whole New World, was published in January 2006. It reached number two in the hardback general category and sold 198,105 copies by 1 April 2006. She went on to release her debut studio album with the same title, A Whole New World, in collaboration with Peter Andre. She also launched a lingerie range which was sold at George at Asda and her debut novel Angel. The same year, Price signed a £300,000 advance with Random House for Katie Price's Perfect Ponies, a series of children's books, with the first six released in 2007, and Price continuing to release several more. Price was in the top 100 best-selling authors of the decade for book sales between 2000 and 2009, with nearly three million sales.

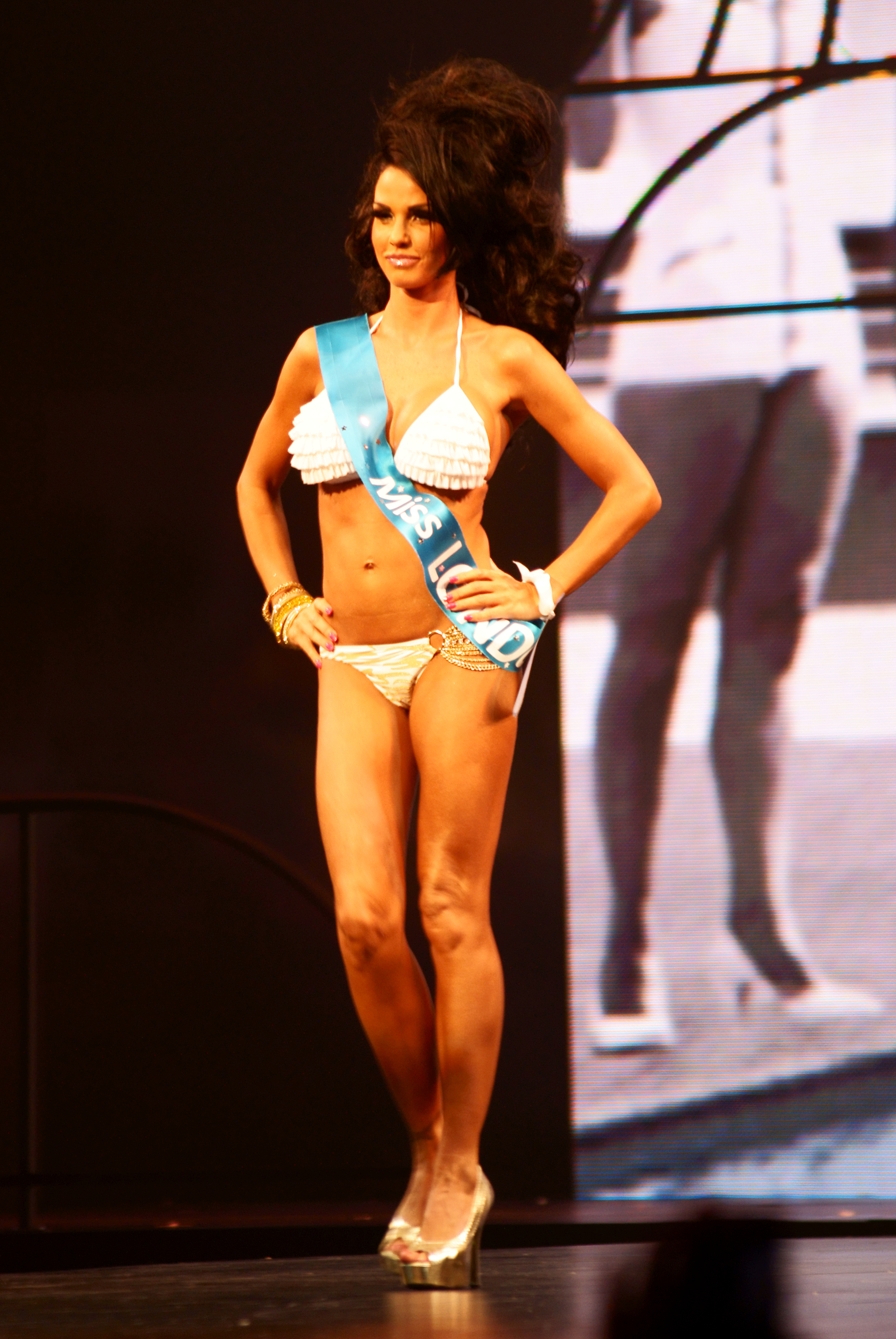
Price modelling at the Clothes Show Live in May 2009

In 2007, Price launched her debut fragrance, Stunning. Price's second novel, Crystal, about a young woman's efforts to become a singer, sold 159,407 copies during the first three months after its release in June 2007. In 2008, Price published her third novel Angel Uncovered and autobiography Pushed to the Limit, as well as releasing her second fragrance Besotted. She subsequently signed a deal with Derby House to launch her equestrian range of clothing named "KP Equestrian". In 2009 Price was named as the patron of a charity polo match played near Epping, Essex.

In July 2009, Price released a novel entitled Sapphire, which was number 1 on the hardback fiction chart for four consecutive weeks and sold 42,215 copies in its first two weeks in the UK alone. She also released a fashion book Standing Out. In November 2009, Price returned to I'm a Celebrity... Get Me Out of Here! as a contestant on the ninth series. She is the only contestant to have competed in two separate series of the show. Price was voted to do six consecutive bushtucker trials by the public, after which she voluntarily withdrew from the series after nine days, stating that "It's not about the money, it's not about winning for me - I just didn't want to be [in the jungle] any more."

In July 2010, Price released "Free to Love Again", a non-album single. About the release, she said: "I'm not a singer, this is just something that I'm doing for fun. It's not like I'm worried about getting a chart position or number one, this is purely for fun." Price released her fifth novel, Paradise, the same month. In October 2010, Price released her fourth autobiography You Only Live Once. The following month, she released another fragrance Precious Love.

=== 2011–2018: Further television and other ventures ===
In 2011, Price fronted the Sky Living reality series Signed by Katie Price which featured contestants competing to be signed by Price's management company, several of which went on to have careers in the media industry, including Rylan Clark, Jemma Lucy and the programme's winner Amy Willerton. The same year, she began starring in another version of her self titled reality series on the same network. Price also debuted new fashion ranges titled Day 22 and Katie's Boutique, the latter of which was in collaboration with Store Twenty One, as well as releasing her next novels The Comeback Girl and Santa Baby. In 2012, Price obtained her own column in The Sun on Sunday and released her eighth novel In the Name of Love. Price released her fifth autobiography Love, Lipstick and Lies and a further novel He's the One in 2013. In 2014, she released her tenth novel, Make My Wish Come True. Price also went on to launch her next fragrances Kissable (2013) and Kissable Fierce (2014).

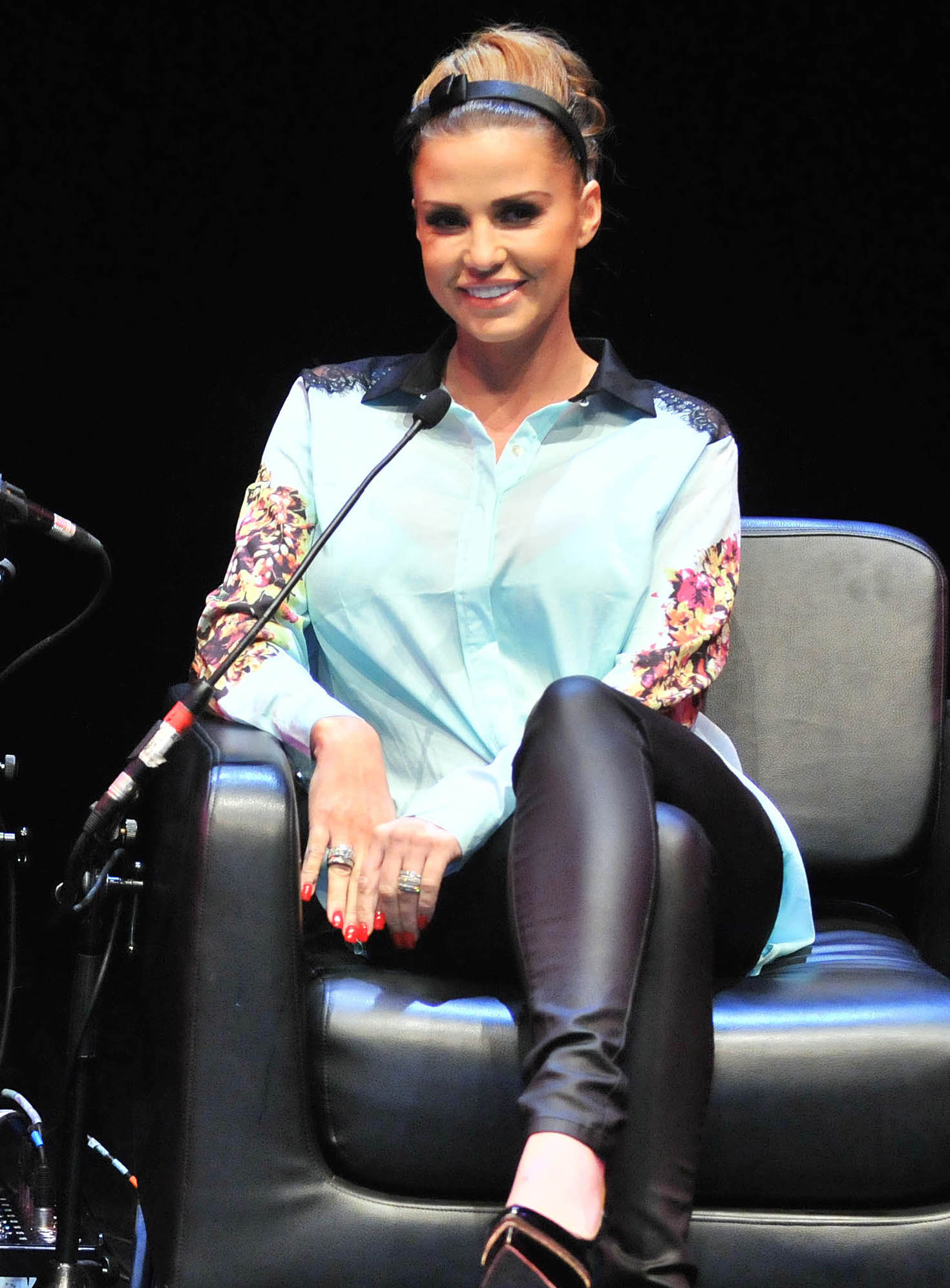
Price at the Women of the World Festival in March 2014

In January 2015, Price became a housemate on the fifteenth series of Celebrity Big Brother, entering the house late on Day 10. She had been previously invited to appear on the show several times. In February 2015, Price reached the final and ultimately won the series. She also appeared on the Channel 5 series In Therapy. Between 2015 and 2018, Price served as a regular panellist on the talk show Loose Women.

In 2016, Price released her sixth autobiography Reborn. Between 2017 and 2020, she appeared in another version of her reality series Katie Price: My Crazy Life on Quest Red. In 2017, she released another fragrance, Purple Heart and returned to music, releasing her comeback single "I Got U" in June of that year, which she performed live on Loose Women. Price also launched a range of nutrition supplements, including meal replacement shakes, that were promoted with unsupported claims about their wholesomeness and benefit. The British Dietetic Association named Katie Price Nutritional Supplements as constituting one of the "top 5 worst celeb diets to avoid in 2018", noting they were expensive and unnecessary for anybody wanting to lose weight. The following year, she released another novel Playing with Fire.

In 2018, following online abuse focused on her son Harvey, Price began a campaign to make online abuse a criminal offence. She subsequently took her campaign to Parliament. Helen Jones, chairman of the parliamentary Petitions Committee subsequently commented: "The law on online abuse is not fit for purpose and it is truly shameful that disabled people have been forced off social media while their abusers face no consequences. There is no excuse for the continued failure to make online platforms as safe for disabled people as non-disabled people. Self-regulation has failed disabled people and the law must change to ensure more lives are not destroyed." and went on to make recommendations for legislation. The Government was expected to respond to the recommendations by the end of March 2019.

=== 2019–present: OnlyFans, documentaries and music resurgence ===
In 2019, Price released her next single "Hurricane", next novel Winner Takes All and subsequently launched a YouTube channel, often posting vlogs which featured her children and members of her family. In April 2020, Price appeared on the second series of Celebrity SAS: Who Dares Wins. She was the first recruit to voluntarily withdraw from the course in the second episode, after a challenge in which they were required to lift sandbags above their head, which Price struggled with due to a recent breast surgery. In 2021, Price was a contestant on the sixteenth series of Celebrity MasterChef. Price went on to front the BBC documentaries Katie Price: Harvey & Me (2021) and Katie Price: What Harvey Did Next (2022), which documented Price's life caring for her son Harvey and their experiences. She also released a book, Katie Price: Harvey and Me in 2021.

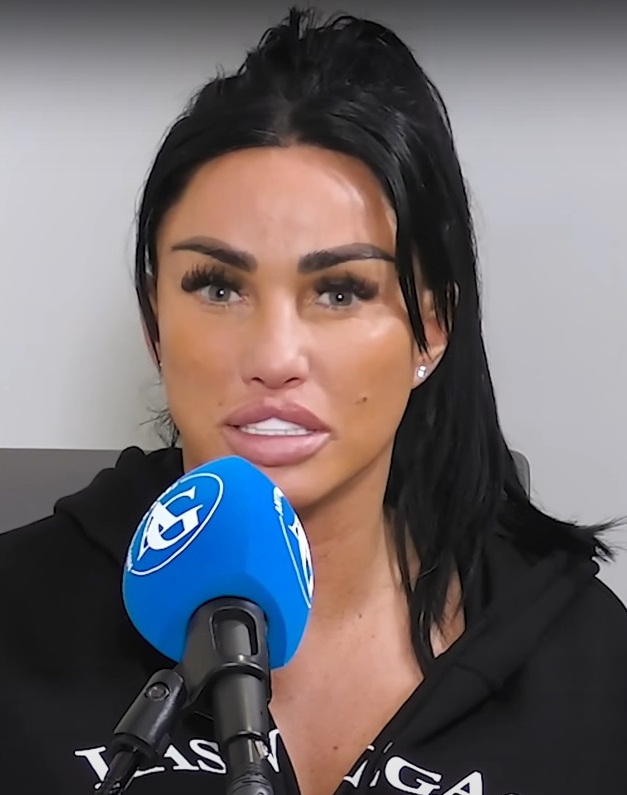
Price speaking about her life on Anything Goes with James English podcast in March 2024

In January 2022, Price joined OnlyFans. She dressed as a nun and sported a sash with the words "my body, my rules" printed on it to promote her debut on the site and said that it was "something [she was] born to do", citing the decline in lads mags and OnlyFans giving creators control over what they post, describing it as a "safer way of making content." Between 2022 and 2023, she starred in the Channel 4 series Katie Price's Mucky Mansion which documented Price's attempts to renovate the property. Price also appeared in a documentary for Channel 4 titled Katie Price: Trauma and Me in September 2022, which featured Price discussing her mental health and experiences. In 2023, she began hosting a podcast The Katie Price Show, and embarked on a live show version the following year. Price also launched a business Scented by Katie Price, specialising in products such as bath bombs and wax melts.

In July 2024, Price released her eighth autobiography titled This Is Me: The High Life, The Dark Times, The Full Story. In January 2025, Price appeared in Channel 4 series Katie Price: Making Babies which featured her and then-boyfriend Carl Woods undergoing IVF treatment. In August 2025, following a campaign to support Price resulting in a resurgence of interest in her music, her songs "I Got U", released in 2017, and "Hurricane", released in 2019, reached number 2 and number 20 on the UK Singles Sales Chart respectively, with Price announcing her intention to release further music. She subsequently went on to release her comeback single "Best of Me" featuring Lady Ice in October 2025, and a Christmas song "This Christmas" featuring Mhina in December. Between September and November 2025, Price embarked on a tour alongside Kerry Katona in which they toured venues, performing songs from their discography and discussing their lives. In 2026, Price appeared on an episode of Olivia Attwood: Getting Filthy Rich where she discussed her OnlyFans career and the introduction of an AI chatbot version of herself. She also starred in a Sky documentary series, Katie Price: Nothing to Hide.

== Public image ==
Throughout her career, Price has been a subject of press and tabloid attention. Her highly publicised personal life, including relationships, marriages, financial matters and legal battles, have become staples of British press coverage. In December 2022, Price was the subject of a Channel 5 documentary Shameless: The Rise & Fall of Katie Price.

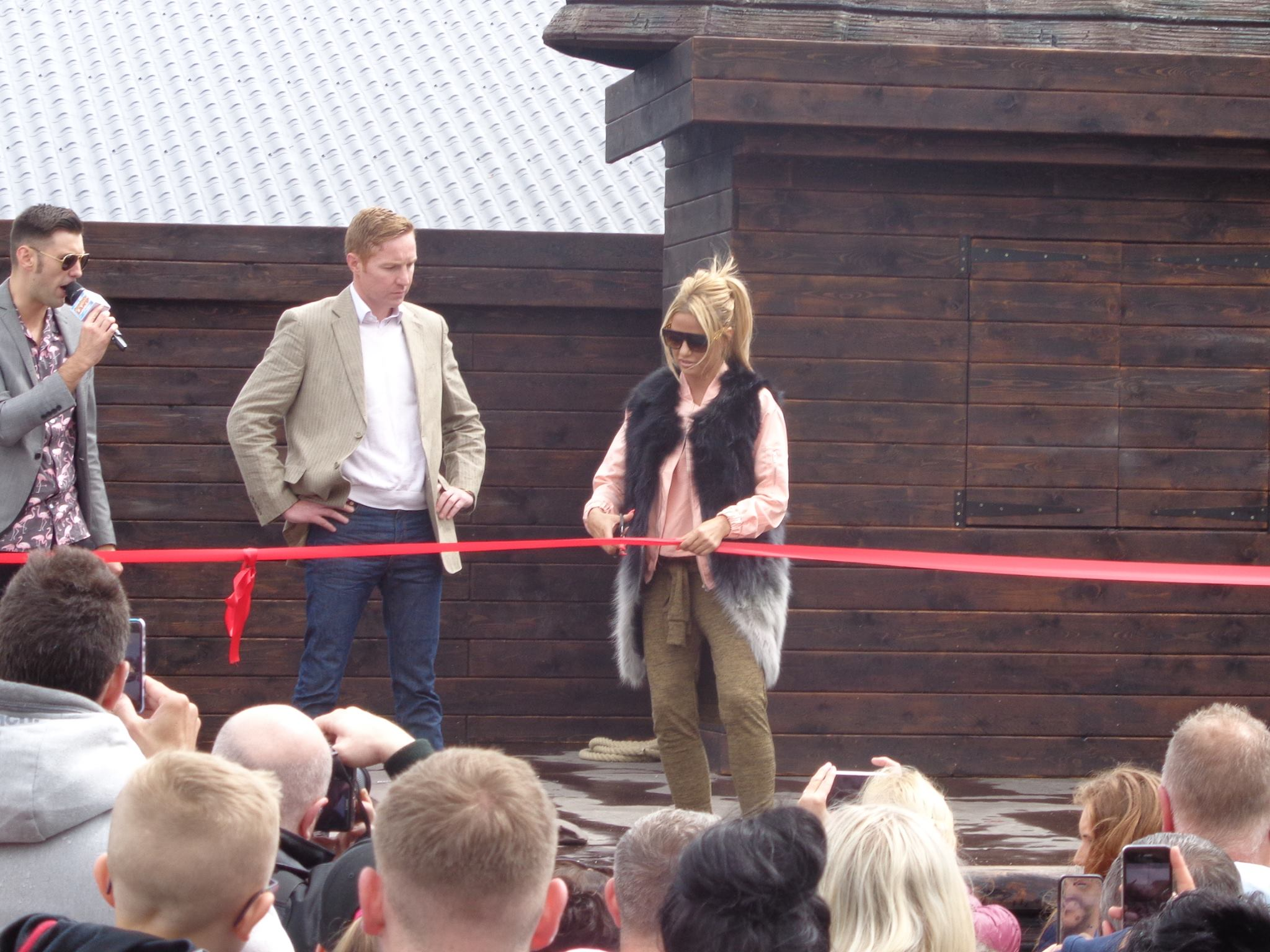
Price cutting the ribbon at the opening of the Pirates of Zanzibar attraction at Flamingo Land Resort alongside Ryan Swain and Gordon Gibb in June 2016

As Jordan, Price was notable for her surgically enhanced breasts. in 2004, she won the Cover Girl of the Decade award at the Loaded Awards. Coverage of her changing appearance, including extensive cosmetic procedures, has often generated both criticism and discussion regarding beauty expectations in the entertainment industry.

In the 2001 UK general election, Price stood as an independent candidate in the Stretford and Urmston constituency. She gained 713 votes. The seat was won by Labour's Beverley Hughes with 23,836 votes.

Price has received attention for her advocacy work, particularly in campaigning against online bullying, influenced in part by her experiences with her disabled son Harvey. She initiated a petition garnering over 220,000 signatures to make online abuse a criminal offense, leading to Parliamentary support for "Harvey's Law" to protect disabled individuals.

In 2022, Price created an OnlyFans account as part of a wider reinvention of her public image and business brand. It is reported that she earns between £50,000 and £80,000 monthly from OnlyFans.

Price is considered a prominent figure within the British hun subculture. Her popularity within the LGBT community has seen her make various appearances at pride events, including Bristol Pride, Manchester Pride, and Portsmouth Pride. She was nominated as a celebrity ally for the British LGBT Awards in 2015.

== Personal life ==
=== Relationships and family ===
Price gave birth to her first child, son Harvey, in May 2002. His father is since-retired footballer Dwight Yorke. Harvey was found to be blind with septo-optic dysplasia, and has additionally been diagnosed with autism and Prader–Willi syndrome. Whilst heavily pregnant with Harvey, Price had a brief relationship with English singer Gareth Gates, who had been a virgin.

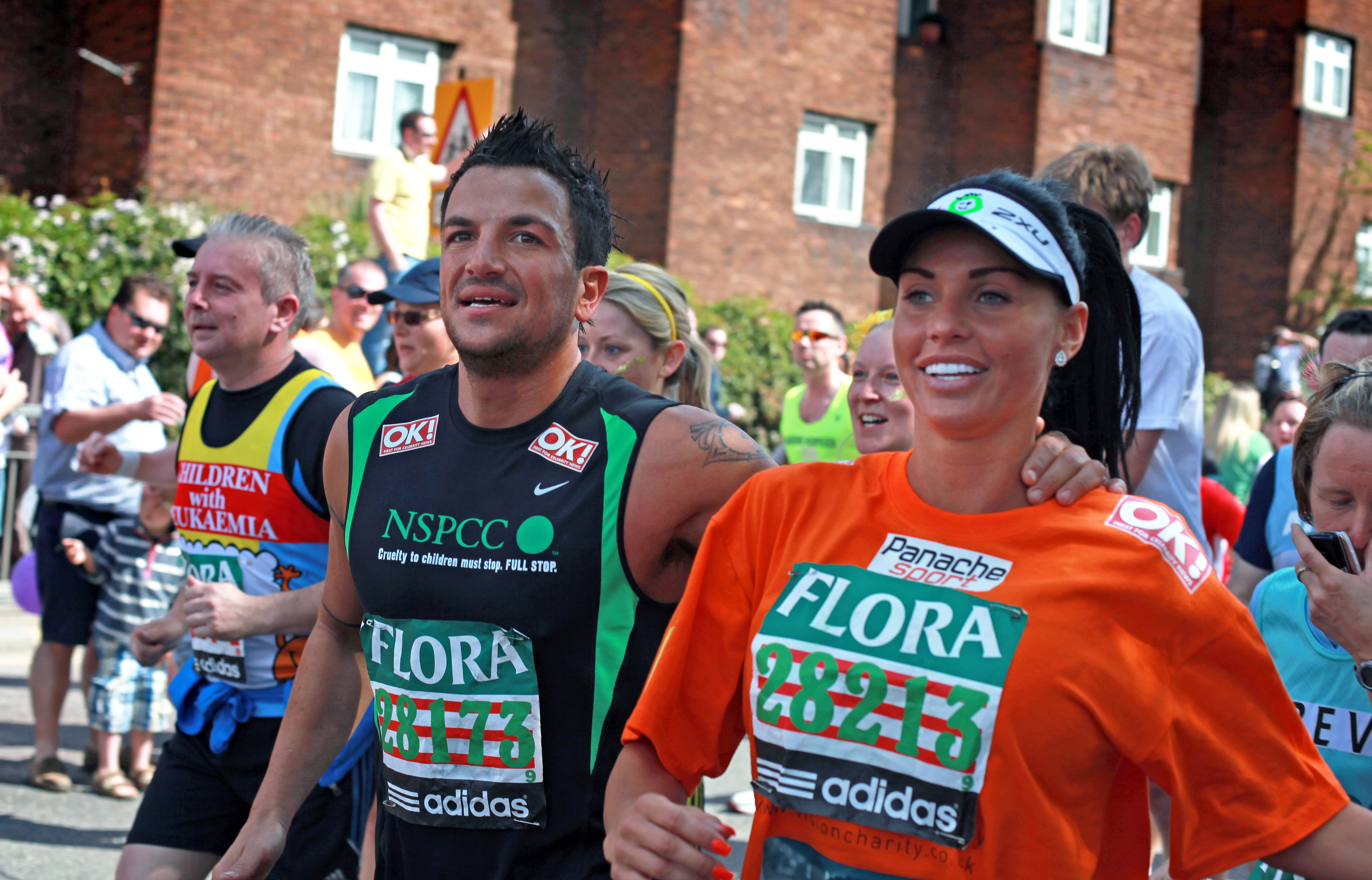
Price with her then-husband Peter Andre in April 2009 participating in the London Marathon

Price and Peter Andre, a British-Australian singer and television personality, began a relationship after appearing on I'm a Celebrity... Get Me Out of Here! and married in September 2005 at Highclere Castle, Hampshire. In June 2005, Price gave birth by Caesarean section to her second son, Junior Savva Andre. In June 2007, she gave birth to her third child, daughter Princess Tiaamii Crystal Andrea. In April 2009, Price suffered a miscarriage 10 weeks into pregnancy. In May 2009, Price and Andre announced that they were separating and divorced in September 2009.

In July 2009, Price began dating MMA fighter and actor Alex Reid. They married on 2 February 2010 in a private ceremony at Wynn Hotel on the Las Vegas Strip. Reid and Price separated in January 2011 and their divorce was finalised in March 2012.

In January 2013, Price married her third husband Kieran Hayler at the Sandals Royal Bahamian Resort and Spa in the Bahamas, after Hayler proposed on Christmas Day 2012. The couple had a wedding blessing in Weston-super-Mare in March 2013. In August 2013, Price gave birth to her third son, Jett Riviera Hayler. On 4 August 2014, she gave birth to a second daughter, Bunny Hayler, two weeks prematurely. In May 2014, Price accused Hayler of having an extramarital affair and announced she was beginning divorce proceedings. They reconciled on the condition that Hayler attend therapy for sex addiction and renewed their wedding vows at Long Furlong Wedding Barn, near Worthing, West Sussex in February 2015. In July 2017, the couple renewed their wedding vows for the second time in the Maldives. In October 2017, in Barbados, Price and Hayler renewed their wedding vows for the third time. In May 2018, Price announced she was starting divorce proceedings over an extramarital affair.

In July 2019, Price announced she was engaged to Kristopher Boyson; the couple split up a month later.

In June 2020, Price began dating car salesman Carl Woods; the two engaged 10 months later in April 2021, making it her eighth engagement. The pair would break up on two separate occasions in 2022 (March and November), due to alleged infidelities claims by Woods, before reuniting in March 2023. They began IVF treatment (as shown in the 2025 Making Babies documentary) in the summer to no avail; they ultimately broke up in December 2023.

Soon after her breakup from Woods, Price began dating Married at First Sight contestant JJ Slater in February 2024. In January 2026, Price confirmed on her podcast that she and Slater were no longer dating.

In January 2026, Price announced she had married her fourth husband, businessman Lee Andrews, in Dubai. The couple exchanged vows a few days after they met for the first time. Price's relationship with Andrews has been subject to speculation, with many questioning whether their marriage was legitimate. In May 2026, it was reported that Andrews was a conman, with journalist Clemmie Moodie alleging that he had scammed her out of £1,000, as well as scamming other women. The same month it was reported Andrews had been reported missing, as well as that he had been arrested. Price said she had "reached a point where she could do little else except wait for updates from authorities and added that she was "not going to talk about it anymore." Andrews subsequently returned to the UK the following month.

=== Cosmetic procedures and health ===
In 2002, Price was treated for a leiomyosarcoma on her finger. The cancerous tumor was removed at a Nuffield Hospital near her Brighton home.

Price first had cosmetic surgery in the early stages of her career, when she underwent breast augmentation at the age of 20, and has had multiple operations since. Though the number has been debated, Price has said that she has had over 24 breast augmentations throughout her life, including a reduction in 2022.

Price underwent her first threading facelift in 2017, after it was offered to her free of charge. She underwent her second facelift in December 2018, which she documented on Instagram and for which she was subsequently criticised. In April 2019, Price began travelling overseas to Turkey to undergo her cosmetic surgeries, first undergoing liposuction, a Brazilian butt lift, and her third facelift, reportedly all within the same day.

In July 2020, Price documented the replacement of her veneers, once again in Turkey, to her YouTube channel. The same month, she confirmed in an Instagram post that she had suffered two broken ankles and feet while at The Land of Legends in Turkey, for which she would need to undergo operations, and was told she would not be able to walk for three to six months. In September, she began receiving treatment at The Priory in London.

In June 2021, Price documented her return to Turkey, undergoing an eye, cheek and lip lift (after she was told she could not undergo a full facelift as she "did not have enough skin"), as well as her second Brazilian butt lift and under-chin and full body liposuction, which resulted in her needing a blood transfusion; all of which she posted to her YouTube channel. In a February 2022 appearance on Lorraine, Price unveiled her recent brow lift, to which host Lorraine Kelly pleaded, "Don't have any more work. You're fine!" Price replied, "You sound like my mother!"

In July 2023, Price underwent rhinoplasty surgery to fix an issue caused by an incision from her previous lip lift that made her nose "wonky." In November, while at her live podcast show, Price revealed to the audience her buttock was actively leaking due to filler she got injected the week prior. In August 2024, Price returned to Turkey and underwent her sixth facelift, which costed her a reported £10,000, as well an additional breast augmentation, before returning in February to fix minor issues from her previous facelift. In August 2025, Price revealed she had undergone another facelift and accidentally pulled out the stitches.

=== Subject to assault ===
In September 2009, Price said that she had previously been raped by a "famous celebrity", although she had not reported the incident. Price said that she would "absolutely never" reveal who the attacker was. Surrey Police stated that they had not contacted Price: "No allegation of rape has been made and Miss Price will not be making a statement to police".

In March 2018, Price was carjacked and robbed while filming in Swaziland. In September 2022, she further reported that she had been raped during the incident. By her own account, she attempted suicide after the incident.

=== Legal proceedings and bankruptcy ===
In August 2003, Price was arrested following an incident in July 2003 for an alleged assault at a nightclub in Birmingham. No further action was taken by the police.

In 2006, Joanne Hillman, a nanny employed by Price, was charged with benefit fraud. Hillman was initially tried in 2007 and Price was subsequently summoned to give evidence. As a result of media reporting, however, the trial collapsed. Hillman was retried in 2008, but no evidence was offered, and she was acquitted.

In August 2018, Price had a bankruptcy hearing at the High Court hearing which was adjourned to give her three months to pay off her debts through an individual voluntary arrangement. In November 2019 Price declared bankruptcy. Her debts were listed as totalling more than £3.5 million. Subsequently, in February 2024 a garnishment order of 40% of her earnings was entered into and in March 2024, Price was found bankrupt for a second time.

In April 2019, Price was sued by her ex-husband Alex Reid for breach of confidence, misuse of private information and breach of contract, after Reid claimed Price had exposed nude photos of him to a live studio audience during a taping of Celebrity Big Brother's Bit on the Side on 9 January the year prior. In March 2020, High Court judge Mark Warby ordered Price to pay Reid £25,000 in damages.

In June 2019 Price was fined after shouting abuse at ex-husband Kieran Hayler's girlfriend, Michelle Penticost, in a school playground, in Shipley, West Sussex. Price was issued with a five-year restraining order, banning her from making any contact with Penticost and ordered to pay £606 in fines and court costs. In January 2022, Price was arrested on suspicion of breaching the order after allegedly sending abusive text messages to both Hayler and Penticost. In May 2022 Price pleaded guilty at Lewes Crown Court to breaching the restraining order. In June, she was given an 18-month community order to complete 170 hours of unpaid work with an additional 20 hours for breach of a suspended driving sentence, and ordered to pay £1,500 in costs.

In June 2019 Horsham District Council began enforcement action against Price for demolition and construction works undertaken at her property. The enforcement action concluded in October 2019 when Price was given 30 days to remove the new construction and restore the demolished structures. In December 2023 it was reported that, between December 2021 and March 2022, Price and her then-fiancé Carl Woods had run a suspected second-hand car dealership from Price's home; Horsham District Council began enforcement action against the couple in September 2022 but closed the case as the second-hand car dealership had already closed in July 2023.

In July 2024 an arrest warrant was issued for Price after she failed to attend a court hearing relating to her bankruptcy. She was arrested on 8 August 2024 at Heathrow Airport upon her return from Turkey. According to the BBC, she seemed to have made 40% of her income from OnlyFans.

On 19 August 2024, a judge suspended her TikTok income pending further bankruptcy hearings.

==== Driving offences ====
In June 2008 Price was convicted of driving while using a mobile phone in April 2008 and received three points on her driving licence.

In September 2010 Price was given three points after being convicted for failing to be in proper control of a vehicle in February 2010. In December 2010 Price was banned from driving for six months for exceeding 12 points on her driving licence after being given an additional three points on her licence for speeding in December 2009.

In April 2012 Price won an appeal against a conviction for two counts of failing to give information regarding a driver's identity regarding speeding tickets issued to her relating to offences in London in 2011. Price argued she had not seen the tickets as she did not open her own post. In July 2015 Price was convicted of failing to stop at a red light at Buck Barn, West Grinstead in West Sussex.

In February 2018 Price was banned from driving for six months. In July 2018 Price reported herself to the police for driving while disqualified. In January 2019, Price faced a three-month ban on driving after breaching the conditions of a previous ban, and the following month, the ban was extended an additional three months due to drink driving. Price had been found by police in the back seat of a vehicle in August 2018 after it had crashed, but charges of being drunk in charge of a vehicle were dropped due to a lack of evidence. In October 2019, Price was convicted of failing to provide details of the incident and was banned from driving for two years (later reduced to 18 months). In September 2021, Price pleaded guilty to driving drunk without insurance and while disqualified. In December, she was given a 16-week suspended sentence, with a condition of unpaid work, and a two-year driving ban. This was for a crash which resulted in the car overturning near Partridge Green, near Horsham.

In July 2022 two motoring charges were dismissed by Crawley Magistrates Court, one of speeding on 13 September 2021, and one of failing to provide information concerning the speeding charge. The charges were dropped when no evidence was presented by the prosecution.

In July 2023 Price was stopped by an unmarked police car in Worthing, West Sussex for driving otherwise than in accordance with a licence and driving without insurance. As a result, the car she was driving, a Range Rover, was seized by police.

In March 2024 Price was convicted of driving without a valid licence and insurance. It was revealed that her licence had been suspended for medical reasons in April 2023 and had subsequently expired. Price was found guilty after she was filmed at a petrol station in Kettering, Northamptonshire, driving her Range Rover onto the forecourt and exiting from the driver's seat. Price was ordered to pay a total of £1,852 in fines and other charges.

In April 2026, Price was banned from driving for a seventh time after failing to respond to police letters about a speeding ticket. She was also ordered to pay a £660 fine, £120 in costs and a £264 victim surcharge.

== Filmography ==
=== Television ===
As herself
Year	Title	Notes
1999	Millennium Calendar Girls	Documentary
1999	So Graham Norton	Guest; 1 episode
2000	The Big Breakfast	Guest; 1 episode
2002	Shooting Stars	Guest Panellist; 1 episode
2002	Top of the Pops 2	Award Presenter; 1 episode
2002–2005	Jordan	3 series
2003	The Club	Bar Guest; 1 episode
2003	The Luvvies	Television special
2003	Dream Team	Episode: "Bending the Truth"
2003	Bo' Selecta!	1 episode
2004	Footballers' Wives	1 episode
2004	Hell's Kitchen	Guest Presenter; 5 episodes
2004	Tabloid Tales	1 episode
2004	Top Gear	"Star in a Reasonably Priced Car"
2004, 2009	I'm a Celebrity...Get Me Out of Here!	Contestant on third and ninth series
2004–2009	Katie & Peter	Documentary series with Peter Andre
2004, 2018	Ant & Dec's Saturday Night Takeaway	Guest Announcer; 2 episodes
2005	The Big Fat Quiz of the Year	Contestant; television special
2005	Making Your Mind Up	Contestant, runner-up
2005	The Friday Night Project	Guest Presenter; 1 episode
2006	Royal Variety Performance	Guest Co-presenter alongside Peter Andre
2007	Balls of Steel	Contestant; 1 episode
2008–2012	Celebrity Juice	Guest Panellist; 5 episodes
2009	Piers Morgan's Life Stories	1 episode
2009–2010	What Katie Did Next	2 series
2009–2020	Katie	9 series
2010	Katie & Alex	Documentary series with Alex Reid
2010	Suck My Pop	Guest: 1 episode
2011	Signed by Katie Price	Presenter and Judge; 1 series
2011	Let's Dance For Comic Relief	Contestant; 2 episodes
2011	Katie Price: Standing Up for Harvey	Documentary
2011	Britain and Ireland's Next Top Model	Special Guest; 1 episode
2011	The Wright Stuff	Guest Panellist; 3 episodes
2012	The Apprentice: You're Fired!	Special Guest; 1 episode
2012	Celebrity Deal or No Deal	Contestant; 1 episode
2013–2017	Big Brother's Bit on the Side	Guest Panellist; 9 episodes
2014	Keep It in the Family	Contestant; 1 episode
2014	Celebrity Catchphrase	Contestant; 1 episode
2015	Safeword	Contestant; 1 episode
2015	Celebrity Big Brother	Contestant and Winner of fifteenth series
2015	All Star Family Fortunes	Contestant; 1 episode
2015	In Therapy	1 episode
2015	Reality Bites	Guest; 2 episodes
2005, 2008–2019, 2021	Loose Women	Guest / Regular Panellist
2016	Off Their Rockers	Guest Prankster; 1 episode
2016	Room 101	Guest; 1 episode
2016	Katie Price's Pony Club	1 series
2016	Who's Doing the Dishes?	Guest; 2 episodes
2017	Tipping Point: Lucky Stars	Contestant; 1 episode
2017	The Crystal Maze	Contestant; 1 episode
2017	Katie Price: My Crazy Life	1 series
2017	Lip Sync Battle UK	Competitor; 1 episode
2017	Celebs Go Dating	1 episode
2018	Team Harvey	Documentary
2018	Celebrity Haunted Hotel Live	5 episodes
2018	Through the Keyhole	1 episode
2020	Celebrity SAS: Who Dares Wins	Contestant; 2 episodes
2020	Page Three: The Naked Truth	Documentary
2020	Celebrity: A 21st-Century Story	Documentary
2021	Katie Price: Harvey and Me	Documentary
2021	Steph's Packed Lunch	Guest; 7 episodes
2021	Celebrity MasterChef	Contestant; 3 episodes
2022	Shameless: The Rise & Fall of Katie Price	Subject; documentary on Channel 5
2022	RuPaul's Drag Race: UK vs. the World	Special Guest; 1 episode (Series 1)
2022	Shopping with Keith Lemon	Guest; 1 episode
2022	Katie Price: What Harvey Did Next	Documentary
2022	Katie Price: Trauma and Me	Documentary series
2022–2023	Katie Price's Mucky Mansion	2 series
2023	Livin' with Lucy	Guest; Series 6, 1 episode
2024	Celeb Cooking School	Contestant; 1 episode
2025	Katie Price: Making Babies	Documentary series
2026	Olivia Attwood: Getting Filthy Rich	Episode: "Celebrity OnlyFans"
2026	Katie Price: Nothing to Hide	Documentary series on Sky
2027 (in filming)	Celebrity Handcuffed^{[needs link]}	Reality show on Channel 4

=== Film ===
Year	Title	Role
2017	Sharknado 5: Global Swarming	Connery
2026	Jackie the Stripper	Lisa

=== DVDs ===
Year	Title	Role	Notes
2005	The Jordan Workout	Herself	Fitness DVD
2010	Katie Price: It's a Jungle Out There	Herself	Documentary

=== Television advertisements ===
Year	Advert	Role	Notes
2003	Kwik Save	Magician Assistant	
2009	Freeview+	Herself	
2015	National Lottery	Various	

== Discography ==
=== Albums ===
List of albums, with selected details, chart positions and certifications
Title	Details	Peak chart positions	Certifications
Title	Details	UK	Certifications
A Whole New World (with Peter Andre)	Released: 27 November 2006; Label: Sony BMG; Formats: CD, download	20	BPI: Gold

=== Singles ===
List of singles, with selected chart positions
Title	Year	Peak chart positions	Album
Title	Year	UK	Album
"A Whole New World"	2006	12	A Whole New World
"Free to Love Again"	2010	60	Non-album singles
"I Got U"	2017	— (Note: "I Got U" did not enter the UK top 100, but peaked at number 2 on the UK Singles Downloads Chart on 05 September 2025.)	Non-album singles
"Hurricane"	2019	— (Note: "Hurricane" did not enter the UK top 100, but peaked at number 19 on the UK Singles Downloads Chart.)	Non-album singles
"Best of Me"	2025	— (Note: "Best of Me" did not enter the UK Singles Top 100, but peaked at number 21 on the UK Singles Sales Chart.)	Non-album singles
"This Christmas"	2025	—	Non-album singles
"—" denotes a recording that did not chart or was not released in that territory.

== Awards and nominations ==
Year	Award	Category	Work	Result	Ref
2004	Loaded Award	Cover Girl of the Decade	Herself	Won	
2005	British Book Awards	The Biography of the Year	Being Jordan	Nominated	
2007	Cosmopolitan Award	Woman of the Year	Herself	Won	
2008	British Book Awards	British Children's Book of the Year	My Pony Care Book	Nominated	
2009	Bounty Award	Celebrity Mum of the Year	Herself	Nominated	
2009	FiFi Awards	Award for Celebrity Fragrance	Besotted	Won	
2011	Virgin Music Media Awards	Loser of the Year	Herself	Won	
2011	Virgin Music Media Awards	Worst Song	"Free to Love Again"	Won	
2011	Virgin Music Media Awards	Worst Use of Auto Tune	"Free to Love Again"	Won	
2012	Foxy Bingo	Celebrity Mum of the Year	Herself	Won	
2013	Pure Beauty Award	Best New Design & Packaging Award	Kissable	Won	
2015	British LGBT Awards	Celebrity Straight Ally	Herself	Nominated	

== Bibliography ==
The first 14 of Price's books were ghostwritten by Rebecca Farnworth.

=== Autobiographies ===
- Being Jordan (2004)
- A Whole New World (2006)
- Pushed to the Limit (2008)
- You Only Live Once (2010)
- Love, Lipstick and Lies (2013)
- Reborn (2016)
- Katie Price: Harvey and Me (2021)
- This Is Me: The High Life. The Dark Times. The Full Story (2024)

=== Novels ===
- Angel (2006)
- Crystal (2007)
- Angel Uncovered (2008)
- Sapphire (2009)
- Paradise (2010)
- The Comeback Girl (2011)
- Santa Baby (2011)
- In the Name of Love (2012)
- He's the One (2013)
- Make my Wish Come True (2014)
- Playing with Fire (2018)
- Winner Takes All (2019)

=== Children's books ===
- Perfect Ponies (2007–2010)
  - Here Comes the Bride, Little Treasures, Fancy Dress Ponies, Pony Club Weekend, The New Best Friend, Ponies to the Rescue, My Pony Care Book, Star Ponies, Pony 'n' Pooch, Pony in Disguise, Stage Fright!, Secrets and Surprises, Wild West Weekend (in order of publication date)
- Mermaids & Pirates (2008–2009)
  - Follow the Fish, I Spy, Let's Build a Sandcastle, A Sunny Day, Telescope Overboard, Time for a Picnic, All Around, Hide and Seek, Katie the Mermaid, Katie's Day, Peter's Friends, Pirate Olympics (in order of publication date)

=== Fashion book ===
- Standing Out (2009)

== Podcasts ==
- The Katie Price Show (2023–present)

== See also ==
- List of glamour models

== Notes ==
Preceded by Gary Busey	Celebrity Big Brother UK winner Series 15 (2015)	Succeeded by James Hill
