= Just Missed the Train =

Compilation album by Danielle Brisebois
- Released: September 26, 2006
- Genre: Rock
- Length: 40:26
- Label: Sony BMG
- Producer: Gregg Alexander

Danielle Brisebois chronology
Arrive All over You (1994)	Just Missed the Train (2006)	Portable Life (2008)

Just Missed the Train is a Danielle Brisebois compilation album released on September 26, 2006. It contains numerous tracks from her 1994 debut Arrive All Over You and the rare B-sides "Sinking Slow", "Pretty Baby", and an acoustic version of "Just Missed the Train".

== Track listing ==
All tracks are written by Danielle Brisebois and Gregg Alexander, except where noted.

No.	Title	Writer(s)	Length
1.	"What If God Fell from the Sky"		2:54
2.	"Crawling"		4:05
3.	"Just Missed the Train"	Brisebois, Scott Cutler	4:59
4.	"Ain't Gonna Cry No More"		4:47
5.	"Don't Wanna Talk About Love"		3:56
6.	"Gimme Little Sign"	Jerry Winn, Alfred Smith, Joseph Hooven	3:02
7.	"Welcome to Love - Now Go Home"	Alexander	3:44
8.	"Sinking Slow"	Brisebois, Alexander, Roger Manning, Andy Sturmer	3:42
9.	"Pretty Baby"		4:01
10.	"Just Missed the Train" (Acoustic Version)	Brisebois, Cutler	5:16
Total length:			40:26
