= I Don't Wanna Talk About Love =

Single by Danielle Brisebois

from the album Arrive All Over You
- B-side: "Pretty Baby"
- Released: 1995
- Genre: Rock, pop
- Length: 3:58
- Label: Epic
- Songwriter(s): Danielle Brisebois; Gregg Alexander
- Producer(s): Gregg Alexander

Danielle Brisebois singles chronology
"Gimme Little Sign" (1994)	"I Don't Wanna Talk About Love" (1995)	"I've Had It" (1999)

"I Don't Wanna Talk About Love" (titled without the "I" on the album) is a song by Danielle Brisebois, the third single off her 1994 album Arrive All Over You.

== Single track listing ==
(all songs written by Danielle Brisebois and Gregg Alexander)

1. "I Don't Wanna Talk About Love" – 3:56
2. "Pretty Baby" – 4:01
3. "Promise Tomorrow Tonight" – 4:40

Gregg Alexander features on track 2 and 3
