= Ultimate High =

Studio album by Carly Smithson
- Released: 13 November 2001
- Recorded: 1999–2001
- Studio: Westlake Audio, BLC, Sol Seven Studios, Ameraycan Studios, Garfield Studios, and Larrabee Studios (Los Angeles, California), Townhouse Studios, Olympic, Soul II Soul and Titan Studios (London, UK), American Recording Co. (Calabasas, California), Front Page Recorders (Glendale, California)
- Genre: Pop
- Length: 52:39
- Label: MCA
- Producer: Gregg Alexander, Danielle Brisebois, Steve Dorff

Singles from Ultimate High
- 1. "I'm Gonna Blow Your Mind" Released: April 2001; 2. "Beautiful You" Released: June 2001

Professional ratings
Review scores
Source	Rating
AllMusic	4/5 stars
Sacramento News and Review	(unfavorable)

Ultimate High is the debut album by Irish-born singer Carly Smithson, released under her maiden name Carly Hennessy in 2001 by MCA Records. Despite a production and promotion budget of over $2 million and good reviews, the album failed to find an audience, selling only 378 copies in its first three months. It became a textbook example of the high-risk economics of the contemporary music industry, in which less than 5% of albums became profitable, and superstar acts subsidized the search for new talent.

The song "Just Missed the Train" was later covered by American Idol season 1 winner Kelly Clarkson in her debut album Thankful. Oddly enough, Hennessy later auditioned for American Idol season 7 under her husband's last name Smithson, finishing in 6th place.

Two singles were released off the album: "I'm Gonna Blow Your Mind" and "Beautiful You".

== Overview ==
Carly Hennessy signed with MCA Records in June 1999 and recorded eight songs for her debut album with producer Steve Dorff, with whom she had already recorded the demo that got her the attention of MCA president Jay Boberg in the first place. However, both Hennessy and MCA were dissatisfied with the songs, finding they sounded too much like Barbra Streisand for the album's target teen audience. Thus, MCA hired producer Gregg Alexander in early 2000, who had been the lead singer of the New Radicals and since written and produced several hit singles in Europe for, among others, Ronan Keating. Alexander produced four songs for the album, which he had co-written with former child actress Danielle Brisebois, with whom he had also previously worked on several other projects, including Brisebois' two solo albums. Brisebois, who had never worked as a producer before, also produced several more tracks for the album, including two songs originally set to appear on her unreleased second album Portable Life.

In April 2001, while the album was still in production, MCA released Hennessy's first single, "I'm Gonna Blow Your Mind", which got very little radio airplay as it was considered too mature for regular Top 40 radio and youth-oriented outlets and as too pop-sounding for adult top 40 radio.

In spring 2001, The Police and Sting manager Miles Copeland III was hired as a co-manager (Hennessy was managed by her father before) and exerted pressure to finish the recording of the album. A second single, "Beautiful You", was released to promote the album, but it gained even less airplay than the first and when the album was finally released in November 2001, retailers ordered very few copies, as the two singles had not sold well.

Despite low album sales, Carly Hennessy later won a Meteor Award in 2003 for Best Irish Female Singer.

== Track listing ==
1. "Beautiful You" (Robb Boldt, Danielle Brisebois, Carly Hennessy) – 4:42
2. "I'm Gonna Blow Your Mind" (Gregg Alexander) – 4:19
3. "Surface Wound" (Alexander) – 3:54
4. "You'll Never Meet God (If You Break My Heart)" (Alexander, Brisebois, Nick Lashley) – 4:36
5. "No One's Safe From Goodbye" (Alexander, Brisebois, Hennessy) – 4:32
6. "Young Love" - (Alexander, David Munday, Sandy Stewart) – 4:12
7. "I Need A Little Love" (Alexander, Brisebois) – 4:07
8. "Get You Off" (Boldt, Brisebois, Hennessy) – 4:16
9. "Rip In Heaven" (Brisebois) – 3:29
10. "All Kinds Of People" (Sheryl Crow, Kevin Gilbert, Eric Pressly) – 4:18
11. "Just Missed The Train" (Brisebois, Scott Cutler) – 5:22
12. "What I've Found" (Alexander, Brisebois, Hennessy, Lashley) – 4:45

== Credits ==
- Larry Aberman – drums
- Gregg Alexander – guitar
- Rusty Anderson – guitar, electric guitar
- Ron Aston – drums
- Matt Austin – piano, keyboards
- Danielle Brisebois – background vocals, piano, keyboards, percussion, "trumpet", acoustic guitar
- Marie Brisebois – background vocals
- Lenny Castro – percussion
- Brad Cole – keyboards
- Chuck E. – piano, keyboards
- Sheila E. – percussion
- Moe "The Man" El-Khamlichi – Spoken intro of "Young Love"
- Paul Gordon – electric guitar, piano, keyboards, B3, organ
- James Halliwell – piano, keyboards
- Carly Hennessy – vocals, background vocals
- Nick Lashley – electric guitar, acoustic guitar, background vocals
- Matt Laug – drums
- John Mabarack – piano, keyboards
- Lance Morrison – bass
- Andy Nehra – bass
- Ron Pengbom – drums
- John Pierce – bass
- Leland Sklar – bass
- Tom Sloape – piano, keyboards
- Rose Stone – background vocals
- Michael Thompson – guitar
