= To the Top =

To the Top may refer to:

- "Southern Mississippi to the Top", the official fight song of the University of Southern Mississippi
- "To the Top" (Peter Andre song), 1994
- "To the Top" (Psychic Fever song), 2023
- "To the Top", a song by Krokus from One Vice at a Time
- "To the Top", a song by Twin Shadow from his album Eclipse
- To the Top (TV series), a reality Philippine show on GMA Network
