= Battle of the Network Stars =

American TV series

- Presented by: Howard Cosell; Tony Potts; Mike Greenberg; Joe Tessitore
- Country of origin: United States
- Original language: English
- No. of seasons: 12 (1976–88); 1 (2017)
- No. of episodes: 19 (1976–88); 10 (2017)

Production
- Executive producers: Andrew Glassman (2017); Chris Carlson (2017); Michael Antinoro (2017); Will Staeger (2017)
- Running time: 120 minutes (1976–2003); 60 minutes (2017)
- Production companies: Trans World International (1976–88); ABC Sports (1976–88); Glassman Media (2017); IMG Media (2017)

Original release
- Network: ABC
- Release: November 13, 1976 – December 10, 1988
- Release: June 29 – September 7, 2017

Battle of the Network Stars is a series of special competitions in which television stars from ABC, CBS and NBC would compete in various sporting events. A total of 19 of these competitions were held between 1976 and 1988, all of which were aired by ABC.

In 2003, NBC attempted to revive Battle of the Network Stars with a two-hour special in primetime. The special aired on August 16, 2003.

In 2005, Bravo premiered a revised short-lived spinoff version of the show called Battle of the Network Reality Stars featuring 33 competitors from several different reality shows competing for cash and prizes running from August 17 to September 21, 2005. Also in the same year, ESPN premiered a sports-themed spinoff version of Battle of the Network Stars as Battle of the Gridiron Stars featuring twenty players from the AFC and NFC competing in a variety of tasks that had nothing to do with football. Unlike its other spinoffs, this version ran for two seasons from April 12, 2005 to May 17, 2006.

In 2017, ABC revived the series as a summer series, which ran from June 29 to September 7, 2017.

In 2026, The Roku Channel did an online-themed spinoff version of Battle of the Network Stars as Battle of the Streaming Starswhere it moved the rivalry from traditional broadcasting networks to the landscape of modern streaming platforms by gathering an eccentric roster of comedians, actors, reality TV icons and digital creators to trade their couches for the playing field. It made its debut on October 23, 2026.

== Broadcast history ==
The first Battle was broadcast on ABC starting in November 1976. The program proved popular and continued for an additional eight and a half years, with subsequent episodes airing approximately every six months until May 1985. One final competition aired in December 1988. NBC tried to revive the competition in August 2003 with Tony Potts as host, but with an intra-network contest consisting of personalities from the NBC family of networks. Typically, episodes were aired twice per calendar year, once during the spring and once during the fall during Nielsen Ratings sweeps weeks.

Sports broadcaster Howard Cosell hosted or co-hosted all but one of the first nineteen competitions (he did not host the 1985 edition due to a falling-out with ABC, but he returned for the final edition in 1988), and commented on the action with a semi-serious version of the style for which he was famous.

When ABC revived the program as a weekly series in 2017, Mike Greenberg and Joe Tessitore took over the hosting duties. Furthermore, each episode began with a remake of the opening sequence of ABC's Wide World of Sports.

== Format ==
=== 1976–1988 ===
All but one of the competitions took place at the sports facilities of Pepperdine University located overlooking Malibu, California. The only exception was the 18th (XVIII) which was held in Ixtapa, Mexico.

Each network was represented by eight or ten of its stars from various series, and one of those people from each team would be elected to serve as the network's team captain.

Some of the events were modeled after those used on Superstars, another Trans World-ABC production that featured athletes from all sports competing against each other for an overall title. Regular events included swimming, kayaking, volleyball, golf, tennis, bowling (on custom-made outdoor lanes), cycling, 3-on-3 football, the baseball dunk, running, and the obstacle course. Also featured as a regular event was a game of "Simon Says", directed by Catskill hotel Grossinger's entertainer Lou Goldstein. Each network received points based on how it performed in the event.

After the regular events were over, the lowest scoring network was eliminated from further competition and the two remaining networks determined the day's winner with the final event, the Tug of War.

=== 2017 ===
Two teams of five celebrities competed each week with a professional athlete as their coach The coaches returned throughout the season. The teams were typically assigned based on the genre or role of the celebrities' notable TV credits. For example, one episode pitted prime-time soap opera stars against actors associated with comedies, while another had actors who played lawyers vs. those who played White House employees. Teams often included at least one veteran actor or actress who had previously competed in the original Battle of the Network Stars and archive footage of their previous appearance(s) was shown. The venue remained Pepperdine University, as it was in the original.

== Episodes ==
=== Battle of the Network Stars I (Nov. 13, 1976) ===
Host	ABC (winner)	CBS	NBC
Howard Cosell	Gabe Kaplan (captain); Darleen Carr; Lynda Carter; Farrah Fawcett-Majors; Richard Hatch; Robert Hegyes; Ron Howard; Hal Linden; Penny Marshall; John Schuck	Telly Savalas (captain); Adrienne Barbeau; Gary Burghoff; Kevin Dobson; Pat Harrington, Jr. Bill Macy; Lee Meriwether; Mackenzie Phillips; Loretta Swit; Jimmie Walker	Robert Conrad (captain); Melissa Sue Anderson; Karen Grassle; Tim Matheson; Ben Murphy; Barbara Parkins; Joanna Pettet; Kevin Tighe; Bobby Troup; Demond Wilson

=== Battle of the Network Stars II (Feb. 28, 1977) ===
This edition aired under the title Challenge of the Network Stars.

Hosts	ABC	CBS	NBC (winner)
Howard Cosell; Bruce Jenner; O. J. Simpson	Gabe Kaplan (captain); LeVar Burton; Darleen Carr; Richard Hatch; Lawrence Hilton-Jacobs; Ron Howard; Hal Linden; Kristy McNichol; Penny Marshall; Jaclyn Smith	Telly Savalas (captain); Sonny Bono; Kevin Dobson; Mike Farrell; David Groh; Linda Lavin; Lee Meriwether; Rob Reiner; Loretta Swit; Marcia Wallace	Robert Conrad (captain); Elizabeth Allen; Lynda Day George; Carl Franklin; Karen Grassle; Dan Haggerty; Art Hindle; Kurt Russell; Jane Seymour; W. K. Stratton

=== Battle of the Network Stars III (Nov. 4, 1977) ===
Hosts	ABC (winner)	CBS	NBC
Howard Cosell; Telly Savalas; Bruce Jenner	Gabe Kaplan (captain); Fred Berry; Billy Crystal; Chris DeRose; Victor French; Cheryl Ladd; Kristy McNichol; Penny Marshall; Suzanne Somers; Parker Stevenson	Jimmie Walker (captain); Adrienne Barbeau; Valerie Bertinelli; Kevin Dobson; Jamie Farr; Caren Kaye; James MacArthur; Jimmy McNichol; Loretta Swit; Lyle Waggoner	Dan Haggerty (captain); Robert Conrad; Elinor Donahue; Patrick Duffy; Peter Isacksen; Lance Kerwin; Donna Mills; Belinda Montgomery; Michelle Phillips; Larry Wilcox

=== Battle of the Network Stars IV (May 7, 1978) ===
Hosts	ABC	CBS (winner)	NBC
Howard Cosell; Bruce Jenner; Suzanne Somers	Gabe Kaplan (captain); Debby Boone; Daryl Dragon; Kene Holliday; Steve Landesberg; Parker Stevenson; Toni Tennille; Cheryl Tiegs	Tony Randall (captain); Kevin Dobson; James MacArthur; Denise Nicholas; Mackenzie Phillips; Victoria Principal; Bo Svenson; Jimmie Walker	Richard Benjamin (captain); Rhonda Bates; Jane Curtin; Dennis Dugan; Melissa Gilbert; Arte Johnson; Lance Kerwin; Larry Wilcox

=== Battle of the Network Stars V (Nov. 18, 1978) ===
Hosts	ABC	CBS	NBC (winner)
Howard Cosell; Frank Gifford	Gabe Kaplan (captain); Debby Boone; Billy Crystal; Joyce DeWitt; Richard Hatch; Maren Jensen; Robert Urich; Robin Williams	McLean Stevenson (captain); Valerie Bertinelli; LeVar Burton; Lou Ferrigno; Pat Klous; David Letterman; Tim Reid; Charlene Tilton	Robert Conrad (captain); Joseph Bottoms; William Devane; Pamela Hensley; Brianne Leary; Wendy Rastatter; William Shatner; Caskey Swaim

=== Battle of the Network Stars VI (May 7, 1979) ===
Host	ABC	CBS (winner)	NBC
Howard Cosell	Dick Van Patten (captain); Scott Baio; Billy Crystal; Richard Hatch; Donna Pescow; Susan Richardson; Toni Tennille; Robert Urich	Jamie Farr (captain); Catherine Bach; Valerie Bertinelli; Patrick Duffy; Lou Ferrigno; Leif Garrett; Victoria Principal; Gary Sandy	Robert Conrad (captain); Todd Bridges; Mary Crosby; Jane Curtin; William Devane; Greg Evigan; Brianne Leary; Larry Wilcox

=== Battle of the Network Stars VII (Nov. 2, 1979) ===
Hosts	ABC	CBS	NBC (winner)
Howard Cosell; Billy Crystal	Dick Van Patten (captain); Willie Aames; Diana Canova; Joanna Cassidy; Robert Hays; Max Gail; Kristy McNichol; Shelley Smith	Ed Asner (captain); Valerie Bertinelli; Gregory Harrison; Howard Hesseman; Kathryn Leigh Scott; Judy Norton Taylor; Jan Smithers; Allen Williams	Robert Conrad (captain); Greg Evigan; Gil Gerard; Melissa Gilbert; Erin Gray; Randi Oakes; Sarah Purcell; Patrick Wayne

=== Battle of the Network Stars VIII (May 4, 1980) ===
Hosts	ABC (winner)	CBS	NBC
Howard Cosell; Joyce DeWitt; Lynn Swann	Cathy Lee Crosby (captain); Scott Baio; Robyn Douglass; Grant Goodeve; Robert Hays; Kent McCord; Caroline McWilliams; Joan Prather	Chad Everett (captain); Jonelle Allen; Catherine Bach; Gregory Harrison; Sherman Hemsley; Gary Sandy; Charlene Tilton; Joan Van Ark	William Devane (captain); Gil Gerard; Karen Grassle; Pamela Hensley; Brian Kerwin; Randi Oakes; Sarah Purcell; Larry Wilcox

=== Battle of the Network Stars IX (Dec. 5, 1980) ===
Hosts	ABC	CBS (winner)	NBC
Howard Cosell; Cathy Lee Crosby	John Davidson (captain); Willie Aames; Scott Baio; Phyllis Davis; Donna Dixon; Max Gail; Ann Jillian; Susan Richardson	Jamie Farr (captain); Gregory Harrison; Diane Ladd; Donna Mills; Judy Norton Taylor; Tom Selleck; Joan Van Ark; Robert Walden	Arte Johnson (captain); Byron Allen; John Beck; Greg Evigan; Erin Gray; Judy Landers; Sarah Purcell; Cristina Raines

=== Battle of the Network Stars X (May 8, 1981) ===
Hosts	ABC	CBS (winner)	NBC
Howard Cosell; Erin Gray	Robert Urich (captain); Scott Baio; Melanie Chartoff; Jeff Conaway; Linda Evans; Jenilee Harrison; Bo Hopkins; Ann Jillian	Tom Selleck (captain); Danielle Brisebois; Gregory Harrison; Michele Lee; Leigh McCloskey; Judy Norton Taylor; Tim Reid; Charlene Tilton	Barbara Mandrell (captain); Woody Brown; Melissa Gilbert; Brian Kerwin; Louise Mandrell; Randi Oakes; Skip Stephenson; Michael Warren

=== Battle of the Network Stars XI (Nov. 20, 1981) ===
Hosts	ABC	CBS	NBC (winner)
Howard Cosell; Lee Majors	Scott Baio (captain); Douglas Barr; Cathy Lee Crosby; Donna Dixon; Telma Hopkins; Ann Jillian; Sam J. Jones; Andrew Stevens	Pernell Roberts (captain); Mimi Kennedy; Lorenzo Lamas; Jared Martin; Donna Mills; Tim Reid; Charlene Tilton; Berlinda Tolbert	Gabe Kaplan (captain); Maud Adams; Melissa Gilbert; Mark Harmon; Randi Oakes; Cristina Raines; James B. Sikking; Fred Willard

=== Battle of the Network Stars XII (May 5, 1982) ===
Hosts	ABC	CBS (winner)	NBC
Howard Cosell; Randi Oakes	William Shatner (captain); Douglas Barr; Joan Collins; Lydia Cornell; John Davidson; Telma Hopkins; John James; Heather Thomas	Pernell Roberts (captain); Catherine Bach; Danielle Brisebois; Audrey Landers; Brian Stokes Mitchell; Joan Van Ark; Robert Walden; Tom Wopat	Daniel J. Travanti (captain); Debbie Allen; Mark Harmon; Nancy McKeon; Joe Piscopo; Cristina Raines; Lynn Redgrave; Bruce Weitz

=== Battle of the Network Stars XIII (Oct. 1, 1982) ===
Hosts	ABC (winner)	CBS	NBC
Howard Cosell; Debbie Allen	William Shatner (captain); Stephen Collins; Helen Hunt; John James; Heather Locklear; Kathy Maisnik; Heather Thomas; Demond Wilson	Kevin Dobson (captain); Bruce Boxleitner; Delta Burke; Byron Cherry; Christopher Norris; Jameson Parker; Penny Peyser; Joan Van Ark	Daniel J. Travanti (captain); Dean Butler; Tina Gayle; Melissa Gilbert; Ricky Schroder; Leigh Taylor-Young; Betty Thomas; Michael Warren

=== Battle of the Network Stars XIV (May 4, 1983) ===
Hosts	ABC (winner)	CBS	NBC
Howard Cosell; Morgan Fairchild	John James (captain); Scott Baio; Rachel Dennison; Lisa Eilbacher; Heather Locklear; Randi Oakes; Geoffrey Scott; Adrian Zmed	Tom Wopat (captain); John Beck; Danielle Brisebois; Audrey Landers; Denise Miller; William R. Moses; Tracy Nelson; Ted Shackelford	Bruce Weitz (captain); Peter Barton; David Birney; Meredith Baxter-Birney; Nancy McKeon; Cynthia Sikes; Mr. T Betty Thomas

=== Battle of the Network Stars XV (Nov. 3, 1983) ===
Hosts	ABC (winner)	CBS	NBC
Howard Cosell; Robert Conrad; Donna Mills	William Shatner (captain); Shari Belafonte; Daniel Hugh Kelly; Heather Locklear; Ben Murphy; Geoffrey Scott; Heather Thomas; Jill Whelan	William Devane (captain); Ana Alicia; Rosalind Chao; Charles Frank; William R. Moses; Martha Smith; Andrew Stevens; Joan Van Ark	Mr. T (captain); Edward Albert; Teri Copley; Melinda Culea; Chad Everett; Charles Haid; Vicki Lawrence; Cynthia Sikes

=== Battle of the Network Stars XVI (May 3, 1984) ===
Hosts	ABC	CBS (winner)	NBC
Howard Cosell; Scott Baio; Debby Boone	John James (captain); Shari Belafonte; Pamela Bellwood; James Darren; C. Thomas Howell; Ted Lange; Heather Locklear; Shawn Weatherly	William Devane (captain); Richard Dean Anderson; Abby Dalton; Sarah Douglas; William R. Moses; Douglas Sheehan; Charlene Tilton; Celia Weston	Flip Wilson (captain); Ellen Bry; Kim Fields; Michael J. Fox; Charles Haid; Mark Harmon; Vicki Lawrence; Lisa Whelchel

=== Battle of the Network Stars XVII (Dec. 20, 1984) ===
Hosts	ABC	CBS	NBC (winner)
Howard Cosell; Shari Belafonte	William Shatner (captain); Douglas Barr; Mary Cadorette; Tony Danza; Tony Lo Bianco; Heather Locklear; Tracy Scoggins; Brenda Vaccaro	William Devane (captain); Constance McCashin; Jennifer O'Neill; Tim Reid; Douglas Sheehan; Deborah Shelton; Parker Stevenson; Charlene Tilton	Mark Harmon (captain); Jane Badler; Teri Copley; Kim Fields; Michael J. Fox; Stepfanie Kramer; James B. Sikking; Marc Singer

=== Battle of the Network Stars XVIII (May 23, 1985) ===
Hosts	ABC	CBS	NBC (winner)
Joan Van Ark; Dick Van Dyke	Tony Danza (captain); Deborah Adair; Mary Cadorette; Jack Coleman; Pat Klous; Ted McGinley; Emma Samms; Michael Spound	Lorenzo Lamas (captain); Lucie Arnaz; Mary Frann; Jenilee Harrison; Doug McKeon; William R. Moses; Jennifer O'Neill; Dack Rambo	Bubba Smith (captain); Lisa Bonet; Erin Gray; Kiel Martin; Nancy McKeon; Patricia McPherson; Ken Olin; Philip Michael Thomas

=== Battle of the Network Stars XIX (Dec. 10, 1988) ===
Hosts	ABC Team (Winner)	CBS Team	NBC Team
Howard Cosell; Shari Belafonte	John Davidson (captain); Rebeca Arthur; Allyce Beasley; Olivia d'Abo; Brian Robbins; Rob Stone; JoAnn Willette; Brian Wimmer	Lorenzo Lamas (captain); Kristian Alfonso; Steve Kanaly; Daphne Reid; William Sanderson; Jack Scalia; Nicollette Sheridan; Charlene Tilton	Greg Evigan (captain); Teri Copley; Clifton Davis; Deidre Hall; Dawnn Lewis; Blair Underwood; Malcolm-Jamal Warner; Tina Yothers

Total overall wins – ABC: 7, CBS: 6, NBC: 6

=== Battle of the Network Stars (2017) ===
For this edition, rather than the standard network vs. network format, fielding of the teams was based on the TV characters attributed to each celebrity—cops vs. TV sitcoms, White House staffers vs. lawyers, TV moms & dads vs. TV kids, etc.

Hosts	Sideline Reporters	Blue Team DeMarcus Ware (captain)	Red Team Ronda Rousey (captain)	Air date	Prod. code	U.S. viewers (millions)
Mike Greenberg and Joe Tessitore	Cari Champion and Cassidy Hubbarth	TV Sitcoms (1) (19) (Winner); Tom Arnold; Dave Coulier; Tracey Gold; AJ Michalka; Bronson Pinchot	TV Kids (1) (12); Corbin Bleu; Kim Fields; Nolan Gould; Joey Lawrence; Lisa Whelchel	June 29, 2017	101	4.141
Mike Greenberg and Joe Tessitore	Cari Champion and Cassidy Hubbarth	Variety (1) (10); Joanna Krupa; Nick Lachey; Vanessa Lachey; Gilles Marini; Jack Osbourne	TV Sex Symbols (21) (Winner); Keegan Allen; Traci Bingham; Rosa Blasi; Brant Daugherty; Galen Gering	July 6, 2017	103	3.059
Mike Greenberg and Joe Tessitore	Cari Champion and Cassidy Hubbarth	White House (16) (Winner); LaMonica Garrett; Joshua Malina; Marlee Matlin; Mary McCormack; Cornelius Smith Jr.	Lawyers (13); Catherine Bell; Corbin Bernsen; Romi Dias; Matt McGorry; Elisabeth Röhm	July 13, 2017	105	2.707
Mike Greenberg and Joe Tessitore	Cari Champion and Cassidy Hubbarth	Primetime Soaps (11); Mischa Barton; Gabrielle Carteris; Josh Henderson; Donna Mills; Ian Ziering	ABC Stars (1) (19) (Winner); Shari Belafonte; Olivia d'Abo; Michael Fishman; Jason Hervey; Anson Williams	July 20, 2017	102	2.587
Mike Greenberg and Joe Tessitore	Cari Champion and Cassidy Hubbarth	Cops (1) (19) (Winner); Erik Estrada; Kelly Hu; Lorenzo Lamas; Jodi Lyn O'Keefe; Larry Wilcox	TV Sitcoms (2) (11); Leigh-Allyn Baker; Todd Bridges; Dave Foley; Willie Garson; Jenna von Oy	July 27, 2017	104	2.573
Mike Greenberg and Joe Tessitore	Cari Champion and Cassidy Hubbarth	TV Moms & Dads (19) (Winner); Greg Evigan; Lesley Fera; Jackee Harry; Chad Lowe; Ted McGinley	TV Kids (2) (12); Jonathan Lipnicki; Jeremy Miller; Mackenzie Phillips; Jimmie Walker; Krista Marie Yu	August 3, 2017	106	2.531
Mike Greenberg and Joe Tessitore	Cari Champion and Cassidy Hubbarth	Cops (2) (8); Fred Dryer; Roma Maffia; Marisol Nichols; Ryan Paevey; Adrian Zmed	Sci-Fi Fantasy (21) (Winner); Charisma Carpenter; Lou Ferrigno; Vinnie Jones; Kevin Sorbo; Jill Wagner	August 17, 2017	110	2.319
Mike Greenberg and Joe Tessitore	Cari Champion and Cassidy Hubbarth	ABC Stars (2) (8); Joely Fisher; Troy Gentile; Ted Lange; Denise Richards; Jill Whelan	Variety (2) (21) (Winner); Adrienne Bailon; Lance Bass; Joey Fatone; Cameron Mathison; Kelly Osbourne	August 24, 2017	109	2.053
Mike Greenberg and Joe Tessitore	Cari Champion and Cassidy Hubbarth	Famous TV Families (3); Willie Aames; Danny Bonaduce; Beverley Mitchell; Charlene Tilton; Barry Williams	Doctors (32) (Winner); Thomas Calabro; Taye Diggs; Deidre Hall; Benjamin Hollingsworth; Rachelle Lefevre	September 7, 2017	107	2.979
Mike Greenberg and Joe Tessitore	Cari Champion and Cassidy Hubbarth	Troublemakers (20) (Winner); Catherine Bach; John Barrowman; Julie Benz; Vivica A. Fox; Paul Johansson	TV Lifeguards (11); David Chokachi; Nicole Eggert; Gena Lee Nolin; Brande Roderick; Parker Stevenson	September 7, 2017	108	2.470

== See also ==
- Battle of the Network Reality Stars
- Circus of the Stars
- Disney Channel Games
- Laff-A-Lympics
- Star Games
- Second City Television which featured a parody, "Battle of the PBS Stars".
- Superstars
