= Arrive All over You =

Arrive All Over You

Studio album by Danielle Brisebois
- Released: May 10, 1994
- Genre: Rock
- Length: 45:38
- Label: Epic
- Producer: Gregg Alexander

Danielle Brisebois chronology
Arrive All Over You (1994)	Just Missed the Train (2006)

Professional ratings
Review scores
Source	Rating
Allmusic	3/5 stars

Arrive All Over You is the debut album by American singer-songwriter Danielle Brisebois, released on May 10, 1994, by Epic Records. It includes the singles "What If God Fell from the Sky", "Gimme Little Sign" and "I Don't Wanna Talk About Love". It was co-written and produced by Gregg Alexander, who also sang co-lead on "Promise Tomorrow Tonight". Brisebois and Alexander would later become the nucleus of the short-lived rock group New Radicals, which formed three years after the release of the album.

"Just Missed the Train", which also appears on Brisebois' second album Portable Life (albeit in a different version), has been covered by several artists, including Ringo Sheena, Trine Rein, Maarja, Kelly Clarkson and Carly Hennessy.

Brisebois cited her influences for this album as David Bowie, The Cure, Prefab Sprout, Blondie, The Beatles and in particular John Lennon. She opted for low-key promotion of the album, saying she would "rather have people discover it and like it on their own rather than pushing... I don't want to use any gimmicks to make my music career a success."

== Track listing ==
All tracks are written by Danielle Brisebois and Gregg Alexander, except where noted.

No.	Title	Writer(s)	Length
1.	"What If God Fell from the Sky"		2:54
2.	"Crawling"		4:05
3.	"Ain't Gonna Cry No More"		4:47
4.	"Don't Wanna Talk About Love"		3:58
5.	"Just Missed the Train"	Brisebois, Scott Cutler	5:01
6.	"Gimme Little Sign"	Jerry Winn, Alfred Smith, Joseph Hooven	3:04
7.	"Promise Tomorrow Tonight" (duet with Gregg Alexander)		4:40
8.	"Middla My Heart"		3:57
9.	"Maybe Love Will Change Your Mind"		5:03
10.	"Did I Lead You On"		4:25
11.	"Welcome to Love - Now Go Home"	Alexander	3:44
Total length:			45:38

== Credits ==
- Danielle Brisebois – vocals, piano, acoustic guitar,
- Gregg Alexander – background vocals, co-lead on "Promise Tomorrow Tonight", acoustic guitar, electric guitar, tambourine
- Matt Laug – drums, percussion
- Pat Mastelotto – percussion
- Rusty Anderson – acoustic guitar, electric guitar
- John Pierce – bass guitar
- Merv Depeyer – keyboard
- Scott Plunkett – keyboard
- Mitch Kaplan – keyboard
- Kim Bullard – keyboard
- Claude Gaudette – accompanied Danielle on "Just Missed the Train"
- Bruce Horowitz – clapping
- Jeff Q – clapping
