= The Premonition (1976 film) =

1976 film by Robert Allen Schnitzer

- Theatrical release poster
- Directed by: Robert Schnitzer
- Written by: Anthony Mahon; Robert Schnitzer
- Produced by: Robert Schnitzer
- Starring: Sharon Farrell; Edward Bell; Danielle Brisebois; Richard Lynch
- Cinematography: Victor Milt
- Edited by: Sidney Katz
- Music by: Henry Mollicone; Pril Smiley
- Production company: Movicorp Media
- Distributed by: Avco Embassy Pictures
- Release date: May 5, 1976 (U.S.)
- Running time: 94 minutes
- Country: United States
- Language: English
- Budget: $850,000

The Premonition is a 1976 American psychological horror film produced and directed by Robert Allen Schnitzer, and starring Richard Lynch, Sharon Farrell, Danielle Brisebois, and Jeff Corey. Its plot follows a foster mother who enlists the help of a parapsychologist after her foster daughter is stalked by her mentally-unhinged biological mother and her circus clown boyfriend.

== Plot ==
Andrea Fletcher, a clinically insane woman who was once an esteemed pianist, locates her biological daughter, Janie, who has been raised by foster parents due to Andrea's inability to care for her. Andrea's obsessive boyfriend, Jude, who works as a circus clown, aids her in her search. Upon finding that Janie is being raised nearby, she begins stalking her, and approaches her outside her school. Janie, now five years old, has been raised by Sheri Bennett and her husband Miles, an astrophysics professor. Sheri notices Andrea at the school, and is bothered by the incident.

One night, Andrea breaks into the Bennetts' home and Sheri finds her cradling Janie in her bedroom, clad in a red dress. Sheri and Andrea get into a physical fight before Andrea flees, bringing only Janie's doll with her. Sheri summons the police, and is terribly shaken by the event. Andrea and Jude return to their apartment where they live in squalor, and Andrea has a nervous breakdown. She and Jude get into a fight, ending in Jude stabbing her to death.

Meanwhile, Sheri begins having psychic visions that appear to be premonitions. Miles consults his peer, Jeena Kingsly, a doctor studying parapsychology, and with whom he is having an affair. Det. Lt. Mark Denver begins searching for Andrea, and visits her father to get additional information on her whereabouts. While home alone, Sheri has a disturbing vision of an eviscerated Andrea laughing in Janie's bed, and subsequently receives taunting phone calls from Andrea. Unaware that Andrea is in fact dead, Sheri believes instead that Andrea is a witch who has placed a curse on her.

During a rainstorm one night, Sheri departs with Janie to meet with Miles and Jeena at the university, but her car begins to act of its own accord, causing her to crash. Sheri is taken to the hospital, but Janie is not found at the scene of the accident. Janie wanders toward the carnival where Jude works, having visited it several times before. She is taken in by Jude, who conceals her from police. Meanwhile, after Sheri is released from the hospital, she has an overwhelming feeling that draws her to a rural lake. In an abandoned farmhouse on the shore, they find Janie's doll. Police subsequently drag the lake, recovering Andrea's body. At the carnival, Lenore, a fortune teller, attempts to call police and report they have found Janie, but Jude murders her before she can. Sheri begins to sense that Janie is running out of time.

With the police's prime suspect, Andrea, now dead, Jeena suggests that Sheri attempt to appeal to Andrea's spirit. With Andrea's love of music in mind, Jeena has Sheri perform one of Andrea's pieces in the town square. Meanwhile, Jude is attempting to flee town, with Janie asleep in the back of his RV. He arrives in a traffic jam near the town square where Sheri is performing Andrea's piece, which he recognizes. Miles sees a painting of a horse in the back of the truck, which mirrors a painting from one of Sheri's visions. Miles breaks into the RV, but cannot find Janie. As Sheri's performance reaches its crescendo, Janie appears, walking through the crowd and toward her mother before collapsing from exhaustion.

== Cast ==
- Sharon Farrell as Sheri Bennett
- Edward Bell as Professor Miles Bennett
- Danielle Brisebois as Janie Bennett
- Ellen Barber as Andrea Fletcher
- Richard Lynch as Jude
- Chitra Neogy as Dr. Jeena Kingsly
- Jeff Corey as Lieutenant Mark Denver
- Margaret Graham as Andrea's Landlady
- Rosemary McNamara as Lenore
- Thomas Williams as Todd Fletcher
- Roy White as Dr. Larabee
- Robert Harper as Carnival Watchman

== Production ==
The film was shot in Mississippi.

== Release ==
The Premonition was distributed by Avco Embassy Pictures and released in the United States on May 5, 1976.

=== Home media ===
The film was released on DVD by Guilty Pleasures on July 26, 2005. It was later released for the first time on Blu-ray by Arrow Video on December 12, 2017. Arrow also released the film on DVD that same day.

== Critical reception ==
Critical response for The Premonition has been mixed, with some criticizing the writing, while others praised the film's atmosphere. Author and film critic Leonard Maltin awarded it two out of four stars, calling it "mediocre", and writing, "[its] Muddled script works against [the] eerie atmosphere in this supernatural tale." Reviewing the American Horror Project Vol. 1 release of the film, Clayton Dillard from Slant Magazine stated that the film "implicitly challenges how art cinema of the ’60s and early ’70s typically utilizes female anxiety as a source of masochistic pleasure for the viewer". The Terror Trap gave the film 2.5 out of 4 stars, writing, More atmospheric than plot driven, Premonition is a valiant effort at ambient fearmaking, but it comes up just a little short due to a convoluted and confusing tie-up."

Brett Gallman from Oh, the Horror! gave the film a positive review, writing, "The Premonition is a film that zigs and zags, though it hardly does so in a playful manner. Rather, it spirals ominously, as if bent toward some fatalistic doom. Dusk seems to have permanently settled over and around these characters, enwrapping them in a languid, hypnotic rhythm. Despite its very realistic—and grim—subject matter, the film seems to unfold under a foggy, supernatural haze that's deceptively drowsy." VideoHound’s Golden Movie Retriever called it "a well-done para-norm tale." Chris Coffel from Bloody Disgusting awarded the film a score of 3/5, criticizing the film's slow start, and slightly clunky story, but commended the film's eerie atmosphere, ending, and Lynch's performance. TV Guide gave the film two out of five stars, writing, "Blessed with a strong cast--especially Farrell and Lynch--and an excellent use of location, The Premonition is an effectively creepy film which successfully preys on very real fears without exploiting the situation for cheap thrills. At times talky and a bit slow-moving, the film nonetheless builds tension steadily and contains several unforgettably eerie scenes."
