= Let's Get It On / Do You Wanna Dance? =

1993 single by Peter Andre

"Let's Get It On" / "Do You Wanna Dance?"

Single by Peter Andre featuring Eric Sebastian

from the album Peter Andre
- Released: 22 November 1993
- Length: 3:45
- Label: Melodian
- Songwriters: Peter Andre, Cadell, Forrester, Hines, Freeman
- Producer: Forrester

Peter Andre singles chronology
"Funky Junky" (1993)	"Let's Get It On" / "Do You Wanna Dance?" (1993)	"To the Top" (1994)

"Let's Get It On" / "Do You Wanna Dance?" is the fourth single released by British-Australian singer Peter Andre from his self-titled debut album. The single was released on 22 November 1993, through Melodian Records. "Let's Get It On" features a rap from American rapper Eric Sebastian. The single peaked at number 17 on the Australian Singles Chart.

== Track listings ==
CD1 and cassette

1. "Let's Get It On" (featuring Eric Sebastian; extended dance version) – 5:03
2. "Do You Wanna Dance?" (Jamakin-It-Funky mix) – 3:23

CD2

1. "Let's Get It On" (featuring Eric Sebastian) – 4:11
2. "Do You Wanna Dance?" (Jamakin-It-Funky mix) – 3:23
3. "Let's Get It On" (Midnight mix) – 5:18

== Charts ==
Weekly chart performance for "Let's Get It On" / "Do You Wanna Dance?"
Chart (1994)	Peak position
Australia (ARIA)	17
