= Randi Oakes =

American actress and fashion model

- Oakes in CHiPs (1980)
- Born: Sumner, Iowa, United States
- Occupations: Actress; model
- Years active: 1970s–1985
- Known for: CHiPs
- Spouse: Gregory Harrison (m. 1980)
- Children: 4
- Relatives: Chloë Grace Moretz (daughter-in-law)

Randi Oakes is an American actress and fashion model. Active in the 1970s and early 1980s, she is probably best known for her role as Officer Bonnie Clark on the television series CHiPs, a role she played from 1979 to 1982. After marrying actor Gregory Harrison in 1980, she retired from acting after the birth of her first child in 1985.

== Early life ==
Oakes was born in Sumner, Iowa and grew up in Randalia, Iowa. While in high school, she went to Des Moines, Iowa twice per week to attend modeling school. Oakes was named Miss Iowa Model of the Year and moved to New York City with a modeling contract at age 17. She quickly became one of the top fashion models in the United States. While modeling, she was in a relationship with pro football star Joe Namath for seven years and was sometimes referred to as "Joe's fiancee". Oakes began a shift from modeling to acting when, at the age of 23, she overheard one model tell another, "You know, you're kind of a young Randi Oakes."

== Acting career ==
Oakes was a frequent guest star on television series during the late 1970s and early 1980s, including roles on McCloud, Delvecchio, Switch, B.J. and the Bear, Barnaby Jones, The Love Boat and Fantasy Island. She also starred as Sally in the 1978 theatrical crime drama Acapulco Gold and had recurring roles as Georgia on the 1977 television series Rosetti and Ryan and as a young Taurus woman on the original Battlestar Galactica.

A guest role as a car thief in the episode "Down Time" on CHiPs led to the featured role as the blonde police officer Bonnie Clark. She appeared on the series from the beginning of its third season until the end of its fifth season. Along with costar Larry Wilcox, Oakes left the show in 1982. According to a 1983 article that appeared in People, a lack of time spent with husband Harrison, led to the actress's departure from CHiPs.

Oakes appeared on multiple editions of Circus of the Stars, and she was a frequent competitor on (and one-time host of) Battle of the Network Stars. She was "dunked" more times than any other competitor in the Baseball Dunk event. She retired from acting to be a full-time mother after the birth of her first child in 1985. In a 1992 interview, Harrison told the Toronto Star, "[Randi has] been busy mothering, designing our home, overseeing the construction. She's glad not to be in the business. It gave her a pay cheque, period. She never studied, suffered or sacrificed to be an actress. It didn't fulfill dreams and if it doesn't fulfill dreams, it's hard to take this business. It has an ugly underbelly."

As of 2015, Oakes returned to television, with other notable CHiPs stars, for a series of introductions and interviews for MeTV's weekly CHiPs reruns.

== Family ==
While competing on a 1979 edition of Battle of the Network Stars, Oakes (on the NBC team) met her future husband, actor Gregory Harrison of Trapper John, M.D. fame (playing for the CBS team). Oakes and Harrison were married on December 21, 1980, but their marriage was kept secret from the public for several years. They have three daughters, Emma Lee (born 1985), Lily Anne (born 1989), and Kate (born 1991). The couple also adopted a son, Quinn Edgar. Since 2025, youngest daughter Kate, also a model, has been married to actress Chloe Grace Moretz. The couple originally lived together in Sherman Oaks, California, but since the early 1990s, the family has lived in Southern Oregon; first in Gold Beach, Oregon for 15 years, then Eugene, Oregon.

== Filmography ==
- Acapulco Gold (1976) - Sally Cantrell
- Battlestar Galactica (1978) - Blonde Taurus
- CHiPs (1977–1982, TV Series) - Officer Bonnie Clark / Kim Balford / Blonde Secretary
- Fantasy Island (1983) - Season 6 Episode 16. "Eternal Flame" / "A Date with Burt" March 5, 1983. Eternal Flame: A couple are obsessed with finding the Fountain of Youth. Randi Oakes Diana Weston; Linwood Boomer Alex Weston.
- Barnaby Jones (1980) - Season 8 Episode 14 “The Killing Point” Ursula
- Love Boat (1981) - Season 5 Episode 5 "Daddy's Little Girl", Marcy Crane.
- McCloud (1975–1976) - Season 6 Episode 5 "Our Man In Harem" Margo
