= Judy Norton =

American actress (born 1958)

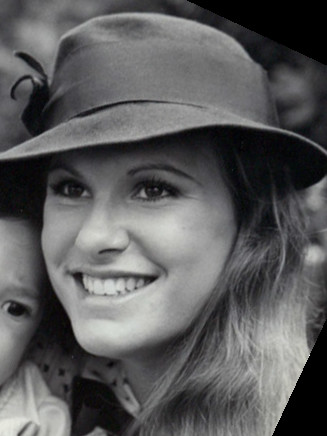
- Norton as Mary Ellen Walton, 1977
- Born: Judy Norton; January 29, 1958 (age 68); Santa Monica, California, U.S.
- Other names: Judy Norton-Graves, Judy Taylor
- Occupations: Actress; theatre director
- Years active: 1967–present
- Spouses: Douglas Taylor (m. 1976; div. 1978); Lynn Hughes (m. 1980, divorced); Randy Apostle (m. 1991; div. 2001); Robert Graves (m. 2002)
- Children: 2
- Website: judynorton.com

Judy Norton (born January 29, 1958) is an American actress and theater director who is best known for her role as Mary Ellen Walton on The Waltons television series and subsequent Waltons TV movies.

== Personal life ==
She was born in Santa Monica, California, to parents Harry and Constance (née Glazebrook) Norton. She began practicing Scientology at age 13, and became a minister in the Church. She married Douglas Taylor in 1976 at the age of 18; the marriage ended in divorce in 1978. She then married former football player Lynn Hughes whom she later divorced.

Norton posed nude for a 1985 issue of Playboy in a bid to shed her "goody-goody Waltons image". She has one son, Devin.

Norton is married to Robert Graves. Norton has been writing, directing and starring in movies and theater. She also is a singer. An avid athlete, Norton has participated in competitive horse jumping and skydiving, in addition to skiing and tennis. Norton frequently showcased her athletic skills on Battle of the Network Stars in the late 1970s and early 1980s. Her CD Reflections was released in August 2016.

On July 14, 2020, Norton launched a series on her YouTube channel entitled "Behind the Scenes with Judy Norton", where she shares information about The Waltons' filming, cast, episodes, storylines, and cast reunions. She regularly takes the opportunity to answer viewer questions, with more than 100 "Ask Judy" episodes, and she has also hosted several former cast members as well as one of the show's directors, Ralph Senensky. As of July 2025, the playlist contains 540+ videos, with new releases every few days.

== Filmography ==
Year	Title	Role	Director	Notes	Ref.
1967	Hotel	Daughter	Richard Quine		
1979	Valentine	Elizabeth	Lee Philips		
1979	A Twist of Faith	Doctor Rachmaran	Chris Angel		
2001	Off Season	Mrs. Murchison	Bruce Davison		
2013	Hansel and Gretel: Warriors of Witchcraft	Allyson	David DeCoteau		
2013	Blood Is Thicker	Doris Aster	Nicholas Lam		
2014	Finding Harmony	Kat Stratton	Dagen Merrill		
2015	Broken: A Musical	Karen David	Nancy Criss		
2015	The Sparrows: Nesting	Susan	Nancy Criss		
2016	Another Day in Paradise	Liz	Jeffery Patterson	Writer Judy Norton	
2018	NOWHERE TO HIDE / Inclusion Criteria	Tara Malone	Josh Hodgins	Writer Judy Norton	
2000	Christy: Return to Cutter Gap	Rebecca Holt	Chuck Bowman	Aired under the title Christy: The Movie	
2020	Out of the Fight	Psychologist	Steve Moon		
2022	Motorvation	Kathy	Angus Benfield		

=== Television ===
Year	Title	Role	Director	Notes	Ref.
1968	The Felony Squad	Karen Collins	George McCowan	"The Distant Shore"	Season 3 episode 11
1971	The Homecoming: A Christmas Story	Mary Ellen Walton	Fielder Cook	On Christmas Eve 1933	Earl Hamner Jr.
1972–1981	The Waltons	Mary Ellen Walton	Vincent Sherman; Alf Kjellin; Harry Harris; Robert Butler; Philip Leacock; Lee Philips; Jack Shea; Ralph Senensky; Ralph Waite; Nick Webster; Ralph Senensky; Ivan Dixon; Richard Thomas; Harvey Laidman; Richard C. Bennett; Lawrence Dobkin; Walter Alzmann; Anthony Brand; Gwen Arner; Richard Chaffee; Nell Cox; William H. Bushnell; Larry Stewart; David F. Wheeler; Stan Lathan; Herbert Hirschman; Bernard McEveety; Gabrielle Beaumont; Bob Sweeney; Walt Gilmore; James Sheldon.		
1979	Password Plus and Super Password	Judy Norton	George Choderker	American TV game show	September 7, 1979
1979	Battle of the Network Stars	Judy Norton	Andrew Glassman	Series of competitions that television stars from ABC, CBS and NBC compete in various sporting events.	
1980	Kraft Salutes Disneyland's 25th Anniversary	Judy Norton-Taylor	Dwight Hemion		
1980	Password Plus and Super Password	Judy Norton	George Choderker		
1980	Battle of the Network Stars	Judy Norton	Andrew Glassman		
1981	Battle of the Network Stars	Judy Norton	Andrew Glassman		
1982	The Love Boat	Lydia Foster	Bruce Bilson	"Doc Takes the Fifth / Safety Last / A Business Affair"	Season 5 Episode 13
1982	A Wedding on Walton's Mountain	Mary Ellen Walton	Lee Philips	It is 1947	
1982	Mother's Day on Walton's Mountain	Mary Ellen Walton	Gwen Arner	Mary Ellen marries Jonesy	
1982	A Day for Thanks on Walton's Mountain	Mary Ellen Walton	Harry Harris	Thanksgiving Day 1947	
1982	Password Plus and Super Password	Judy Norton	George Choderker		
1983	Circus of the Stars	Judy Norton	CBS network	Celebrities performed circus-type acts.	show 8)
1984	Circus of the Stars	Judy Norton	CBS network	Celebrities performed circus-type acts.	show 9)
1984	Password Plus and Super Password	Judy Norton	George Choderker		
1993	A Walton Thanksgiving Reunion	Mary Ellen Walton	Harry Harris	Thanksgiving in November 1963	
1995	A Walton Wedding	Mary Ellen Walton	Robert Ellis Miller	John-Boy's Wedding in 1964	
1997	The Last Daughter				
1997	A Walton Easter	Mary Ellen Walton	Bill Corcoran	John and Olivia's 40th anniversary in 1969	
1997	Millennium	Carol Scammel	Perry Lang	"Monster"	Season 2 Episode 4
1998	Stargate SG-1	Talia	Jonathan Glassner		
1998	The Inspectors				
1999	You, Me, and the Kids			“Facing the World”	
1999	So Weird	Mrs. Avner	Charles Wilkinson	Season 1 Episode 5 “Escape”	TV series
1999	Cold Squad	Mrs. Harris	John L'Ecuyer	television series Season 3 Episode 1	Deadly Games: Part 1
1999–2000	Beggars and Choosers (TV series)	Gloria	John L'Ecuyer	television series	"Hat Trick" Season 1 Episode 4; "Star Whores" Season 1 episode 15; "Moles, Meatloaf & Myrna Loy" Season 2 episode 14.
2000	Ed (TV series)	Judge	James Frawley	Pilot show	Season 1 episode 1
2000	Hollywood Off Ramp		Richard Martin	The Ultimate Question	Season 1 episode 12 modern day Twilight Zone anthology series that aired on E! E! Hollywood Offramp
2000	Higher Ground	Dr. Gray	Alan Simmonds	Season 1 Episode 10 “Close Encounters”	TV series
2010	A Walton's Family Reunion	Mary Ellen Walton	Doug Butts	It is 1969. John and Olivia 40th anniversary.	Surviving cast members reminisce about the series and their lives.
2013	Bluff	Sophia Wyndom	Judy Norton and Neil Schell	TV series	6 episodes: season 1 episodes 1 – 6: “Do the Thing”; “Live Out Land”; “They Never Fail”; “Do One Thing”; Episode #1.5 & #1.6.”
2014	Disorganized Zone	The Organizer	Judy Norton	half-hour dramatic comedy that spoofs Twilight Zone episodes	7 episodes: “A Past Not So Dear”; “Universe Two”; “Too Perfect”; “Promises”; “The Beaten Path”; “Deadly Labels”; “Tomorrow”.
2020	The Quarantine Bunch	Judy Norton	Jeff MacIntyre	Season 1 Episode 1 -6 “Meet the Bunch”; “Good-bye Chewy”; “You want to sell what?” “A Tale of two zooms”, “Stay the F**K Home!”; “Shut up and ACT!!!”.	Former child stars support group via Zoom during the Coronavirus quarantine.

=== Music ===
Year	Title	Role	Director	Notes	Ref.
1999	A Walton Christmas: Together Again	Mary Ellen Walton	Jon Walmsley	Track Listings: Walton's Theme; Earl Hamner's Narrative; Christmas Times A Comin'; Intro to Mama's Applesauce Cake; Mama's Applesauce Cake; Sleigh Ride; Follow That Star; That's What Christmas Means to Me; Intro to Have Yourself A Merry Little Christmas; Have Yourself A Merry Little Christmas; Intro To Snowman Land; Snowman Land; 'Twas The Night Before Christmas; Little Drummer Boy; Home For The Holidays; Santa's Big Parade; Intro to All I Want For Christmas; All I Want For Christmas; Good Night (With Dialogue)	
2015	Reflections	Judy Norton			
2022	Home for Christmas	Judy Norton			
