= Peter Andre (album) =

Studio album by Peter Andre
- Released: 29 November 1993
- Recorded: 1992–1993
- Genres: Pop, R&B
- Length: 46:33
- Label: Melodian
- Producer: Peter Andre

Peter Andre chronology
Peter Andre (1993)	Natural (1996)

Singles from Peter André
- 1. "Drive Me Crazy" Released: 20 April 1992; 2. "Gimme Little Sign" Released: 26 October 1992; 3. "Funky Junky" Released: 31 May 1993; 4. "Let's Get It On / Do You Wanna Dance?" Released: 22 November 1993; 5. "To the Top" Released: 11 April 1994

Peter Andre is the debut album by Australian singer-songwriter Peter Andre, released on 29 November 1993 in Australia. Five singles were released in Australia to promote the album, including "Gimme Little Sign", which reached number three on the ARIA Singles Chart. The album peaked at number 27 on the Australian albums chart and was certified gold by the Australian Recording Industry Association (ARIA).

== Background ==
In 1990, Andre became famous when he took part in the Australian television talent show New Faces. Following Andre's success in the program, Melodian Records offered him a £1 million pound record deal. In 1992, Andre released his debut single, "Drive Me Crazy", which peaked at number 72 on the Australian singles chart. However, Andre's musical breakthrough occurred with his second single, "Gimme Little Sign", which peaked at number three in Australia and spent 35 weeks in the top 100. Andre's self-titled debut album was released in November 1993, peaking at number 27 on the Australian albums chart. Three further singles were released from the album: "Funky Junky", which was regularly used as background music in soap opera Neighbours, the double A-side "Let's Get It On / Do You Wanna Dance?" and "To the Top", all of which peaked within the Australian Top 50. In 1993, "Gimme Little Sign" received an ARIA Award for the highest selling single of the year recorded by an Australian artist. Originally, the album was only made available for sale in Australia; however, following Andre's successful Japanese breakthrough, the album was later issued in the country with new cover artwork on 5 January 1994. Both copies of the album share an identical track listing. Following Andre's international breakthrough, "To the Top" later appeared on the British release of his second studio album, Natural.

== Track listing ==
Peter Andre track listing
No.	Title	Writer(s)	Producer(s)	Length
1.	"To the Top"	Peter Andre; Ashley Cadell	Cadell; Mark Forrester	4:21
2.	"Let's Get It On" (featuring Eric Sebastian)	Andre; Cadell; Forrester; Marcia Hines	Cadell; Forrester	4:11
3.	"Drive Me Crazy" (R&B Mix)	Andre; Phil Harding; Ian Curnow	Harding; Curnow	3:58
4.	"Nice 'n' Slow"	Andre; Cadell	Cadell; Forrester	5:12
5.	"Funky Junky" (rap; featuring Maurice Llewelyn)	Andre; Antoine Palade	Cadell	3:51
6.	"Do You Wanna Dance?" (Jamakin-It-Funky Mix; featuring Tony Kopa)	Robert Freeman	Ross Cockle; Craig Hamath	3:23
7.	"Take Me Back"	P. Andre; Michael Andre	Cadell; Forrester	5:14
8.	"Dream a Little"	P. Andre; Chris Andre	Cadell; Forrester	4:10
9.	"Through the Night" (featuring Tony Kopa)	Andre	Cockle; Hamath	3:54
10.	"Gimme Little Sign"	Smith; Hooven; Winn	Harding; Curnow	3:28
11.	"I'm Gonna Get to You" (featuring Eric Sebastian; hidden track)	Andre	Cadell; Forrester	4:51
Total length:				46:33

== Charts ==
Chart performance for Peter Andre
Chart (1993)	Peak position
Australian Albums (ARIA)	27

== Certifications ==
Certifications for Peter Andre
Region	Certification	Certified units/sales
Australia (ARIA)	Gold	35,000^{^}
^{^} Shipments figures based on certification alone.
