= What If God Fell from the Sky =

1994 single by Danielle Brisebois

Single by Danielle Brisebois

from the album Arrive All Over You
- B-side: "Sinking Slow"
- Released: 1994
- Genre: Rock
- Length: 2:54
- Label: Epic
- Songwriters: Danielle Brisebois, Gregg Alexander
- Producer: Gregg Alexander

Danielle Brisebois singles chronology
| "What If God Fell from the Sky" (1994) | "Gimme Little Sign" (1994) |

"What If God Fell from the Sky" is a song by American singer and songwriter Danielle Brisebois, released as the first single off her debut album, Arrive All Over You (1994). The song's title is often confused with lyrics in the chorus to Joan Osborne's "One of Us", but Brisebois's song was released a year earlier. In 2004, it was featured in the soundtrack to the film Saved!.

== Track listing ==
1. "What If God Fell from the Sky" (Danielle Brisebois, Gregg Alexander) – 2:53
2. "Ain't Gonna Cry No More" (Brisebois, Alexander) – 4:47
3. "Sinking Slow" (Brisebois, Andy Sturmer, Roger Manning, Alexander) – 3:42

== Charts ==
| Chart (1994) | Peak position |
|---|---|
| US Cash Box Top 100 | 80 |
