= Funky Junky =

1993 single by Peter Andre

Single by Peter Andre

from the album Peter Andre
- Released: 30 May 1993
- Length: 3:45
- Label: Melodian
- Songwriter(s): Peter Andre, Antoine Palade
- Producer(s): Ashley Cadell

Peter Andre singles chronology
"Gimme Little Sign" (1992)	"Funky Junky" (1993)	"Let's Get It On" / "Do You Wanna Dance?" (1993)

"Funky Junky" is the third single from Australian singer Peter Andre's self-titled debut album. The song was released on 30 May 1993 through Melodian Records. The song frequently featured as background music in Australian soap opera Neighbours in 1993. "Funky Junky" peaked at number 13 on the Australian Singles Chart and was certified gold by the Australian Recording Industry Association (ARIA). A music video was made which that Livinia Nixon as one of the dancers.

== Track listing ==
CD1 and cassette

1. "Funky Junky" (version without rap) – 3:33
2. "Funky Junky" (Mental mix) – 6:14

CD2

1. "Funky Junky" (version with rap) – 3:51
2. "Funky Junky" (Mental mix) – 6:14
3. "Funky Junky" (instrumental) – 3:51

== Charts ==
=== Weekly charts ===
Chart (1993)	Peak position
Australia (ARIA)	13

=== Year-end charts ===
Chart (1993)	Position
Australia (ARIA)	62

== Certifications ==
Region	Certification	Certified units/sales
Australia (ARIA)	Gold	35,000^{^}
^{^} Shipments figures based on certification alone.
