= Portable Life =

Studio album by Danielle Brisebois
- Released: September 30, 2008 (digital)
- Genre: Rock
- Length: 46:37
- Label: RCA Records
- Producer: Gregg Alexander

Danielle Brisebois chronology
Just Missed the Train (2006)	Portable Life (2008)

Professional ratings
Review scores
Source	Rating
Allmusic	(3/5)
CandidCritic	(Favorable)
Slant magazine	(Favorable)

Portable Life is the second studio album by American singer-songwriter Danielle Brisebois. Originally scheduled for October 26, 1999, the album's release was delayed until September 2008, when RCA Records released the album as a digital download on iTunes and Amazon MP3. Promotional CD copies of Portable Life and the single "I've Had It" were pressed in 1999 and are now difficult to obtain.

The album was recorded shortly after the disbandment of the band New Radicals, of which Brisebois was one of the two permanent members. The album was produced by New Radicals leader Gregg Alexander, who also co-wrote most of the songs with Brisebois. Alexander had also produced Brisebois' previous solo album Arrive All Over You, and she in turn appeared on his solo album Intoxifornication before the formation of New Radicals.

Two songs from the album, "Just Missed The Train" and "Need A Little Love", later appeared on Carly Hennessy's 2001 album Ultimate High, which was produced by Brisebois and Alexander. Additionally, "Just Missed the Train" had already appeared on Brisebois' first album Arrive All Over You (albeit in a different version) and was also covered by several other artists, including Trine Rein, Maarja and Kelly Clarkson.

"Everything My Heart Desires" was one of two songs Brisebois contributed to the movie As Good as It Gets (the other being "My Only") and was also included on the movie's soundtrack.

== Track listing ==
All tracks are written by Danielle Brisebois and Gregg Alexander, except where noted.

No.	Title	Writer(s)	Length
1.	"I've Had It"		3:21
2.	"Five Friends"		3:27
3.	"Temporary Like the Rain"		2:36
4.	"Stop It Hurts You're Killing Me Don't Stop"		2:58
5.	"If I Died Tonight You'd Have to Think of Me"		4:58
6.	"Going Down the Wrong Way"		3:28
7.	"Need a Little Love"		4:08
8.	"Just Missed the Train"	Brisebois, Scott Cutler	4:43
9.	"My Dreaming Days Are Thru"		3:27
10.	"Give Me a Day"		5:04
11.	"I Had a Dream"	Brisebois	4:28
12.	"Everything My Heart Desires"	Phil Roy, Peter Blakeley	3:59
Total length:			46:37
