= Drive Me Crazy (song) =

1992 single by Peter Andre

Single by Peter Andre

from the album Peter Andre
- Released: 20 April 1992
- Length: 4:04
- Label: Melodian
- Songwriter(s): Peter Andre, Phil Harding, Ian Curnow
- Producer(s): Phil Harding, Ian Curnow

Peter Andre singles chronology
"Drive Me Crazy" (1992)	"Gimme Little Sign" (1992)

"Drive Me Crazy" is a song by English singer Peter Andre from his self-titled debut album. It was released as his debut single on 20 April 1992 through Melodian Records. The song peaked at number 72 on the Australian Singles Chart in June 1992.

== Track listings ==
CD1 and cassette

1. "Drive Me Crazy" (R'N'B mix) – 3:58
2. "Drive Me Crazy" (Crazy Cool Funk mix) – 6:36

CD2

1. "Drive Me Crazy" (single mix) – 4:04
2. "Drive Me Crazy" (Crazy Cool Funk mix) – 6:36
3. "Drive Me Crazy" (instrumental) – 4:03

== Charts ==
Weekly chart performance for "Drive Me Crazy"
Chart (1992)	Peak position
Australia (ARIA)	72
