= Danielle Brisebois =

American actress and musician (born 1969)

- Brisebois in Archie Bunker's Place, 1980

Background information
- Born: June 28, 1969 (age 57); Brooklyn, New York, U.S.
- Genre: Pop rock
- Occupations: Actress; singer; songwriter; producer
- Instruments: Vocals; percussion; piano; guitar
- Years active: 1976–present
- Labels: Epic; RCA; EMI
- Formerly of: New Radicals
- Spouse: Nick Lashley (m. 2008)
- Website: www.daniellebrisebois.com

Danielle Brisebois (born June 28, 1969) is an American producer, singer, songwriter and former child actress. She is best known for her role as Stephanie Mills on the Norman Lear-produced sitcoms All in the Family and its spin-off Archie Bunker's Place (for which she was nominated for a Golden Globe Award), as well as playing Molly in the original Broadway production of the musical Annie.

After she retired from acting in the late 1980s, Brisebois pursued a music career. She is one of the two permanent members of the rock band New Radicals, along with her longtime songwriting partner Gregg Alexander, and serves as the group's keyboardist, percussionist and backing vocalist. She has also recorded two solo albums, Arrive All Over You and Portable Life, both of which were produced by Alexander. She has written or co-written a number of songs, including Natasha Bedingfield's hit singles "Unwritten" and "Pocketful of Sunshine".

In January 2015, Brisebois and Alexander were nominated for an Academy Award for Best Original Song for the song "Lost Stars" from the film Begin Again (2013).

== Biography ==
=== Early life ===
On June 28, 1969 (57 years ago), Brisebois was born and raised in Canarsie, Brooklyn, New York. She is the daughter of Mary and Frank Brisebois, the latter a computer instructor. She is of French-Canadian and Italian descent.

=== Acting career ===
In 1976, at the age of seven, Brisebois began her career as a child actress appearing in her first movie, The Premonition (1976).

In 1977, Brisebois appeared in an episode of Kojak and began starring in the original Broadway cast of Annie as the youngest of the orphans, Molly. Jay-Z later sampled a clip of the orphaned girls from Annie for his song "Hard Knock Life (Ghetto Anthem)".

In the late 1970s, Brisebois joined the cast of All in the Family, then co-starred in its continuation Archie Bunker's Place from 1979 to 1983.

Brisebois was nominated for five Youth in Film Awards from 1980 to 1984, winning two; in 1981 as Best Young Actress in a TV Special for Mom, the Wolfman and Me, and in 1982 as Best Young Actress in a Television Series for Archie Bunker's Place. In 1982, she was also nominated for a Golden Globe Award as Best Supporting Actress in a Series, Mini-Series or Motion Picture Made for TV, again for Archie Bunker's Place.

In the early 1980s, Brisebois appeared in several episodes of Battle of the Network Stars and Circus of the Stars, and played the daughter of William Devane's character on Knots Landing in the series' fifth season. In the late 1980s, she made several single-episode appearances in various TV series, including Hotel, Mr. Belvedere, Murder, She Wrote, Tales from the Darkside, and Days of Our Lives.

=== Music career ===
In the early 1990s, Brisebois transitioned to a career as a recording artist by providing backing vocals on rock singer Gregg Alexander's album Intoxifornication (1992); this marked the beginning of a long-standing collaboration with Alexander, who co-wrote, produced, and sang on her first solo album, Arrive All Over You (1994). Despite a disappointing commercial performance in the U.S., the album became a minor hit in Europe. Arrive All Over You performed well critically and continues to maintain a cult following. Mackenzie Wilson of Allmusic described the album as "an earnest and impressive effort ... [that] went largely unnoticed during the reign of gangsta rap and grunge", comparing it favorably to Alanis Morissette's Jagged Little Pill (1995), released the following year. Her cover of "Gimme Little Sign" was a minor hit in Europe.

In 1998, Brisebois became a member of Alexander's New Radicals group, who scored their greatest successes with the hit single "You Get What You Give", and the million-selling album Maybe You've Been Brainwashed Too. She provided distinctive female vocals to the group's sound on tracks such as "Mother We Just Can't Get Enough" and "Jehovah Made This Whole Joint For You". Alexander disbanded the group in 1999, but went on to produce and co-write Brisebois' second solo album Portable Life, which was originally scheduled to be released on October 26, 1999. Promotional copies of the album and the single "I've Had It" were distributed, reviews appeared in the press, and an "I've Had It" video was even shot, but for unknown reasons RCA Records cancelled the release at the last minute. The album was delayed until September 30, 2008, when it was released as a digital download via iTunes and Amazon.com. A compilation album of Arrive All Over You-era tracks, titled Just Missed the Train, was later released through Sony BMG on September 26, 2006.

Brisebois has written and produced numerous songs for various other artists, including Carly Smithson, Clay Aiken, Kelly Clarkson, Sophie Ellis-Bextor, Paula Abdul, and Kylie Minogue. She co-wrote Natasha Bedingfield's Top 10 hits "Unwritten" and "Pocketful of Sunshine", and "Stamp Your Feet" for Donna Summer. In November 2008 she reunited with Alexander, former New Radicals guitarist Rusty Anderson, and producer Rick Nowels as The Not So Silent Majority. She sang lead vocals on their song "Obama Rock", supporting the election of Barack Obama. In 2009 she contributed two songs to the Leona Lewis album Echo, including "Alive" and "Let It Rain". Later that year, Danielle won big at the BMI Awards, both in the US and UK, with "Pocketful of Sunshine", including two of the top awards, the Robert S. Musel award for Song of the Year, and the College Song of the Year, as well as a third award for Film and Television for "Unwritten".

In 2005, Brisebois ranked number 50 of VH1's 100 Greatest Kid Stars.

=== Marriage ===
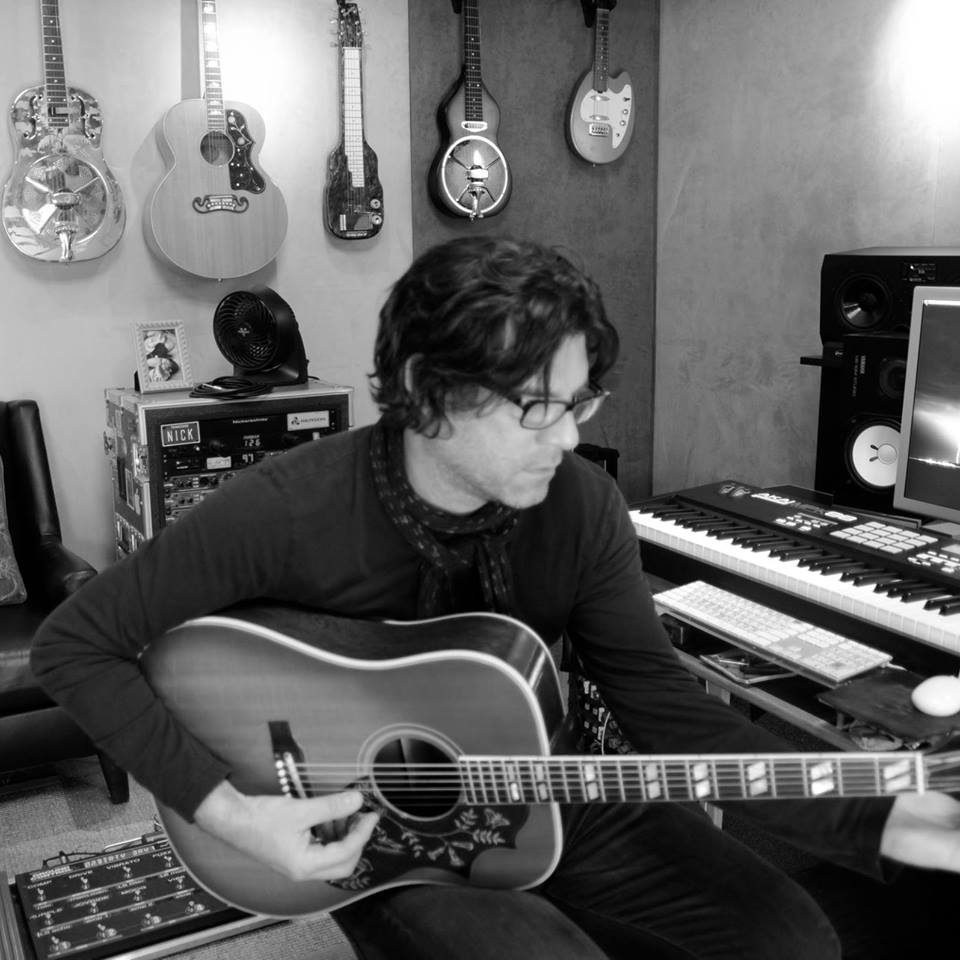
Nick Lashley working in his studio (2018).

On August 2, 2008, Brisebois married producer, composer, and guitarist Nick Lashley. They have identical twin daughters named Charlotte and Lola who were born in December 2013. Brisebois enjoys a secluded life with her family and avoids the media spotlight.

=== Recent work ===
In 2012, Brisebois co-wrote the Halestorm song "Here's to Us", which was featured in a season three episode of Glee.

Brisebois co-wrote songs for the feature film Begin Again (2013), including "Lost Stars", which was nominated for Best Original Song at the 2015 Academy Awards.

In 2026, Brisebois became active with New Radicals once again. She produced a re-worked version of Michelle Branch's "The Game of Love", featuring Gregg Alexander on vocals. She also created the cover art for the song's single. The same month, New Radicals released the song "One Night Only (Break Loose, Break Free!)" as part of the soundtrack for the film "One Night Only".

== Filmography ==
Film
Year	Title	Role	Notes
1976	The Premonition	Janie Bennett	Film debut
1978	If Ever I See You Again	Amy Morrison	
1978	Slow Dancing in the Big City	Ribi Ciano	
1978	King of the Gypsies	Young Tita	Credited as Danielle Brisbois
1987	Big Bad Mama II	Billie Jean McClatchie	
1990	Kill Crazy	Libby	Direct-to-video release
1997	As Good as It Gets	Singer	

Television
Year	Title	Role	Notes
1977	Kojak	Jamie Magid	2 episodes
1978	This Is the Life	Tammy	Episode: "The Stableboy's Christmas"
1978–1979	All in the Family	Stephanie Mills	24 episodes
1979–1983	Archie Bunker's Place	Stephanie Mills	81 episodes
1980	Mom, the Wolfman and Me	Jenny Bergman	Television movie
1981	Battle of the Network Stars X	Self - CBS Team	
1982	Battle of the Network Stars XII	Self - CBS Team	
1983	Battle of the Network Stars XIV	Self - CBS Team	
1983	The Love Boat	Melissa Weatherly	Episode: "[...]The Reluctant Father"
1983–1984	Knots Landing	Mary-Frances Sumner	7 episodes
1985	Circus of the Stars #10	Self - Performer	
1987	Mr. Belvedere	Kerry	Episode: "The Crush"
1987	Down and Out in Beverly Hills	Ally	Episode: "Max Bedroom"
1987	Murder, She Wrote	Kim Bechet	Episode: "A Fashionable Way to Die"
1987	Tales from the Darkside	Amanda Polo	Episode: "The Yattering and Jack"
1987	Days of Our Lives	Sasha Roberts #2	Unknown episodes
1997	Aaahh!!! Real Monsters	Lucy (voice)	Episode: "The Lips Have It/Escape Claws"
1998	Stories From My Childhood	Eliza (voice)	Episode: "The Wild Swans"

== Discography ==
=== Studio albums ===
- Arrive All over You (1994)
- Portable Life (2008)

=== Compilation albums ===
- Just Missed the Train (2006)

=== Singles ===
- "What If God Fell from the Sky" (1994)
- "Gimme Little Sign" (1995, #75 UK charts; #51 German charts)
- "I Don't Wanna Talk About Love" (1995)
- "I've Had It" (1999, promotional single only)

=== Other ===
- Annie (1977 Original Broadway Cast Recording) as Molly

== Songwriting credits ==
- Paula Abdul
  - "I'm Just Here For the Music"
- Clay Aiken
  - "Perfect Day"
- David Archuleta
  - "Things Are Gonna Get Better"
- Begin Again soundtrack
  - "Lost Stars" by Adam Levine and Keira Knightley (also co-produced)
  - "Coming Up Roses" Keira Knightley (also co-produced)
  - "A Step You Can't Take Back" by Keira Knightley
- Natasha Bedingfield
  - "Unwritten" #1 Single Billboard Pop 100
  - "Pocketful of Sunshine" #5 Single Billboard Hot 100
  - "We're All Mad"
  - "Drop Me in the Middle"
  - "Piece of Your Heart"
  - "All I Need" featuring Kevin Rudolph
  - "Try"
  - "When You Know You Know"
  - "Good on Me" (B Side)
- Boyzone
  - "Love Is a Hurricane"
- Greyson Chance
  - "Light Up the Dark"
  - "Heart Like Stone"
  - "Purple Sky"
- Charice
  - "Lighthouse"
- Kelly Clarkson
  - "Just Missed the Train"
- Sophie Ellis-Bextor
  - "Fake Love to Me"
  - "Running Out"
- Dia Frampton
  - "Homeless"
- Halestorm
  - "Here's To Us" (#1 Rock Song iTunes)
- Carly Hennessy
  - "Beautiful You"
  - "No One's Safe From Goodbye"
- Jamelia
  - "Tripping Over You"
- Leona Lewis
  - "Alive"
  - "Let It Rain"
- Lilygreen & Maguire
  - "Given Up Giving Up"
- Kimberley Locke
  - "Everyday Angels"
- Kylie Minogue
  - "Boombox"
  - "I'm Just Here For the Music"
  - "My Image Unlimited"
- Mandy Moore
  - "Someday We'll Know"
- Leigh Nash
  - "Just a Little"
- Ne-Yo, Johnny Rzeznik, Natasha Bedingfield, Herbie Hancock, Delta Rae
  - "Forward"
- New Radicals
  - "Someday We'll Know"
- Trine Rein
  - "Just Missed The Train"
- Samantha Stollenwerck
  - "Carefree"
  - "Is This My Life"
- Donna Summer
  - "Stamp Your Feet" (#1 Single Billboard Dance Chart)
  - "Driving Down Brazil"
  - "Crayons" featuring Ziggy Marley

== Awards and nominations ==
=== Awards won ===
- 1981 Young Artist Award – Best Young Actress in a TV Special; for Mom, the Wolfman and Me
- 1982 Young Artist Award – Best Young Actress in a Television Series; for Archie Bunker's Place
- 2009 BMI – The Robert S. Musel Award; for "Pocketful of Sunshine"
- 2009 BMI – College Song; for "Pocketful of Sunshine"
- 2009 BMI – Pop Award; for "Pocketful of Sunshine"
- 2009 BMI – Cable Award; The Hills

=== Nominations ===
- 1980 Young Artist Award – Best Juvenile Actress in a TV Series or Special; for All in the Family
- 1981 Young Artist Award – Best Young Actress in a Television Series; for Archie Bunker's Place
- 1982 Golden Globe Award – Best Supporting Actress in a Series, Mini-Series or Motion Picture Made for TV; for Archie Bunker's Place
- 1983 Young Artist Award – Best Young Actress in a Television Series; for Archie Bunker's Place
- 1984 Young Artist Award – Best Young Actress in a Television Series; for Archie Bunker's Place
- 2015 Academy Award – Best Original Song; for "Lost Stars" from Begin Again.
