= To the Top (Peter Andre song) =

Single by Peter Andre

from the album Peter Andre
- Released: April 1994
- Recorded: 1992
- Genre: Dance-pop, R&B
- Length: 4:02
- Label: Melodian
- Songwriters: Peter Andre, Ashley Cadell
- Producer: Ashley Cadell

Peter Andre singles chronology
"Let's Get It On / Do You Wanna Dance?" (1993)	"To the Top" (1994)	"Turn It Up" (1995)

"To the Top" is the fifth and final single released by Australian singer Peter Andre from his self-titled debut album. The single was released in April 1994, through Melodian Records. The single peaked at #46 on the Australian Singles Chart. The song was also re-written to contain sport-related lyrics, and this version was used as the official theme for the 1994 FIFA World Cup. This version appears on the second physical single.

== Track listing ==
=== CD1 / Cassette 1 ===
1. "To the Top" (Slammin' Jam Radio Edit) – 4:02
2. "To the Top" (Album Version) – 4:21
3. "To the Top" (Instrumental) – 4:21
4. "To the Top" (Slammin' Jam Extended Mix) – 6:15

=== CD2 / Cassette 2 ===
1. "To the Top" (World Cup '94 Version) – 4:11
2. "Gonna Get to You" (Metropolis Mix) – 3:58
3. "To the Top" (SBS Mix) – 4:27
4. "To the Top" (Take It Higher Mix) – 6:18

== Charts ==
Chart (1994)	Peak position
Australia (ARIA)	46
