= Circus of the Stars =

- Genre: Variety show
- Narrated by: Johnny Gilbert
- Country of origin: United States
- Original language: English
- No. of episodes: 19

Production
- Camera setup: Multi-camera
- Running time: 45–48 minutes

Original release
- Network: CBS
- Release: January 10, 1977 – December 16, 1994

Circus of the Stars is a series of television specials based on celebrities performing circus acts. Filmed at the main Universal Pictures studio lot, CBS broadcast 19 specials from 1977 to 1994. The series featured many leading film and television stars over nearly two decades.

The concept had its origins outside the United States, notably Stars in der Manege (1959–2008) in Germany.

== Other versions and variations ==
The concept of celebrities turning their hand to circus acts has proved attractive to program makers around the world. The German show Stars in der Manege began in 1959 and continued annually as a charity fundraising special until 2008. It was made each winter in the Circus Krone Building in Munich, and broadcast on or around Boxing Day.

Production company Endemol has developed a reality television format called Celebrity Circus, which takes stars from fields such as entertainment and sport, and shows them being trained in circus acts over a period of weeks. A version aired in Australia in 2005, and a Portuguese version in 2006. A British version was mooted and announcements were made that NBC had picked up the format for the American market in 2008. Variety reported that ABC might be looking to relaunch Circus of the Stars, while CBS and Fox were purportedly interested in circus concepts, as well.

== List of celebrities ==
The following list illustrates the range and status of celebrities who appeared across the run of the series.

- Kyle Aletter (show 9)
- Kristian Alfonso (show 14)
- Marty Allen (shows 2, 3, 4, 5, 6, 7, & 8)
- Harry Anderson (shows 17 & 19)
- Loni Anderson (shows 4 & 17)
- Louie Anderson
- Melissa Sue Anderson (show 14)
- Susan Anton (show 16)
- Lucie Arnaz (shows 2 & 10)
- Bea Arthur (shows 10 & 13)
- Rebeca Arthur (shows 13, 14, & 15)
- Ed Asner (show 1)
- Lauren Bacall (show 3)
- Scott Baio (shows 5, 7, & 19)
- Lucille Ball (show 2)
- Bob Barker (show 5)
- Barbi Benton (shows 4, 5, & 7)
- Mayim Bialik (show 14)
- Jane Birkin (show 1)
- Karen Black (show 14)
- Nina Blackwood (show 16)
- Linda Blair (shows 7, 8, & 15)
- Dirk Blocker (show 3)
- Lindsay Bloom (shows 7 & 9)
- Lloyd Bridges (show 5)
- Todd Bridges (shows 6 & 7)
- Danielle Brisebois (show 6, 7, & 10)
- Morgan Brittany (show 15)
- Downtown Julie Brown (show 17)
- Delta Burke (show 12)
- Steve Burton (actor) (show 13)
- Candace Cameron Bure
- Claudia Cardinale (show 1)
- Dixie Carter (show 16)
- Lynda Carter (shows 1 & 2)
- Nell Carter (show 10)
- Carol Channing (show 12)
- Candy Clark (shows 4, 10, & 12)
- Dick Clark (shows 10, 11, & 15)
- Julie Condra (show 16)
- Wendy Cox [The New Lassie]
- Cathy Lee Crosby (shows 3, 4, & 10)
- Adam Curry (show 18)
- Jamie Lee Curtis (show 2)
- Tony Curtis (show 8)
- Beverly D'Angelo (show 8)
- Sammy Davis Jr. (show 3)
- Phyllis Diller (show 8, 10, & 19)
- Shannen Doherty (shows 10 & 11)
- Tony Dow
- Debbe Dunning (show 19)
- Patrick Duffy (show 17)
- Barbara Eden (show 11)
- Nicole Eggert (shows 11 & 12)
- Britt Ekland (shows 6 & 11)
- Erika Eleniak (show 7)
- Erik Estrada (show 4)
- Douglas Fairbanks Jr. (show 4)
- Morgan Fairchild (show 7)
- Jamie Farr (shows 3, 4, 6, 8, & 9)
- Maureen Flannigan (show 14)
- Peter Fonda (shows 1 & 2)
- Glenn Ford (show 12)
- Ami Foster (show 10)
- Zsa Zsa Gabor (show 4)
- Jennie Garth (show 14)
- Gil Gerard (show 5)
- Marla Gibbs (show 12)
- Tracey Gold (show 8)
- Whoopi Goldberg (show 15)
- Marjoe Gortner (shows 4, 5, 6, 7, & 12)
- Mark-Paul Gosselaar (show 15)†
- Louis Gossett Jr. (show 8)
- Andre Gower (show 8)
- Linda Gray (show 5)
- Sylver Gregory (show 17)
- Merv Griffin (shows 9, 10, 11, & 12)
- Scott Grimes (show 11)
- Khrystyne Haje (show 13)
- Deidre Hall (shows 10, 14, & 18)
- Dorothy Hamill (show 11)
- George Hamilton (show 1)
- Mary Hart (shows 10, 11, & 13)
- Joey Heatherton (show 1)
- Lauri Hendler (show 10)
- Christopher Hewett (show 13)
- Hulk Hogan (show 18)
- Telma Hopkins (shows 10 & 14)
- Rock Hudson (show 5)
- Vanilla Ice (show 16)
- David Janssen (show 1)
- Ann Jillian (shows 8 & 15)
- James Earl Jones (show 2)
- William Katt (show 16)
- Stacy Keach (show 14)
- Sally Kellerman (show 6)
- Jayne Kennedy (show 5)
- Richard Kiel (show 4)
- Sally Kirkland (show 17)
- Jack Klugman (show 2)
- Burt Lancaster (show 10)
- Judy Landers (show 7)
- Heather Langenkamp (show 13)
- A. J. Langer (show 19)
- Angela Lansbury (show 5)
- Michele Lee (shows 5 & 8)
- Janet Leigh (show 1)
- Jerry Lewis (show 3)
- Mario López (show 14)
- Greg Louganis (show 11)
- Jamie Luner (show 14)
- Carol Lynley (show 3)
- Julie McCullough (show 14)
- Roddy McDowall (show 7)
- Patricia McPherson (show 9)
- Barbara Mandrell (show 14)
- Lee Meriwether (shows 2, 3, 4, & 9)
- Kari Michaelsen (show 8)
- Lara Jill Miller (show 10)
- Mary Ann Mobley (shows 2, 3, & 4)
- Shemar Moore
- Pat Morita (shows 1 & 12)
- Anita Morris (shows 7, 11, & 13)
- Martin Mull (show 13)
- Leslie Nielsen (shows 14, 16, & 19)
- Tracy Nelson (show 9)
- Beth Newfir (Wonder Woman) (show 2)
- Bob Newhart (show 7)
- Anthony Newley (show 3)
- Judy Norton Taylor (shows 8 & 9)
- Ken Norton (show 3)
- Randi Oakes (show 5 & 6)
- LaWanda Page (show 3)
- Holly Robinson Peete (show 18)
- Valerie Perrine (shows 1, 2, 3, & 5)
- Patrick Petersen (show 11)
- Bronson Pinchot (show 12)
- Danny Pintauro (show 16)
- Dana Plato (shows 5 & 6)
- Tom Poston (show 13)
- Vincent Price (show 7)
- Juliet Prowse (show 12)
- Linda Purl (show 17)
- Alan Rachins (show 14)
- Peter Reckell (show 10)
- Lynn Redgrave (shows 8 & 14)
- Oliver Reed (show 2)
- Ernie Reyes Jr. (shows 11, 12, & 18)
- Debbie Reynolds (show 7)
- Lisa Rinna (show 15)
- Alfonso Ribeiro (shows 10, 11, 16, 17, & 18)
- Cathy Rigby (show 13)
- Cheryl Richardson (show 17)
- Joan Rivers (show 5)
- Pernell Roberts (show 10)
- Paul Rodriguez (show 16)
- Cesar Romero (show 12)
- Mickey Rooney (show 7)
- Emma Samms (shows 13 & 17)
- Telly Savalas (show 2)
- John Schneider (show 5)
- Peter Scolari (shows 7, 8, & 9)
- Rick Schroder (shows 7, 9, & 10)
- Tracy Scoggins (shows 8, 14, & 16)
- George Segal (show 9)
- Connie Sellecca (show 5)
- William Shatner (shows 7 & 9)
- Rhonda Shear (show 17)
- Brooke Shields (shows 4, 5, 6, 7, 8, & 9)
- O. J. Simpson (show 13)
- Elke Sommer (show 4)
- David Soul (show 15)
- Tom Sullivan (show 2)
- Loretta Swit (show 4)
- Krista Tesreau
- Jay Thomas (shows 16 & 18)
- Michelle Thomas (show 18)
- Charlene Tilton (shows 4 & 16)
- Deborah Tranelli (show 13)
- Alex Trebek (show 14)
- Ann Turkel (show 2)
- Lana Turner (show 10)
- Robert Urich (show 15)
- Jerry Van Dyke (show 16)
- Jenna Von Oy (show 19)
- Dee Wallace (show 11)
- Dionne Warwick (show 11)
- J. C. Wendel (show 18)
- Adam West (show 19)
- Betty White (show 2)
- "Weird Al" Yankovic (show 17)
- Michael York (show 2)
- Cory and Tina Yothers (show 10)
- Pia Zadora (show 8)
- Kim Zimmer (show 10)

†Mark-Paul Gosselaar was cast and did weeks of rehearsals but got injured before the show could be filmed.

Linda Evans was to appear in show 6 in 1981, but was injured by a 200 lb. female leopard during rehearsal. Evans was knocked down and bitten, and opted not to appear on the show after the incident. A previous incident involving a big cat occurred during taping of the first show, where Gary Collins was knocked down by a tiger, but was not injured.

== Broadcast details ==
- Circus of the Stars: January 10, 1977
- Circus of the Stars #2: December 5, 1977
- Circus of the Stars #3: December 8, 1978
- Circus of the Stars #4: December 16, 1979
- Circus of the Stars #5: December 14, 1980
- Circus of the Stars #6: December 13, 1981
- Circus of the Stars #7: December 5, 1982
- Circus of the Stars #8: December 18, 1983
- Circus of the Stars #9: December 2, 1984
- Circus of the Stars #10: December 8, 1985
- Circus of the Stars #11: December 9, 1986
- Circus of the Stars #12: December 15, 1987
- Circus of the Stars #13: November 25, 1988
- Circus of the Stars #14: November 22, 1989
- Circus of the Stars #15: November 21, 1990
- Circus of the Stars #16: November 29, 1991
- Circus of the Stars and Sideshow: November 27, 1992
- Circus of the Stars Gives Kids the World: November 26, 1993
- Circus of the Stars Goes to Disneyland: December 16, 1994
