= Carly Smithson =

Irish singer

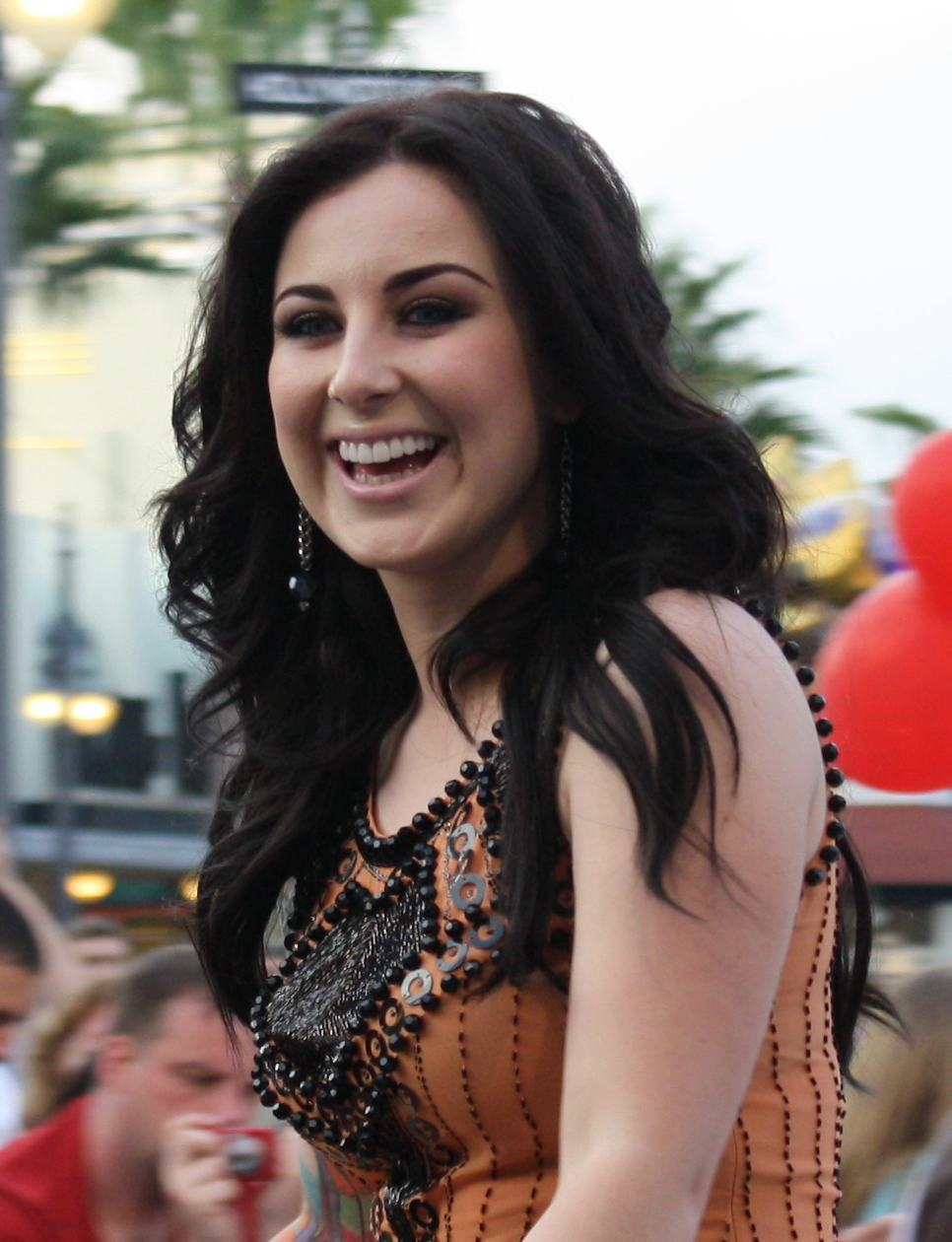
- Smithson in the American Idol Experience motorcade at Walt Disney World in 2009

Background information
- Born: Carly Sarah Hennessy; 12 September 1983 (age 43); Dublin, Ireland
- Genres: Pop rock; pop; soul
- Occupations: Singer; songwriter
- Years active: 1990–present
- Labels: MCA; Universal Republic
- Member of: We Are the Fallen

Carly Sarah Smithson (née Hennessy; born 12 September 1983) is an Irish soul and pop rock singer who was the sixth place finalist on the seventh season of American Idol in 2008. In 2001, Smithson had released her first studio album for MCA Records called Ultimate High. Smithson was dropped from the record label in 2002. After being introduced to former Evanescence guitarist Ben Moody in early 2009, plans for Smithson's post-Idol solo album were scrapped and instead she became the lead singer of the rock band We Are the Fallen. She also sings in The Tribe, a revolving group of Los Angeles musicians and singers that includes Stephen John Kalinich, Freebo, Fuzzbee Morse, Gary Stockdale, Grant Geissman, Rosemary Butler, Marc Mann, Gary Griffin, The Honeys, and Band Manager Lauri Reimer.

== Biography ==
=== Early life and education ===
Smithson was born in Dublin to Marie Murray and Luke Hennessy. After living 6 months in Dublin, Smithson and her parents moved to Johannesburg, South Africa. She lived there until they moved back to Dublin when she was 4 years old. Smithson began singing around the age of 4 and has also had some experience with acting. She was featured in advertisements for Denny's Sausage for three years, starting at the age of five. In 1990, Smithson played Young Marianne in Fools of Fortune. Two years later, in 1992, she joined the cast of Les Misérables and starred as Little Cosette in Ireland. When she was 10 years old, she released an independent CD titled Carly's Christmas Album which was released in the United Kingdom. Smithson's parents separated when she was fourteen. She and her father relocated to Los Angeles the following year, in 1999, so that Smithson could pursue a career in music. Smithson is a high school drop-out.

=== Personal life ===
After Smithson's record deal with MCA Records dissolved, she decided to take a break from music. She met her husband Todd Smithson, a tattoo artist, in San Diego. They lived in Marietta, Georgia, for a few years, where Smithson worked at an Irish bar called Fado. In a coincidental connection, Michael Johns (an American Idol season 7 finalist) performed weekly at Fado, under his real name Michael Lee.

During the time that she was on Idol, reports claimed that her unfinished sleeve tattoo on her right arm seemed to be a drawing of Amy Winehouse. However, in an interview after her elimination, Smithson clarified that it is a drawing of a Japanese Geisha, based on a painting that she owns.

Smithson gave birth to daughter Olivia Mabel Smithson on 30 September 2012.

== Career ==
=== Ultimate High (1999–2001) ===
Before the marriage to her husband Todd Smithson, Smithson (as Carly Hennessy) released an album for MCA Records called Ultimate High in 2001. Despite MCA Records spending over $2 million on the production and promotion of Smithson's debut album, it sold only 378 copies in its first three months. Smithson has stated that the uptempo party record did not have the opportunity to find an audience, due to it being released so soon after the events of 9/11, as well as the record company's untimely merger with a parent company. Though some established artists like Sheryl Crow survived the merger, yet-to-be-released artists did not. In the album, Smithson covered Danielle Brisebois' "Just Missed the Train". Kelly Clarkson covered the same song on her 2003 album, Thankful. After American Idol, Ultimate High was quietly reissued by Universal Music, both to physical and online music retailers. For a brief period after Smithson's elimination, the album peaked in the Top 10 of Amazon's Top Selling Digital Albums, as well as being featured on their MP3 homepage. The album lists conductor Derek Gleeson as its executive producer.

=== American Idol ===
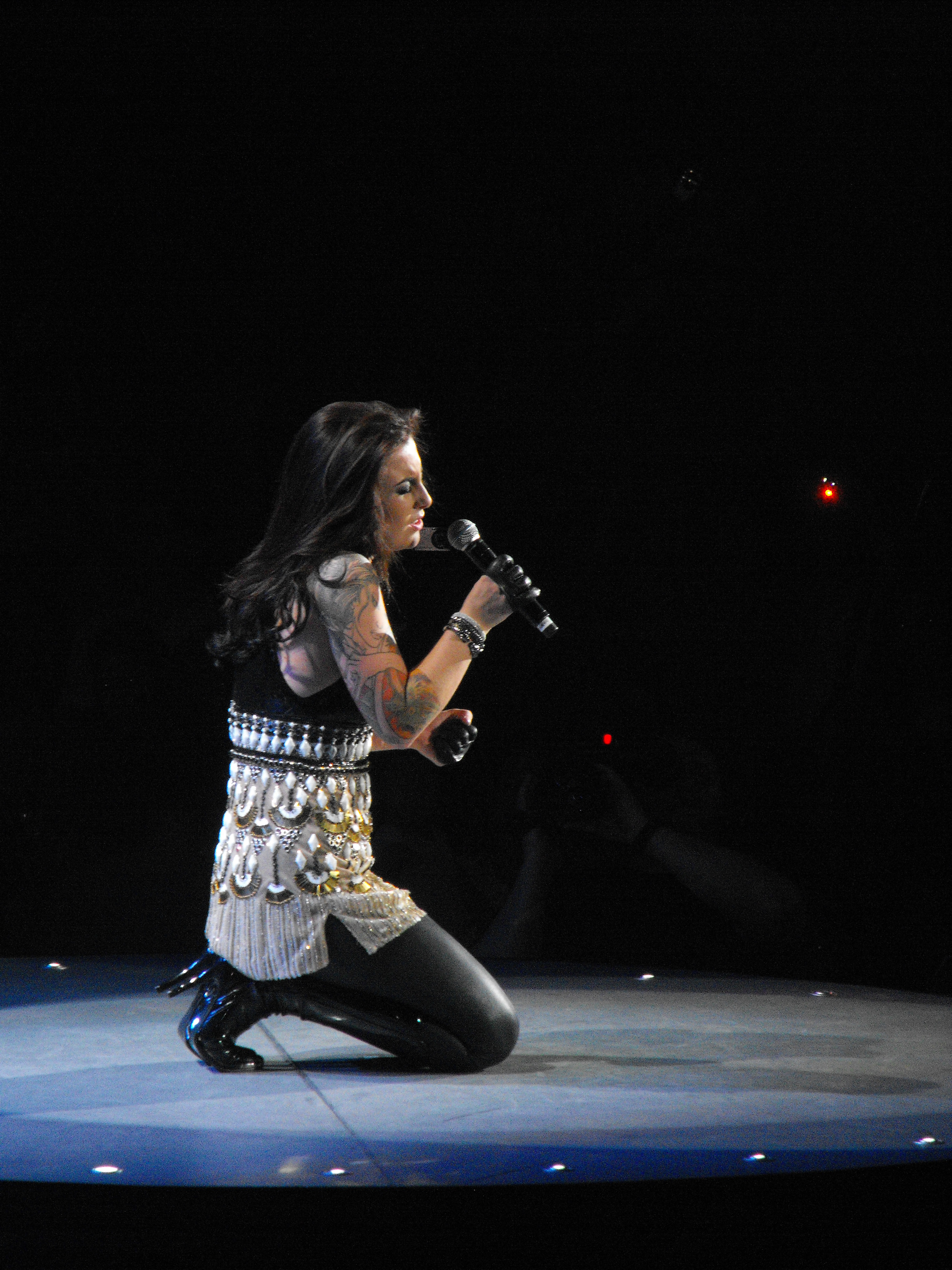
Smithson performing during the American Idols Live! Tour 2008

==== Season 5 ====
Smithson auditioned in Las Vegas, Nevada, for the fifth season of American Idol and was unanimously accepted by the judges. However, she was later disqualified because the paperwork for her work visa was delayed.

==== Season 7 ====
In 2007, Smithson auditioned again for the seventh season of American Idol making it to Hollywood, but this time with the proper paperwork. She advanced with a unanimous vote after singing "I'm Every Woman". Simon Cowell noted that he remembered her from her season 5 audition. In Hollywood, she sang Heart's "Alone" for her audition and once again received a unanimous praise from the judges. Smithson was one of the first foreign contestants to make the show's Top 12 with the other one being Michael Johns who was an Australian. Smithson was eliminated on 23 April 2008. Her final song performance was "Superstar" from Andrew Lloyd Webber's Jesus Christ Superstar. The performance was considered to be one of her best by the judges. The day before she was eliminated Cowell stated, "I thought that was the best performance of the night so far.", prompting Smithson to pull out a T-shirt sent to her by her fans with a sign on it that said "Simon Loves Me (this week)". After it was announced that she was eliminated, Cowell said: "I apologize for giving you a compliment last night—kiss of death, but let me tell you, Carly, you can leave with your head held high".

==== Controversies ====
Shortly after it was announced that Smithson had made the show's Top 24, articles appeared in the mainstream press questioning her selection because of her previous record deal. Randy Jackson also worked for MCA during the same time that Smithson was signed. Despite this, she remained on the show. After her elimination, Smithson briefly acknowledged the situation in interviews. On The Ellen DeGeneres Show, she stated that she felt that she was "kind of singled out" and she added that "The media kind of does what they do and I got a lot of weird and negative press very early on but, you know, I just kind of held my head high and it kind of got forgotten about as the show went on." She adds "You know, a lot of the people had professional careers that were involved and I actually hadn't really had lots of stage experience and a lot of the other people had and I think that's more of the experience that you really need on that show."

Smithson's elimination came as a surprise to viewers as she was considered one of the front-runners on the show. This prompted an unprecedented reaction, with bloggers questioning the popular program's credibility amidst reports from fans of busy signals throughout the voting period. Whitney Pastorek of Entertainment Weekly mockingly called the show "America's Embarrassing Lapses in Judgment", saying "Carly Smithson was sent packing, despite a rendition of 'Jesus Christ Superstar' that Jesus himself would have been hard-pressed to top". There were claims of fixing and calls for the show to publish precise voting totals, resulting in a press release from Fox and the show's producers: "The network and producers will not disclose voting tallies for the competition, as the release of such information would only serve to create additional rumor and speculation", conflicting with executive producer Ken Warwick's claim that they were open to scrutiny, quoted "No one is saying you can't look at them."

==== Performances/results ====
Week #	Theme	Song choice	Original artist	Order #	Result
Audition	N/A	"I'm Every Woman"	Chaka Khan	N/A	Advanced
Hollywood	N/A	"When I Need You"	Leo Sayer	N/A	Advanced
Top 50	N/A	"Alone"	i-TEN	N/A	Advanced
Top 24 (12 Women)	1960s	"The Shadow of Your Smile"	Tony Bennett	12	Safe
Top 20 (10 Women)	1970s	"Crazy on You"	Heart	1	Safe
Top 16 (8 Women)	1980s	"I Drove All Night"	Cyndi Lauper	4	Safe
Top 12	Lennon–McCartney	"Come Together"	The Beatles	5	Safe
Top 11	The Beatles	"Blackbird"	The Beatles	7	Bottom 3^{1}
Top 10	Year they Were Born	"Total Eclipse of the Heart"	Bonnie Tyler	7	Safe
Top 9	Dolly Parton	"Here You Come Again"	Dolly Parton	5	Safe
Top 8	Inspirational Music	"The Show Must Go On"	Queen	6	Bottom 3^{2}
Top 7	Mariah Carey	"Without You"	Badfinger	2	Safe
Top 6	Andrew Lloyd Webber	"Superstar"	Jesus Christ Superstar	5	Eliminated

- ^Note 1: Smithson was saved first from elimination.
- ^Note 2: When revealing the results, Ryan Seacrest simultaneously declared Smithson and Syesha Mercado safe, as Michael Johns was eliminated.

=== Post-Idol ===
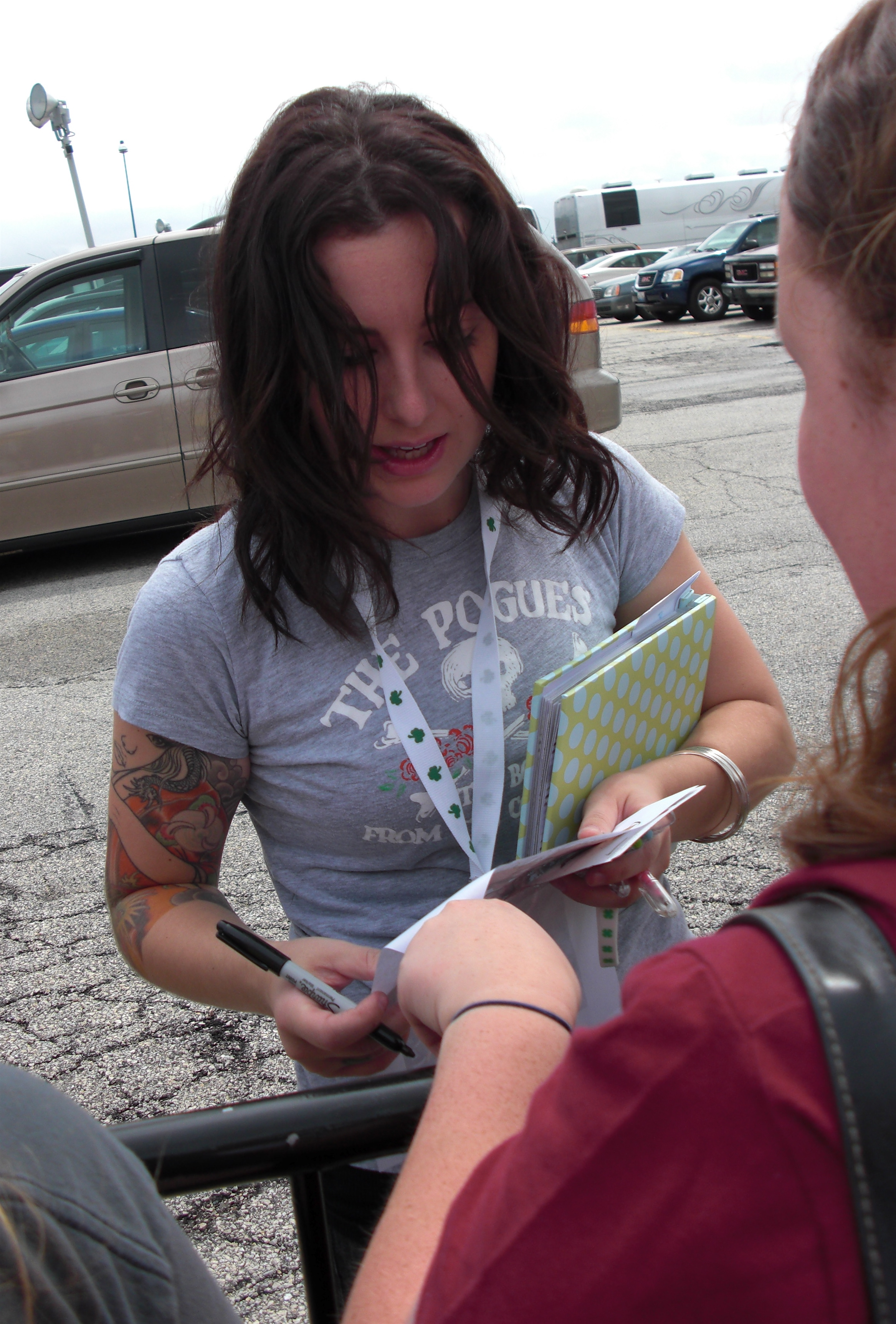
Smithson signing autographs during the American Idols Live! Tour 2008

After she was eliminated from American Idol, Smithson appeared on talk shows, including Live with Regis and Kelly, The Tonight Show with Jay Leno, Access Hollywood, Today and The Ellen DeGeneres Show.

Smithson completed the American Idols LIVE! Tour 2008, which ran from 1 July 2008 to 12 September 2008. She performed "Bring Me to Life" by Evanescence, "Crazy on You" by Heart, and "I Drove All Night" by Cyndi Lauper. Smithson returned to Idol during its eighth season, as a mentor to contestants taking part in Boot Camp Training during "Hollywood Week," although this footage did not appear on the show. Later, during the 18 February 2009 live semi-finals results show, Smithson and fellow season 7 contestant Michael Johns performed "The Letter," a song they had also performed for the Idol Finale the previous season. She also appeared in the season 8 Grand Finale, where she served as a correspondent covering the events of the celebration in San Diego, Adam Lambert's hometown.

Two of Smithson's own original songs, titled "Let Me Fall" and "Lay with Me," were featured in a Los Angeles Times interview video of Carly recording songs for her post-Idol album. In the interview, Smithson revealed that "pop rock" was the sound she had chosen and explained "I don't want to go too hard rock or too pop." Smithson was putting the finishing touches on the album when it was announced on 18 June 2009, that she would be joining forces with Evanescence co-founder Ben Moody in a new band called We Are the Fallen, thought to be named after Evanescence's first album. The solo album Smithson had been recording was reportedly scrapped.

On 28 October 2009, it was announced that We Are the Fallen, along with Smithson, had signed with Universal Republic. The band released their first album on 11 May 2010. After touring and releasing two singles, it was announced that the band was dropped by Universal Republic on 27 May 2011 but that they would not be disbanding.

In December 2010, Smithson began singing with Cirque du Soleil in Viva Elvis. She performed in the Las Vegas production for nearly two years until it closed in August 2012. One month later on 30 September 2012, she gave birth to her first child, a daughter named Olivia Mabel Smithson.

Smithson served as a table judge in the stadium auditions for the fourteenth season of American Idol in Minneapolis, Minnesota, New Orleans, Louisiana, Long Island, New York, and Nashville, Tennessee between 18 June and 30 July 2014. On her Twitter account, Smithson said, "It hurt my soul to not put everyone through. Such amazing people with touching stories. I did however get to put through some huge talent. Honored to have shared a moment that might change somebody's life."

On 7 April 2016, Smithson appeared on American Idol's farewell episode, performing Dolly Parton's "Here You Come Again."

== Discography ==
=== Studio albums ===
Year	Album details	Peak positions		Certifications (sales threshold)
Year	Album details	US	US Digital	Certifications (sales threshold)
2001	Ultimate High: Release date: 13 November 2001; Label: MCA Records	—	—	Sales: 378
"—" denotes releases that did not chart

=== Singles ===
Year	Single	Peak	Album	Sales
Year	Single	US	Album	Sales
2001	"I'm Gonna Blow Your Mind"	—	Ultimate High	Sales: Unavailable
2001	"Beautiful You"	—	Ultimate High	Sales: Unavailable
"—" denotes releases that did not chart

=== We Are the Fallen ===
Year	Album details
2010	Tear the World Down: Released: 11 May 2010; Label: Universal Republic; Peak on US Billboard 200 – No. 33; US Sales: 40,000

== Filmography ==
=== Film ===
Year	Film	Role
1990	Fools of Fortune	Young Marianne

=== Television ===
Year	Film	Role
2010	Hell's Kitchen	Herself
