= Gimme Little Sign =

1967 song by Brenton Wood

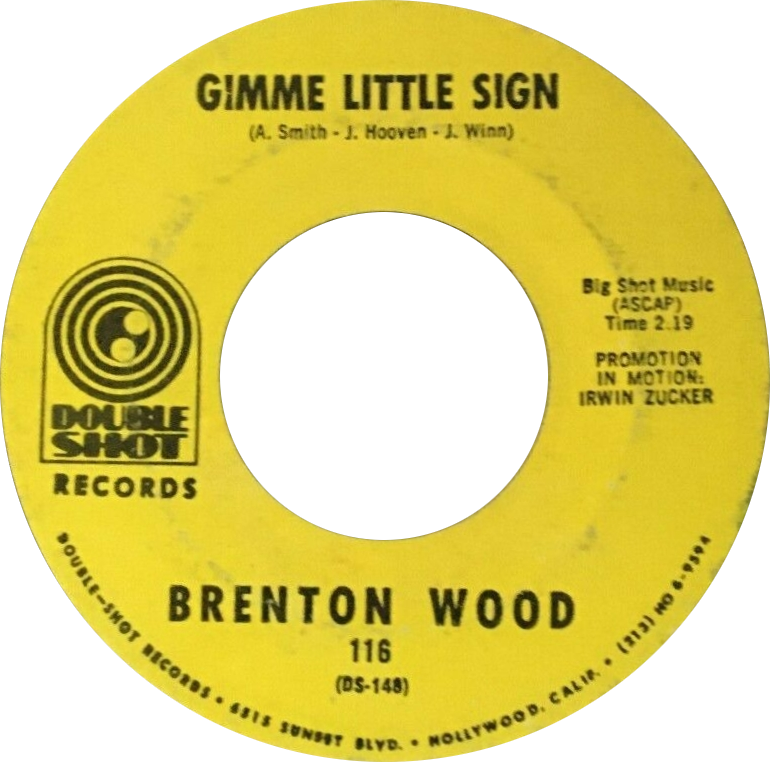
- Side A of the US vinyl single

Single by Brenton Wood

from the album Oogum Boogum
- B-side: "I Think You've Got Your Fools Mixed Up"
- Released: August 1967
- Genre: Soul; R&B
- Length: 2:19
- Label: Double Shot
- Songwriters: Alfred Smith, Joe Hooven, Jerry Winn

Brenton Wood singles chronology
"The Oogum Boogum Song" (1967)	"Gimme Little Sign" (1967)	"Baby You Got It" (1967)

Audio
- "Gimme Little Sign" by Brenton Wood on YouTube

"Gimme Little Sign" is a song by the American R&B musician Brenton Wood. Released as a single in 1967, it was written by Wood (under his real name, Alfred Smith), Joe Hooven and Jerry Winn. The charted versions were by Wood, Peter Andre, the Sattalites, and Danielle Brisebois.

== History ==
The song was released in 1967 on the album Oogum Boogum. Wood's version peaked at number nine on the US Billboard Hot 100 chart the weeks of October 14 and 21, 1967, and also was top 10 in the UK Singles Chart, Australia and Italy (April 1968). Mighty Mo Rodgers played the electronic organ on the recording.

== Charts ==
=== Weekly charts ===
Chart (1967–68)	Peak position
Australia (Go-Set)	8
Australia (Kent Music Report)	4
Belgium (Ultratop 50 Wallonia)	18
Canada (RPM) Top Singles	17
West Germany (GfK)	25
Italy (hitparadeitalia)	1
New Zealand (Listener)	20
UK Singles (OCC)	8
US Billboard Hot 100	9
US Billboard R&B Singles	19
US Cash Box Top 100	7

=== Year-end charts ===
Chart (1967)	Rank
US Billboard Hot 100	28
US Cash Box	63

== Peter Andre version ==
"Gimme Little Sign"

Single by Peter Andre

from the album Peter Andre
- B-side: "Drive Me Crazy" (Crazy Cool Funk mix)
- Released: October 26, 1992
- Length: 3:28
- Label: Melodian
- Songwriters: Smith, Hooven, Winn
- Producers: Phil Harding, Ian Curnow

Peter Andre singles chronology
"Drive Me Crazy" (1992)	"Gimme Little Sign" (1992)	"Funky Junky" (1993)

Music video
- "Gimme Little Sign" by Peter Andre on YouTube

"Gimme Little Sign" was covered by Australian artist Peter Andre and released as the second single from his self-titled debut album. The single was released on October 26, 1992, through Melodian Records. The single peaked at number three on the Australian Singles Chart, achieving platinum status. It was the 12th highest-selling single of 1993 in Australia and went on to win an ARIA Award in 1993 for highest-selling Australian Single of the Year.

=== Track listings ===
CD1 and cassette single

1. "Gimme Little Sign" (single version) – 3:28
2. "Gimme Little Sign" (Tony & Asha's mix) – 6:29

CD2

1. "Gimme Little Sign" (single version) – 3:28
2. "Gimme Little Sign" (Tony & Asha's mix) – 6:29
3. "Gimme Little Sign" (Phil & Ian's 12-inch mix) – 5:57
4. "Gimme Little Sign" (demonstration version) – 3:25
5. "Drive Me Crazy" (Crazy Cool Funk mix) – 6:34

=== Charts ===
==== Weekly charts ====
Chart (1993)	Peak position
Australia (ARIA)	3

==== Year-end charts ====
Chart (1993)	Rank
Australia (ARIA)	12

=== Certifications ===
Region	Certification	Certified units/sales
Australia (ARIA)	Platinum	100,000

== Other cover versions ==
Syl Johnson's version, heard in his 1979 album Uptown Shakedown, was mentioned by Billboard as one of the album's highlights alongside "Mystery Lady" and "Who's Gonna Love You".

The Sattalites's version, titled "Gimme Some Kinda Sign", in June 1988 peaked at number 44 on Canada's RPM 100 Singles chart and number nine on RPM Adult Contemporary chart. The single's B-side track is "Lively Ivy". When UB40 covered the song in 2024 as the first single from their UB45 album, they also titled it "Gimme Some Kinda Sign", with the single becoming a top ten hit on Talking Pictures TV's Heritage Chart.

Danielle Brisebois's version, released as the second single from her 1994 album Arrive All over You, peaked at number 75 on the UK chart on the week ending September 3, 1995, at number 51 on German singles chart on the week ending April 24, 1995, and at number 23 on the Swedish chart. The music video of the Brisebois version was directed by Kate Garner and Paul Archard. Other tracks of the single are "Just Missed the Train" and "Ain't Gonna Cry No More".

Shawn Colvin included a cover of "Gimme Little Sign" on her 2015 album Uncovered. Singer-songwriter Marc Cohn provided "harmonies on a smoulderingly intimate, country soul arrangement ... underpinned by laid back hand percussion."

Roberto Jordán's Spanish cover version, "Hazme una señal", heard in his 1968 album of the same name was published by RCA-Victor. This album was a compendium of many covers, such as "Susana" ("Susan" - The Buckinghams), "Soy un creyente" (I'm A Believer - The Monkees), "Palabras" ("Words" - Bee Gees), "Como te quiero" ("Birds Of A Feather" - Joe South), "El Juego de Simón" ("Simon Says" - 1910 Fruitgum Company), "Juntos esta noche" ("Let's Spend The Night Together" - Rolling Stones), "Muchacha Bonita" ("Cry Like a Baby" - The Box Tops), "Juntos y felices" ("Happy Together" - The Turtles), "La chica de los ojos cafés" ("Brown Eyed Girl" - Van Morrison).
