= Cover Drive discography =

- Studio albums: 2
- Singles: 11
- Music videos: 8
- Featured singles: 1

The discography of the Bajan four-piece band Cover Drive consists of two studio albums, twelve singles (including one as a featured artist) and eight music videos.

Cover Drive gained many subscribers on YouTube with videos of the band covering popular songs. In April 2011, the band signed a publishing deal with Sony and a recording deal with Polydor Records. After the band were signed, they began writing and recording material for their debut album. Whilst in the studio, they met American producer J. R. Rotem who produced their debut single, "Lick Ya Down", which was released in August 2011. After receiving heavy airplay on both the radio and music channels in the United Kingdom, the song peaked at number nine on the UK Singles Chart. They later released their second single, "Twilight" in January 2012, which became their first single to chart in Ireland, peaking at number 30. The song reached number one on in the UK. In April 2012, "Sparks" was released as the third single from the album, peaking at number four in the UK. The following month, the band released their debut album, "Bajan Style", which debuted at number 14 on the UK Albums Chart. In August 2012, they released "Explode" as the fourth single, featuring British grime artist, Dappy. It reached number 29 on the UK Singles Chart. Cover Drive are a four-piece band from Barbados consisting of Amanda Reifer, T-Ray Armstrong, Barry "Bar-Man" Hill and Jamar Harding. They have gained commercial success in the United Kingdom. "Lovesick Riddim" was announced as their lead single from their EP, Liming In Limbo on 13 December 2013 which was given to fans as a taster of what's to come. The group's highly anticipated second album will be released on late 2014. The lead single, Love Junkie is released on 27 July (UK/Europe) and 29 July (US/Rest of world).

== Studio albums ==
Title	Details	Peak chart positions		
Title	Details	IRE	SCO	UK
Bajan Style	Released: 7 May 2012; Label: Polydor Records; Formats: CD, digital download	99	28	14
Fall Forward	Released: 10 April 2017; Label: Mumstrong Entertainment; Formats: CD, digital download	—	—	—

== Extended plays ==
Title	Details
Liming in Limbo	Released: 13 December 2013; Label: Self-released; Formats: digital download

== Singles ==
=== As lead artist ===
Title	Year	Peak chart positions					Album
Title	Year	BEL	IRE	SCO	UK	JPN	Album
"Lick Ya Down"	2011	—	—	11	9	—	Bajan Style
"Twilight"	2012	120	30	3	1	60	Bajan Style
"Sparks"	2012	—	29	5	4	—	Bajan Style
"Explode" (featuring Dappy)	2012	—	27	27	29	—	Bajan Style
"All My Love"	2013	—	—	—	—	—	Non-album single
"Lovesick Riddim"	2013	—	—	—	—	—	Liming In Limbo
"Dis Ain't Love"	2014	—	—	—	—	—	Non-album singles
"Love Junkie"	2014	—	—	—	—	—	Non-album singles
"No One Knows"	2014	—	—	—	—	—	Non-album singles
"Grapefruit Perrier"	2016	—	—	—	—	—	Fall Forward
"Breakdown"	2017	—	—	—	—	—	Fall Forward
"—" denotes items which were not released in that country or failed to chart.

=== As featured artist ===
Title	Year	Peak chart positions										Album
Title	Year	AUS	BEL	DEN	FRA	IRE	NL	NOR	NZ	SWE	UK	Album
"Turn Up the Love" (Far East Movement featuring Cover Drive)	2012	8	78	35	26	14	19	20	8	23	13	Dirty Bass

== Music videos ==
Title	Year	Director	Ref
"Lick Ya Down"	2011	Syndrome	
"Twilight"	2011	Syndrome	
"Sparks"	2012	Declan Whitebloom	
"Turn Up the Love"	2012	Matt Alonzo	
"Explode"	2012	Marcus Lundin	
"All My Love"	2013	Jamie Alderson	
"Lovesick Riddim"	2013	Cover Drive	
"Love Junkie"	2014	Jahket	
