= Loving the Sound =

Single by The Overtones

from the album Higher
- Released: 14 September 2012
- Recorded: 2012
- Genre: Pop
- Length: 3:13
- Label: Warner Music Group
- Songwriter(s): Jon Green • Phil Thornalley

The Overtones singles chronology
"Say What I Feel" (2011)	"Loving the Sound" (2012)	"Higher" (2012)

"Loving the Sound" is the first single from five-piece British-Irish doo-wop boy band The Overtones to be released from their second studio album, Higher (2012). The single was released in the United Kingdom as a digital download on 14 September 2012.

== Music video ==
A music video to accompany the release of "Loving the Sound" was first released onto YouTube on 3 September 2012 at a total length of three minutes and twenty-eight seconds.

== Live performances ==
On 29 September 2012 the band performed the song on Red or Black? as part of a three-song medley. They also performed the song on This Morning.

== Track listing ==
Digital download
No.	Title	Length
1.	"Loving the Sound"	3:13

== Chart performance ==
Chart (2012)	Peak position
UK Singles (The Official Charts Company)	100

== Release history ==
Region	Date	Format	Label
United Kingdom	14 September 2012	Digital Download	Warner Music Group
