= Higher (The Overtones album) =

Studio album by The Overtones
- Released: 1 October 2012
- Recorded: 2011–2012
- Studio: Thesamplefactory, London; Sarm Studios, Notting Hill, London; Capitol Recording Studios, Hollywood, CA; WallyWorld Studios, Studio City, CA; Northern Sky Studios
- Genre: Pop; doo-wop; soul
- Length: 37:18
- Label: Rhino Entertainment
- Producer: Trevor Horn; Future Cut; Walter Afanasieff; Steve Robson; Steve Booker

The Overtones chronology
Good Ol' Fashioned Love (2011)	Higher (2012)	Saturday Night at the Movies (2013)

Singles from Higher
- 1. "Loving the Sound" Released: 14 September 2012; 2. "Higher" Released: 30 November 2012; 3. "Love Song" Released: 18 February 2013

Higher is the second studio album by the five-piece British-Irish doo-wop boy band The Overtones. The album was released on 1 October 2012 in the UK via Rhino Entertainment. The album was preceded by the release of the lead single, "Loving the Sound". The band worked with a number of well-known producers on the album, including Trevor Horn, Walter Afanasieff and Steve Robson, as well as production team Future Cut, who produced most of the original tracks on the album.

== Promotion ==
On 29 September 2012 the band appeared on an episode of Red or Black?, appearing as part of a challenge involving using a handkerchief in their performance. They performed three songs in a medley, including the album's lead single "Loving the Sound". On 9 December 2012 they appeared as special guest performers in the final episode of the ninth series of The Xtra Factor. Despite not being a single from the album, "Runaround Sue" has been a staple of the band's live set since its inception and is one of the crowd favourites on tour. On 4 October 2012, Higher entered the Irish Albums Chart at #19, before entering the UK Albums Chart at #6 two days later, becoming the band's second top ten album in the UK.

== Singles ==
- "Loving the Sound" was released as the lead single from the album on 14 September 2012. It charted at 100 on the Official UK Charts on 7 October 2012 and became their second top 100 single to date. The band promoted the song with performances on The National Lottery, This Morning and The Xtra Factor.
- "Higher" was released as the second single from the album on 30 November 2012. It was the second original song to be released as a single from the album. The track was co-written by the band and Steve Booker and produced by Future Cut.
- "Love Song" was released as the third and final single from the album on 18 February 2013. It was the third original song to be released as a single from the album. The track was again co-written by the band and produced by Future Cut.

== Track listing ==
No.	Title	Writer(s)	Producer(s)	Length
1.	"Loving the Sound"	Jon Green; Phil Thornalley	Future Cut	3:13
2.	"Perfect"	Mark E. Nevin	Trevor Horn	3:36
3.	"Call Me Up"	Marco Bernardis; Paul Martin Burton; Michael Craig Davis; Edvard Førre Erfjord; Mark Franks; Henrik B. Michelsen; Timmy Matley	Future Cut	3:09
4.	"Runaround Sue"	Dion DiMucci; Ernie Maresca	Horn	3:05
5.	"When You Say My Name"	Lachie Chapman; Wayne Hector; Matley; Steve Robson	Robson	3:11
6.	"Groovin'"	Eddie Brigati; Felix Cavaliere	Walter Afanasieff	4:12
7.	"Unforgettable"	Irving Gordon	Afanasieff	3:33
8.	"Love Song"	Bernardis; Burton; Chapman; Mike Crawshaw; Davis; Erfjord; Darren Everest; Franks; Matley; Michelsen	Future Cut	3:26
9.	"The Glory of Love"	Billy Hill	Afanasieff	2:10
10.	"You've Lost That Lovin' Feelin'"	Barry Mann; Phil Spector; Cynthia Weil	Horn	4:34
11.	"Reet Petite"	Tyran Carlo; Berry Gordy	Horn	2:42
12.	"You Keep Me Hangin' On"	Holland–Dozier–Holland	Horn	3:25
13.	"Higher"	Steve Booker; Chapman; Crawshaw; Everest; Franks; Matley	Future Cut	3:50

== Charts ==
=== Weekly charts ===
Chart (2012)	Peak position
Irish Albums (IRMA)	19
Scottish Albums (OCC)	9
UK Albums (OCC)	6

=== Year-end charts ===
Chart (2012)	Position
UK Albums (OCC)	133

== Release history ==
Region	Date	Format	Label
United Kingdom	1 October 2012	CD, Digital download	Rhino Entertainment
