= Nick Southwood =

British songwriter and record producer

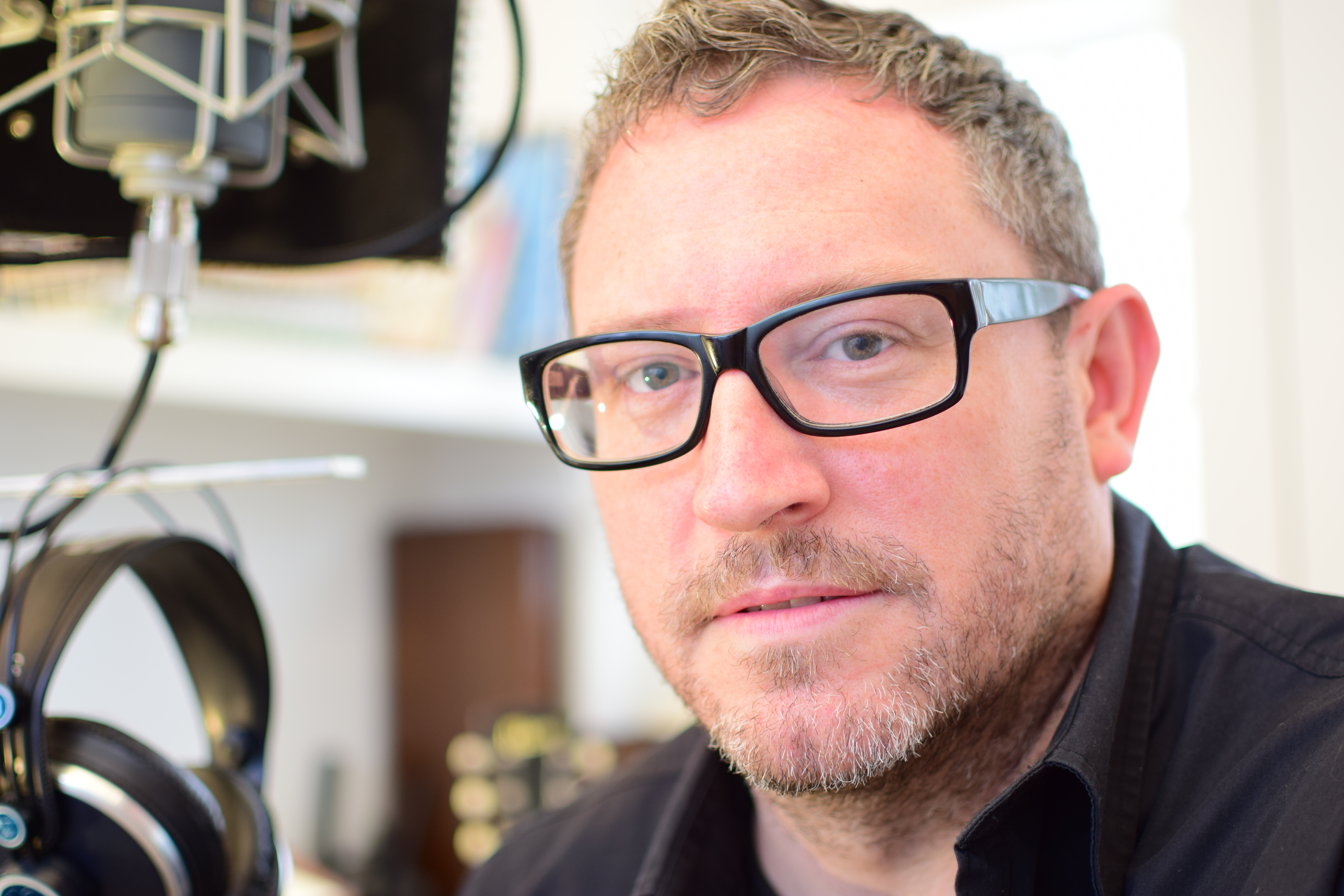

Background information
- Occupations: Songwriter, producer, musician
- Website: nicksouthwoodproductions.com

Nick Southwood is a British songwriter, musician and producer best known for his contribution to "Lost Stars", which is featured in the 2014 film Begin Again soundtrack. He is also known for his songwriting and production work with The Overtones.

== Lost Stars ==
"Lost Stars" is an original song performed by Maroon 5 singer-songwriter Adam Levine for the musical romantic comedy-drama film Begin Again. It was released on 30 June 2014 through ALXNDR (a rising musical group), 222 Records, Polydor, and Interscope in the United States. "Lost Stars" was written by Gregg Alexander, Danielle Brisebois, Nick Lashley and Nick Southwood. The song was recorded at the Electric Lady Studios in New York City during the summer of 2012. The Adam Levine main version is produced by Gregg Alexander, Nick Lashley and Nick Southwood with vocals produced and arranged by Danielle Brisebois.

== The Overtones ==
Southwood arranged and produced The Overtones' first album Good Ol' Fashioned Love. He co-wrote the single "Gambling Man" with the band. Southwood also has production and engineering credits on The Overtone's third album Saturday Night at the Movies.
