= Red or Black? =

British television game show (2011–2012)

- Created by: Simon Cowell
- Presented by: Ant & Dec
- Composer: Biffco
- Country of origin: United Kingdom
- Original language: English
- No. of series: 2
- No. of episodes: 14

Production
- Running time: 30–75 minutes (2011); 45 minutes (2012)
- Production companies: Syco Entertainment; ITV Studios

Original release
- Network: ITV
- Release: 3 September 2011 – 29 September 2012

Related
- The X Factor; Britain's Got Talent

Red or Black? is a British television game show which was broadcast on ITV between 3 September 2011 and 29 September 2012.

In each round, contestants choose red or black, with those that choose the incorrect colour being eliminated. During the first series, four finalists guessed the colour correctly in the final round and became millionaires. Over 100,000 members of the public applied to be on the show, with the numbers being reduced down to a different final eight contestants per live show each night for seven nights. Whilst most rounds varied, there were two standard rounds in each live final: "Duel" where the final two contestants went head to head, and the final round where the winner chose a colour on a giant wheel similar to that used in roulette. Celebrities including Jedward, David Hasselhoff and One Direction were involved in the rounds of the show where contestants must choose either red or black in order to pass to the next round, while the show was filmed at locations such as Battersea Power Station and the set of Coronation Street.

Red or Black? was commissioned for a second series, which featured the format having been revamped significantly. While the first series featured six pre-recorded rounds in several different locations and four live rounds, the second series featured six pre-recorded rounds that take place in either the Red or Black? Arena or in the studio. Celebrities such as Carol Vorderman, Jonathan Ross and Little Mix were involved in the rounds for this series.

The show is a joint production between Syco TV and ITV Studios, and was initially broadcast on ITV nightly over the course of seven nights from Saturday to the following Saturday, with the exception of the Tuesday night. The show also featured several Syco-related music acts. Sponsorship for the first series was initially targeted at National Lottery operator Camelot Group, but eventually went with Jackpotjoy owner Gamesys and Domino's Pizza. The second series was sponsored by controversial loans site wonga.com.

In the week where the first series of Red or Black? aired, ITV gained a much larger audience share than it had in the week directly previous, where it had been beaten by BBC One on six out of seven nights. Despite this, reviews of the first series were universally negative, and additional criticism was leveled at the show when it was discovered that Nathan Hageman, the first winner of the £1m prize, had a criminal record. This led to ITV dropping three other contestants from the show, with at least one withdrawn because of their criminal record. This was also a major factor in the pre-recording of series 2.

== Production ==
An initial pilot of the show was ordered in 2003 by ITV, from production company FremantleMedia, and was commissioned by Claudia Rosencrantz, who was the controller of entertainment at ITV at the time. It was presented by Brian Conley, but was not broadcast; a series was not produced. Rosencrantz spoke of the pilot in 2011, "I didn't believe people would like to see someone win a vast sum of money, with no skills at all involved. Second, gambling is not a spectator sport, you get an adrenaline rush from participating in it." Richard Holloway, who worked with FremantleMedia at the time of producing the pilot, said, "It was a novel idea, you could win a million pounds eventually, I was surprised it didn't go to series." Rosencrantz left ITV in 2006, and there has been a significant turnover in staff since the pilot was originally put together.

The show was launched by ITV and Syco at the Millennium Hotel Mayfair, London, on 3 May 2011. The initial recruitment phase for contestants lasted until 13 May. The updated format was conceived by Simon Cowell, who said that it was inspired by roulette and the story of Ashley Revell, who had bet his entire life savings on "red" in a roulette game in Las Vegas. It is the most expensive game show in history, at around £1.5m per episode. ITV's director of entertainment and comedy, Elaine Bedell, was contacted by Cowell, "This being Simon this was at 1.30 am, but even then it was quite a compelling idea". When later talking about the £1m prize on offer each night, Cowell said, "It's expensive if you have to give away a million every night but we have insurance for that."

Being a co-production between Syco TV and ITV Studios, Cowell began planning for international versions straight away, saying, "I'd love to take it around the world. I think the concept works. If it succeeds it will travel. We've got interest in America already." Some Syco-managed acts appeared on the show, including Leona Lewis on the first episode.

Domino's Pizza was announced as the primary sponsor of the show in June 2011, in a deal worth £1m. It had previously been the sponsor of Britain's Got Talent for three years. National Lottery operator Camelot Group were originally sought after to be the primary sponsors, but did not go ahead. A Camelot spokesperson said, "We were approached by Syco and worked with them and ITV on the Red or Black? concept. However, after discussions, we didn't reach an agreement on the venture."

ITV also signed deals with Jackpotjoy owner Gamesys to produce pay-to-play games for their website on an exclusive basis. Social TV company Monterosa were contracted to create a game that could be played by viewers online whilst watching the show, also allowing viewers to compete with their Facebook friends. Achievement badges could be unlocked by players, and if they managed to get through all ten rounds correctly, then they were awarded entry into the Red or Black? Millionaire's Club, normally reserved for those competitors who won the prize money themselves. Cowell stated in an interview during the broadcast week of the first series that he hoped a second series would go ahead, and that he had received three separate approaches from the United States to create an American version. Peter Fincham, ITV's chief programmer, said in October 2011 that Red or Black? would only be recommissioned for a second series if some changes were made to the format.

Series 2 of Red or Black? was announced by Ant & Dec on 30 March 2012 during a radio programme appearance on The Chris Moyles Show. To satisfy regulators and reduce production costs, producers introduced a brand-new end game called "The Vortex." The stakes remained high, featuring a rolling jackpot that started at £500,000 and added another £500,000 to the prize pool every time a contestant failed to win it.

== Series 1 ==
=== Format ===
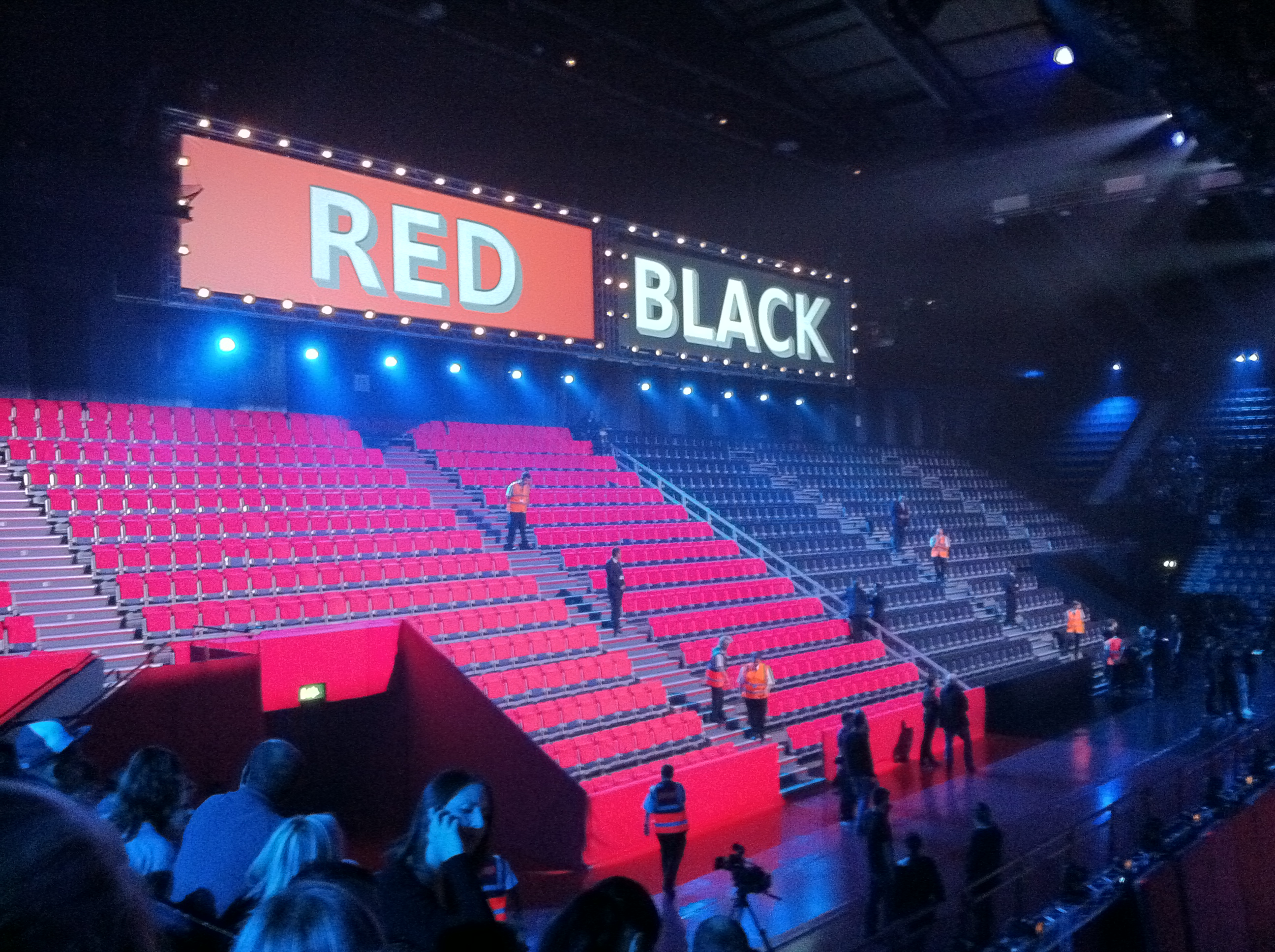
The Red and Black seating areas where contestants picked a colour at the Red or Black? Arena in series 1

Each episode of series 1 of Red or Black? consisted of 10 rounds; in each round, the player had to choose either red or black, with those who choose incorrectly being eliminated. The rounds were split into three stages. The first is an arena stage, which is recorded at Wembley Arena, which was named the "Red or Black Arena" during the show. 1,000 contenders are shown the beginning of a spectacular stunt with either a red or a black competitor as the winning outcome, and then have to decide which side will win. To do so, they take a seat at one of two special stands (Red or Black). The contenders who have correctly guessed the winner are given a fortune cookie - 256 of these cookies contain coloured stripes, with 128 of them being red, the other ones being black. After one of these colours gets selected, the players with the winning stripes (128 in total) move onto the location stage, where four more stunts will be shown, with the players have to guess the outcome of each of these stunts. After each of the four games, the field of players will be cut in half. This means that, after the fourth location game, only eight competitors are left. Those eight then go forward to the live studio final, where they are reduced down to the last two players over the course of two more games after each of which half of the players have to go. The two remaining players after both games moved on to the second part of the show. The second part always included the same two games: the "Duel" with the final two contestants and the last round in which the winning contestant gets to play for the million pound prize. The first series was broadcast over seven nights in September 2011, running over the course of a week, except for the Tuesday night, from Saturday to the following Saturday. Over 100,000 people applied to compete in the show.

In the penultimate round, "Duel", a video wall displayed a disc split into eight sections, numbered 1–8. Before the round started, an independent adjudicator randomised which sections were coloured red or black, with each colour having four sections; this choice was hidden to the contestants. A random player chose their colour, while the other player took the remaining colour. Each player then took it in turns to choose a number, with the corresponding section being revealed to the players and the audience. The first player to have all four of their sections revealed progressed to the final round.

The final game was a giant modified roulette wheel split into 36 alternately coloured sections (18 red and 18 black), awarding a £1 million prize if the player chose the correct colour. Red or Black? made its first millionaire in the first show, with bricklayer Nathan Hageman, from Reading, winning on red. The following night the second millionaire was made, with carer Kevin Cartwright also winning on red. Two further millionaires, Darren Thompson (show 5, winning on black) and Gary Brocklesby (show 6, winning on red), were made during the series. That means that four millionaires were made over the course of seven shows.

==== Rounds ====
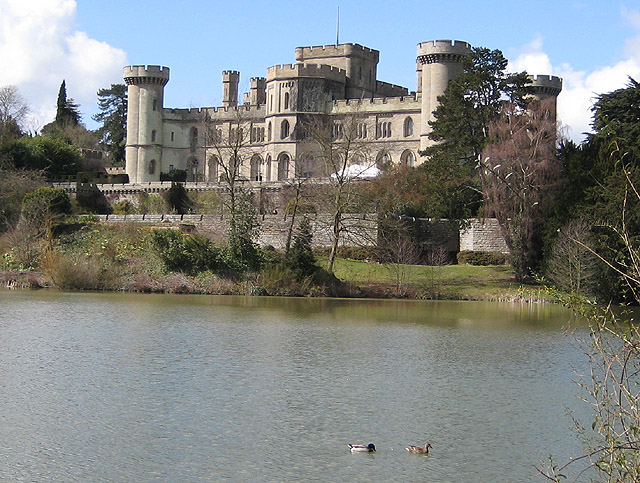
Eastnor Castle, Herefordshire, where Rory McIlroy and Lee Westwood attempted to hit a gong in the middle of a lake

Rounds included golfers Rory McIlroy and Lee Westwood, who were attempting to hit a gong in the middle of a lake from a distance of 100 yards (91 m) near Eastnor Castle, Herefordshire; Jedward being launched in zorbing balls from JCBs; and boxers Amir Khan and David Haye competing in a round called "Shadowboxing". Location filming has taken place on the set of Coronation Street, where there was an issue with a round called "Fit to Burst" featuring actresses Michelle Keegan and Samia Smith who were spinning a wheel in order to burst balloons on a spike. Keegan won the round for her colour, but was subsequently disqualified for taking her hand off the wheel's handle, resulting in Smith winning for black. Other locations have included Alnwick Castle, Northumberland, and Battersea Power Station, where David Hasselhoff was fired into the air on a reverse bungee.

=== Episodes ===
The coloured backgrounds denote the result of each of the shows:

– indicates the contestant won the whole show and chose the right colour in the final round and won £1 million.
– indicates the contestant won the whole show but chose the wrong colour in the final round.

Episode	Date	Winner (Colour)	Runner-up	Special guests	Guest performance	Location^{[A]}	Overnight ratings (millions)	Official ratings (millions)
1	3 September 2011	Nathan Hageman (Red)	Angel McKenzie	David Hasselhoff and Louis Walsh	Leona Lewis – "Collide"	Battersea Power Station	(Part 1) 6.41 (Part 2) 6.93	(Part 1) 6.71 (Part 2) 7.08
2	4 September 2011	Kevin Cartwright (Red)	Ian Westbury	Rory McIlroy, Lee Westwood, David Haye and Amir Khan	Pixie Lott – "All About Tonight"	Eastnor Castle	(Part 1) 4.47 (Part 2) 5.55	(Part 1) 4.52 (Part 2) 5.45
3	5 September 2011	Ian Murphy (Red)	Sheree Lee	Cesc Fàbregas, Robin van Persie, Jenson Button, David Coulthard and Il Divo	Il Divo	Taffs Well quarry	(Part 1) 5.02 (Part 2) 4.99	(Part 1) 5.07 (Part 2) 4.92
4	7 September 2011	Andy Morton (Black)	Jackie Harvey	Leo Houlding and Fighting Gravity	JLS – "She Makes Me Wanna"	Thorpe Park	(Part 1) 4.65 (Part 2) 4.46	(Part 1) 4.51 (Part 2) 4.32
5	8 September 2011	Darren Thompson (Black)	Hannah Shead	Andrew Flintoff, Michael Vaughan and Diversity	Diversity	Alnwick Castle	(Part 1) 3.81 (Part 2) 3.86	(Part 1) 3.83 (Part 2) 3.88
6	9 September 2011	Gary Brocklesby (Red)	Dave Hall	Professor Splash and Jessie J	Jessie J – "Who's Laughing Now"	Roundhay Park	(Part 1) 3.80 (Part 2) 3.90	(Part 1) 3.81 (Part 2) 3.95
7	10 September 2011	Gary Upton (Red)	Vikki Guy	Jedward, Michelle Keegan, Samia Smith and One Direction	One Direction – "What Makes You Beautiful"	Coronation Street (rounds 3 and 6), Manchester (rounds 4 and 5).	(Part 1) 4.43 (Part 2) 5.67	(Part 1) 4.52 (Part 2) 5.61

== Series 2 ==
=== Format ===
In series 2, the format consists of six rounds with eight contestants. This time, they do not have to choose their colour prior to the start of a round and can hold their nerve. In each of the first three rounds, the eight contestants watch a series of stunts, sporting challenges or performances. They'll then use their judgement to predict the outcome or have their powers of observation tested. Either way, the contestants must strike their buzzer and pick either red or black.

The first game takes place in the Red or Black? arena and subsequent games are held in the studio. After the first three rounds, the four players with the highest scores will move on to Part 2. If a tie occurs, the two or more players will play a tiebreaker round, "Power Bar", to decide who will move onto the second show.

The four remaining contestants participate in the next round, which involves celebrities (often singers). Then, the final two players will move on to the "Duel", played as it was during the first series, with the exception that the randomisation of each segment's colours is now shown briefly before being covered; and the game board now consists of 10 segments instead of 8. The competing pair will have to memorise the position of the jumbled up segments, then take it in turns to find their colour. The first to have all five of their colour revealed is the winner and advances to the new final round, "The Vortex".

The Vortex is "a true test of skill, nerve and judgment". It consists of a "mini velodrome" which flashes between red and black at a constant rate. The aim is to watch the sequence and adjust the power of the launcher, which will fire a ball into The Vortex. If the balls lands in the End Zone in the contestant's chosen colour, they win the jackpot (starting at £500,000), or else it will increase by £500,000 for the next show. the highest would be £3.5 million.

==== Rounds ====
Episode	Game 1	Game 2	Game 3	Game 4	Game 5	Game 6
1	Breakthrough	Wild Card	Cover Drive performance	Spell Check^{1}	Duel	The Vortex
2	Strike Out	Hands Down	Roses^{2}	Little Mix performance	Duel	The Vortex
3	Pole to Pole	Sharp Shooters	Ashleigh and Pudsey performance	Spin-off^{3}	Duel	The Vortex
4	Kick Start	Caught Out	Head Trip	Ronan Keating performance	Duel	The Vortex
5	High Wire	Speed Darts^{4}	Flawless and The English National Ballet	Nelly Furtado performance	Duel	The Vortex
6	Flyball	Breakout	Jonathan & Charlotte featuring Only Boys Aloud performance	Long Shot	Duel	The Vortex
7	Lights Out	Rapid Fire	The Overtones performance	Shadow Boxing	Duel	The Vortex

Notes

- ^Note 1: 'Spell Check' featured Jonathan Ross and Carol Vorderman as participants
- ^Note 2: 'Roses' featured a dance performance by Derek Hough and Peta Murgatroyd
- ^Note 3: 'Spin-off' featured Rizzle Kicks' performance of "Down with the Trumpets"
- ^Note 4: 'Speed Darts' was played by Adrian Lewis and Phil Taylor

=== Episodes ===
The coloured backgrounds denote the result of each of the shows:

– indicates the contestant won the whole show, chose the right colour in the final round and won the Jackpot.
– indicates the contestant won the whole show but chose the wrong colour in the final round.
– indicates a decision was reversed regarding the final round.

Episode	Date	Winner and colour	Runner-up	Special guests	Guest performance	Jackpot	Overnight ratings (millions)	Official ratings (millions)
1	18 August 2012	Sophie Shaw (Red)	Jeannette Newton	Jonathan Ross, Carol Vorderman, Reuben de Jong, Mike O'Hearn, Javier Jarquin and Rick Smith Jr.	Cover Drive – "Twilight" & "Explode"	£500,000	(Part 1) 3.25 (Part 2) 3.59	(Part 1) 3.22 (Part 2) 3.69
2	25 August 2012	Chris Fryer (Black)*	Jemma	Bobby Zamora, Darren Bent, Derek Hough, Peta Murgatroyd, Milos, Sally Miller and Lisa Whitmore	Little Mix – "Wings"	£500,000	(Part 1) 3.42 (Part 2) 3.70	(Part 1) 3.33 (Part 2) 3.74
3	1 September 2012	Beth Andrew (Red)	Howard	Ashleigh and Pudsey, Judd Trump, Neil Robertson, Anthony Hughes, David Mott, Lukas Brown-John with Darren Brown & Brian Bartow with Sammy Bisbey	Rizzle Kicks – "Down with the Trumpets"	£1,000,000	(Part 1) 3.30 (Part 2) 3.06	(Part 1) 3.27 (Part 2) 3.06
4	8 September 2012	Graham Fletcher (Black)	Aarron Stafford	Kevin Pietersen, Mark Ramprakash, Sun Xi Zhong, Dougie Lampkin and Jack Sheppard	Ronan Keating – "Fires"	£1,500,000	(Part 1) 3.17 (Part 2) 3.63	(Part 1) 3.09 (Part 2) 3.62
5	15 September 2012	Christine Stalker (Red)	Tony Crissholi	Flawless, The English National Ballet, Adrian Lewis, Phil Taylor, Harry Cloudfoot and Alun Freem	Nelly Furtado – "Big Hoops (Bigger the Better)"	£500,000	(Part 1) 3.29 (Part 2) 3.35	(Part 1) 2.99 (Part 2) 3.14
6	22 September 2012	Al Sawyer (Black)	Barbara McDowall	Manu Tuilagi, Sam Warburton, Paul Casey, Melissa Reid, The High Flyers and Live Wires	Jonathan & Charlotte featuring Only Boys Aloud – "The Prayer"	£500,000	(Part 1) 3.39 (Part 2) 3.23	(Part 1) 3.77 (Part 2) 3.03
7	29 September 2012	Kris Danns (Red)	Graeme Barram	James DeGale, Carl Froch, Ray De Haan, Stephanie Carey, Zara Python and Silvio Simac	The Overtones – "Stop Me", "Are You Lonely for Me" & "Beggin'"	£1,000,000	(Part 1) 3.23 (Part 2) 2.84	N/A (Under 3.01)

* Chris's loss on the Vortex was reversed after a review of a smaller camera underneath the Vortex that showed the ball dropping and landing milliseconds before the change in colour to red, thus the money was awarded to him – also note that the rollover still stood.

== Reception ==
=== Ratings ===
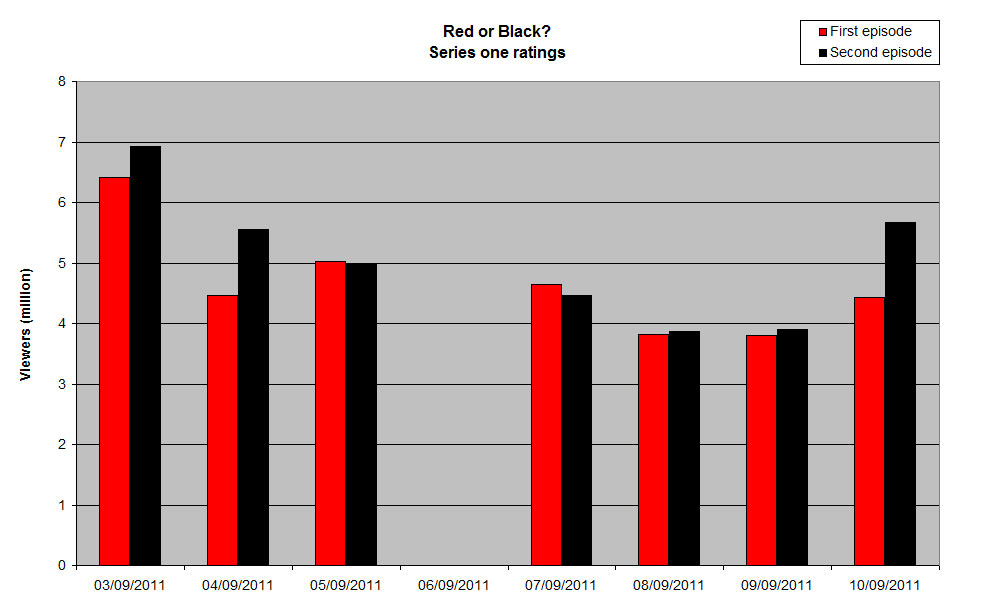
A graph showing the trend in ratings for the first series of Red or Black?

==== Series 1 ====
In the week prior to the launch of Red or Black?, ITV had slipped behind Channel 5 in the ratings on the Sunday night while BBC One had nearly three times the audience share of the ITV channel. While the lead was not as large on the remainder of the evenings, BBC One still beat ITV every night on the overall primetime audience share, except for Thursday night.

Red or Black? launched on Saturday 3 September 2011, with 6.41 million viewers, giving the show a 29.8% share of the market between 7 pm and 8:15 pm, beating the Doctor Who episode "Night Terrors" into second place with 5.54m. It returned later in the night with 6.93m. However the episode of The X Factor broadcast between the two episodes received a much higher number of viewers, attracting 10.51m. The second set of episodes, broadcast on the following night, showed a drop in ratings down to 4.47m for the first episode, and 5.55m for the second. The first episode of the night was beaten by an episode of Countryfile, which commanded 5.62m, while the second was beaten by another BBC show, Inspector George Gently, which attracted 6.47m.

The third pair of episodes, on the Monday evening, showed the series regaining some ground, with the first episode moving back up to 5.02m, and gaining a larger share of the market during its time slot than any other channel. The second episode had lower ratings for the first time, with 4.99m, seeing it beaten by an episode of New Tricks on BBC One.

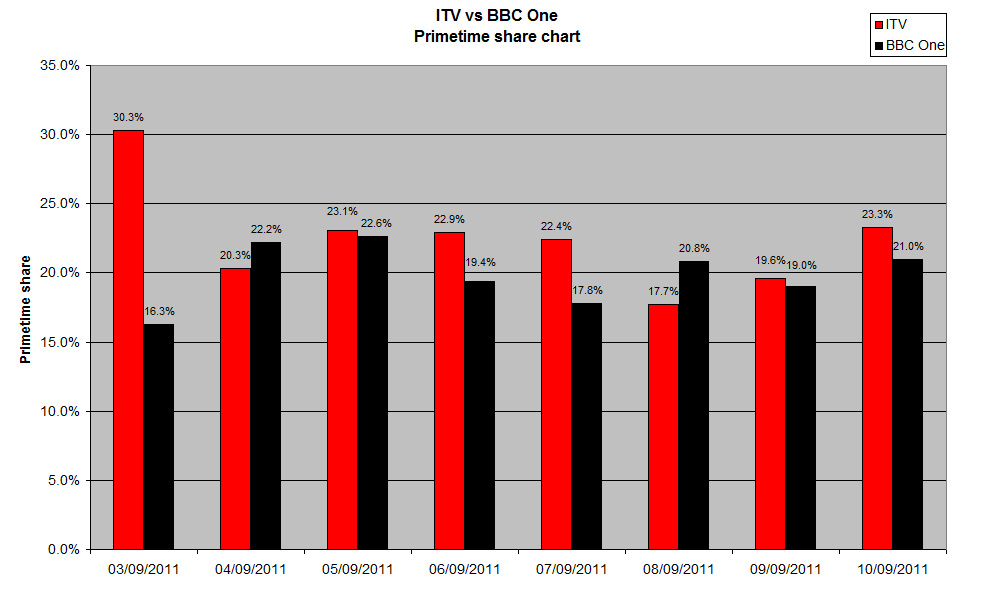
A graph showing the difference in primetime share between the main ITV channel (red), and BBC One (black) in the week in which Red or Black? aired.

After a break on the Tuesday evening, the show returned on Wednesday whilst averaging 4.65m for the first show of the evening, a 21% audience share which was larger than anything else in its time slot. The second episode broadcast at 9:30 pm, with 4.46m, an 18.7% share which was beaten by an episode of BBC One's Who Do You Think You Are? on Emilia Fox which commanded 5.39 million viewers. Ratings continued to decline on the Thursday evening shows, with both shows being viewed by fewer than four million viewers for the first time, 3.81m and 3.86m respectively, seeing the first show being beaten by BBC One's Watchdog which gained 5.23m in the 8 pm slot.

The sixth set of episodes also stayed below the 4 million mark, but in an evening that saw ITV beat BBC One's audience share in the evening by 19.6% to 19%, including the earlier episode of Red of Black? gaining 3.8m viewers, while the later show was viewed by slightly more with 3.9m. However, in direct competition with the later show was BBC One's Would I Lie to You? which had slightly more viewers, with 4m tuning in. On the return of Red or Black? to Saturday night, the show climbed above 4 million for the first time in three days, to 4.63m for the first show and then up to 5.67m for the second. This enabled ITV to beat BBC One in the primetime ratings overall, by 23.3% to 21%, even though the first episode of series 8 of Strictly Come Dancing was broadcast on BBC. However Red or Black? individually placed behind both Strictly and Doctor Who, with the overnights for the BBC shows being 7.6 and 6.0 million, respectively. Overall through the week the main ITV channel had a higher share of the ratings during primetime than BBC One on five out of the seven occasions, a turnaround from the previous week where it only won on a single evening.

Episode	First	Second
3 September	6.41m	6.93m
4 September	4.47m	5.55m
5 September	5.02m	4.99m
7 September	4.65m	4.46m
8 September	3.81m	3.86m
9 September	3.80m	3.90m
10 September	4.43m	5.67m

==== Series 2 ====
On 11–12 August 2012, the Saturday and Sunday prior to the launch of the second series of Red or Black?, ITV suffered the worst weekend in its 57-year history due to BBC One's coverage of the 2012 Summer Olympics; it was beaten to second place in the primetime league tables by BBC Three for the first time ever and the only ITV programme on 11 August that was one of the channel's 30 most watched in the week 6–12 August 2012 was the ITV News at Ten. The Olympics closing ceremony the following night gave BBC One more than 20 times the audience share of ITV. While the lead was nowhere near as large on the remainder of the evenings, BBC One still beat ITV every night on the overall primetime audience share, except for Thursday night.

Red or Black? launched its second series on 18 August 2012, with 3.25 million viewers, giving the show a 19.6% share of the market between 7 pm and 8:15 pm; it was beaten in its time slot by a showing of Indiana Jones and the Kingdom of the Crystal Skull, which gained 4m on BBC One. It returned later in the night with 3.59m. The episode of The X Factor broadcast between the two episodes received a higher number of viewers, attracting 8.08m. The second set of episodes, broadcast the week after, saw a small rise in viewers with 3.42m for the first episode, and 3.70m for the second. In the third week, it got 3.30m for the first episode and 3.06m for the second. Week four brought in 3.17m for the first episode and 3.63m for the second. 3.29m people tuned in for week five's first episode and 3.25m for the second episode. Week six produced 3.39m for the first episode and 3.23m for the second. The final set of shows produced 3.23m and 2.84m viewers for the first and second episodes, respectively.

Episode	First	Second
18 August	3.25m	3.59m
25 August	3.42m	3.70m
1 September	3.30m	3.06m
8 September	3.17m	3.63m
15 September	3.29m	3.55m
22 September	3.39m	3.23m
29 September	3.23m	2.84m

=== Critical response ===
Christopher Hooton, writing for the Metro, chose the show as one of his four weekend picks prior to the first episode. However, Rachel Tarley, writing for the same newspaper, later compared the show to It's a Knockout, but described the contestants as "morons" and said the show "marks a new era in Syco's lazy, sinister attempts to make money from a hopelessly stupid viewing public". Jim Shelley, of the Daily Mirror, described Red or Black? as "mess", and described the stunts as "dull"; Kevin O'Sullivan, also at the Mirror, described the show as a "sausage factory of sob stories"; while Ken Smith, of The Herald, described it as the "dullest show of the week". Jonathan Liew, of The Daily Telegraph, requested that readers stopped watching the show, whilst describing it as "so devoid of intellect that it actually sucks nearby intelligence into its vortex. This is, without exaggeration or embellishment, an abominably stupid television programme." Readers of UKGameshows.com named it the worst new game show of 2011 in their "Hall of shame" poll. On 26 October 2012, Richard Osman, writing for The Guardian, named Red or Black? among four of UK TV's worst ever gameshows.

During the airing of the first show, Twitter users complained that finalist Angel McKenzie had made it through, as she was previously a housemate during Big Brother 10 in 2009. However, McKenzie's appearance was overshadowed by stories relating to £1 million winner Nathan Hageman, as it was revealed that he had a criminal background. ITV had conducted a CRB check on each finalist towards the end of July, over a month prior to the first live show. When later discussing the incident, Simon Cowell said, "I'm not in a position to force anyone to do anything. Once he got through that's why he got the money, that's his own conscience what he decides to do with it."

Following the media frenzy about details of Hageman's offence, two contestants that had not yet appeared on the show were removed by ITV. It was revealed that one had failed to disclose that he had a criminal record during the application process, while information on the second contestant was withheld. A third contestant was subsequently removed by ITV. Each contestant was from a different night, with the first removed on the programme aired 7 September; however footage pre–filmed revealed his identity.

== Transmissions ==
Series	Start date	End date	Episodes
1	3 September 2011	10 September 2011	7
2	18 August 2012	29 September 2012	7

=== Awards and nominations ===
Organisation	Award category	Result
National Television Awards	Best Entertainment Programme	Nominated

== Notes ==
- A The first two rounds for each episode took place at Wembley Arena, rounds three to six took place on location, and the final four rounds were broadcast live from The Fountain Studios.

== International versions ==
- The first international version of Red or Black? was the Chinese version of the show is 旗鼓相當 (Qi gu shang dang). The first episode aired on 29 April 2012 on China Network Television with a top prize of 10,000 元.
- The Ukrainian version, Червоне або чорне?/Красное или чёрное (Chervone abo chorne?/Krasnoe ili chyornoe) has 1000 contenders at the beginning of each show. The first episode aired on 10 November 2012 on Inter with a top prize of 1,000,000 ₴.
- The Italian version of the show is entitled Red or Black? – Tutto o Niente and was aired on television channel Rai 1. This show was based on the second British version, with eight contenders competing against each other. The first episode aired on 22 February 2013 and the top prize was of 100.000 €.
- Vietnam is the fourth country with its own version of the show, with the name Trò chơi trời cho. 50 players participated in each show throughout four rounds, with a top prize of ₫50,000,000 and a trip to Phu Quoc Island. The first episode airs on August 22, 2022 on VTV3.

Country	Title	Broadcaster	Presenter(s)	Premiere	Finale
China	旗鼓相當; Qi gu shang dang	CNTV	Gao Buo and Shu Dong	29 April 2012	1 May 2012
Italy	Red or Black? – Tutto o niente	Rai 1	Fabrizio Frizzi and Gabriele Cirilli	22 February 2013	5 April 2013
Ukraine	Червоне або чорне? Красное или чёрное Chervone abo chorne? Krasnoe ili chyornoe	Inter	Volodymyr Zelenskyy and Dmitriy Shepelev	10 November 2012	15 December 2012
Vietnam	Trò chơi trời cho	VTV3	Thành Trung	22 August 2022	7 November 2022

A U.S. version was in development for Fox with Ant & Dec as hosts but was ultimately passed over.
