= Good Ol' Fashioned Love =

Studio album by The Overtones
- Released: 1 November 2010
- Recorded: 2009–2010
- Genre: Doo-wop; pop
- Length: 34:58
- Label: Rhino Entertainment
- Producer: Nick Southwood

The Overtones chronology
Good Ol' Fashioned Love (2010)	Higher (2012)

Singles from Good Ol' Fashioned Love
- 1. "Gambling Man" Released: 8 October 2010; 2. "The Longest Time" Released: 25 April 2011; 3. "Second Last Chance" Released: 15 August 2011; 4. "Say What I Feel" Released: 16 December 2011

Professional ratings
Review scores
Source	Rating
AllMusic	review link

Good Ol' Fashioned Love is the debut studio album by British-Irish doo-wop boy band the Overtones. The album was released on 1 November 2010 in the UK by Rhino Entertainment. The album was subsequently re-released on 8 March 2011, containing a number of new tracks. The album peaked at number 4 on the UK Albums Chart and number 14 on the Irish Albums Chart. The album was released in Germany and Austria on 23 March 2012, renamed Gambling Man.

The album has sold 470,000 copies as of April 2018.

== Singles ==
- "Gambling Man" was released as the first single from the album on 8 October 2010. The track peaked at number 82 on the UK Singles Chart, and was later released as the album's lead single in international territories such as Germany and Austria.
- "The Longest Time", a cover of the Billy Joel original, was released as the second single from the album on 25 April 2011. It was the only cover version from the album to be released as a single.
- "Second Last Chance" was released as the third single from the album on 15 August 2011. It was the first single to be released from the Platinum edition of the album.
- "Say What I Feel" was released as the fourth and final single from the album on 16 December 2011. It was the second original song to be released from the album as a single. The track was co-written by Five member Sean Conlon and songwriter Peter-John Vetesse.

== Track listing ==
Good Ol' Fashioned Love – Standard edition
No.	Title	Writer(s)	Length
1.	"Sh-Boom (Life Could Be a Dream)"	James Keyes; Claude Feaster; Carl Feaster; Floyd F. McRae; James Edwards	2:40
2.	"Gambling Man"	The Overtones; Nick Southwood	3:33
3.	"Come Back My Love"	Bobby Mansfield	2:44
4.	"Carolyn"	The Overtones; Southwood; Scott Baker	2:46
5.	"The Longest Time"	Billy Joel	3:32
6.	"Good Ol' Fashioned Love"	The Overtones; Drew Scott; Joachim Scharup-Jensen; Jonas Jeberg; Mich Hansen; Sean Alexander	3:23
7.	"Blue Moon"	Richard Rodgers; Lorenz Hart	2:45
8.	"Have I Told You Lately That I Love you"	Scott Wiseman	3:03
9.	"In the Still of the Night"	Fred Parris	3:00
10.	"Don't Make Me Over"	Burt Bacharach; Hal David	3:55
11.	"Goodnight Sweetheart, Goodnight"	James Bracken; James Hudson	2:55
12.	"Why Do Fools Fall in Love"	Frankie Lymon; Morris Levy	2:24

Good Ol' Fashioned Love – iTunes Store deluxe edition (bonus tracks)
No.	Title	Writer(s)	Length
13.	"Only Girl in the World"	Crystal Johnson; Mikkel S. Eriksen; Tor Erik Hermansen; Sandy Wilhelm	3:05
14.	"Rolling in the Deep"	Adele Adkins; Paul Epworth	4:08
15.	"We Can Work It Out"	John Lennon; Paul McCartney	2:23

Good Ol' Fashioned Love – Platinum Edition
No.	Title	Writer(s)	Length
1.	"Second Last Chance"	The Overtones; Hiten Bharadia; Iain James; Jukka Immonen	3:44
2.	"Sh-Boom"	Keyes; Claude Feaster; Carl Feaster; McRae; Edwards	2:40
3.	"Gambling Man"	The Overtones; Southwood	3:33
4.	"Come Back My Love"	Mansfield	2:44
5.	"Say What I Feel"	The Overtones; Sean Conlon; Peter-John Vettese	3:26
6.	"Carolyn"	The Overtones; Southwood; Baker	2:46
7.	"The Longest Time"	Joel	3:31
8.	"Good Ol' Fashioned Love"	The Overtones; Scott; Scharup-Jensen; Jeberg; Hansen; Alexander	3:22
9.	"Blue Moon"	Rodgers; Hart	2:45
10.	"Have I Told You Lately That I Love you"	Wiseman	3:03
11.	"In the Still of the Night"	Parris	3:00
12.	"Don't Make Me Over"	Bacharach; David	3:55
13.	"Whoops"	The Overtones; Paul Barry	3:07
14.	"Goodnight Sweetheart, Goodnight"	Bracken; Hudson	2:55
15.	"Why Do Fools Fall in Love"	Lymon; Levy	2:24
16.	"Only Girl in the World"	Johnson; Eriksen; Hermansen; Wilhelm	3:05
17.	"Rolling in the Deep"	Adkins; Epworth	4:08
18.	"Beggin'"	Bob Gaudio; Peggy Farina	3:00

Gambling Man – Standard edition
No.	Title	Writer(s)	Length
1.	"Second Last Chance"	The Overtones; Bharadia; James; Immonen	3:44
2.	"Sh-Boom"	Keyes; Claude Feaster; Carl Feaster; McRae; Edwards	2:40
3.	"Gambling Man"	The Overtones; Southwood	3:33
4.	"Come Back My Love"	Mansfield	2:44
5.	"Say What I Feel"	The Overtones; Conlon; Vettese	3:26
6.	"Carolyn"	The Overtones; Southwood; Baker	2:46
7.	"The Longest Time"	Joel	3:31
8.	"Good Ol' Fashioned Love"	The Overtones; Scott; Scharup-Jensen; Jeberg; Hansen; Alexander	3:22
9.	"Blue Moon"	Rodgers; Hart	2:45
10.	"Have I Told You Lately That I Love you"	Wiseman	3:03
11.	"In the Still of the Night"	Parris	3:00
12.	"Don't Make Me Over"	Bacharach; David	3:55
13.	"Whoops"	The Overtones; Barry	3:07
14.	"Goodnight Sweetheart, Goodnight"	Bracken; Hudson	2:55
15.	"Why Do Fools Fall in Love"	Lymon; Levy	2:24
16.	"Only Girl in the World"	Johnson; Eriksen; Hermansen; Wilhelm	3:05
17.	"Rolling in the Deep"	Adkins; Epworth	4:08
18.	"Beggin'"	Bob Gaudio; Peggy Farina	3:00
19.	"Forget You"	Bruno Mars; CeeLo Green; Philip Lawrence; Brody Brown; Ari Levine	3:39
20.	"We Can Work It Out"	Lennon; McCartney	2:23

== Charts ==
=== Weekly charts ===
==== Good Ol' Fashioned Love ====
Chart (2010–2012)	Peak position
Dutch Albums (Album Top 100)	19
Irish Albums (IRMA)	14
Scottish Albums (OCC)	6
Swiss Albums (Schweizer Hitparade)	38
UK Albums (OCC)	4

==== Gambling Man ====
Chart (2012)	Peak position
Austrian Albums (Ö3 Austria)	34
German Albums (Offizielle Top 100)	18

=== Year-end charts ===
==== Good Ol' Fashioned Love ====
Chart (2011)	Position
UK Albums (OCC)	34

== Release history ==
Region	Date	Format	Label
United Kingdom	1 November 2010	CD, Digital download	Rhino Entertainment
United Kingdom	8 March 2011	Digital download	Rhino Entertainment
