= Ashley Revell =

English entrepreneur (born 1971/1972)

- Born: 1971 or 1972 (age 54–55)
- Occupation: Entrepreneur

Ashley Revell (born 1971 or 1972) is an English entrepreneur. Revell's US$135,300 roulette bet in 2004, for which he sold many of his possessions, was televised by Sky One.

== Career ==
Revell previously played the television station L!VE TV's mascot, the News Bunny, and then was a researcher and "celebrity booker" for the station.

In 2000, Revell's efforts to open a television presenter talent agency were covered in the Channel 4 documentary When Will I Be Famous? A reviewer in the Guardian wrote of his career's "sleazy trajectory". At the time of his bet in 2004, the Evening Standard reported that Revell helped to "supply fake guests for Vanessa Feltz's chat show" through his talent agency and "was exposed in a tabloid for allegedly running a contest in which the prize was a penis enlargement." The newspaper also doubted his claims that he had made £25,000 as a professional poker player in the previous 2 years.

== Roulette bet ==
In 2004, Revell sold all his possessions, including his clothes, and on 11 April he gambled US$135,300 (about £76,840 at the time) on a single spin of a roulette wheel in the Plaza Hotel & Casino in Las Vegas. He raised additional cash through car boot sales and auctions. Having placed his chips on red, the ball ended up on 7, a red, and Revell doubled his money to US$270,600.

The event was filmed by Sky One as a reality mini-series titled Double or Nothing. He was also featured in an E! documentary special along with Stu Ungar called THS Investigates: Vegas Winners & Losers. He spent some of the winnings on entering the World Series of Poker tournament and a Triumph Tiger motorcycle. Revell also used his winnings to set up an online poker company named Poker UTD, which later went out of business in 2012 due to controversy over US frozen accounts.

An episode of the television series Las Vegas entitled "One Nation, Under Surveillance", first broadcast on 14 March 2005, had a character and event loosely based on Revell. Music executive Simon Cowell said that Revell's bet was the inspiration behind his 2011–2012 game show called Red or Black?.

== Personal life ==
After returning home from the roulette bet in 2004, Revell took a motorcycle trip around Europe during which he met his future wife in Holland.
