= Gambling Man =

Single by The Overtones

from the album Good Ol' Fashioned Love
- Released: 8 October 2010
- Recorded: 2010
- Genre: Jazz pop; doo-wop
- Length: 3:13
- Label: Warner Music Group
- Songwriters: Lachie Chapman; Mike Crawshaw; Darren Everest; Mark Franks; Timmy Matley; Nick Southwood
- Producer: Nick Southwood

The Overtones singles chronology
"Gambling Man" (2010)	"The Longest Time" (2011)

"Gambling Man" is the debut single from five-piece British-Irish doo-wop boy band the Overtones, from their debut album Good Ol' Fashioned Love. The single was released in the United Kingdom as a digital download on 8 October 2010.

== Music video ==
A music video to accompany the release of "Gambling Man" was first released onto YouTube on 27 September 2010; at a total length of three minutes and thirty-three seconds. The video also featured British actor Mel Mills as "Mr Big" in a rare video appearance along with his private vehicle, a 30 year old Jaguar XJS 5.3 H.E V12 hand built by Paul Banham.

== Track listing ==
Digital download
No.	Title	Length
1.	"Gambling Man"	3:13

== Chart performance ==
Chart (2011–2012)	Peak position
Austria (Ö3 Austria Top 40)	32
Belgium (Ultratip Bubbling Under Flanders)	90
Germany (GfK)	16
Switzerland (Schweizer Hitparade)	38
UK Singles (The Official Charts Company)	82

== Release history ==
Region	Date	Format	Label
United Kingdom	8 October 2010	Digital download	Warner Music Group
United Kingdom	20 May 2011	Digital download	Warner Music Group
