= Sparks (Cover Drive song) =

Single by Cover Drive

from the album Bajan Style
- Released: 29 April 2012
- Recorded: 2011
- Genre: Pop
- Length: 2:58
- Label: Polydor
- Songwriter(s): Steve Mac, Menelik Eu'el Solomon, Jamar Harding & Wayne Hector
- Producer(s): Steve Mac

Cover Drive singles chronology
"Twilight" (2012)	"Sparks" (2012)	"Turn Up the Love" (2012)

"Sparks" is the third single recorded by Barbados-based pop group Cover Drive. The song was released on 29 April 2012 as a digital download in the United Kingdom, taken from their debut album Bajan Style.

== Music video ==
A music video to accompany the release of "Sparks" was first released on YouTube on 16 March 2012 at a total length of three minutes and three seconds.

== Critical reception ==
Lewis Corner of Digital Spy gave the song a positive review stating:

"It's just another night, the boys are getting hype/ But baby in my head, I'm there with you instead," T-Ray bluntly confesses over a clap-happy beat and smooth synths, before Amanda takes the reigns [sic] on a wibbly-lipped chorus that will grab your ears and refuse to let go. With a hook more seductive than a heartthrob vampire, we suspect Cover Drive will have the public under their charms once again..

== Track listing ==
Digital download
No.	Title	Length
1.	"Sparks"	2:58
2.	"What I Like"	3:31
3.	"Sparks" (Wookie Remix)	4:21
4.	"Sparks" (The Alias Remix)	5:01
5.	"Sparks" (Red Boyz Dancehall Remix)	2:54

== Chart performance ==
=== Weekly charts ===
Chart (2012)	Peak position
Ireland (IRMA)	29
Scotland (OCC)	5
UK Singles (OCC)	4
UK Official Streaming Chart Top 100	58

=== Year-end charts ===
Chart (2012)	Position
UK Singles (Official Charts Company)	166

== Certifications ==
Region	Certification	Certified units/sales
United Kingdom (BPI)	Silver	200,000^{‡}
^{‡} Sales+streaming figures based on certification alone.

== Release history ==
Country	Release date	Format	Label
United Kingdom	29 April 2012	Digital download	Global Talent
