= Lick Ya Down =

Single by Cover Drive

from the album Bajan Style
- Released: August 28, 2011
- Recorded: 2011
- Length: 3:21
- Label: Global Talent
- Songwriter(s): J.R. Rotem, Marty James, Karen Reifer, Thomas-Ray Armstrong, Jamar Harding, Peter Ring
- Producer(s): J.R. Rotem, Aliby

Cover Drive singles chronology
"Lick Ya Down" (2011)	"Twilight" (2012)

Music video
- "Lick Ya Down" on YouTube

"Lick Ya Down" is the debut single released by Barbadian pop group Cover Drive. The single was released on August 28, 2011 as a digital download in the United Kingdom, taken from their debut album Bajan Style. On September 4, 2011, the song entered at number 9 on the UK Singles Chart for the week ending September 10, 2011.

== Background ==
In an interview with Digital Spy the group were asked to describe their single, Amanda from the group said: "'Lick Ya Down' is a phrase from Barbados which contrary to popular belief in the UK is not 'naughty' - It means 'knock ya down'! We had to add in an explanation at the beginning of the video of what it means as everyone thought it was something else. There's a lot of fun, attitude and energy in there." A music video to accompany the release of "Lick Ya Down" was first released onto YouTube on 13 July 2011 at a total length of three minutes and thirty-five seconds. At the end of the music video, when the group gets in the car, their second single 'Twilight' begins to play.

== Track listing ==
Digital download
No.	Title	Length
1.	"Lick Ya Down"	3:21
2.	"Lick Ya Down" (Wideboys Club Remix)	6:09

== Chart performance ==
Chart (2011)	Position
Scotland (OCC)	11
UK Singles (OCC)	9

== Release history ==
Country	Release date	Format	Label
United Kingdom	August 28, 2011	Digital download	Global Talent
