= Bajan Style =

Studio album by Cover Drive
- Released: 7 May 2012
- Recorded: 2011
- Genre: R&B; pop; reggae fusion; hip-hop
- Length: 51:29
- Label: Polydor Records
- Producer: Future Cut; Quiz & Larossi; J.R. Rotem; Aliby; Orange Factory; Steve Mac; August Rigo; Supa Dups

Cover Drive chronology
| Bajan Style (2012) | Fall Forward (2017) |

Singles from Bajan Style
- 1. "Lick Ya Down" Released: 28 August 2011; 2. "Twilight" Released: 22 January 2012; 3. "Sparks" Released: 29 April 2012; 4. "Explode" Released: 26 August 2012

Bajan Style is the debut studio album from Barbados-based pop group Cover Drive, released on 7 May 2012 through Polydor Records. The band enlisted a variety of producers such as Future Cut, Quiz & Larossi, J.R. Rotem, Aliby, Orange Factory and Steve Mac to work on the record. The album is rooted in R&B, pop, reggae fusion, hip-hop and synth-pop genres.

Bajan Style received generally positive reviews from music critics, who complimented Cover Drive's Barbados "summer"-feel input to British charts and described the band's songs as "catchy". Critics also applauded the group's lead singer Amanda Reifer for her easy ability to perform different song styles, and compared her to recording artist Rihanna, who, like the band, also originates from Barbados. Some compared the album to the work of No Doubt and Black Eyed Peas. The album charted at number 14 on the UK Albums Chart and on the Scottish Albums Chart at 28.

Four singles have been released from the album as of August 2012, three of which have charted within the top ten of the UK singles chart. "Lick Ya Down" was released as the lead single on 28 August 2011. After receiving heavy airplay on both the radio and music channels in the United Kingdom, the song peaked at number nine on the UK singles chart. The second single "Twilight", became the group's first single to chart in Ireland, and their first UK number one. "Sparks", the third single, charted at number four in the UK and 29 in Ireland. "Explode" featuring vocals from British grime rapper Dappy served as the fourth single from the album and reached number 29 in the UK and 27 in Ireland.

== Background ==
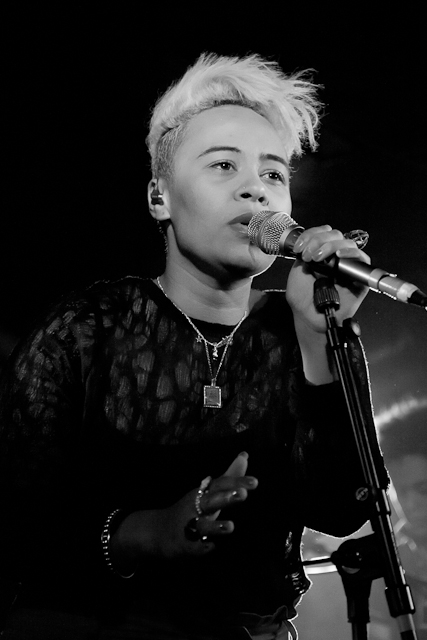
Emeli Sandé was one of the writers of the album.

After the band were signed by Polydor Records, they began writing and recording material for their debut album. Whilst in the studio, they met American producer J. R. Rotem who produced their debut single, "Lick Ya Down", the band also worked with Quiz & Larossi. One of the band's first recording sessions was spent with Scottish singer and songwriter Emeli Sandé. They described their experience with her saying, "That was one of our first sessions and it was great to work with her. She’s an amazing writer and vocalist. What an incredible voice. It was a feel-good song as we like to write feelgood music. The reason we didn’t go with it was because it wasn’t completely Cover Drive and we wanted the first album to really reflect us and represent us 100%. That song is amazing, but it wouldn’t have worked on the album we’ve made."

The band described "Bajan Style" as "a beach party in Barbados" and "guaranteed sand in your shoes." Lead singer Amanda explained, "Our aim with the album was to have as much fun as we did in our basement. We definitely did and you can hear it in the songs. They’re about being young, having fun and living in the Caribbean sun."

== Singles ==
- "Lick Ya Down" was released on 28 August 2011 as the lead single from the album, and the band's debut single. After receiving heavy airplay on both radio and music channels in the United Kingdom, the song peaked at number nine on the UK singles chart and number three on the UK R&B Chart.
- "Twilight" was released on 22 January 2012 as the second single. The song was produced by Quiz & Larossi. It became the band's first single to chart in Ireland, reaching number 30. The song entered the UK singles chart at number one.
- "Sparks" was released on 29 April 2012 as the third single from the album. It reached number four on the UK singles chart and number 29 in Ireland.
- "Explode" was released on 26 August 2012 as the fourth single from the album. The single was remixed to feature vocals from British grime artist Dappy. It peaked at number 29 on the UK singles chart and number 27 in Ireland.

== Reception ==
=== Critical reception ===
The album received generally positive reviews from music critics.

Becca Longmire of Entertainmentwise applauded the album describing it as a "job well done". She continued saying, "Amanda has a pretty rare quality in the fact that she has the ability to flip from a ballad, such as their chart topper 'Twilight', to a slightly sassier 'Rihanna style' track, such as debut single 'Lick Ya Down'. The tracks that stand out the most have to be title track 'Bajan Style' – which definitely shows off the band's Barbados roots, and another slightly more upbeat track 'Headphones', which emphasises the band's musical ability and raw talent. With lyrics such as 'Boy I want to put you on repeat, you will be the bass of my heartbeat...', it's easy to compare Amanda to fellow Bajan beauty Rihanna – however, this band definitely have their own sound and the album has some sure fire, catchy hits!"

Krystal Scanlon of Gigwise gave the album a positive review commenting, "Cover Drive’s first three singles have already scored Barbadian band huge hit singles, so it was obvious the band have already got their career off to a good start." She continued saying, "The opening track 'Bajan Style Intro' is just a perfect taster of what the album has to offer. With a hint of an early Black Eyed Peas tone to some of their songs, this album offers its listeners a variety of solid beats, catchy lyrics, and an overall good feeling. The background beat of 'Headphones' holds a similar style of tune to No Doubt's "Hey Baby" – so if you’re a fan of the lovely Gwen Stefani, this is definitely worth a try. 'Lick Ya Down' rivals Rihanna for the radio-friendly sounds heard on her recent album, but that said, Cover Drive still have their own unique style, and this song is equally catchy, just like the rest of this album. With their front girl, Amanda being labeled the new Bajan Queen of the music scene, Rihanna is definitely going to have a little competition on her hands in the charts. 'Wrongside' is another standout tune and has a vibe similar to Shaggy's 'It Wasn't Me' with the backing rhythm. While a lot of these songs do have a catchy beat, and could be considered similar, it’s safe to say there is still a lot of variety amongst the songs – from calmer, slow songs to upbeat songs that make you want to dance. Cover Drive are definitely some way from their pop peak on this, their first album, but there’s no doubt that this is going to set the bar high. It’ll be interesting to see what song they release next because they certainly have a good set to choose from."

Lewis Corner of Digital Spy awarded the album three out of five stars, commenting, "From the off, it's clear the group have been influenced by other mixed quartets No Doubt and the Black Eyed Peas. As such, singer Amanda Reifer serves as the Fergie/Gwen Stefani and takes the lead on the majority of the tracks. She can flip from butter-wouldn't-melt on mid-tempo love song 'Twilight' to passionate and sassy on debut single 'Lick Ya Down' in an instant – and she pulls it off with ease. However, it's 'Headphones' that showcases the band's real ability as musicians. "Boy I want to put you on repeat/ You will be the bass of my heartbeat," Amanda swoons over bouncy beats and funk-driven guitar riffs, packed with more tropical flavour and sweetness than an ice-cold can of Lilt. 'Sparks' proves they are more than capable of taking on the trickier ballads, producing an ear-snagging pop melody with a floating piano riff and radio-friendly vocals. Penultimate cut 'Hurricane' injects a welcome burst of back-end energy after non-starters 'Wrongside' and 'Can't Live in a World' begin to pull things down. Like all good cricket matches, there may be quiet spells during the game, but it's only the final result that really matters. Luckily for Cover Drive, their very first innings contains some very memorable hits."

Alex MacPherson of The Guardian awarded the album three out of five stars, saying "The summer dancehall hit, once an annual staple of the British charts, has been on a hiatus in recent years – as Bajan four-piece Cover Drive have spotted. Their compatriot Rihanna may have long abandoned reggae-lite pop for foghorn electro, but her early years provide fertile inspiration for Cover Drive, from the steel pans and airhorns of breakthrough hit 'Lick Ya Down' to the fluttering, yearning 'Explode'. Lead singer Amanda Reifer could be mistaken for Rihanna, albeit a less charismatic version – a quality that also explains why Cover Drive's breezy, beach party-vibes are highly likable, but a bit lightweight. Still, in an era when most pop stars' strategy is to bludgeon you into submission, that's refreshing."

== Track listing ==
| No. | Title | Writer(s) | Producer(s) | Length |
|---|---|---|---|---|
| 1. | "Bajan Style (Intro)" | Cover Drive • Iyiola Babalola • Darren Lewis • Viktoria Hansen | Future Cut | 1:17 |
| 2. | "Twilight" | Cover Drive • Andreas Romdhane • Josef Larossi • Ina Wroldsen | Quiz & Larossi | 3:27 |
| 3. | "Lick Ya Down" | Cover Drive • Jonathan Rotem • Marty James • Peter Ring | J.R. Rotem • Aliby (co.) | 3:21 |
| 4. | "Headphones" | Cover Drive • Orange Factory • Jonathan Perkins • Khaled Rohaim | Orange Factory | 3:58 |
| 5. | "That Girl" | Cover Drive • Wroldsen • Steve Mac | Steve Mac | 2:37 |
| 6. | "Sparks" | Cover Drive • Mac • Wayne Hector | Steve Mac | 2:55 |
| 7. | "Explode" | Cover Drive • Mac | Steve Mac | 3:08 |
| 8. | "Wrongside" | Cover Drive • August Rigo | August Rigo | 3:26 |
| 9. | "Can't Live in a World" | Cover Drive • Ali Tamposi • Dwayne Chin-Quee • Mitchum Chin • Mathew Samuels | Supa Dups | 3:48 |
| 10. | "Hurricane" | Cover Drive • Babalola • Lewis • Hansen | Future Cut | 3:24 |
| 11. | "I Know You Too Well" | Cover Drive • Hector • Romdhane • Larossi | Quiz & Larossi | 3:26 |
| 12. | "Bajan Style (Outro)" | Cover Drive • Babalola • Lewis • Hansen | Future Cut | 0:37 |
| Total length: | | | | 35:29 |

Digital Deluxe Edition Bonus Tracks
| No. | Title | Writer(s) | Producer(s) | Length |
|---|---|---|---|---|
| 13. | "She La La Lay" | Karen Reifer; T-Ray Armstrong; Jamar Harding; Barry Hill; Sean Henriques; Wycliffe Johnson; Clifford Ray Smith; Cleveland Constatine Browne; Eliseus Joseph; Julian Griffith | | 3:05 |
| 14. | "No Breaks" | Hasham Hussain; Denarius Motes; Tiyon "TC" Mack; Reifer; Armstrong; Harding | | 3:07 |
| 15. | "Bajan Style" (Full Version) | Babalola; Lewis; Viktoria Hansen; Reifer; Armstrong; Harding; Hill | Future Cut | 2:59 |
| Total length: | | | | 41:55 |

Digital Deluxe Edition Bonus Videos
| No. | Title | Writer(s) | Director(s) | Length |
|---|---|---|---|---|
| 16. | "Lick Ya Down" (Video) | Rotem; James; Reifer; Armstrong; Harding; Ring | Syndrome | 3:35 |
| 17. | "Twilight" (Video) | Romdhane; Larossi; Wroldsen; Reifer; Armstrong; Harding | John D. Aguon and Chaz Wood | 3:35 |
| 18. | "Sparks" (Video) | Reifer; Armstrong; Harding; Hector; Mac | Declan Whitebloom | 3:04 |
| Total length: | | | | 51:29 |

== Charts ==
| Chart (2012) | Peak position |
|---|---|
| Scottish Albums Chart | 28 |
| UK Albums Chart | 14 |
| Irish Albums Chart | 99 |
