= The Overtones =

British boy band

- Origin: London
- Genres: Pop, soul, doo-wop
- Years active: 2010–present
- Labels: Warner Bros., GamblingMan
- Members: Mike Crawshaw; Darren Everest; Mark Franks; Jay James Picton
- Past members: Lachlan "Lockie" Chapman; Timmy Matley
- Website: www.theovertones.tv

The Overtones are a UK-based vocal harmony group. They were discovered by a Warner Bros. Records talent scout while working as decorators in a shop near Oxford Street, singing during their tea break. Their first album, Good Ol' Fashioned Love, entered the UK Albums Chart at #16 in November 2010. After its re-release in March 2011, it reached #4. More than 500,000 copies of their first album have been sold.

== History ==
=== Origins ===
The members were originally in a band called DYYCE, which then reformed as Lexi Joe, which formed the basis of The Overtones. With four members originally – Mark Franks, Mike Crawshaw, Darren Everest and Timmy Matley – the band had been performing for several years. The four all shared an interest in the doo-wop genre of the 1950s mixed with R&B and modern pop music. Their voices bear a strong resemblance to a 1980s' doo-wop boyband, 14 Karat Soul. After auditioning on The X Factor in 2009, as Lexi Joe, they were rejected from the final 24. Later, they met Lockie Chapman, discovered similar tastes in music and reformed themselves as a five-piece band, under the name of The Overtones. Everest then had the idea of starting a painting and decorating company so that the five could practice together while working. It was while painting a shop near Oxford Street in London that the band was discovered by a talent scout, while singing "The Longest Time". They later signed a 5-album deal with Warner Bros. Records.

=== Good 'Ol Fashioned Love (2010–2012) ===
The first album by The Overtones has a number of original tracks written by the band, including their first single "Gambling Man", the title track "Good Ol' Fashioned Love" and "Carolyn". In 2010, they made a number of high-profile public appearances, supporting Peter Andre on tour, and performing at Stockport's Christmas lights switch-on and at the Abbey Park fireworks display in Leicester. They have made a number of television appearances, including on This Morning.

On 13 March 2011, they were the house band for week 10 on the ITV show Dancing on Ice. On 1 June 2011, they were the house band for the third semi-final on the ITV show Britain's Got More Talent. In November 2011, they performed on The Saturday Night Show when the presenter Brendan O'Connor had to hold up a curtain after a "terrible mishap occurred in the RTÉ studio". The incident, available on YouTube, was nominated for the "Brown Trousers Moment" award at the 2011 Erics.

On 29 September 2012, they appeared in an episode of Red or Black? being part of a round by using a handkerchief in their performance. On 9 December 2012, they appeared as special guest performers in the final episode of series 9 of The Xtra Factor.

=== Higher and Saturday Night at the Movies (2012–2014) ===
In mid-2013, they announced the release date of their third album, Saturday Night at the Movies. It was released on 4 November 2013.

In early 2014, The Overtones went on a UK tour, stopping in Belfast, Northern Ireland, on 20 February. They toured with Sir Cliff Richard in Germany in May 2014.

=== Sweet Soul Music and Good 'Ol Fashioned Christmas (2015–2017) ===
In November 2014, The Overtones announced the release of their fourth studio album, Sweet Soul Music. It was released on 27 February 2015, with a brief tour commencing in June. Their fifth album and first Christmas album, Good Ol' Fashioned Christmas, was released on 27 November 2015, with a Christmas tour following in the UK.

In 2016, The Overtones toured with the stage show "That's Entertainment", a show featuring music from the 1930s, 1940s and 1950s. Later in 2016, The Overtones announced on their Facebook page that they would be touring from November to December, with their "Christmas with The Overtones Tour". On 21 November 2016, Matley announced via Twitter that he would not be joining the rest of the band on tour, having been diagnosed with skin cancer in September 2016. As he progressed through his treatment, Matley returned for the band's touring commitments in 2017 and the band began recording its sixth studio album.

=== Matley's death and The Overtones (2018) ===
On 9 April 2018, the band made an announcement stating that Matley had died. In order to grieve, all touring commitments were initially cancelled, except for a planned gig at the University of East Anglia, which had already been put back by three months due to Matley being ill. The gig then served as the band's first performance as a four-piece, and was billed as a tribute to Matley, with Chapman in particular performing a rendition of "Rainy Night in Georgia" dedicated to him. The group's fifth studio album, which was in the process of recording prior to Matley's death, was then finished, and released on 19 October 2018 on the band's own label Gambling Man Records. "Will You Still Love Me Tomorrow" includes vocals recorded by Matley's before his death.

The band then engaged in a Christmas tour throughout November and December 2018, which included a tribute to Matley. It was later revealed that Matley died from multiple traumatic injuries sustained in a fall from a balcony.

=== Chapman's departure and Jay James arrival (2019) ===
On 24 April 2019, Lachie Chapman announced that he would be leaving the band to pursue other commitments, citing his decision was partly due to the band "not feeling the same" since Matley's death. His last performance with the group took place on the Isle of Wight on 4 May 2019.

On 30 June 2019, the group released a teaser, confirming that following Lachie's departure, a new member of the group would be unveiled. The same day, the band unveiled former The X Factor contestant Jay James as Lachie's replacement. Jay's first performance with the group then took place twelve days later at Potters Resorts, Gorleston-on-Sea, preceded by the group's first release as the new line-up: a cover of Earth, Wind & Fire's hit "September". In November 2019, the group released a Christmas EP including September, and three covers of well known Christmas songs.

=== 10 and the Good Times tour (2020–present) ===
In early 2020, the band announced a 'Summer Celebration' tour, which was set to take place in May/June 2020. Due to the COVID-19 pandemic, the tour was cancelled, and instead the band used the time to record material for what would become their sixth studio album, '10'. '10' was released on 30 July 2021. Celebrating ten years of the group, the album features re-recorded versions of the group's biggest hits, plus new original material including "Amigo" and "Rose Tinted", plus collaborations with Michael Ball and Marisha Wallace.

A '10 Year Anniversary Tour' was announced to accompany the album, initially set to take place in November/December 2021. However, due to ongoing fallout from the panic, the tour was moved to May/June 2022, but due to unforeseen circumstances, was ultimately cancelled. In November 2022, the band released a cover of Neil Diamond's "Sweet Caroline" in support of England's participation in the 2022 FIFA World Cup.

In 2023, the group announced their first UK tour in four years, entitled the "Good Times" tour. The tour, taking place throughout November and December 2023, is the group's biggest tour to date, with 27 dates, and is supported by the release of a new, original Christmas single entitled "Christmas Everyday". All profits from the sale of the single are set to go to Diabetes UK. Britain's Got Talent finalist Tom Ball supported the group.

== Members ==
=== Mike Crawshaw ===
Michael Crawshaw (born 12 February 1980) comes from Bristol. He sings the middle harmonies.

Crawshaw grew up in Bedminster, with his family moving to Kingswood when he was 16. He attended Cheddar Grove School, Bedminster Down Comprehensive School and St Brendans Sixth Form College, where he had his first taste of singing in an amateur production of Jesus Christ Superstar. He performed with operatic societies in Bristol before moving to London to pursue his singing career. His favourite song is "Superstition" by Stevie Wonder.

=== Darren Everest ===
Darren Everest (born 30 May 1981) comes from Essex. He is the falsetto voice of the band.

Everest, a West Ham United supporter, had originally wanted to be a footballer and had played for Leyton Orient and Southend United. After falling ill with glandular fever, he was forced to stop playing for a year and took up singing.

=== Mark Franks ===
Mark Robert Franks (born 9 May 1977) comes from Sale, Greater Manchester. He sings the middle harmony sections in their songs.

Franks attended the Royal Ballet School from age 11 to 16. He was a professional dancer for 10 years before joining The Overtones. Franks has released some of his 1980s remixes under his "DJ Rescue Rangerz" name on Soundcloud.

=== Jay James ===
Jay James Picton (born 12 July 1983), known professionally as Jay James, is a Welsh recording artist, songwriter and broadcaster from Saundersfoot in Wales. A former serviceman at 16, he joined the Royal Navy and served for 10 years before leaving the military to pursue a career in music. As a songwriter and recording artist, he previously signed to Sony BMG and Universal Music's Decca Records. On 27 August 2012, he released his debut album, Play It By Heart. The album featured written collaborations with Booker T. Jones and John Legend and was recorded between New York and Los Angeles with producers Mike Peden and Malay. In 2014, James appeared on the 11th series of The X Factor, where he was mentored by Simon Cowell and finished in 8th place. In 2016, James joined the British Forces Broadcasting Service BFBS Radio to host The Big Show, a network music and entertainment series aired globally for Armed Forces personnel and their families. He has also worked for Made Television and hosted regional sports and entertainment series Sportsline for Bristol. In 2019, James presented the Vodafone Top 40 on regional stations across Wales. The Sunday Social with Jay James was a new series that featured guests Mark Ronson, Louis Tomlinson, The Stereophonics and Olly Murs. James is a Royal British Legion Ambassador and was the digital host for the Festival of Remembrance in 2018.

On 30 June 2019, James was announced as a new member of the Overtones.

== Past members ==
=== Timmy Matley ===
Timothy Thomas Matley (16 February 1982 – 9 April 2018) was from Cork, Ireland. He was the lead singer of the band, and sometimes joined the middle harmonies.

Matley entered into performing arts at the age of 14, and at 16 years old he travelled to London to audition for a performing arts school. He left Ireland when he was 17, as he did not enjoy college. He went travelling before deciding to get involved with songwriting and singing. In October 2014, he took part in the BBC Great British Sewing Bee for Children In Need, winning the show. Matley was diagnosed with stage three melanoma in 2016. Matley died in 2018 after falling from a balcony while under the influence of crystal meth.

=== Lockie Chapman ===
Lachlan Alexander "Lockie" Chapman (born 7 February 1981) comes from Manly, New South Wales, Australia. He was the bass singer.

Chapman left Australia on his 25th birthday and traveled to England in the hope of becoming an actor. In early 2016, Chapman appeared in the Channel 4 comedy series, Crashing.

Chapman announced on 24 April 2019 that he would be leaving the band to pursue other commitments. His last performance with the group was at the Isle of Wight on 4 May 2019.

Chapman started his solo singing career on 2 July 2019 following 3 sell out dates in London.

== Discography ==
=== Albums ===
Title	Details	Peak chart positions						Certifications
Title	Details	UK	AUT	GER	IRE	NL	SWI	Certifications
Good Ol' Fashioned Love	Released: 1 November 2010; Label: Warner Records; Format: Digital download, CD	4	34	18	14	19	38	IRE: Platinum; UK: Platinum
Higher	Released: 1 October 2012; Label: Warner Records; Format: Digital download, CD	6	—	—	19	—	—	UK: Gold
Saturday Night at the Movies	Released: 1 November 2013; Label: Warner Records; Format: Digital download, CD	5	—	—	11	—	—	
Sweet Soul Music	Released: 27 February 2015; Label: Warner Records; Format: Digital download, CD	8	—	—	39	—	—	
Good Ol' Fashioned Christmas	Released: 27 November 2015; Label: Gambling Man Records; Format: Digital download, CD	24	—	—	—	—	—	
The Overtones	Released: 19 October 2018; Label: Gambling Man Records; Format: Digital download, CD	11	—	—	—	—	—	UK: Silver
10	Released: 11 June 2021; Label: Hurricane Music; Format: Digital download, CD	27	—	—	—	—	—	
"—" denotes a recording that did not chart or was not released.

=== Extended plays ===
Title	Details
Happy Days	Released: 2017; Label: Gambling Man Records; Format: Digital download
Christmas	Released: 29 November 2019; Label: Gambling Man Records; Format: Digital download

=== Singles ===
Year	Single	Peak chart positions				Album
Year	Single	UK	GER	AUT	SWI	Album
2010	"Gambling Man"	82	16	32	38	Good Ol' Fashioned Love
2011	"The Longest Time"	—	—	—	—	Good Ol' Fashioned Love
2011	"Second Last Chance"	—	—	—	—	Good Ol' Fashioned Love
2011	"Say What I Feel"	—	—	—	—	Good Ol' Fashioned Love
2012	"Loving the Sound"	100	—	—	—	Higher
2012	"Higher"	—	—	—	—	Higher
2013	"Love Song"	—	—	—	—	Higher
2013	"Smile"	—	—	—	—	Non-album single
2014	"Saturday Night at the Movies"	—	—	—	—	Saturday Night at the Movies
2014	"Superstar"	—	—	—	—	Saturday Night at the Movies
2014	"Can't Take My Eyes Off You"	—	—	—	—	Saturday Night at the Movies
2015	"Something Good"	—	—	—	—	Sweet Soul Music
2015	"Sweet Soul Music"	—	—	—	—	Sweet Soul Music
2017	"Beauty and the Beast"	—	—	—	—	Non-album single
2017	"Happy Days"	—	—	—	—	Happy Days EP
2018	"You to Me Are Everything"	—	—	—	—	The Overtones
2018	"I Say a Little Prayer"	—	—	—	—	The Overtones
2018	"Stand Up"	—	—	—	—	The Overtones
2019	"September"	—	—	—	—	Non-album single
2019	"Dancing on the Ceiling"	—	—	—	—	Non-album single
2019	"Celebration"	—	—	—	—	Non-album single
2020	"You to Me Are Everything (Live)"	—	—	—	—	10
2021	"Gambling Man 2.0"	—	—	—	—	10
2021	"A Night to Remember"	—	—	—	—	Non-album single
2021	"Rose Tinted"	—	—	—	—	Non-album single
2022	"Sweet Caroline"	—	—	—	—	Non-album single
2023	"Christmas Everyday"	—	—	—	—	Non-album single
2024	"Ladies Night"	—	—	—	—	Non-album single
2024	"Turn Your Light On"	—	—	—	—	Non-album single
"—" denotes a recording that did not chart or was not released.
