= Cover Drive =

Barbadian band

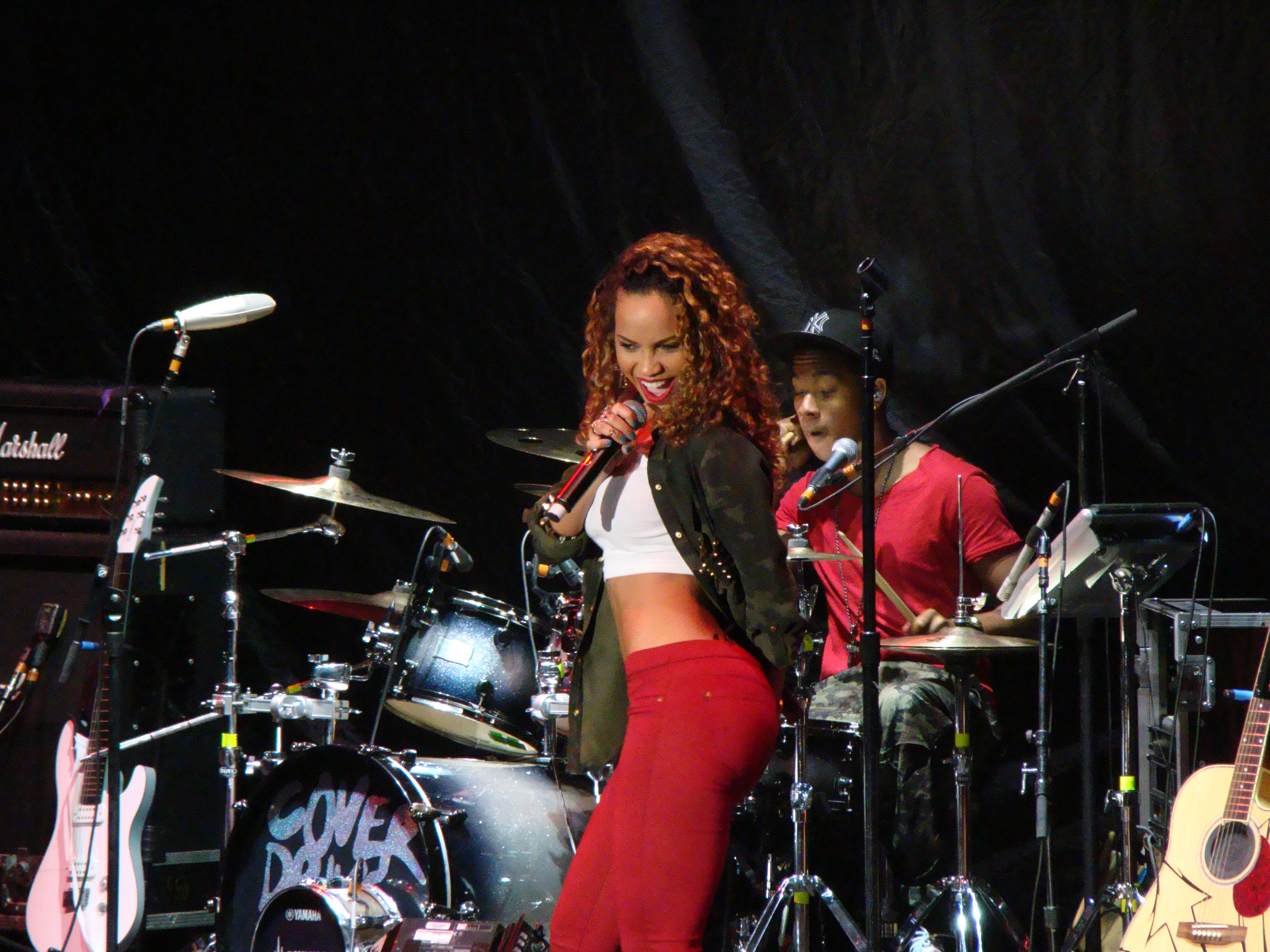

Background information
- Origin: Barbados
- Genres: Reggae; R&B; dancehall; soca; hip hop; pop; reggae fusion; dance
- Years active: 2012–2018
- Labels: Polydor; LAB Records; Cherrytree
- Past members: Amanda Reifer; T-Ray Armstrong; Barry 'Bar-Mon' Hill; Jamar Harding
- Website: wearecoverdrive.com

Cover Drive were a four-piece Barbadian band consisting of Amanda Reifer, T-Ray Armstrong, Barry "Bar-Man" Hill and Jamar Harding. They have gained commercial success in the United Kingdom. They are best known for their 2012 single "Twilight", which peaked atop the UK singles chart.

The band was signed by record label Global Talent, a division of Polydor Records. The band obtained one of its major breaks by performing as an opening act during Rihanna's Loud Tour. The band were featured in upcoming promotions by the Barbados Tourism Authority, an international tourist-marketing agency of the Barbados government. The group released their debut album Bajan Style on 7 May 2012 in the United Kingdom, peaking at number 14. "Lovesick Riddim" was announced as their lead single from their EP, Liming in Limbo on 13 December 2013. The group's second and final album Fall Forward was released on 10 April 2017. The group later disbanded in 2018.

== History ==
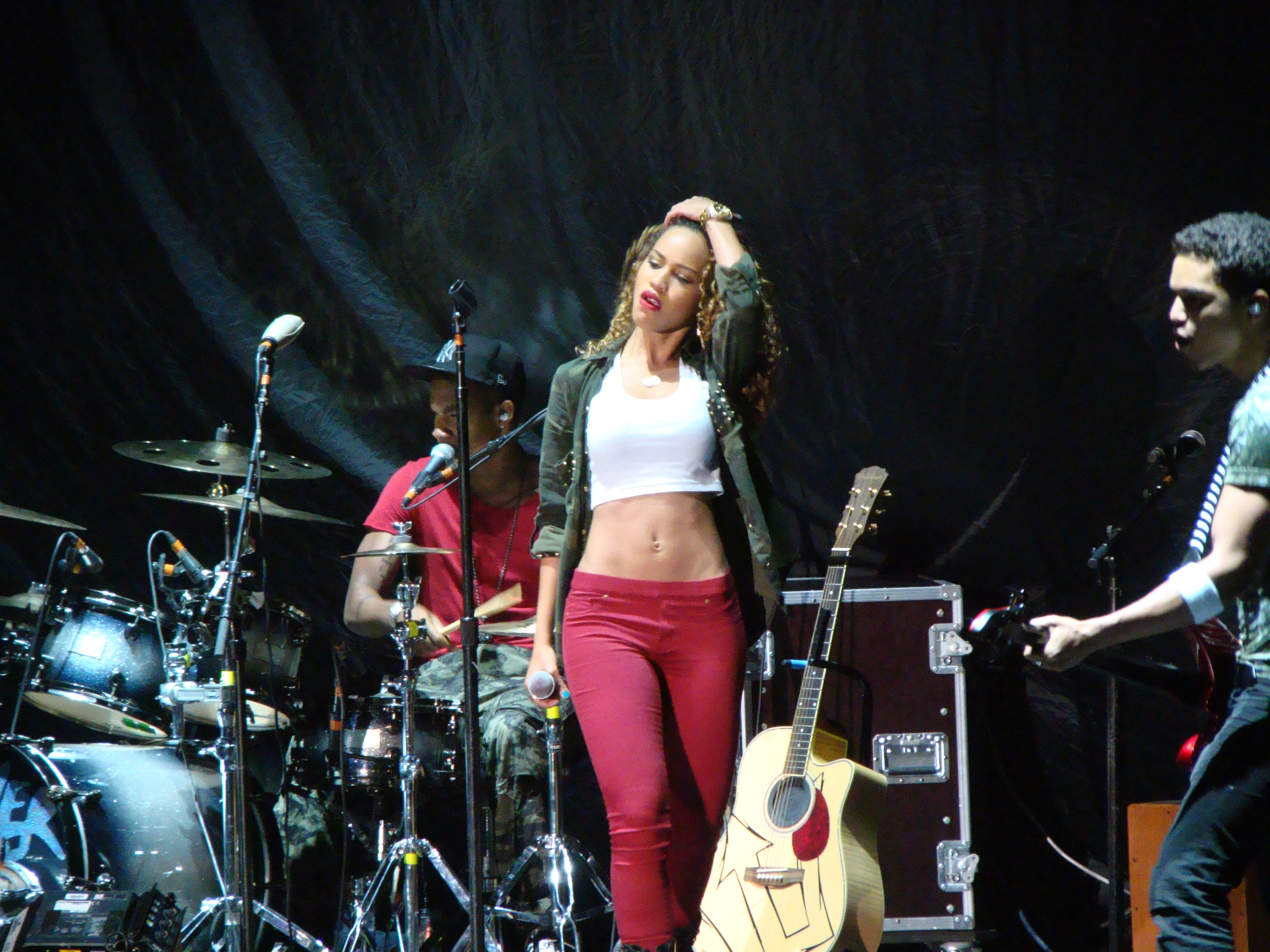
Stronger tour, Manchester Arena Cover Drive

=== 2010: Formation ===
The band formed in their native country Barbados. The band consisted of four members: lead singer Amanda Reifer; drummer/backing vocalist T-Ray Armstrong; keyboardist/guitarist Barry Hill; and bassist Jamar Harding. Reifer met Armstrong when she became his babysitter despite being only two years older, Armstrong was in the same year as Harding at school although they did not attend the same school, and Reifer met Hill at college because they were in the same year.

=== 2011–2012: Commercial success and Bajan Style ===
Cover Drive gained many subscribers on YouTube with videos of them covering popular songs. In April 2011, the band signed a publishing deal with Sony and a recording deal with Polydor Records. After the band was signed they began writing and recording material for their debut album. Whilst in the studio, they met American producer J. R. Rotem who produced their debut single, "Lick Ya Down", which was released on 28 August 2011. After receiving heavy airplay and support on both radio stations and music television channels in the United Kingdom, the song debuted and peaked at number 9 on the UK Singles Chart and number 3 on the UK R&B Singles Chart.

They later released their second single "Twilight" on 22 January 2012, which was their first single to chart in Ireland, debuting at number 40. The song peaked at number 1 on the UK iTunes chart within hours of its release. The song was produced by Quiz & Larossi. On 29 January 2012, "Twilight" debuted at number 1 on the charts in the United Kingdom for the week ending 4 February 2012. On 8 March 2012, they announced "Sparks" as the third single from the album. "Sparks" was released on 29 April and debuted and peaked at number 4 on the UK Singles Chart. Their debut album, Bajan Style, was released on 7 May 2012 and debuted on the UK Album Chart at number 14. The fourth release from Bajan Style, "Explode" was re-worked with vocals from former N-Dubz member, Dappy, and was released from the album on 26 August 2012, entering at number 29 on the UK Singles Chart.

The group also featured on Far East Movement's "Turn Up the Love", which was released on 21 June 2012. It peaked at number 13 on the UK Singles Chart. They toured with Kelly Clarkson on the UK & Ireland leg of her Stronger Tour.

=== 2013–18: Fall Forward and disbandment ===
A lyric video for a song called "All My Love" was uploaded to the band's official YouTube channel on 14 February 2013. The music video was uploaded to YouTube on 1 March 2013.

The band was featured in a May 2013 episode of the HGTV series House Hunters International as they searched Barbados for a house together as a band, preparing for their next album.

A lyric video for their lead single off of their EP, called "Lovesick Riddim", was uploaded to the band's official YouTube channel on 7 August 2013. The music video was uploaded to YouTube on 10 August 2013. Their EP, titled "Liming in Limbo", was a taster of what was to come on their second album, Fall Forward. The EP was released 13 December 2013.

Cover Drive released a song for Crop Over 2014 called "Dis Ain't Love". A lyric/music video was released via their YouTube account on 6 June 2014. Cover Drive also announced in June 2014 that they were recording the music video for the lead single off of their upcoming second single. It was later announced to be called "Love Junkie". A lyric video was uploaded on their YouTube account on 3 June. The music was uploaded on to Vevo on 27 June. The song was released on 27 July (UK/Europe) and 29 July (rest of world). The group released their long-awaited second studio album on 10 April 2017. The group disbanded in 2018. According to Reifer, she left the band because it was "not a healthy environment".

== Members ==
- Karen Amanda Reifer – lead vocals
- Barry Hill – guitar, keytar
- Jamar Harding – bass guitar, backing vocals
- Thomas Ray Armstrong (T-Ray) – drums, percussion, backing vocals, lead vocals

== Discography ==
=== Studio albums ===
- Bajan Style (2012)
- Fall Forward (2017)

=== EPs ===
- Liming in Limbo (2013)
