= Twilight (Cover Drive song) =

2012 debut single by Cover Drive

Single by Cover Drive

from the album Bajan Style
- B-side: "All About You"
- Released: 22 January 2012
- Length: 3:28
- Label: Polydor
- Songwriters: Andreas Romdhane; Josef Larossi; Ina Wroldsen; Karen Reifer; Thomas-Ray Armstrong; Jamar Harding; Barry Hill
- Producer: Quiz & Larossi

Cover Drive singles chronology
"Lick Ya Down" (2011)	"Twilight" (2012)	"Sparks" (2012)

Music video
- "Twilight" on YouTube

"Twilight" is a song by Barbados-based pop group Cover Drive. The song was written by the band with Swedish production team Quiz & Larossi and Ina Wroldsen. The song was released on 22 January 2012 as a digital download and CD single in the United Kingdom, taken from their debut album, Bajan Style. "Twilight" topped the UK Singles Chart and received a gold certification from the British Phonographic Industry (BPI) in October 2020.

== Chart performance ==
On the week ending 4 February 2012, "Twilight" debuted at number-one on the UK Singles Chart with sales of 76,109 copies. The position marked the group's second consecutive top 10 single after "Lick Ya Down" and first number-one single. The song has sold and streamed 400,000 units in the UK as of October 2020.

== Music video ==
A music video to accompany the release of "Twilight" was filmed. It features a cameo appearance by Survivor: Nicaragua contestant Brenda Lowe in a laundromat.

== Track listings ==
CD single
No.	Title	Length
1.	"Twilight"	3:28
2.	"All About You"	3:36

Digital download
No.	Title	Length
1.	"Twilight"	3:28
2.	"Twilight" (Nicola Fasano & Steve Forest club mix)	4:52
3.	"Twilight" (Nicola Fasano & Steve Forest Dirty Shade remix)	5:22
4.	"Twilight" (Deseca remix)	3:33
5.	"Twilight" (Ruff Loaderz remix)	7:09

== Charts ==
=== Weekly charts ===
Chart (2012)	Peak position
Belgium (Ultratip Bubbling Under Flanders)	70
Ireland (IRMA)	30
Japan Hot 100 (Billboard)	60
Scotland Singles (Official Charts)	3
Spanish Airplay (PROMUSICAE)	21
UK Singles (Official Charts)	1

=== Year-end charts ===
Chart (2012)	Position
UK Singles (OCC)	75

== Certifications and sales ==
Region	Certification	Certified units/sales
United Kingdom (BPI)	Gold	400,000^{‡}
^{‡} Sales+streaming figures based on certification alone.

== Release history ==
Region	Release date	Format	Label	Ref.
Ireland	20 January 2012	Digital download	Global Talent	
United Kingdom	22 January 2012	Digital download	Global Talent	
United Kingdom	23 January 2012	CD single	Global Talent	
Germany	4 May 2012	CD single	Polydor	
