= Explode (Cover Drive song) =

Single by Cover Drive featuring Dappy

from the album Bajan Style
- Released: 26 August 2012
- Recorded: 2011–2012
- Genre: Electropop, reggae fusion
- Length: 3:25
- Label: Polydor
- Songwriters: Karen Reifer, Thomas Ray Armstrong, Jamar Harding, Barry Hill, Costadinos Contostavlos, Steve Mac
- Producer: Steve Mac

Cover Drive singles chronology
"Turn Up the Love" (2012)	"Explode" (2012)	"All My Love" (2013)

Dappy singles chronology
"Rockstar" (2012)	"Explode" (2012)	"Good Intentions" (2012)

"Explode" is the fourth single to be released by Barbadian pop group Cover Drive. The song was released on 26 August 2012 as a digital download in the United Kingdom, taken from their debut studio album, Bajan Style. The single version of the track has been remixed to feature vocals from British grime rapper Dappy.

== Music video ==
A music video to accompany the release of "Explode" was first released on YouTube on 23 July 2012 at a total length of three minutes and fifty-four seconds. The video features the band performing the track in a club, while Dappy sits in the audience watching the performance.

== Track listing ==
Digital download
No.	Title	Length
1.	"Explode" (featuring Dappy)	3:25
2.	"Explode" (Moto Blanco Remix)	3:31
3.	"Explode" (Mike Delinquent Radio Edit)	4:29
4.	"Explode" (Acoustic Version)	3:18

== Chart performance ==
Chart (2012)	Peak Position
Ireland (IRMA)	27
Scottish Singles Sales (Official Charts)	27
UK Singles (Official Charts)	29

== Release history ==
Country	Release date	Format	Label
United Kingdom	26 August 2012	Digital download	Polydor Records
