= The Absolute Collection =

Greatest hits album by Garbage
- Released: November 2, 2012
- Recorded: 1994–2012; Madison, Wisconsin, Los Angeles, and Silverlake, California
- Genre: Alternative rock; electronica
- Label: Liberation Music; Stunvolume
- Producer: Garbage

Garbage chronology
Not Your Kind of People (2012)	The Absolute Collection (2012)	Strange Little Birds (2016)

The Absolute Collection is the second greatest hits album by American-Scottish alternative rock band Garbage. It was released in Australia and New Zealand on November 2, 2012 on their own label Stunvolume, via Liberation Music, and supersedes the band's previous major label compilation, Absolute Garbage. The album was released in advance of the band's 2013 tour dates throughout both countries.

The collection compiles a run of singles from the band's career, including the band's three Australian top twenty hits "Cherry Lips (Go Baby Go!)", "Breaking Up the Girl" and "Why Do You Love Me". It followed the release of their fifth studio album, Not Your Kind of People, which reached the top ten earlier in 2012. The Absolute Collection charted at #88 for a single week on the ARIA Charts.

In 2015, The Absolute Collection was remastered for iTunes. On this re-release, "#1 Crush" was replaced with the original version from Garbage: 20th Anniversary Super Deluxe Edition.

== Album package ==
The Absolute Collection track listing differs from 2007's worldwide release Absolute Garbage: it is not chronologically sequenced and the single inclusions favour towards the latter half of the band's career. Unlike the earlier compilation, The Absolute Collection includes both "Androgyny" and "Breaking Up the Girl", which reached #21 and #19 on the Australian singles chart respectively; inversely, it omits both "You Look So Fine" and the band's James Bond theme, "The World Is Not Enough". Both singles failed to chart in either Australia or New Zealand. The Absolute Collection also includes "Supervixen", a cut from the band's debut album, and their most recent single releases, "Blood for Poppies" and "Big Bright World", both from 2012's Not Your Kind of People.

In place of an extended bio, the band compiled a thanks list for the album booklet, while the album artwork was designed by Ryan Corey for Smog Design, from artwork created for the Not Your Kind of People booklet with a group shot image photographed by Paul Scala. The booklet also compiled a number of promotional photographs of the group taken over the course of their career by Stéphane Sednaoui, Ellen von Unwerth, Rankin, Autumn de Wilde, Warwick Saint and Joseph Cultice.

== Track listing ==
All tracks are written by Garbage, except where noted.

The Absolute Collection track listing
No.	Title	Length
1.	"Cherry Lips (Go Baby Go!)" (from Beautiful Garbage)	3:13
2.	"Stupid Girl" (from Garbage)	4:18
3.	"Androgyny" (from Beautiful Garbage)	3:11
4.	"I Think I'm Paranoid" (from Version 2.0)	3:39
5.	"Vow" (from Garbage)	4:32
6.	"Bleed Like Me" (from Bleed Like Me)	4:01
7.	"Supervixen" (from Garbage)	3:56
8.	"Blood for Poppies" (from Not Your Kind of People)	3:24
9.	"When I Grow Up" (from Version 2.0)	3:24
10.	"Why Do You Love Me" (from Bleed Like Me)	3:53
11.	"Big Bright World" (from Not Your Kind of People)	3:24
12.	"Special" (from Version 2.0)	3:47
13.	"Only Happy When It Rains" (from Garbage)	3:47
14.	"Shut Your Mouth" (from Beautiful Garbage)	3:27
15.	"Queer" (from Garbage)	4:37
16.	"Tell Me Where It Hurts" (from Absolute Garbage)	4:10
17.	"Breaking Up the Girl" (from Beautiful Garbage)	3:33
18.	"Milk" (from Garbage)	3:50
19.	"Push It" (from Version 2.0)	4:03
20.	"#1 Crush" (from the Romeo + Juliet soundtrack)	4:45

== Release history ==
Release formats for The Absolute Collection
Date	Territory	Label	Format(s)
November 2, 2012	Australia	Liberation Music; Stunvolume	CD; digital download
November 2, 2012	New Zealand	Liberation Music; Stunvolume	CD; digital download
October 2, 2015	Australia and New Zealand	Liberation Music; Stunvolume	Digital download (remastered)

== Charts ==
Weekly chart performance for The Absolute Collection
Chart (2012)	Peak position
Australian Albums (ARIA)	88
