= Beautiful Garbage World Tour =

2001–02 concert tour by Garbage

- World tour by Garbage
- Promotional poster for the tour
- Associated album: Beautiful Garbage
- Start date: October 10, 2001
- End date: December 10, 2002
- Legs: 11
- No. of shows: 72 in North America; 40 in Europe; 12 in Oceania; 4 in Asia; 1 in Caribbean; 129 total
- Supporting acts: Kelli Ali; Abandoned Pools; White Stripes; Mercury Rev; Raphaël; Queen Adreena; The Distillers; The Superjesus

Garbage concert chronology
- Version 2.0 World Tour (1998–1999); Beautiful Garbage World Tour (2001–2002); Bleed Like Me World Tour (2005)

The Beautiful Garbage World Tour was the third world concert tour cycle by American alternative rock group Garbage, which took the band throughout North and Central America, Europe, Japan, Australia and New Zealand in support of its third album Beautiful Garbage.

The Beautiful Garbage tour takes in headline performances, support performances for U2, Red Hot Chili Peppers and No Doubt, and slots at rock festivals and radio shows around the world. A number of notable acts supported Garbage throughout the run of the tour, including White Stripes, Kelli Ali, Queen Adreena and Abandoned Pools.

The tour was hampered by problems with the health of the band, with singer Shirley Manson suffering from throat problems and drummer Butch Vig being taken off sick twice, first with Hepatitis A and then with Bell's palsy. While some shows that Manson could not perform were cancelled, Vig was replaced at first with Matt Chamberlain and then with Matt Walker, to prevent disruption to the tour dates.

== Itinerary ==
Garbage marked the release of Beautiful Garbage by performing an in-store set in Chicago's Virgin Megastore on October 2, 2001. Garbage began touring the album as the opening act on the third leg of U2's Elevation Tour from October 12 in South Bend, Indiana, into Canada and through to 24th in New York City. Prior the last show, Vig collapsed from the effects of food poisoning and contracting Hepatitis A. Rather than cancelling the scheduled shows, Garbage recruited Matt Chamberlain to replace Vig for the remainder of the year. Garbage performed a series of underplayed headlining shows in Europe during November, beginning in Trondheim, Norway and ending in London, United Kingdom, on November 14. Garbage then returned to North America for the final Elevation tour Southern State shows, from Kansas City, Missouri on the 27th through to the last show in Miami, Florida on December 2. At the last show, U2 drummer Larry Mullen, Jr. played drums on "Only Happy When It Rains". Garbage wrapped up 2001 by performing at the Not So Silent Night radio festival in Los Angeles.

The Beautiful Garbage tour started in earnest in January 2002 in New Zealand and Australia, when Garbage joined the Big Day Out rock festival. In between the festival shows, Garbage headlined two concerts in Melbourne and Sydney. Garbage then spent ten days in Japan, performing four headline shows in Osaka and Tokyo.

Garbage launched a headline UK tour on April 1 in Portsmouth, a run that included an acoustic performance in Edinburgh and headlining MTV's 5 Night Stand. The band were supported on the UK dates by Kelli Ali. Beyond the UK, the run extended to a number of shows in Cologne, Amsterdam and Bourges. On April 19, Garbage returned to play a six-week itinerary of North American dates. Beginning in Toronto, the tour was routed down the Eastern Coast of America, over to the Midwest and then onto the West Coast. The jaunt ended with two night stint in Los Angeles. Garbage are supported by Abandoned Pools and on some shows, by White Stripes; during the tour, Vig is taken ill (later diagnosed as Bell's Palsy) and is replaced again by Matt Chamberlain. Garbage wrapped the North American tourdates on June 6 in Mexico City.

A month-long European trek began June 10 in Madrid, covering major rock festivals including Glastonbury and Roskilde. Matt Walker stood in for Vig for the rest of the summer. Garbage perform two shows in Nice and Lyon supporting Red Hot Chili Peppers, and a further two headlining French shows in Lille and Paris with Mercury Rev as support. The European leg ended at Espárrago Rock in Spain on July 12. Throughout the run, Manson is dogged by vocal problems, with her voice giving in at Roskilde, and leading to the cancellation of a few festival appearances. After a six-week break, Garbage return to the United Kingdom to perform their last European shows of the year – two intimate club gigs in London.

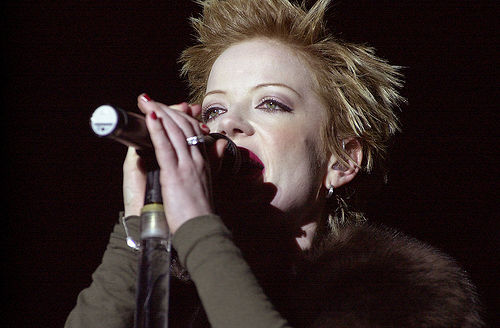
Shirley Manson performing onstage in New Orleans, Louisiana.

With Vig rejoining the ranks following his recovery period, Garbage headed to Australia to perform at the four date M-One festival across the country at the beginning of October. Garbage then joined No Doubt, who were promoting their Rock Steady album, to co-headline a trek around the United States. Support came from The Distillers. Kicking off on October 15 in West Kingston, Rhode Island, the tour was route down the Eastern Seaboard, and into Southern States before heading to the Pacific Northwest region and onto the American Southwest. The tour ended on November 27 in Long Beach, California.

Garbage went on to perform one further show, in George Town, Grand Cayman. Degree flew 200 competition winners to the Cayman Islands for a beachside Garbage concert. One competition winner was matched with a local for an episode of the reality show Blind Date and both got to meet the band.

== Broadcast and recordings ==
Butch Vig's drum-cam capture of Garbage onstage in Milwaukee.

Garbage: Live at Eagles Ballroom 2002 was a long-form live video DVD planned for release in 2002 by Garbage to document the North American leg of the Beautiful Garbage tour, utilizing footage shot on May 11, 2002, at the Eagles Ballroom in Milwaukee, Wisconsin. The footage likely went unreleased because the band's worldwide record label Mushroom Records UK was wound down before it was sold to Warner Music label EastWest in early 2003. An entry for the DVD release was included on the band's official website discography in April 2005; while Director Kenneth A. LaBarre uploaded a rough cut of "Special" to his YouTube channel on January 3, 2007. The video was an outtake from a 5-song demo DVD that LaBarre submitted to the band and their management at Q Prime in June 2002.

The origin of the DVD came from a pitch to the band and the band's management made by friend Author Jim Berkenstadt who along with LaBarre thought the band would be interested in recording a hometown concert for release, or archive for future use. The material would be owned and controlled by the band, unlike footage from previous TV appearances. The approach that LaBarre proposed, with the help of DP Bruce Johnson, was to create a "low impact, high quality digital video" document of the show using a mix of the latest Canon DV cameras and avoid using any cranes, jibs or mobile production trucks to maintain a small footprint and low budget. The footage was shot using eight cameras total. Two Canon Elura cameras with wide angle lenses were placed in and behind Butch Vig's drum kit, two Canon XL1 cameras set on tripods (centre and stage-right) were positioned in the balcony, two handheld Canon XL1 cameras (one operated by director LaBarre) were the pit in front of the stage, and a Canon XL1 handheld camera was run by DP Johnson on the stage-left. As of 2020, the full show has not been released though LaBarre still has all the audio and video tapes from the show archived for potential future use.

== Opening Acts ==
- Kelli Ali (Europe – Leg 2)
- Abandoned Pools (North America – Leg 3)
- White Stripes (Mesa)
- Mercury Rev (Europe – Leg 3)
- Raphaël (Europe – Leg 3 select dates)
- Queen Adreena (Europe – Leg 3 select dates)
- The Distillers (North America – Leg 4)
- The Superjesus (Australia)

== Setlists ==
North America (October 10–24, 2001)

1. "Push It"
2. "Special"
3. "I Think I'm Paranoid"
4. "Silence Is Golden"
5. "Drive You Home"
6. "Stupid Girl"
7. "Shut Your Mouth"
8. "Androgyny" initially; replaced by #"#1 Crush"
9. "'Til the Day I Die"
10. "Only Happy When it Rains"
11. "Cherry Lips"
Europe (November 2–14, 2001)

1. "Push It"
2. "Special"
3. "I Think I'm Paranoid"
4. "Androgyny"
5. "Silence is Golden"
6. "Drive You Home"
7. "Supervixen"
8. "Breaking Up the Girl"
9. "Not My Idea"
10. "'Til the Day I Die"
11. "When I Grow Up"
12. "Shut Your Mouth"
13. "Milk"
14. "Cherry Lips"
15. "Stupid Girl"
16. "Vow"

Encore:

1. "Thirteen"
2. "#1 Crush"
3. "Only Happy When it Rains"
North America (November 27 – December 2, 2001)

1. "Push It"
2. "Special"
3. "I Think I'm Paranoid"
4. "Silence is Golden"
5. "Drive You Home"
6. "#1 Crush"
7. "Stupid Girl"
8. "Shut Your Mouth"
9. "Breaking Up the Girl" initially; replaced by "'Til the Day I Die"
10. "Cherry Lips"
11. "Vow"
12. "Only Happy When it Rains"

For 2001 dates, the Felix da Housecat remix of "Androgyny" heralded the band onstage for the U2 support sets, which debuted Beautiful Garbage album tracks "Androgyny", "Cherry Lips", "Til The Day I Die", "Drive You Home" and "Shut Your Mouth" live onstage, as well as brought back "Silence Is Golden", which was debuted at the end of the Version 2.0 tour in 1999. For the European shows, the set was swollen with the debut of "Breaking Up the Girl" and returning album cuts such as "Not My Idea" and "Supervixen".

In 2002, an intro tape of the instrumental "Noziroh" by hip-hop producer Nobody preceded the band onstage, where they opened with "Push It". Returning album cuts for these dates included "Hammering In My Head" and "Temptation Waits", while also debuting "Cup of Coffee", "Parade", "So Like A Rose" and Version 2.0 b-side "Get Busy With the Fizzy". Cover versions performed throughout 2002 include Rolling Stone's "Wild Horses" and The Ramones' "I Just Want to Have Something to Do", as well as impromptu renditions of Kylie Minogue's "Can't Get You Out of My Head" and "Pipeline" by The Chantays. Two special concerts in London in August 2002 also saw resurrect debut album cut "As Heaven Is Wide", early b-sides "Lick the Pavement" and "Girl Don't Come" as well as perform the obscure "Soldier Through This" for the first time.

By the end of the run, the only Beautiful Garbage album tracks not performed live at some point were "Can't Cry These Tears", "Nobody Loves You" and "Untouchable". None of the era's b-sides were performed, although a live recording of "Wild Horses" was featured on the "Shut Your Mouth" single and a studio production of "I Just Wanna Have Something To Do" was recorded during the tour for the 2003 various artists album We're a Happy Family: A Tribute to Ramones.

== Tour dates ==
Date	City	Country	Venue
North America^{[A]}
October 10, 2001	South Bend	United States	Notre Dame Joyce Center
October 12, 2001	Montreal	Canada	Molson Centre
October 13, 2001	Hamilton	Canada	Copps Coliseum
October 15, 2001	Chicago	United States	United Center
October 16, 2001	Chicago	United States	United Center
October 24, 2001	New York City	United States	Madison Square Garden
Europe
November 2, 2001	Trondheim	Norway	International Student Festival
November 3, 2001	Oslo	Norway	Spektrum
November 4, 2001	Copenhagen	Denmark	Vega Musikkenshus
November 5, 2001	Hamburg	Germany	Große Freiheit 36
November 8, 2001	Paris	France	Élysée Montmartre
November 9, 2001	Brussels	Belgium	Halles de Schaerbeek/Hallen van Schaarbeek
November 14, 2001	London	United Kingdom	The Astoria
North America^{[A]}
November 27, 2001	Kansas City	United States	Kemper Arena
November 28, 2001	St. Louis	United States	Savvis Center
November 30, 2001	Atlanta	United States	Philips Arena
December 1, 2001	Tampa	United States	Ice Palace
December 2, 2001	Miami	United States	American Airlines Arena
December 13, 2001	Los Angeles	United States	Shrine Auditorium
Oceania
January 18, 2002	Auckland	New Zealand	Big Day Out, Mount Smart Stadium
January 20, 2002	Gold Coast	Australia	Gold Coast Parklands
January 22, 2002	Sydney	Australia	Hordern Pavilion
January 26, 2002	Sydney	Australia	Big Day Out, Sydney Showground
January 28, 2002	Melbourne	Australia	Big Day Out, Melbourne Showgrounds
January 29, 2002	Melbourne	Australia	Metro Nightclub
February 1, 2002	Adelaide	Australia	Big Day Out, Adelaide Showground
February 3, 2002	Perth	Australia	Big Day Out, Claremont Showground
Asia
February 6, 2002	Osaka	Japan	Zepp Osaka
February 8, 2002	Tokyo	Japan	Zepp Tokyo
February 9, 2002	Tokyo	Japan	Zepp Tokyo
February 12, 2002	Tokyo	Japan	Zepp Tokyo
Europe
April 1, 2002	Portsmouth	United Kingdom	Guildhall
April 2, 2002	Bristol	United Kingdom	Colston Hall
April 3, 2002	Wolverhampton	United Kingdom	Civic Hall
April 5, 2002	Edinburgh	United Kingdom	The Corn Exchange
April 6, 2002	Manchester	United Kingdom	The Apollo
April 7, 2002	London	United Kingdom	Brixton Academy
April 8, 2002	London	United Kingdom	MTV 5 Night Stand
April 10, 2002	Cologne	Germany	The Palladium
April 11, 2002	Amsterdam	Netherlands	Heineken Music Hall
April 13, 2002	Bourges	France	Printemps de Bourges
North America
April 19, 2002	Toronto	Canada	Kool Haus
April 20, 2002	Cleveland	United States	Agora Theatre
April 21, 2002	Detroit	United States	State Theatre
April 23, 2002	Plainview	United States	The Vanderbilt
April 24, 2002	New York	United States	Roseland Ballroom
April 26, 2002	Philadelphia	United States	Electric Factory
April 27, 2002	Boston	United States	EarthFest, MDC Hatch Shell
April 27, 2002	Boston	United States	The Avalon
April 29, 2002	Washington, D.C.	United States	9:30 Club
April 30, 2002	Washington, D.C.	United States	9:30 Club
May 1, 2002	Norfolk	United States	Norva
May 2, 2002	Myrtle Beach	United States	House of Blues
May 4, 2002	Nashville	United States	River Stages
May 5, 2002	Atlanta	United States	Music Midtown
May 8, 2002	Columbus	United States	Promowest Pavilion
May 9, 2002	Chicago	United States	Riviera Theater
May 10, 2002	Minneapolis	United States	First Avenue
May 11, 2002	Milwaukee	United States	Eagles Ballroom
May 13, 2002	St. Louis	United States	Pageant Theater
May 14, 2002	Kansas City	United States	Uptown Theater
May 16, 2002	Houston	United States	Verizon Wireless Theater
May 17, 2002	Dallas	United States	Bronco Bowl
May 18, 2002	Austin	United States	Austin Music Hall
May 20, 2002	Denver	United States	Paramount Theater
May 23, 2002	Los Angeles	United States	E3
May 24, 2002	Seattle	United States	Moore Theatre
May 25, 2002	Portland	United States	Roseland Theater
May 27, 2002	San Francisco	United States	Warfield Theatre
May 28, 2002	Las Vegas	United States	The Joint, Hard Rock Casino
May 29, 2002	Mesa	United States	Mesa Amphitheatre
May 31, 2002	San Diego	United States	SDSU Open Air Amphitheater
June 1, 2002	Los Angeles	United States	Wiltern Theatre
June 2, 2002	Los Angeles	United States	Wiltern Theatre
June 6, 2002	Mexico City	Mexico	National Auditorium
Europe
June 11, 2002	Salamanca	Spain	Wurtzburg
June 12, 2002	Madrid	Spain	La Riviera
June 13, 2002	Bilbao	Spain	Pavilion La Casilla
June 14, 2002	Barcelona	Spain	Razzmatazz
June 16, 2002	Imola	Italy	Heineken Jammin' Festival
June 17, 2002	Milan	Italy	Idroscalo
June 19, 2002^{[C]}	Nice	France	Palais Nikaïa
June 20, 2002^{[C]}	Lyon	France	Halle Tony Garnier
June 22, 2002	Scheeßel	Germany	Hurricane Festival
June 23, 2002	Neuhausen ob Eck	Germany	Southside Festival
June 25, 2002	Lille	France	Zénith de Lille
June 26, 2002	Paris	France	Le Zénith
June 28, 2002	Pilton	United Kingdom	Glastonbury Festival
June 29, 2002	Skellefteå	Sweden	Skellefteå Festival
June 30, 2002	Roskilde	Denmark	Roskilde Festival
July 2, 2002	St. Petersburg	Russia	Ice Palace
July 3, 2002	Moscow	Russia	DS Luzhniki
July 6, 2002	Ostend	Belgium	Seat Beach Rock Festival
July 7, 2002	Paris	France	Solidays Festival, Longchamps
July 10, 2002	Montreux	Switzerland	Montreux Jazz Festival
July 12, 2002	Jerez de la Frontera	Spain	Espárrago Rock
August 27, 2002	London	United Kingdom	Electric Ballroom
August 28, 2002	London	United Kingdom	Electric Ballroom
Oceania
October 5, 2002	Brisbane	Australia	M-One Festival, Queensland Sport & Athletics Centre
October 7, 2002	Sydney	Australia	M-One Festival, Sydney Showground
October 10, 2002	Adelaide	Australia	M-One Festival, Memorial Drive
October 12, 2002	Melbourne	Australia	M-One Festival, Docklands Stadium
North America^{[B]}
October 15, 2002	Kingston	United States	Ryan Center
October 17, 2002	Philadelphia	United States	First Union Spectrum
October 20, 2002	Worcester	United States	The Centrum
October 21, 2002	Uniondale	United States	Nassau Coliseum
October 23, 2002	East Rutherford	United States	Continental Airlines Arena
October 24, 2002	Baltimore	United States	Baltimore Arena
October 27, 2002	Jacksonville	United States	UNF Arena
October 29, 2002	Fort Lauderdale	United States	National Car Rental Center
October 30, 2002	Orlando	United States	TD Waterhouse Centre
November 1, 2002	Houston	United States	Reliant Arena
November 2, 2002	New Orleans	United States	Voodoo Music Experience
November 4, 2002	Dallas	United States	Smirnoff Music Centre
November 6, 2002	Denver	United States	Denver Coliseum
November 8, 2002	Nampa	United States	Idaho Center
November 9, 2002	Portland	United States	Rose Garden Arena
November 11, 2002	Seattle	United States	KeyArena
November 13, 2002	Sacramento	United States	ARCO Arena
November 14, 2002	San Jose	United States	Compaq Center
November 16, 2002	Phoenix	United States	Cricket Wireless Pavilion
November 19, 2002	Las Cruces	United States	Pan American Center
November 20, 2002	Albuquerque	United States	Tingley Coliseum
November 22, 2002	Long Beach	United States	Long Beach Arena
November 23, 2002	Long Beach	United States	Long Beach Arena
November 25, 2002	Bakersfield	United States	Rabobank Arena
November 26, 2002	San Diego	United States	Cox Arena
November 29, 2002	Long Beach	United States	Long Beach Arena
Caribbean
December 10, 2002	Hell	Grand Cayman	Degree Gel Party in Hell

Festivals and other miscellaneous performances

^{A} Supporting U2 on Elevation tour
^{B} Co-headlining with No Doubt on Rock Steady Tour
^{C} Supporting Red Hot Chili Peppers on By the Way tour

Cancellations and rescheduled shows

October 19, 2001	Baltimore	United States	Baltimore Arena	Cancelled
July 5, 2002	Weisen	Austria	Forestglade Festival	Cancelled
July 8, 2002	Luxembourg City	Luxembourg	Festival	Cancelled

== Box office score data ==
Date	Show	Venue	City	Tickets sold / available	Gross revenue
October 15–16, 2001	U2	United Center	Chicago	39,368 / 39,368 (100%)	$3,206,600
October 24, 2001	U2	Madison Square Garden	New York	18,385 / 18,385 (100%)	$1,568,790
November 30, 2001	U2	Philips Arena	Atlanta	18,535 / 18,535 (100%)	$1,504,925
December 1, 2001	U2	Ice Palace	Tampa	16,494 / 16,494 (100%)	$1,339,865
December 2, 2001	U2	American Airlines Arena	Miami	16,197 / 16,197 (100%)	$1,350,595
June 6, 2002	Garbage	Auditorio National	Mexico City	9,630 / 9,630 (100%)	$252,678
October 20, 2002	No Doubt/Garbage	Centrum Center	Worcester	10,899 / 13,000 (84%)	$368,380
October 21, 2002	No Doubt/Garbage	Nassau Coliseum	Uniondale	8,910 / 14,183 (64%)	$292,950
October 23, 2002	No Doubt/Garbage	Continental Airlines Arena	East Rutherford	10,562 / 13,362 (79%)	$335,901
November 13, 2002	No Doubt/Garbage	ARCO Arena	Sacramento	9,759 / 11,420 (85%)	$292,865
November 14, 2002	No Doubt/Garbage	HP Pavilion	San Jose	13,618 / 14,502 (94%)	$460,682
November 16, 2002	No Doubt/Garbage	Cricket Pavilion	Phoenix	13,048 / 20,058 (65%)	$335,460
November 26, 2002	No Doubt/Garbage	Cox Arena	San Diego	8,476 / 9,632 (88%)	$296,660
November 22–23, 29, 2002	No Doubt/Garbage	Long Beach Arena	Long Beach	39,219 / 39,219 (100%)	$1,372,665

== Promotional performances ==
Date	Show	Set
September 22, 2001	cd:uk	"Androgyny"
September 23, 2001	Popworld	"Androgyny"
Sept 2001	Pepsi Chart Show	"Androgyny"
Sept 2001	The Base	"Androgyny"
Sept 2001	Top of the Pops	"Androgyny"
October 2, 2001	Virgin Megastore	"Androgyny", "Cherry Lips"
October 8, 2001	Late Show with David Letterman	"Androgyny"
November 14, 2001	Later... with Jools Holland	"'Til the Day I Die", "Cherry Lips", "Stupid Girl"
November 16, 2001	Top of the Pops	"Cherry Lips", "Breaking Up the Girl"
Nov 2001	Evening Session	"Shut Your Mouth", "Drive You Home", "Cherry Lips", "Breaking Up the Girl"
Nov 2001	Morning Glory	"Cherry Lips"
December 8, 2001	The Tonight Show with Jay Leno	"Breaking Up the Girl"
January 5, 2002	cd:uk	"Cherry Lips"
January 6, 2002	Popworld	"Cherry Lips"
January 8, 2002	Pepsi Chart Show	"Cherry Lips"
January 24, 2002	Channel [V]	"Androgyny", "Cherry Lips"
March 15, 2002	cd:uk	"Breaking Up the Girl"
March 31, 2002	Re:covered	"Wild Horses", "Shut Your Mouth"
April 4, 2002	Up Close	"Special", "Vow", "I Think I'm Paranoid", "So Like a Rose", "Drive You Home", "Only Happy When it Rains", "Breaking up the Girl", "Wild Horses" (acoustic set)
June 3, 2002	The Tonight Show with Jay Leno	"Cherry Lips"
June 24, 2002	TV Total	"Shut Your Mouth"
August 27, 2002	Kerrang! Awards	"Shut Your Mouth"
August 29, 2002	Top of the Pops	"Shut Your Mouth"
October 8, 2002	Rove Live	"Shut Your Mouth"
November 15, 2002	101.5 Jamz	"I Think I'm Paranoid", "Drive You Home", "Only Happy When it Rains" (acoustic set)
February 23, 2003	MusiCares Person of the Year	"Pride (In the Name of Love)"
