= Shut Your Mouth (song) =

2002 single by Garbage

Single by Garbage

from the album Beautiful Garbage
- B-side: "Sex Never Goes Out of Fashion"; "April Tenth"; "I'm Really Into Techno"
- Released: June 24, 2002
- Recorded: April 2000 – May 2001
- Studio: Smart Studios; Madison, Wisconsin, US
- Genre: Alternative rock, electronica, post-grunge, hip hop
- Length: 3:26
- Label: Mushroom Records UK
- Songwriter: Garbage
- Producer: Garbage

Garbage singles chronology
"Breaking Up the Girl" (2002)	"Shut Your Mouth" (2002)	"Why Do You Love Me" (2005)

Alternative cover
- UK CD singles and collector's wallet.

"Shut Your Mouth" is a 2001 alternative rock song by Garbage, written and recorded for their third studio album Beautiful Garbage. "Shut Your Mouth" was the album opener; it was also released as its fourth and final single.

== Composition and recording ==
"Shut Your Mouth" was written and recorded at Garbage's own Smart Studios in Madison, Wisconsin during the year-long sessions that culminated in their third album Beautiful Garbage. "Shut Your Mouth" was one of the first songs Garbage completed; the genesis of the song came from the band setting up their instruments and playing music for three hours, while Manson spontaneously sang. "It came from Garbage attempting to do a funk jam," Butch Vig recalled, "and then Shirley went into the vocal booth and this Patti Smith-style stream-of-consciousness vocal came out". Vig later described "Shut Your Mouth" as "Sly & The Family Stone on quaaludes. Lyrically, Shirley Manson explained, "In a general sense, it's about keeping your own counsel. There are so many opinions out there and misinformation and everybody's got their own agenda".

The band created a wah-wah guitar sound for the intro of "Shut Your Mouth" by recording a 1955 Les Paul Junior through an old DigiTech Whammy pedal into a Matchless Hurricane/Marshall amplifier 4x12 setup. Session musician Daniel Shulman worked on "Shut Your Mouth" during the first of his two visits to Smart Studios to work on the album. He quickly laid down a riff for the chorus which used a lot of common tones throughout the chord progressions of the song. However, Shulman spent a long time working on a "funky and busy" part for the verses. All the bass guitar parts on "Shut Your Mouth" were performed on a Music Man Sabre bass. Butch Vig recorded a funk jam for the middle of the song on a Drum Workshop kit; he then cut and pasted random beats using Pro Tools editing software to create a jarring percussive effect. "It was just sort of a straight pattern, and without even listening to it I started dropping beats in other spots. Then I just ran through that section, and it was pretty messed up. But it had a much more interesting... it's more of a breakdown section," Vig recalled, "I actually tried notating the recorded version, and it was like some insane piece of music." Vig used a thirty-year-old Roger Meyer limiter to saturate the drum sounds on "Shut Your Mouth" ("...to make them sound thrashy").

The majority of the recorded work on Beautiful Garbage was to analog tracked through a Trident A Range mixing console; then fed into Pro Tools for recording overdubs, editing and mixing. The band's engineer, Billy Bush would then print a stereo mix of the Pro Tools tracks to two-inch tape and then add more overdubs to it. As a whole on Beautiful Garbage, Manson's main vocals were generally not treated to the extent that they had on Garbage's first two albums; however her vocal on "Shut Your Mouth" was: the band subjected her takes to a number of Pro Tools plug-ins such as GRM Tools' Band Pass and Wave Mechanics' Soundblender.

On October 10, 2001, "Shut Your Mouth" was debuted live by Garbage in Notre Dame, Indiana, during the band's first support slot on U2's Elevation Tour. The song was performed at almost every show on the Beautiful Garbage tour; at one Osaka, Japan performance in February 2002, Garbage replaced the verse riff with one from AC/DC's "Back in Black".

In 2007, "Shut Your Mouth" was remastered and included on Garbage's greatest hits album Absolute Garbage.

== Single release ==
On April 8, 2002, "Shut Your Mouth" was announced as the fourth single from Beautiful Garbage by Shirley Manson herself, during a Garbage concert broadcast live throughout Europe on MTV. The band had already pre-empted active single promotion by recording both "Shut Your Mouth" and a cover of Rolling Stones' 1971 single "Wild Horses" for Re:Covered, a new BBC Choice music show where contemporary artists performed their new single and an old classic. The show was scheduled to air in June, when Mushroom Records UK had planned to release "Shut Your Mouth" across Europe to coincide with Garbage's booked Glastonbury performance and European tour. After the failure of third album single, "Breaking Up the Girl", and despite promotional discs already having been distributed, Mushroom cancelled the UK's June release date of "Shut Your Mouth".

PIAS Recordings released "Shut Your Mouth" in Germany on June 24 to coincide with the band's German tour dates. The single was released a CD maxi featuring b-side "Happiness Pt.2" and two live tracks: "Wild Horses" and "Only Happy When it Rains". Garbage made their first live appearance on a German television show on June 24, performing "Shut Your Mouth" on TV total, while the animated music video for "Shut Your Mouth" had begun airing on MTV networks from June 18. PIAS then issued the single in other European territories from July 8.

Garbage regrouped at the end of August 2002 to actively promote "Shut Your Mouth" in the UK with two club dates at London's Electric Ballroom (which were filmed for BBC documentary series Roadies); the band performed the single on August 27 at that year's Kerrang! Awards, and completed two pre-records for both Top Of The Pops and Popworld to be broadcast nearer the release date. Manson also appeared on breakfast show RI:SE to discuss the song, while Mushroom ran print ads for the single in Kerrang! and NME music magazines. Rejecting the artwork used for the single in Europe, Mushroom commissioned a new photoshoot so that the single cover would feature Manson's image (this was a first for Garbage, who had never appeared on the covers of their singles or albums before). Mushroom also commissioned new remixes and a live music video for the UK release; the video debuting online and on Kerrang! TV on September 16.

Mushroom Records finally released "Shut Your Mouth" in the UK on September 23; the single was marketed as a three CD single set, each in card sleeves, with a card wallet with the first disc to store the whole set. Each disc was strictly limited to 5,000 copies. Spread across the formats were three new b-sides exclusive to the UK release of "Shut Your Mouth", Garbage having written and recorded them in Montreux, Switzerland while touring Europe, two new remixes of "Shut Your Mouth", and on the third disc, their live recording of "Wild Horses". This last disc was released in conjunction with Blaze Television and BBC Worldwide, due to the licensing arrangements made by the BBC to feature "Wild Horses" on Re:Covered earlier that year. On September 29, "Shut Your Mouth" charted at #20. This position was the highest reached by any of the four Beautiful Garbage singles on the UK Singles Chart. The following week, "Shut Your Mouth" dropped out of the Top 75; this was the first instance in the fifty-year history of the UK Singles Chart where a Top Twenty track did so.

FMR released "Shut Your Mouth" in Australia on September 2 in its original format configuration; a single CD maxi featuring the same b-sides and live tracks as in the European release; pre-empting an Australian Tour Edition re-release of the Beautiful Garbage on September 16. "Shut Your Mouth" peaked at number 74 on the ARIA Singles Chart, spending three weeks within the top 100. Garbage's world tour returned to Australia the following month; on October 8, the band performed "Shut Your Mouth" on talk show Rove.

In October 2002, Garbage returned to perform a co-headlining tour of North America with No Doubt and The Distillers. Although Interscope chose not to service any further singles from Beautiful Garbage in the United States, Universal Music Canada sent promotional discs of "Shut Your Mouth" to alternative rock stations across the country. Vancouver radio station 99.3 The Fox had been playing "Shut Your Mouth" since the release of Beautiful Garbage a year earlier. Interscope, however, licensed "Shut Your Mouth" to the soundtrack of the PlayStation 2 racing game World Rally Championship.

"Shut Your Mouth" was retained in Garbage's live set for 2005's Bleed Like Me tour, 2012-13's Not Your Kind Of People World Tour and 2016's Strange Little Birds tour. Along with "Cherry Lips", it was one of the only two tracks from Beautiful Garbage to be performed on all three tours. In August 2005, Garbage teamed up with Canadian electroclash musician Peaches to perform at AmsterJAM, a mash-up rock festival held at Randall's Island, NY. "Shut Your Mouth" was performed by both artists mixed with Peaches' single "Shake Yer Dix".

== Music videos ==
Garbage in the first version of the animated "Shut Your Mouth" video.

Two music videos were completed for "Shut Your Mouth". The first was a stiff 2D/3D animated promo, directed by Henry Moore Selder across May/June 2002. Garbage approached Selder to direct the video after being impressed with his videos for The Hives ("Die, Alright!" and "Hate to Say I Told You So"). The video concept is Manson's plea to the press to stop meddling in her private life, interpreted by her featuring as a guest on a Letterman/Springer-style talk show. The square characters are meant to look 'anti-3D'; achieved by removing the smoothness and perfection in the software, to give a jerky and organic look. Hand-drawn images of the band were then mixed in.

Four people, including Selder, from production company RealA worked on the video for a month. After the video was first broadcast online, the video was re-edited to suit the band. Marker, particularly, did not like his animation. The second edit, where Marker was redesigned with a Terminator-style look, was broadcast across Europe from July 5.

Neither Garbage nor Mushroom Records were pleased with the animated video, and commissioned a second video for the singles UK release. With a small £10,000 budget for the video, it was decided a live video would be released, but the label offered a few up and coming directors the chance to remix some footage or give it a different spin. Existing live footage filmed by MTV in London and by WDR in Cologne filmed at two shows in April 2002 was used to create an initial live cut.

The concept behind the Bloomberg-style data screens was to use them as a platform to show the footage in an unusual format and to illustrate ideas within the songs lyrics with animation. The idea came from the production team seeing a large LCD outside Waterloo station, the image shown became distorted when viewed up close. A number of shots were re-played through a 20-foot video wall in a Portsmouth warehouse and filmed on digibeta for the distorted effect. This footage was combined in the final edit of the video, which was completed in August 2002 and screened a few days after.

Both versions of the "Shut Your Mouth" video were made commercially available in QuickTime format on both the enhanced CD singles of the "Shut Your Mouth" UK release. A remastered version of the Live Version of the "Shut Your Mouth" video was included on Garbage's 2007 greatest hits DVD Absolute Garbage, and made available as a digital download via online music services the same year.

== Remixes ==
Mushroom commissioned multiple remixes of "Shut Your Mouth" for the UK single release: an nu-disco rework from Italian producers Francesco de Bellis & Mario Pierro, known as Jolly Music, and a rock-led arrangement by Jagz Kooner, formerly of The Sabres of Paradise were included on the CD single sets. A further remix produced by Ken Reay was included on a white label 12" release distributed for club play. Garbage's tour/session drummer Matt Walker also made his own "Shut Your Mouth" remix, which he uploaded to YouTube in 2013.

The CD format of Beautiful Garbage contained an enhanced element where users could remix four tracks from the album, of which "Shut Your Mouth" was one. Created in conjunction with Sonic Foundry, using a customized version of their drag-and-drop ACID Pro music sequencer software, the remixes utilized samples and loops cut from the track masters. The enhanced section could be accessed when the user was online; a simplified version of the software featuring only "Androgyny" loops was accessible when the user was offline.

== Critical reception ==
"Shut Your Mouth" received a mostly positive reception from music critics upon the release of Beautiful Garbage. In a review for Q, Ian Griffiths wrote "Arch opener "Shut Your Mouth" is a bile-laden winner from the same school as "Stupid Girl" while in her review for Rock Sound, Victoria Durham commented on the tracks "bombastic sass". In Peter Murphy's album preview for Hot Press, he wrote, "In an album of hot colours and dark corners, "Shut Your Mouth" is designer dirty-in-your-ear funk with free-flowing lyrics and what sound like purloined AC/DC riffs."

== Track listings ==
- Australian CD maxi FMR MUSH106CDS
- European CD maxi Play It Again, Sam MUSH106CDM
1. "Shut Your Mouth" – 3:25
2. "Happiness Pt. 2" – 5:57
3. "Only Happy When it Rains" (live) – 4:15
4. "Wild Horses" (live) – 4:53
- UK CD1 Mushroom MUSH106CDS
1. "Shut Your Mouth" – 3:25
2. "Sex Never Goes Out of Fashion" – 3:54
3. "Shut Your Mouth" (Jolly Music scary mix) – 5:22
4. "Shut Your Mouth" (video) – 3:25
- UK CD2 Mushroom MUSH106CDSX
1. "Shut Your Mouth" – 3:25
2. "April Tenth" – 4:25
3. "Shut Your Mouth" (Jagz Kooner vocal mix) – 4:39
4. "Shut Your Mouth" (live video) – 3:27
- UK CD3 Mushroom MUSH106CDSXXX
1. "Shut Your Mouth" – 3:25
2. "I'm Really Into Techno" – 1:22
3. "Wild Horses" (live) – 4:53

== Charts ==
Chart performance for "Shut Your Mouth"
Chart (2002)	Peak position
Australia (ARIA)	74
Europe (Eurochart Hot 100)	84
Scotland Singles (OCC)	24
UK Singles (OCC)	20
UK Indie (OCC)	3

== Release history ==
Release history and formats for "Shut Your Mouth"
Territory	Release date	Record label	Format
Germany	June 24, 2002	PIAS	CD maxi
Europe	July 8, 2002	PIAS	CD maxi
Australia	September 8, 2002	FMR	CD maxi
United Kingdom	September 23, 2002	Mushroom Records UK	3×CD single set
Canada	October 2002	Interscope/Universal Music Canada	Airplay only
