= Absolute Garbage =

Greatest hits album by Garbage
- Released: July 23, 2007
- Recorded: 1994–2007
- Studios: Smart, Madison, Wisconsin (Note: Tracks 1–5); Kung Foo Sound, Los Angeles (Note: Track 17); GrungeIsDead, Silver Lake, California
- Genres: Alternative rock; trip hop; grunge
- Length: 72:43
- Labels: A&E (worldwide): Almo Sounds; Geffen; UM^{e}; (North America)
- Producers: David Arnold; Garbage; Nellee Hooper; John King; Jeremy Wheatley

Garbage chronology
Bleed Like Me (2005)	Absolute Garbage (2007)	Not Your Kind of People (2012)

Singles from Absolute Garbage
- 1. "Tell Me Where It Hurts" Released: July 16, 2007

Absolute Garbage is a greatest hits album by American rock band Garbage. It was released worldwide on July 23, 2007, through Warner Music imprint A&E Records with a North American release through Almo Sounds, Geffen Records, and Universal Music Enterprises the following day. The compilation was issued while the band was on hiatus following a one-off reformation to perform at a benefit concert early in the year.

The album includes remastered versions of 16 of the band's singles which run chronologically in the track listing, as well as "Tell Me Where It Hurts", a new track recorded especially for inclusion on the compilation which was released as a single. Absolute Garbage was released on CD and as a special edition which included a bonus disc of remixes. Additionally, a DVD was released featuring 16 music videos, as well as an hour-long documentary film titled Thanks for Your Uhh, Support, containing footage filmed backstage and behind the scenes, archive live performances, and interviews spanning the band's entire career up to that point.

== Background ==
The band's drummer Butch Vig felt that Absolute Garbage would be "a full stop on part of our career", marking the band's movement to a new part of their development, rather than simply a contractual obligation, while guitarist Duke Erikson stated that "putting out a collection of our singles would be a good way to stay busy without working so hard". However, singer Shirley Manson revealed in 2012 that the compilation emerged from a demand by the band's UK label A&E Records in order to meet their quarterly requirements.

When Garbage began to collate the material for Absolute Garbage, it transpired that the analog masters of their eponymous debut album had been lost. Neither of the band's record labels had them, and after further searching, the band established that none of the mastering facilities they had used had stored them either. Vig and audio engineer Billy Bush were able to track down an archived, but rather incomplete and damaged, set of 16-bit 44.1kHz safety DAT mixes. Despite the backups being far from an optimal situation, mastering engineer Emily Lazar at The Lodge in New York City was able to reverse engineer the missing songs from the damaged archive. Lazar used some alternate versions of the songs when completing the final master. Her assistant, Joe LaPorta, mastered and edited the remixes for the special edition.

Eschewing the Midwestern location of their Wisconsin-based Smart Studios, Garbage chose to record new material for the album at GrungeIsDead, Vig's California-located home recording studio. The band members had been sharing ideas over the internet prior to the sessions, and were keen to record them; vocalist Shirley Manson had come up with the song title "Tell Me Where It Hurts" a few years previously, and had matched newly written lyrics with a Burt Bacharach-style string arrangement that the band had created via email correspondence. After producing an electric guitar-heavy version of "Tell Me Where It Hurts", Garbage recorded a second mix of the track with more emphasis on the strings and recruited their former touring bassist, Daniel Shulman, to perform bass guitar on the song. The band completed another three songs during the sessions, including "Betcha" (Vig: "it's fuzzed up"), "Girls Talk Shit" ("pretty cool sounding, lots of fast pizzicato guitars and cellos"), and "All the Good in This Life", which Vig described as "kinda Pink Floyd-y".

Vig had created a new version of their song "Bad Boyfriend", which had opened their Bleed Like Me album, when he had been updating his home studio the previous year. Keeping to the Garbage formula of incorporating non-musical sounds in their work, Vig used a digital recorder to capture the sound of his baby daughter's swing in motion as a percussive loop. Thinking that the compilation would benefit from the inclusion of a new remix, Vig presented his rework to Manson and Erikson who had been unaware of the new version. Both agreed that "Bad Boyfriend" should be included, but rather than solicit an outside producer, Vig spent a few days finishing the mix. Inversely, Garbage recruited production team Jeremy Wheatley and Brio Tellefario to create a new version of Bleed Like Me's track "It's All Over but the Crying"; the band hoped the song would be a possible second single. A rock version of Version 2.0's "Push It" was completed by producer Chris Sheldon.

The group argued over the album's running order, eventually dropping a few of their singles, including "Androgyny" (from Beautiful Garbage) after Manson objected to its inclusion, before finalizing on the 18 tracks that the group believed represented their best work. Vig oversaw the liner notes and thanks list for the album: "It's been a burden because we're encompassing what we've done over the last 10 years in one short paragraph"; music journalist Peter Murphy composed a biography on the band's history for the booklet, while the album artwork was designed by Tom Hingston Studio—a foil blocked silkscreen image photographed by David Hughes. The booklet also compiled a number of promotional photographs of the group taken over the course of their career by Stéphane Sednaoui, Ellen von Unwerth, Rankin, Pat Pope, Warwick Saint, and Joseph Cultice.

The band compiled an hour-long documentary titled Thanks for Your Uhh, Support for the DVD release, featuring footage filmed backstage and behind-the-scenes, and archive live performances and interviews spanning the band's entire career up to that point. In addition to interviews with the members of Garbage, the documentary also features Duke Erikson's daughter Roxy, Madison club owner and friend Jay Moran, engineer Billy Bush, former touring bassists Daniel Shulman and Eric Avery, Foo Fighters' Dave Grohl and Taylor Hawkins, White Stripes' Jack White, and former MTV News anchor Kurt Loder. Region 0 pressings of the DVD contained all 16 music videos to accompany the singles featured on the CD formats, with the exception of "#1 Crush", for which no music video was filmed. Region 1 releases did not include the video for "Tell Me Where It Hurts".

In 2012, Garbage stated that the album was released as a contractual obligation to Warner Music: "This was the final straw that broke our backs", Manson said. "The record company we had been sold to in the U.K. demanded that we release a 'greatest hits' in order to meet their quarterly requirements. We were not in a position to stop it. As a result, they shoved this collection out with no promotion whatsoever. It was right there and then that we realized how crazy and out of whack things had gotten." Garbage remained on hiatus for a further three years until regrouping to record their fifth studio album, Not Your Kind of People, released in 2012.

== Release and promotion ==
At the end of 2005's Bleed Like Me World Tour, Garbage disbanded to go on a hiatus. A month later, music retailer HMV's UK website listed a Greatest Hits compilation for release the following year. By January 2006, the title changed to Absolute Garbage. On November 10, a press release from Warner Music Group announced a March 19, 2007, UK release date for the album, while NME reported that the album would be proceeded by a single on March 5. In January 2007, Vig became the first band member to publicly confirm the project: "We've been working on [Absolute Garbage] for a while". On May 11, the band's website unveiled the artwork for Absolute Garbage, and on May 22, confirmed the album's track listing, physical formats and an initial July 16–17 street date. The date was later moved back a week due to "production issues" concerning the North American DVD.

The promotional campaign for Absolute Garbage was launched in late May 2007, when Geffen Records updated Garbage's Myspace profile streaming audio player to include the album's lead single "Tell Me Where It Hurts" and the remix of "Bad Boyfriend", while the music video for "Tell Me Where It Hurts" premiered on Channel 4's Video Exclusive slot in the United Kingdom on May 28. Radio edits of the Guitars Up and orchestral versions of "Tell Me Where It Hurts" were serviced to radio in early June. In the United Kingdom, the song was playlisted by XFM Scotland Upfront, Radio Forth and was C-Listed on BBC Radio 2 for five weeks. The alternative rock remix of "Push It" was playlisted by XFM for three weeks. A&E Records released "Tell Me Where It Hurts" on seven-inch vinyl, DVD and CD single (featuring "Betcha" as the B-side) on July 16 in the United Kingdom, where it debuted at number 50 on the UK Singles Chart. Manson complained that the release was "shoved out with no promotion whatsoever", declaring that it was the moment the band "realized how crazy and out of whack things had gotten", inspiring them to work independently afterwards.

On July 23, 2007, Absolute Garbage was released in the United Kingdom, with the North American street date following a day later. The digital format includes "All the Good in This Life" as an iTunes Store exclusive bonus track. In 2012, Absolute Garbage was superseded by a revamped greatest hits set titled The Absolute Collection, which was released in Australia and New Zealand on November 2 via Liberator Music.

== Critical reception ==
Professional ratings
Aggregate scores
Source	Rating
Metacritic	69/100
Review scores
Source	Rating
AllMusic	3.5/5 stars
Digital Spy	4/5 stars
Kerrang!	KK
Mojo	3/5 stars
musicOMH	4/5 stars
PopMatters	9/10
Q	3/5 stars
Slant Magazine	4/5 stars
Stylus Magazine	B
Uncut	3/5 stars

Absolute Garbage received generally positive reviews from music critics. At Metacritic, which assigns a normalized rating out of 100 to reviews from mainstream publications, the album received an average score of 69, based on 12 reviews. Sal Cinqumani of Slant Magazine gave a positive overview of the compilation, writing that the album "serves as an anthropological study of the musical relics of a bygone era", while Laila Hassani of Heat summed up her five-star review by writing, "Few modern female-fronted rock bands stand the test of time, but this reminds you why, along with Gwen Stefani's No Doubt, Garbage are one of them." A reviewer for Instinct wrote "this hits collection is loaded with songs best described as massive... you'll find something to love here". Jaime Gill, in a review for BBC Music, felt that "Absolute Garbage is a fine legacy, the sound of a briefly brilliant and always interesting band" and that overall the album "sounds like no other greatest hits you own." Digital Spy's Nick Levine wrote, "By wrapping their nut-grabbing hooks and transcendent melodies in layers of gutsy guitars, Garbage managed to make pop music for people who thought they didn't like pop music. For that reason, whatever happens next, they deserve to be remembered fondly."

Many reviewers felt that the chronological running order put more emphasis on the band's well-regarded earlier periods. "The selection of songs perhaps indicates Garbage view their career the same way many fans do", wrote Victoria Durham of Rock Sound, and "that they never quite managed [to match] the brilliance of their early work." Johnny Dee of Classic Rock expressed, "The later material here sounds formulaic, however, new song "Tell Me Where It Hurts" adds strings to the dynamic and sits well alongside their peerless early material". AllMusic reviewer Stephen Thomas Erlewine considered that despite ignoring 2000s singles such as "Run Baby Run", "it already seems that the comp has lingered far longer than necessary on the last stage of Garbage's career", in contrast to the debut album singles "still sounding sleek and alluring." Kerrang! magazine's Tom Byrant also felt that Garbage's work had dated, expounding, "Something that was once so much a part of the Zeitgeist has remained rooted to the era it marked, untranslatable across the millennial divide. Still, songs like 'Stupid Girl' and 'Only Happy When It Rains' [...] maintain an urgency and spite that sees their intent remain intact." Billboard writer Kerri Mason praised the choice of remixes on the special edition: "the band continually brought the best of dance's best producers, not one of the thirteen tracks is a throwaway." Ben Hogwood of musicOMH called the compilation a "deserved retrospective", further noting that "the best way to get to know Garbage is through their albums, which demonstrate their strength in depth. In particular the self-titled debut and Version 2.0 withstand a heavy hammering on any stereo."

== Commercial performance ==
Absolute Garbage debuted at number 68 on the Billboard 200, selling 11,000 copies in its first week. As of August 2008, it had sold 66,000 copies in the United States. The album debuted at number 11 on the UK Albums Chart with 13,372 units sold in its first week.

== Track listing ==
All tracks are written by Garbage, except where noted.

Absolute Garbage track listing
No.	Title	Writer(s)	Album	Length
1.	"Vow"		Garbage (1995)	4:32
2.	"Queer"		Garbage	4:37
3.	"Only Happy When It Rains"		Garbage	3:47
4.	"Stupid Girl"	Garbage; Mick Jones; Joe Strummer; Topper Headon; Paul Simonon	Garbage	4:18
5.	"Milk"		Garbage	3:50
6.	"#1 Crush" (Nellee Hooper mix)		Romeo + Juliet soundtrack (1996)	4:45
7.	"Push It"		Version 2.0 (1998)	4:03
8.	"I Think I'm Paranoid"		Version 2.0	3:39
9.	"Special"		Version 2.0	3:47
10.	"When I Grow Up"		Version 2.0	3:24
11.	"You Look So Fine"		Version 2.0	5:22
12.	"The World Is Not Enough"	David Arnold (music); Don Black (lyrics)	The World Is Not Enough soundtrack (1999)	3:58
13.	"Cherry Lips (Go Baby Go!)"		Beautiful Garbage (2001)	3:13
14.	"Shut Your Mouth"		Beautiful Garbage	3:27
15.	"Why Do You Love Me"		Bleed Like Me (2004)	3:53
16.	"Bleed Like Me"		Bleed Like Me	4:01
17.	"Tell Me Where It Hurts"		New recording	4:10
18.	"It's All Over But the Crying" (remix)		Original version from Bleed Like Me	3:49
Total length:				72:43

iTunes Store bonus track
No.	Title	Album	Length
19.	"All the Good in This Life"	"Tell Me Where It Hurts" single	4:20

Special edition bonus disc: Garbage Mixes
No.	Title	Length
1.	"The World Is Not Enough" (Unkle remix)	5:01
2.	"When I Grow Up" (Danny Tenaglia remix - incorrectly credited to Jagz Kooner)	5:23
3.	"Special" (Brothers in Rhythm remix)	5:15
4.	"Breaking Up the Girl" (Timo Maas remix)	5:19
5.	"Milk" (Massive Attack remix)	4:31
6.	"Cherry Lips (Go Baby Go!)" (Roger Sanchez remix)	5:01
7.	"Androgyny" (Felix da Housecat remix)	5:29
8.	"Queer" (Rabbit in the Moon remix)	5:04
9.	"I Think I'm Paranoid" (Crystal Method remix)	4:25
10.	"Stupid Girl" (Todd Terry remix)	3:47
11.	"You Look So Fine" (Fun Lovin' Criminals remix)	3:38
12.	"Push It" (Boom Boom Satellites remix)	5:22
13.	"Bad Boyfriend" (Garbage remix)	5:04

DVD edition (Region 0)
No.	Title	Director	Length
1.	"Vow"	Samuel Bayer	4:33
2.	"Queer"	Stéphane Sednaoui	4:53
3.	"Only Happy When It Rains"	Samuel Bayer	3:58
4.	"Stupid Girl"	Samuel Bayer	4:27
5.	"Milk"	Stéphane Sednaoui	3:50
6.	"Push It"	Andrea Giacobbe	4:11
7.	"I Think I'm Paranoid"	Matthew Rolston	3:39
8.	"Special"	Dawn Shadforth	4:06
9.	"When I Grow Up"	Sophie Muller	3:24
10.	"You Look So Fine"	Stéphane Sednaoui	3:51
11.	"The World Is Not Enough"	Philipp Stölzl	4:02
12.	"Cherry Lips"	Joseph Kahn	3:13
13.	"Shut Your Mouth"	Elliot Chaffer	3:30
14.	"Why Do You Love Me"	Sophie Muller	3:53
15.	"Bleed Like Me"	Sophie Muller	4:05
16.	"Tell Me Where It Hurts"	Sophie Muller	4:12
17.	"Thanks for Your Uhh, Support" (produced by Greg Kaplan)		1:09:03

DVD edition (Region 1)
No.	Title	Director	Length
1.	"Vow"	Samuel Bayer	4:33
2.	"Queer"	Stéphane Sednaoui	4:53
3.	"Only Happy When It Rains"	Samuel Bayer	3:58
4.	"Stupid Girl"	Samuel Bayer	4:27
5.	"Milk"	Stéphane Sednaoui	3:50
6.	"Push It"	Andrea Giacobbe	4:11
7.	"I Think I'm Paranoid"	Matthew Rolston	3:39
8.	"Special"	Dawn Shadforth	4:06
9.	"When I Grow Up"	Sophie Muller	3:24
10.	"You Look So Fine"	Stéphane Sednaoui	3:51
11.	"The World Is Not Enough"	Philipp Stölzl	4:02
12.	"Cherry Lips"	Joseph Kahn	3:13
13.	"Shut Your Mouth"	Elliot Chaffer	3:30
14.	"Why Do You Love Me"	Sophie Muller	3:53
15.	"Bleed Like Me"	Sophie Muller	4:05
16.	"Thanks for Your Uhh, Support" (produced by Greg Kaplan)		1:09:03

Notes

- "Queer" contains a loop from "Man of Straw" by Single Gun Theory.
- "Stupid Girl" contains a loop from "Train in Vain" by The Clash.
- "Push It" contains interpolations of "Don't Worry Baby", written by Brian Wilson and Roger Christian, and "Push It", written by Hurby Azor.

== Personnel ==
Credits adapted from the liner notes of the special edition of Absolute Garbage.

=== Musicians ===
- Mike Kashou – bass (disc 1: tracks 1–5)
- Pauli Ryan – percussion (disc 1: tracks 3, 4)
- Les Thimmig – clarinet (disc 1: track 2)
- Daniel Shulman – bass (disc 1: tracks 7–14, 17)
- Brio Taliaferro – additional programming (disc 1: track 18)
- Justin Meldal-Johnsen – bass (disc 1: tracks 15, 16, 18)
- Matt Walker – drums (disc 1: track 15)

=== Technical ===
- Garbage – production (disc 1: tracks 1–18; disc 2: track 13); engineering (disc 1: tracks 1–6); recording (disc 1: tracks 1–5); mixing (disc 1: track 12)
- Nellee Hooper – additional production, mixing (disc 1: track 6)
- Billy Bush – engineering (disc 1: tracks 7–18)
- David Arnold – production (disc 1: track 12)
- Jeremy Wheatley – mixing, additional production (disc 1: track 18)
- Richard Edgeler – mixing assistance (disc 1: track 18)
- Emily Lazar – mastering
- Sarah Register – mastering (disc 1: tracks 1–18)
- Joe LaPorta – mastering assistance (disc 1: tracks 1–18); mastering (disc 2: tracks 1–13)
- John King – production (disc 2: track 13)
- Butch Vig – mixing (disc 2: track 13)

=== Artwork ===
- Tom Hingston Studio – art direction, design
- David Hughes – front cover photography
- Stéphane Sednaoui – booklet photography
- Rankin – booklet photography
- Ellen von Unwerth – booklet photography
- Pat Pope – booklet photography
- Warwick Saint – booklet photography
- Joseph Cultice – booklet photography

== Charts ==
2007 weekly chart performance for Absolute Garbage
Chart (2007)	Peak position
Australian Albums (ARIA)	18
Belgian Albums (Ultratop Flanders)	38
Belgian Albums (Ultratop Wallonia)	28
Canadian Albums (Billboard)	43
European Albums (Billboard)	35
German Albums (Offizielle Top 100)	68
Irish Albums (IRMA)	22
Italian Albums (FIMI)	79
Scottish Albums (Official Charts)	6
Spanish Albums (Promusicae)	59
Swiss Albums (Schweizer Hitparade)	77
UK Albums (Official Charts)	11
US Billboard 200	68
US Top Alternative Albums (Billboard)	24
US Top Rock Albums (Billboard)	25

2012 weekly chart performance for Absolute Garbage
Chart (2012)	Peak position
Croatian International Albums (HDU)	31

Weekly chart performance for the video edition of Absolute Garbage
Chart (2007)	Peak position
US Top Music Videos (Billboard)	5

== Certifications ==
Certifications for Absolute Garbage
Region	Certification	Certified units/sales
United Kingdom (BPI)	Silver	60,000^{‡}
^{‡} Sales+streaming figures based on certification alone.

== Release history ==
Release history and formats for Absolute GarbageAlbum
Region	Date	Format	Edition	Label	Ref.
United Kingdom	July 23, 2007	CD; digital download	Standard; special	A&E; Warner Bros.	
United States	July 24, 2007	CD; digital download	Standard; special	Almo Sounds; Geffen; UM^{e}	
Australia	July 27, 2007	CD; digital download	Special	Warner	
Germany	July 27, 2007	CD; digital download	Standard; special	Warner	
Canada	July 31, 2007	CD; digital download	Standard; special	Universal	
Australia	August 10, 2007	CD; digital download	Standard	Warner	
Japan	September 5, 2007	CD	Standard	Warner	
Various (except North America)	July 30, 2012	Digital download	Standard	Stunvolume	

Video
Region	Date	Format	Label	Ref.
United Kingdom	July 23, 2007	DVD	A&E; Warner Bros.	
United States	July 24, 2007	DVD	Almo Sounds; Geffen; UM^{e}	
Canada	July 31, 2007	DVD	Universal	
Germany	August 24, 2007	DVD	Warner	
