= Breaking Up the Girl =

2001 single by Garbage

Single by Garbage

from the album Beautiful Garbage
- B-side: "Candy Says"; "Happiness Pt.2"; "Confidence"
- Released: November 19, 2001
- Recorded: April 2000–May 2001
- Studio: Smart Studios (Madison, Wisconsin, US)
- Length: 3:33
- Label: Mushroom Records UK; Interscope (North America)
- Songwriter: Garbage
- Producer: Garbage

Garbage singles chronology
"Cherry Lips" (2002)	"Breaking Up the Girl" (2001)	"Shut Your Mouth" (2002)

Music video
- "Breaking Up the Girl" on YouTube

"Breaking Up the Girl" is a 2001 alternative rock song written, recorded and produced by the band Garbage for their third studio album Beautiful Garbage. In North America, it was serviced to alternative radio as the second single from the album.

The song was licensed out as the theme tune to the television film Is It College Yet? (2002), which served as the series finale of the long-running animated series Daria. "Breaking Up the Girl" was subsequently released internationally in April 2002, where it supported the band's UK and European tour. The single reached the top forty in Australia and the United Kingdom.

== Song profile ==
"Breaking Up the Girl" was written and recorded by Garbage between April 2000 and May 2001 at Smart Studios in Madison, Wisconsin during the year-long writing sessions for Beautiful Garbage. At some point in this period of time, Shirley Manson had overheard the rest of the band working on the body of the song, and was inspired to write the melody and lyrics.

During the development of the song, Garbage experimented with Beatles-like harmonies and ad-libs over the coda. and layered a vocal from Manson onto a matching guitar part. "We sampled her going 'aah' and Duke played guitar," Butch Vig explained,"and that made it sound like a weird little melodic quote, not necessarily a vocal part". Although it was one of the album's straightforward rock songs, Garbage couldn't agree on the bass/kickdrum pattern in the chorus, trying various transmutations of a one-bar phrase. Using his Fender Precision Bass and pick, session musician Daniel Shulman created a McCartney-esque bass movement for the verse. Vig felt that the strumming of the guitar chords gave the song a Big Star feel.

A decade earlier, when her Scottish band Angelfish were struggling, Manson had lived in South Queensferry where her friends included Andrew Greig, the poet Iain Banks, Duncan McLean and Alan Warner. At the time she felt washed up, and became reclusive with depression."It was Andrew who came by every morning and knocked on my door. He forced me out of bed and dragged me along the beach. He'd say "If you just keep going along the beach you'll get back on track", Manson later recalled. "He kept me moving. And I did get back on track. Very shortly after that, I got the call to go and join Garbage". Manson credited Greig with saving her career, a debt she tacitly acknowledged by quoting the line "I'm afraid there is much to be afraid of" from his 1994 long poem Western Swing. Lyrically Manson felt that "Breaking Up the Girl" was "a cautionary tale. It's basically saying the world we're living in is harsh and you've got to live in the moment. Focus on the now. If there's something in your life that isn't good then get rid of them." Duke Erikson expanded, "the light, poppy, melodic feel to the song belies the seriousness of the lyrics".

== Single release ==
Interscope Records released "Breaking Up the Girl" as the second North American single from Beautiful Garbage, to the Triple A radio format from the week of November 19, 2001. Garbage were booked on the support slot on U2's Elevation Tour throughout December; the band then spent December promoting the Beautiful Garbage album in the United States, recording a VH1 Behind The Music special (for broadcast after the new year) and performing "Breaking Up the Girl" on The Tonight Show on December 12. Ahead of the Daria premiere, "Breaking Up the Girl" began to pick up station adds. Interscope re-serviced the song to adult radio where it peaked at #12 on the Triple A chart.

The UK release of "Breaking Up the Girl" was scheduled to follow the band's concert tour in April 2002. The band performed the song on cd:uk prior to the commencement of the live dates, which ran for eight consecutive nights. On April 8, Mushroom Records issued the single as a 3×CD single set backed with three b-sides: "Confidence", an out-take from Beautiful Garbage and featured drums performed by Matt Chamberlain; "Happiness Pt.2", a discarded demo reworked by Butch Vig while he was recovering from a Hepatitis infection the previous year; and a cover version of Velvet Underground's "Candy Says", featuring a bass guitar part by the band's engineer Billy Bush and recorded during tour rehearsals. The three tracks were spread out over the three discs, as were an acoustic version and a QuickTime music video of the title track, and two remixes of "Breaking Up the Girl" produced by Brothers In Rhythm and Timo Maas; and a version of "Cherry Lips (Go Baby Go!)" by Eli Janney. The single peaked at #27 on the UK Singles Chart. The following week, Pepsi Chart Show broadcast a live recording of Garbage performing "Breaking Up the Girl" on-stage at the Brixton Academy during the tour, while Top of the Pops broadcast a performance of the single pre-recorded by the band the previous November.

In Europe, PIAS Recordings issued "Breaking Up the Girl" across the continent as a five track enhanced CD maxi collecting together both remixes, "Use Me" (an album out-take released earlier in the United Kingdom and Australia on the b-side of "Cherry Lips") and an enhanced music video section; as a two-track CD single backed with a radio edit of the Timo Maas remix; and an exclusive 12" vinyl format of multiple remixes. Garbage returned to tour European rock festivals in June 2002 (follow-up single "Shut Your Mouth" was released to support these dates). Prior to these shows, Garbage performed a special concert for Los 40 Principales and completed a mini-tour of Spain sponsored by telecom company Movistar in Salamanca, Madrid, Bilbao and Barcelona. During this time, "Breaking Up the Girl" reached #33 on the Spanish airplay chart.

Following up Garbage's first Australian top ten hit ("Cherry Lips"), FMR scheduled the release of "Breaking Up the Girl" to begin low-key, with the remixes impacting clubs from March 1, 2002, eight weeks in advance of the single's street date. The song was serviced to Australian radio stations and the music video to television networks on March 25. FMR issued "Breaking Up the Girl" to stores on April 29. The single was issued as 2×CD single set, backed with "Candy Says", "Confidence" and Eli Janney's remix of "Cherry Lips" on the first disc, and the acoustic version, Brothers in Rhythm and Timo Maas mixes on a limited edition second disc. At the start of May, "Breaking Up the Girl" debuted on the ARIA Charts at #19, the band's second single to reach the top twenty in Australia. The single also debuted at #2 on the ARIA Alternative chart. FMR launched a television ad campaign during May, with heavy emphasis on "Breaking Up the Girl"; Beautiful Garbage recharted and reclimbed the album charts chart to #27. At the end of June, "Breaking Up the Girl" eventually bowed out of the Top 100 at #96 after an eight-week run. In New Zealand, Beautiful Garbage rebounded on the RIANZ album chart during April, reaching #16."Breaking Up the Girl" did not make the RIANZ singles chart.

Garbage began a two-month North American tour in mid-April, which was routed into the SoCal area and into Mexico by June; at that time "Breaking Up the Girl" went into heavy rotation on MTV en Español. Garbage's tour ended at the start of June with a concert at Mexico City's National Auditorium; "Breaking Up the Girl" was subsequently released in Mexico through Universal as a five-track CD maxi.

== Music video ==
Garbage perform in the main "Breaking Up the Girl" clip.

The promotional video for "Breaking Up the Girl" was directed by Francis Lawrence and shot over December 5/6, 2001 in Los Angeles.

Two version of the video were made. The first version released contained footage lifted from the Daria series mixed with montage footage of Garbage performing and shots of the band filming the video. The video was premiered on January 21, 2002, on MTV during the intermission to the first showing of the Daria movie Is It College Yet?. MTV Europe playlisted the video at the end of March.

The second released version, which became the main edit of the video, which was broadcast worldwide from February 2002. The video began with a CGI shot of a shattered rose, which disintegrated as the band appear. While Manson features heavily during the verses, the band perform together during the choruses. For the latter part of the video, all of the montage shots of Garbage disintegrate like the rose at the beginning, and the video ends with the rose reforming. The pace of the video is kept up using aggressive editing and cutting between shots filmed with zoom and fisheye lenses.

The international edit of the "Breaking Up the Girl" music video was first made commercially available in QuickTime format on the CD-ROM enhanced section of the "Breaking Up the Girl" singles. The video, like the song, did not appear on 2007's Absolute Garbage.

== Alternate versions and remixes ==
The CD format of Beautiful Garbage contained an enhanced element where users could remix four tracks from the album, of which "Breaking Up the Girl" was one. Created in conjunction with Sonic Foundry, using a customized version of their drag-and-drop ACID Pro music sequencer software, the remixes utilized samples and loops cut direct from the album masters. The enhanced section could be accessed when the user was online; a simplified version of the software featuring only "Androgyny" loops was accessible when the user was offline.

In 2007, the Timo Maas remix of "Breaking Up the Girl" was remastered, edited and included on the Absolute Garbage greatest hits album bonus disc Garbage Mixes. Four rejected mixes by Jimmy Caulty and Black Dog Productions surfaced in May 2011.

== Critical reception ==
"Breaking Up the Girl" received a mixed response from contemporary music journalists. Paul Elliot of Q, who had the chance to listen to the track as soon as it was mixed, described the song as being "redolent of vintage Blondie". Jerry Ewing of Classic Rock wrote that the song was "wonderful, guitar-based rock, with a magic sprinkling of melody" "This serene delight showcases Garbage's softer side," wrote Sunday Mail's Billy Sloan, "Its soft sound contrasts against the spurned vocals; a testament to the chameleon-like style that is the glory of Garbage"

A review included in Smash Hits! claimed: "[It's] not as instantly memorable as ["Cherry Lips"]... this radio-friendly rock-tinged pop will have your toes tapping away to the beat in no time". Chuck Taylor of Billboard compared the song to Republica's "Ready to Go" writing "this track conjures up images... of Manson frolicking in a daisy patch. It's all back to Earth with the lyric, which pretty much calls the subject to a loser for hurting a girl. You've been warned, now just enjoy the pace." Jason Arnopp of Kerrang! described "Breaking Up the Girl" as "[It] glides along sultry, sad and dreamy, driven by a practically recognisable acoustic guitar."

== Track listings ==
- UK CD1 Mushroom MUSH101CDS
1. "Breaking Up the Girl" – 3:33
2. "Candy Says" – 4:03
3. "Breaking Up the Girl" (Brothers in Rhythm Therapy mix) – 10:44
4. "Breaking Up the Girl" (video)
- UK CD2 Mushroom MUSH101CDSX
1. "Breaking Up the Girl" – 3:33
2. "Happiness Pt. 2" – 5:57
3. "Breaking Up the Girl" (Timo Maas remix) – 6:42
- UK CD3 Mushroom MUSH101CDSXXX
1. "Breaking Up the Girl" (acoustic version) – 3:20
2. "Confidence" – 3:09
3. "Cherry Lips (Go Baby Go!)" (DJEJ's Go-Go Jam) – 6:13
- Europe CD single PIAS Recordings MUSH101CDSE
1. "Breaking Up the Girl" – 3:33
2. "Breaking Up the Girl" (Timo Maas radio edit) – 3:33
- Europe CD maxi PIAS Recordings MUSH101CDM
1. "Breaking Up the Girl" – 3:33
2. "Use Me" – 4:34
3. "Breaking Up the Girl" (Timo Maas remix) – 6:42
4. "Breaking Up the Girl" (Brothers in Rhythm radio edit) – 3:52
5. "Breaking Up the Girl" (video)
- Europe 12" single PIAS Recordings MUSH101T
1. "Breaking Up the Girl" (Timo Maas remix) – 6:42
2. "Breaking Up the Girl" (Brothers in Rhythm Therapy dub) – 8:03
3. "Breaking Up the Girl" (Brothers in Rhythm Therapy mix) – 10:44
4. "Breaking Up the Girl" (Timo Maas dub) – 6:42
- Australia CD1 FMR MUSH101CDS
1. "Breaking Up the Girl" – 3:33
2. "Candy Says" – 4:03
3. "Confidence" – 3:09
4. "Cherry Lips (Go Baby Go!)" (DJEJ's Go-Go Jam) – 6:13
5. "Breaking Up the Girl" (video)
- Australia CD2 FMR MUSH101CDSX
1. "Breaking Up the Girl" (acoustic version) – 3:20
2. "Breaking Up the Girl" (Timo Maas remix) – 6:42
3. "Breaking Up the Girl" (Brothers in Rhythm Therapy dub) – 8:03
4. "Breaking Up the Girl" (Brothers in Rhythm Therapy mix) – 10:44
5. "Breaking Up the Girl" (Timo Maas dub) – 6:42

== Charts ==
Chart performance for "Breaking Up the Girl"
Chart (2002)	Peak position
Australia (ARIA)	19
Scotland (Official Charts Company)	26
UK Singles (Official Charts Company)	27
UK Indie (OCC)	4
US Triple A Songs (Billboard)	12

== Release history ==
Release history and formats for "Breaking Up the Girl"
Territory	Release date	Record label	Format(s)
United States	November 19, 2001	Interscope	Modern rock, Active rock & AAA
United States	February 2002	Interscope	Mainstream Top 40 & Adult Top 40
Australia	March 25, 2002	F MR	Airplay
Europe	April 8, 2002	PIAS Recordings	12" vinyl, CD maxi, CD single
United Kingdom	April 8, 2002	Mushroom Records UK	3×CD single set
Australia	April 29, 2002	FMR	2×CD single set
Mexico	June 2002	Universal	CD maxi
