= Beautiful Garbage =

Studio album by Garbage
- Released: October 1, 2001
- Recorded: April 2000 – May 2001
- Studio: Smart (Madison, Wisconsin)
- Genre: Alternative rock; electronica; trip hop
- Length: 53:01
- Label: Mushroom
- Producer: Garbage

Garbage chronology
Version 2.0 (1998)	Beautiful Garbage (2001)	Special Collection (2002)

Singles from Beautiful Garbage
- 1. "Androgyny" Released: September 24, 2001; 2. "Cherry Lips" Released: January 21, 2002; 3. "Breaking Up the Girl" Released: April 8, 2002; 4. "Shut Your Mouth" Released: September 23, 2002

Beautiful Garbage (stylized as beautifulgarbage) is the third studio album by American rock band Garbage. It was released on October 1, 2001, by Mushroom Records worldwide, with the North American release by Interscope Records the following day. Marking a departure from the sound the band had established on their first two releases, the album was written and recorded over the course of a year, when lead singer Shirley Manson chronicled their efforts weekly online, becoming one of the first high-profile musicians to keep an Internet blog. The album expanded on the band's musical variety, with stronger melodies, more direct lyrics, and sounds mixing rock with electronica, new wave, hip hop, and girl groups.

The album suffered from lack of promotion and the failure of its lead single "Androgyny" to achieve high chart positions. Beautiful Garbage debuted at number 13 on the Billboard 200, while topping the albums chart in Australia and peaking within the top 10 in multiple European countries, and was named one of Rolling Stone's "Top 10 Albums of the Year".

A remastered and expanded edition of the album was released on November 5, 2021, to mark its 20th anniversary. The triple CD set featured two bonus CDs, consisting of b-sides, alternate versions, previously unreleased recordings and remixes.

== Background ==
The origins of Beautiful Garbage came from a three-day recording session in September 1999 during Garbage's world tour in support of their second album, Version 2.0. The sessions resulted in "Silence Is Golden" and "Til the Day I Die", which were written for a proposed B-sides album. Both songs were loose and organic, contrasting with the very densely layered production featured on Version 2.0. "Silence Is Golden" in particular was written with an odd metric structure for a Garbage song: a 6/8 shuffle that progresses to a straight 4/4 beat.

The sale of the band's North American independent record label Almo Sounds to Universal Music Group in early 2000 put the B-sides album on hold; Garbage decided to simply start work on recording their third album instead. Garbage began writing and recording the album at their own Smart Studios in Madison, Wisconsin in April of that year. "The only vision we had was that we wanted it to sound different," recalled guitarist Duke Erikson about the influence that the two new tracks had cast, adding that the band wished to evolve the chemistry that the band had developed from touring the previous two years.

== Composition ==
More diverse than their first two studio albums, musically more melodic and lyrically more direct, Beautiful Garbage featured electronica fused with contemporary hip hop, with influences coming from 1980s new wave to 1960s girl groups. Garbage acknowledged the broad span of sounds and styles, which included Prince, The Rolling Stones, Blondie, and Phil Spector. Regarding the melancholic lyrics, Manson stated they happened because after two years touring "we were very isolated and removed from our lives", so when writing the lyrics, "I felt an overwhelming sense that I need to reinvest in my 'relations'".

It was a really interesting experience for me as a musician. I learned a lot. It was quite a liberating experience in a funny way. I was going through a divorce, and I ripped my hair out, basically shaved it. I felt like I had rid myself of all shackles ... On the other side of it, you're stuffed in a cage and tied down to all your old ideas, all your old opinions, all your old creative output, and that can be a prison sometimes. So for me, Beautifulgarbage was really liberating. I have a real soft spot for [the record] – I think we all do in the band, actually.

— Shirley Manson

Drummer Butch Vig stated that the album is a "much simpler record than Version 2.0": "All of the songs sort of came from us playing live downstairs [in Smart Studios] with guitar, bass and drums ... That was the only conscious decision we made – to make the songs simpler. Some of the songs are still layered in spots; compared to the last record, there're about half as many tracks. As far as sounds go, it's basically drums, bass, some heavy guitars and Shirley singing." Erikson agreed that a more organic sound and simplistic approach with respect to production is embodied by the final mix of the album. "A lot of songs took shape in just a few hours as opposed to a few months with the last record....Some of the songs obviously took a long time, or we wouldn't have been in the studio for a full year. But a lot of them happened very quickly. 'Silence Is Golden' we recorded basically in three days and it was done. 'So Like a Rose,' for the most part, was recorded in three hours. I think we spent a lot of time just trying to resist adding stuff to [the new album]. Because that was our tendency on the other two records." On the lyrical content of the songs, Vig remarked that "[Manson's lyrics] aren't specifically responses to the industry, but they could be read that way. Shirley has said that, for example, 'Shut Your Mouth' is about all the bullshit that's out there, but it's also a sort of note to self to keep your mouth shut, because she says she's the biggest, most opinionated loudmouth of anyone around. So they work on multiple levels."

Garbage decided the best way to start writing the album was to set up their recording equipment, guitars, keyboards, drum kit and a sampler and "jam" as a group. Their improvisation led the inspiration of a few songs such as "Shut Your Mouth", where the band played for three hours while Manson spontaneously composed melody and lyrics, while "Breaking Up the Girl" came from both Erikson and Vig strumming acoustic guitars in the studio lounge. The band felt that it was foremost that the new songs worked on an emotional level with Manson's vocals and lyrics. The initial sessions ultimately led to around 32 song ideas to develop further.

== Recording ==
Shirley Manson interview from 2001, around the release of Beautiful Garbage

Smart Studios had upgraded their mixing console to a Trident A-Range model, which the band used extensively. The band tracked directly onto analogue tape using a Studer tape machine, which was then dumped into Pro Tools digital audio workstation. Overdubs and mixing were carried out in Pro Tools.

I think if someone really wanted to figure out the processes we go through, they should listen to all the mixes of one song, all the way through. As soon as we have the basic idea, we jam in the studio, and Shirley comes up with the melody and the lyrics. It might be in a very raw form to start with, but as we go, we constantly make rough mixes. You could probably go from the first one through about 12 or 20 mixes and hear what the change will be. Some of the songs take radical detours to get from point A to point B, when the song's finished.

— Butch Vig

Vig kept the drums and percussion simpler than before. Percussive tracks were recorded through a 30-year-old Roger Meyer compressor to color the sound (Vig: "It's really saturated and distorted, but in a very musical way"). Some tracks however were fairly scrutinized: an instrumental break in "Til the Day I Die" incorporated reverse tape effects. Vig was not satisfied with his "swing" on a 6/8 groove written for a falsetto vocal Manson had recorded on "Can't Cry These Tears", so he recruited Matt Chamberlain to play the part. The recorded sequence incorporated Chamberlain's contribution, some of Vig's performance and some light programming. Chamberlain also performed a "chopped-up" drum pattern for "Cup of Coffee" and a "bitchin' funk groove" on "Confidence".

Much of the recorded guitar work was heavily processed, the band using a Line 6 Pod for melodic parts and embellishments: for example, for the middle eight of "So Like a Rose", Erikson played a Les Paul with an E-bow through the Pod, while the synth-like intro to "Parade" was created by layering an acoustic guitar part with a clean electric guitar. A tremolo effect on "Can't Cry These Tears" was inspired by 1960s production techniques. The amp modelers were used to pre-effect the recording prior to Pro Tools, in order to prevent phasing. For electric guitar recording, the band utilized cabinet miking – four microphones recorded the output of a Marshall amplifier. Acoustics were recorded using a single Blue Bottle microphone. Daniel Shulman, who had performed bass guitar on Version 2.0 and the band's two world tours, spent two separate weeks laying down bass parts. Shulman was given freedom by the band to come up with parts and be creative, creating new basslines on the verses of "Androgyny" and "Nobody Loves You". Shulman revisited "Silence Is Golden", breaking up the straight eighths of the coda to make it more interesting.

Due to Manson's growing confidence and technical skill, the band decided that her vocals did not require much treatment; "Shirley was singing so much better, and she was coming up with melodies that were longer and had more range to them...there wasn't any point in doing a lot with it. On something like 'Nobody Loves You' she sings really low on the verse, almost at the bottom of her range, and then and the end she's singing three and a half octaves higher, almost in falsetto, as the song turns into a big wall of sound", Vig remarked. Manson's original guide vocals were used in the final mixes of several songs; the vocal on "So Like a Rose" was recorded on the first take. On some songs, however, Manson's vocal was subject to Pro Tools plug-ins and post effects. "Til the Day Die" featured a digital "scratch"-effect, created by printing her vocal to DAT and using whatever edited passes sounded good. On "Can't Cry These Tears", the four vocal parts were triple-tracked using different mikes, while a guitar riff was matched to her voice for a section of "Breaking Up the Girl". On "Cherry Lips", her entire vocal was sped up and heavily EQ'd. On slower songs such as "Drive You Home", Garbage were not overly concerned with phrasing and pitch, giving it "a rawer quality". Manson improved on her guitar skills and played more guitar in the studio and live on stage for the eventual tour.

Garbage finished recording Beautiful Garbage at the end of April 2001, and spent a month completing the final mix (some songs had gone through as many as 40 rough mixes). Final EQ, compressing and sequencing on the album was handled by Scott Hull of Classic Sound in New York. Despite running a competition on their website to name the album, Manson's own working title, inspired by a lyric in Hole's "Celebrity Skin", won out. Shirley explained: "We took the title from "Celebrity Skin" because when I heard Courtney singing "beautiful garbage", it's like a great dichotomy and we nicked it. Yes, she knows, and we have her blessing". The album artwork came from Garbage's wish for it to be "something organic"; The band came up with the fractured rose idea, thinking that it worked well with the album title. Garbage contracted London-based designers Me Company to create the visuals. The artwork for Beautiful Garbage cost $75,000.

== Release ==
The international special edition "rose"-pack Beautiful Garbage CD format

Preceding the worldwide release, on September 27, 2001, Beautiful Garbage was released early in Japan through Sony Music, featuring two exclusive bonus tracks: "Begging Bone", the B-side of "Androgyny", and "The World Is Not Enough", their James Bond theme from the film of the same name. In Australia and New Zealand, the album was released by their label FMR.

On October 1, 2001, Beautiful Garbage was released worldwide, with the North American release the following day. Mushroom Records issued the album on five formats within the United Kingdom: a standard edition CD, a limited edition specially packaged CD (in a fold-out rose shaped holder and plastic slipcase), double LP, cassette and MiniDisc. Mushroom licensed the album to PIAS Recordings for release in Western Europe and through their distributor Playground Music in Scandinavia; PIAS pressed their own standard CD, "rose-pack" CD and double LP formats for the continent. In the United States, Almo Sounds and Interscope Records released Beautiful Garbage on CD, double LP and cassette. Interscope's parent company Universal Music Group released the album in Canada.

=== Beautiful Garbage mixer ===
The CD formats of Beautiful Garbage contained an enhanced element which users could access and remix four tracks from the album: "Shut Your Mouth", "Androgyny", "Breaking Up the Girl" and "Cherry Lips". Created in conjunction with Sonic Foundry, using a customized version of their drag-and-drop ACID Pro music sequencer software, the remixes utilized samples and loops taken directly from the album masters. programmed and designed by design company DDW. The enhanced section could be accessed when the user was online; a simplified version of the software featuring only "Androgyny" loops was accessible when the user was offline.

Interscope Records and Sonic Foundry launched a competition in November 2001, in which fans were invited to remix "Androgyny" by downloading free ACID Xpress software. Entrants could then upload their work to a specially created website (www.acidgarbage.com) to stream their mixes online. The winner received copies of Sonic Foundry's audio software – ACID Pro, Sound Forge, and Vegas Audio – and five loop libraries.

== Tour ==
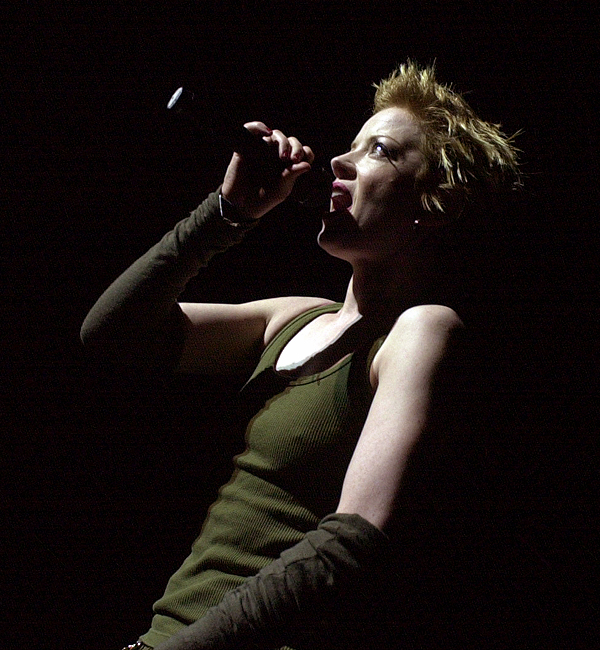
Manson performing during the Beautiful Garbage World Tour

Garbage marked the release of Beautiful Garbage by performing an in-store set in Chicago's Virgin Megastore on October 2, 2001. Garbage began touring the album as the opening act on the third leg of U2's Elevation Tour from October 12 in Notre Dame, Indiana, into Canada and through to October 24 in New York City. Before last show, Vig collapsed from the effects of food poisoning and contracting hepatitis A. Rather than cancelling the scheduled shows, Garbage recruited Matt Chamberlain to replace Vig for the remainder of the year. Garbage performed a series of underplayed headlining shows in Europe during November, beginning in Trondheim, Norway and ending in London, England, on November 14. Garbage then returned to North America for the final Elevation Tour Southern State shows, from Kansas City, Missouri, on November 27 through to the last show in Miami on December 2. At the last show, U2 drummer Larry Mullen Jr. played drums on "Only Happy When It Rains". Garbage wrapped up 2001 by performing at the Not So Silent Night radio festival in Los Angeles.

The Beautiful Garbage tour started in earnest in January 2002 in New Zealand and Australia, when Garbage joined the Big Day Out festival. In between the festival shows, Garbage headlined two concerts in Melbourne and Sydney. Garbage then spent 10 days in Japan, performing four headline shows in Osaka and Tokyo.

Garbage launched a headline UK tour on April 1, 2002, in Portsmouth, a run that included an acoustic performance in Edinburgh and headlining MTV's 5 Night Stand. The band were supported on the UK dates by Kelli Ali. Beyond the UK, the run extended to a number of shows in Cologne, Amsterdam and Bourges. On April 19, Garbage returned to play a six-week itinerary of North American dates. Beginning in Toronto, the tour was routed down the Eastern Coast of America, over to the Midwest and then onto the West Coast. The jaunt ended with two night stint in Los Angeles. Garbage were supported by Abandoned Pools and on some shows, by White Stripes; during the tour, Vig was taken ill (later diagnosed as Bell's Palsy) and was replaced again by Matt Chamberlain. Garbage wrapped the North American tour dates on June 6 in Mexico City.

A month-long European trek began June 10 in Madrid, covering major festivals including Glastonbury and Roskilde. Matt Walker stood in for Vig for the rest of the summer. Garbage performed two shows in Nice and Lyon supporting Red Hot Chili Peppers, and a further two headlining French shows in Lille and Paris with Mercury Rev as support. The European leg ended at Espárrago Rock in Spain on July 12. Throughout the run, Manson was dogged by vocal problems, leading to the cancellation of a few festival appearances. After a six-week break, Garbage returned to the United Kingdom to perform their last European shows of the year – two intimate club gigs in London.

With Vig rejoining the ranks following his recovery period, Garbage headed to Australia to perform at the four date M-One festival across the country at the beginning of October. They then joined No Doubt, who were promoting their Rock Steady album, to co-headline a trek around the United States; support came from The Distillers. Kicking off on October 15 in West Kingston, Rhode Island, the tour was routed down the Eastern Seaboard, and into Southern States before heading to the Pacific Northwest region and onto the American Southwest. The tour ended on November 27 in Long Beach, California. Garbage went on to perform one further show, in Hell, Grand Cayman.

== Critical reception ==
Professional ratings
Aggregate scores
Source	Rating
Metacritic	69/100
Review scores
Source	Rating
AllMusic	3/5 stars
Robert Christgau	(1-star Honorable Mention)
Entertainment Weekly	B
Kerrang!	5/5 stars
NME	5/10
Q	4/5 stars
The Rolling Stone Album Guide	4/5 stars
Sunday Tribune	5/5 stars
Uncut	5/5 stars

Beautiful Garbage received generally positive reviews from music critics. At Metacritic, which assigns a normalized rating out of 100 to reviews from mainstream publications, the album received an average score of 69, based on 17 reviews. Both Rolling Stone's US and Australian editions named Beautiful Garbage as one of their critics "Top 10 Albums of the Year".

Tom Laskin of Isthmus wrote that the significant "sonic tweaking and abundant sampling" of Version 2.0 is discarded as the songs are supported primarily by "bass, drum, and guitar configurations". Observing a musical theme, it is "the band's abandonment of digitally manipulated perfection in favor of rawer guitars and more immediate vocal performances." He added that, overall, the album is "far less commercially accommodating than any of the band's previous work. It embraces no particular sound or style. It comes across with ideas and commentary that challenge rather than coerce, and the playing lacks the burnished, artificial quality that's characteristic of so much youth-oriented music these days." Peter Robinson of NME wrote that the album was a "departure from the sound Garbage had established on their first two records"; It is "marked by expanding on the musical variety, with stronger melodies, more direct lyrics, and sounds that mix rock with hip hop, electronica, new wave, and girl groups." Sound on Sound described the band's approach to recording guitars as "distinctive", observing the "distorted crunches cheek-by-jowl with delicate acoustics and treated sounds which are almost unrecognizable." Michael Paoletta of Billboard noted that audiences expecting "more of the same [Version 2.0] are in for a wonderful surprise." The band eschews "disco-infused electronica foundations for more straight-up rock'n'pop". "Modern tales for modern times, sung by the vocally versatile Manson, make for one of the year's best." Q described it as "sharp, seductive music from a band at their peak." Uncut called it "their most accomplished and convincing album yet."

AllMusic's Stephen Thomas Erlewine commented that Garbage's penchant for absorbing elements from various genres, skillfully crafting them together is more evident in this album, in how they "approximate contemporary R&B with the sultry 'Androgyny', or the Minneapolis new wave bubblegum funk of 'Cherry Lips (Go Baby Go!),' or the bluesy PJ Harvey strut of 'Silence Is Golden.'" This penchant is enhanced by an "unabashedly pop coating, an element that Garbage clearly revel in, as well as should the listener." He described it "every bit as enticingly postmodern as their other albums, and it sounds distinctly Garbage" and although the fusion elements are perceptible, "they seem less like magpies, more themselves, which means Beautiful Garbage is a more consistent record." David Browne of Entertainment Weekly observed Manson's continued "aggressive bite" complemented by "throbbing tracks like 'Till the Day I Die' and 'Shut Your Mouth'", as well as exposing "tender aspects" in "heartfelt" and "subdued" songs like 'Cup of Coffee' and 'So Like a Rose'. He noted however that the band's "experiments with sonic expansion yield more mixed results"; "They thaw their sound by adding elements of trip-hop, which works for 'Cup of Coffee' and the first single, 'Androgyny'...But on a record that's more self-consciously varied than 1998's Version 2.0 other attempts are gimmicky and less successful. "Still, there's just enough to salvage from beautifulgarbage."

== Commercial performance ==
Beautiful Garbage debuted at number 13 on the US Billboard 200 with first-week sales of 73,000 copies. It also debuted atop Billboard's Top Electronic Albums chart, spending seven consecutive weeks at the top position. As of August 2008, the album had sold 405,000 copies in the United States. The album peaked at number six on the Canadian Albums Chart, and on October 12, 2001, it was certified gold by the Canadian Recording Industry Association (CRIA).

In the United Kingdom, Beautiful Garbage sold 25,173 units to debut at number six on the UK Albums Chart. The British Phonographic Industry (BPI) certified the album gold on October 19, 2001, and by July 2007, it had sold 121,397 copies in the UK. It was commercially successful across the rest of Europe, reaching the top five in Finland, France, and Ireland, and the top 10 in Austria, Belgium, Germany, Italy, Norway, Spain, and Switzerland.

The album debuted at number one on the Australian ARIA Albums Chart and received a platinum certification from the Australian Recording Industry Association (ARIA). In New Zealand, it debuted at number two on the RIANZ Albums Chart and was certified gold by the Recording Industry Association of New Zealand (RIANZ). By December 2001, Beautiful Garbage had sold nearly 1.2 million copies worldwide.

== Track listing ==
All tracks are written by Garbage, except where noted.

Beautiful Garbage track listing
No.	Title	Length
1.	"Shut Your Mouth"	3:25
2.	"Androgyny"	3:09
3.	"Can't Cry These Tears"	4:16
4.	"Til the Day I Die"	3:28
5.	"Cup of Coffee"	4:31
6.	"Silence Is Golden"	3:49
7.	"Cherry Lips (Go Baby Go!)"	3:12
8.	"Breaking Up the Girl"	3:33
9.	"Drive You Home"	3:58
10.	"Parade"	4:07
11.	"Nobody Loves You"	5:08
12.	"Untouchable"	4:03
13.	"So Like a Rose"	6:17
Total length:		53:01

International enhanced CD bonus material
No.	Title	Length
14.	"Beautiful Garbage mixer"

Japanese edition bonus tracks
No.	Title	Length
14.	"Begging Bone"	4:50
15.	"The World Is Not Enough" (David Arnold, Don Black)	3:56

=== 20th anniversary editions ===
Deluxe bonus vinyl
No.	Title	Length
1.	"Candy Says" (Lou Reed)	4:02
2.	"Use Me"	4:33
3.	"Sex Never Goes Out of Fashion"	3:53
4.	"Begging Bone"	4:46
5.	"April 10th"	4:24
6.	"Happiness Pt. 2"	5:56
7.	"Confidence"	3:08
8.	"Enough Is Never Enough"	4:07
9.	"Wild Horses" (Live) (Jagger–Richards)	4:52
10.	"I'm Really Into Techno"	1:19

Deluxe CD2: B-Sides and Alt Versions
No.	Title	Length
1.	"Candy Says" (Reed)	4:02
2.	"Use Me"	4:33
3.	"Sex Never Goes Out of Fashion"	3:53
4.	"Begging Bone"	4:46
5.	"April 10th"	4:24
6.	"Happiness Pt. 2"	5:56
7.	"Confidence"	3:08
8.	"Enough Is Never Enough"	4:07
9.	"Wild Horses" (Live) (Jagger–Richards)	4:52
10.	"I'm Really Into Techno"	1:19
11.	"Pride (In the Name of Love)" (Live) (U2)	3:55
12.	"Androgyny" (Rough Mix March 14, 2001)	3:09
13.	"Til the Day I Die" (Demo September 14, 1999)	3:25
14.	"Nobody Loves You" (Rough Mix March 14, 2001)	5:19
15.	"Breaking Up the Girl" (Acoustic)	3:19
16.	"Silence Is Golden" (Demo September 14, 1999)	4:05
17.	"Can't Cry These Tears" (Rough Mix March 14, 2001)	4:13
18.	"Shut Your Mouth" (Live)	3:30
19.	"Begging Bone" (Early Demo Mix)	5:05

Deluxe CD3: Remixes
No.	Title	Length
1.	"Shut Your Mouth" (Jagz Kooner Radio Mix)	4:29
2.	"Shut Your Mouth" (Jolly Music Scary Full Vocal Mix)	5:19
3.	"Shut Your Mouth" (Professor Reay Clubbed Dead Pig Mix)	6:51
4.	"Androgyny" (The Neptunes Remix)	3:18
5.	"Androgyny" (Felix da Housecat Thee Glitz Mix)	6:07
6.	"Androgyny" (The Architechs Mix)	4:56
7.	"Breaking Up the Girl" (Timo Maas Radio Mix)	3:44
8.	"Breaking Up the Girl" (Brothers in Rhythm Radio Edit)	3:52
9.	"Breaking Up the Girl" (The Scourge of the Earth Rodeo Rave Remix by Jimmy Cauty)	4:38
10.	"Breaking Up the Girl" (Black Dog Wounded by the Warbeast)	4:48
11.	"Cherry Lips (Go Baby Go!)" (Le Royale Mix)	3:17
12.	"Cherry Lips (Go Baby Go!)" (MaUVe's Dark Remix with Acapella Edit)	3:01
13.	"Cherry Lips (Go Baby Go!)" (DJEJ's Go Go Jam by Eli Janney)	6:09
14.	"Cherry Lips (Go Baby Go!)" (Roger Sanchez's Tha S-Man's Release Mix Radio Edit)	3:38
15.	"Cherry Lips (Go Baby Go!)" (Howie B Remix)	8:39
16.	"Parade" (End of Night Mix)	4:12

Digital deluxe disc 4
No.	Title	Length
1.	"Shut Your Mouth" (Jagz Kooner Full Vocal Mix)	4:39
2.	"Shut Your Mouth" (Jadell Remix)	3:40
3.	"Shut Your Mouth" (Professor Reay Clubbed Dead Pig Dub Mix)	6:21
4.	"Shut Your Mouth" (Cuban Boys Rascasse Edit Mix)	3:19
5.	"Shut Your Mouth" (Cuban Boys Rocksteady Electro Mix)	3:01
6.	"Shut Your Mouth" (Broadway Project Remix)	3:15
7.	"Androgyny" (Felix Da Housecat Thee Drum Drum Mix/2021 Remaster)	4:35
8.	"Androgyny" (The Architects Dub/2021 Remaster)	5:02
9.	"Cherry Lips (Go Baby Go!)" (MaUVe's Dark Remix with Acapella/2021 Remaster)	7:47
10.	"Cherry Lips (Go Baby Go!)" (Roger Sanchez's Tha S-Man's Release (Bomb) Mix/2021 Remaster)	6:49
11.	"Cherry Lips (Go Baby Go!)" (Roger Sanchez's Tha S-Man's Release Dub/2021 Remaster)	6:49
12.	"Breaking Up the Girl" (Timo Maas Club Full Vox/2021 Remaster)	6:43
13.	"Breaking Up the Girl" (Brothers in Rhythm Therapy Mix/2021 Remaster)	10:44
14.	"Breaking Up the Girl" (Brothers in Rhythm Therapy Dub/2021 Remaster)	8:03
15.	"Breaking Up the Girl" (Black Dog Splitsville Mix/2021 Remaster)	6:08
16.	"Breaking Up the Girl" (Black Dog Ripped Out Fireplace Mix/2021 Remaster)	5:08

== Personnel ==
Credits adapted from the liner notes of Beautiful Garbage.

Garbage

- Duke Erikson
- Shirley Manson
- Steve Marker
- Butch Vig

Additional musicians

- Daniel Shulman – bass
- Matt Chamberlain – drums on "Can't Cry These Tears" and "Cup of Coffee"

Technical

- Garbage – production
- Billy Bush – engineering
- Scott Hull – mastering

Artwork

- Garbage – art direction
- Me Company – design
- Warwick Saint – photography

== Charts ==
=== Weekly charts ===
Weekly chart performance for Beautiful Garbage
Chart (2001)	Peak position
Australian Albums (ARIA)	1
Austrian Albums (Ö3 Austria)	9
Belgian Albums (Ultratop Flanders)	9
Belgian Albums (Ultratop Wallonia)	2
Canadian Albums (Billboard)	6
Danish Albums (Hitlisten)	12
Dutch Albums (Album Top 100)	24
European Albums (Music & Media)	2
Finnish Albums (Suomen virallinen lista)	4
French Albums (SNEP)	3
German Albums (Offizielle Top 100)	6
Greek Albums (IFPI)	2
Irish Albums (IRMA)	4
Italian Albums (FIMI)	9
Japanese Albums (Oricon)	16
New Zealand Albums (RMNZ)	2
Norwegian Albums (VG-lista)	7
Polish Albums (ZPAV)	21
Portuguese Albums (AFP)	8
Scottish Albums (OCC)	5
Spanish Albums (AFYVE)	7
Swedish Albums (Sverigetopplistan)	29
Swiss Albums (Schweizer Hitparade)	10
UK Albums (OCC)	6
UK Independent Albums (OCC)	1
US Billboard 200	13
US Top Dance Albums (Billboard)	1

=== Year-end charts ===
2001 year-end chart performance for Beautiful Garbage
Chart (2001)	Position
Australian Albums (ARIA)	57
Belgian Albums (Ultratop Wallonia)	94
French Albums (SNEP)	138
US Top Dance/Electronic Albums (Billboard)	2

2002 year-end chart performance for Beautiful Garbage
Chart (2002)	Position
Australian Albums (ARIA)	29
US Top Dance/Electronic Albums (Billboard)	8

== Certifications and sales ==
Certifications and sales for Beautiful Garbage
Region	Certification	Certified units/sales
Australia (ARIA)	2× Platinum	140,000^{‡}
Belgium (BRMA)	Gold	25,000^{*}
Canada (Music Canada)	Gold	50,000^{^}
New Zealand (RMNZ)	Gold	7,500^{^}
United Kingdom (BPI)	Gold	121,397
United States	—	405,000
^{*} Sales figures based on certification alone.^{^} Shipments figures based on certification alone.^{‡} Sales+streaming figures based on certification alone.
