= Re:covered =

- Developed by: Dermot O'Leary
- Presented by: Dermot O'Leary

Production
- Executive producer: Conor McAnally

Original release
- Release: 10 October 2002 – 18 July 2003

Re:covered was a music television show broadcast in the UK on BBC Choice in 2002 and hosted by Dermot O'Leary. Each of the ten half-hour shows featured three bands or artists who, in turn, played two songs – a current track of their own, and a cover version of their choice.

A Re:covered Elvis special left this usual format with artists performing just Elvis tracks – including The Flaming Lips performing Suspicious Minds, Sugababes performing Hound Dog and McAlmont and Butler performing Burning Love.

== Transmissions ==
Series	Episodes	Originally released		
Series	Episodes	First released	Last released	Network
1	TBA	10 October 2002	2003	BBC Choice
2	TBA	2003	18 July 2003	BBC Three

== Episodes ==
=== Series 1 (2002–03) ===
No.	Title	Original release date
TBA	"Ash, Idlewild and Al."	10 October 2002
Ash perform Burn Baby Burn and the Buzzcocks' I Don't Mind; Idlewild play American English and their take on the Cure's Boys Don't Cry; Al deliver their rendition of Bryan Adams 's Summer of 69 plus their own track Make It Good.
TBA	"Travis, Gabrielle and Mercury Rev."	15 October 2002
TBA	"Muse and Jamiroquai."	16 October 2002
TBA	"Elvis Presley Special"	18 October 2002
Ronan Keating performs In the Ghetto; The Flaming Lips perform Suspicious Minds; Liberty X performs Hound Dog; McAlmont and Butler perform Burning Love; Darren Hayes performs Can't Help Falling in Love.
TBA	"Suede and Puddle of Mudd"	22 October 2002
TBA	"The Cure, Elbow and Ms Dynamite."	23 October 2002
Ms Dynamite performs It Takes More and; Barrington Levy joins her for his own Too Experienced; The Cure play Love Song and Thin Lizzy 's Don't Believe a Word; Elbow play Black Sabbath's The Wizzard, as well as their own Red.
TBA	"Darren Hayes and the Flaming Lips"	24 October 2002
TBA	"Stereophonies, the Pet Shop Boys and Natalie Imbruglia."	22 December 2002
TBA	"Ronan Keating, Garbage"	23 December 2002
Ronan Keating performs If Tomorrow Never Comes and Van Morrison 's Brown Eyed Girl; Garbage play Shut Your Mouth and the Rolling Stones' Wild Horses and Blue give their rendition of Boyz II Men's Waters Run Dry plus their own Long Time.
TBA	"Doves, Liberty X, and The Vines"	24 December 2002
Doves perform Pounding and the Smiths' Please, Please, Please, Let Me Get What I Want; Liberty X give Just a Little and Radiohead's High and Dry; The Vines play Get Free and Outkast's Ms Jackson.
TBA	"The Bluetones, Mis-teeq and Starbucks"	25 December 2002
The Bluetones perform TLC's Waterfalls and Solomon Bites the Worm; Mis-teeq offer Roll On, HeyMrDJ plus Montell Jordan 's This Is How We Do It; Starbucks play David Lee Roth 's Just like Paradise.
TBA	"Gabrielle, Mercury Rev, and Travis"	27 December 2002
Gabrielle performs her own Out of Reach and Carole King 's It's Too Late; Mercury Rev play their Little Rhymes and Black Sabbath 's Planet Caravan; Travis offer their Flowers in the Window and Queen's Killer Queen
TBA	"Black Rebel Motorcycle Club, Morcheeba and Wyclef Jean"	27 December 2002
Black Rebel Motorcycle Club cover a song by Johnny Cash; Morcheeba cover a song by Billie Holiday; Wyclef Jean cover a song by Bob Dylan
TBA	"Suede, Beverley Knight, Puddle of Mudd"	30 December 2002
Suede perform Beautiful Loser and Blondie's Union City Blue; Beverley Knight sings Gold and Chaka Khan 's I Feel for You; Puddle of Mudd play Alice in Chains' Brother plus their own Blurry.
TBA	"Darren Hayes, The Flaming Lips, McAlmont and Butler"	1 January 2003
Darren Hayes performs Strange Relationship and Marvin Gaye 's Sexual Healing; The Flaming Lips play Do You Realise? and Kylie Minogue's Can't Get You Out of My Head; McAlmont & Butler sing Fat Larry's Band's Zoom plus their own Falling.

=== Series 2 (2003) ===
No.	Title	Original release date
TBA	"Jamiroquai, Atomic Kitten and Muse"	4 April 2003
Jamiroquai covers Roxy Music; Atomic Kitten cover Martha and the Vandellas; Muse cover's Andy Williams.
TBA	"Sugababes, the Cardigans and Feeder"	11 April 2003
Sugababes: Freak like Me, Adamski's Killer; The Cardigans: For What It's Worth, a Black Sabbath song; Feeder: Forget about Tomorrow, a Frankie Goes to Hollywood song
TBA	"Robert Plant, Jamelia, Mull Historical Society"	18 April 2003
Robert Plant performs Love's "Seven and Seven Is" and Tim Buckley's Song to the Siren.; Jamelia cover a Stereophonics song; Mull Historical Society cover a Ms. Dynamite.song
TBA	"Ian McCullocks, Appleton, Ok Go"	25 April 2003
Ian McCulloch performs his song Sliding and the Velvet Underground's I'm Waiting for the Man.; Appleton choose Crowded House's Weather with You, their own Don't Worry; OK Go cover Oliver's Army by Elvis Costello and the Attractions alongside their own "Get over It".
TBA	"Reef, Harry, and Athlete"	2 May 2003
Reef take on Black Sabbath's War Pigs and their own Naked; Harry covers Blondie's One Way or Another and Belouis Some's Imagination; Athlete run through their track Westside and Kiss by Prince.
TBA	"Placebo, The Thrills, Big Brovaz"	9 May 2003
Placebo perform The Bitter End and the Pixies song Where is My Mind?; The Thrills take on Michael Jackson's Billie Jean; Big Brovaz offer their rendition of Favourite Things from the musical The Sound of Music.
TBA	"Dirty Vegas, Atomic Kitten, Good Charlotte"	16 May 2003
Dirty Vegas perform the Rolling Stones track You Can't Always Get What You Want; Atomic Kitten do the Beatles's "Ticket to Ride"; Good Charlotte offer their rendition of Acquiesce by Oasis.
TBA	"Hell is for Heroes, Mis-Teeq, Evan Dando"	30 May 2003
Hell is for Heroes perform the Cure's Boys Don't Cry; Mis-Teeq offer their rendition of Alanis Morissette's Ironic; Evan Dando does Barry McGuire's "Eve of Destruction".
TBA	"Skin, Jonny Marr, Busted"	6 June 2003
Skin performs Elbow's Red; Johnny Marr and the Healers do Bob Dylan's Don't Think Twice, it's Alright; Busted offer their rendition of the Simon and Garfunkel track Mrs Robinson.
TBA	"Craig David, Turin Brakes, InMe"	20 June 2003
Craig David performs the Beatles's track "Come Together"; Turin Brakes do AC/DC's "What's Next to the Moon"; InMe offer their version of "Creep" by Radiohead. With Dermot O'Leary. (W)
TBA	"Macy Gray, Abs, Ed Harcourt"	11 July 2003
Macy Gray covers a Cole Porter song; Abs covers a Kool and the Gang song Ed Harcourt covers a David Bowie.
TBA	"Melanie C, Eighties Matchbox B-Line Disaster, Daniel Bedingfield"	18 July 2003
Melanie C, Eighties Matchbox B-Line Disaster and Daniel Bedingfield perform tracks by Stevie Wonder and T Rex. Last in the series. (W)
