= Hell, Grand Cayman =

Geological formation and tourist attraction in West Bay, Cayman Islands

Coordinates: 19.37935°N 81.40678°W

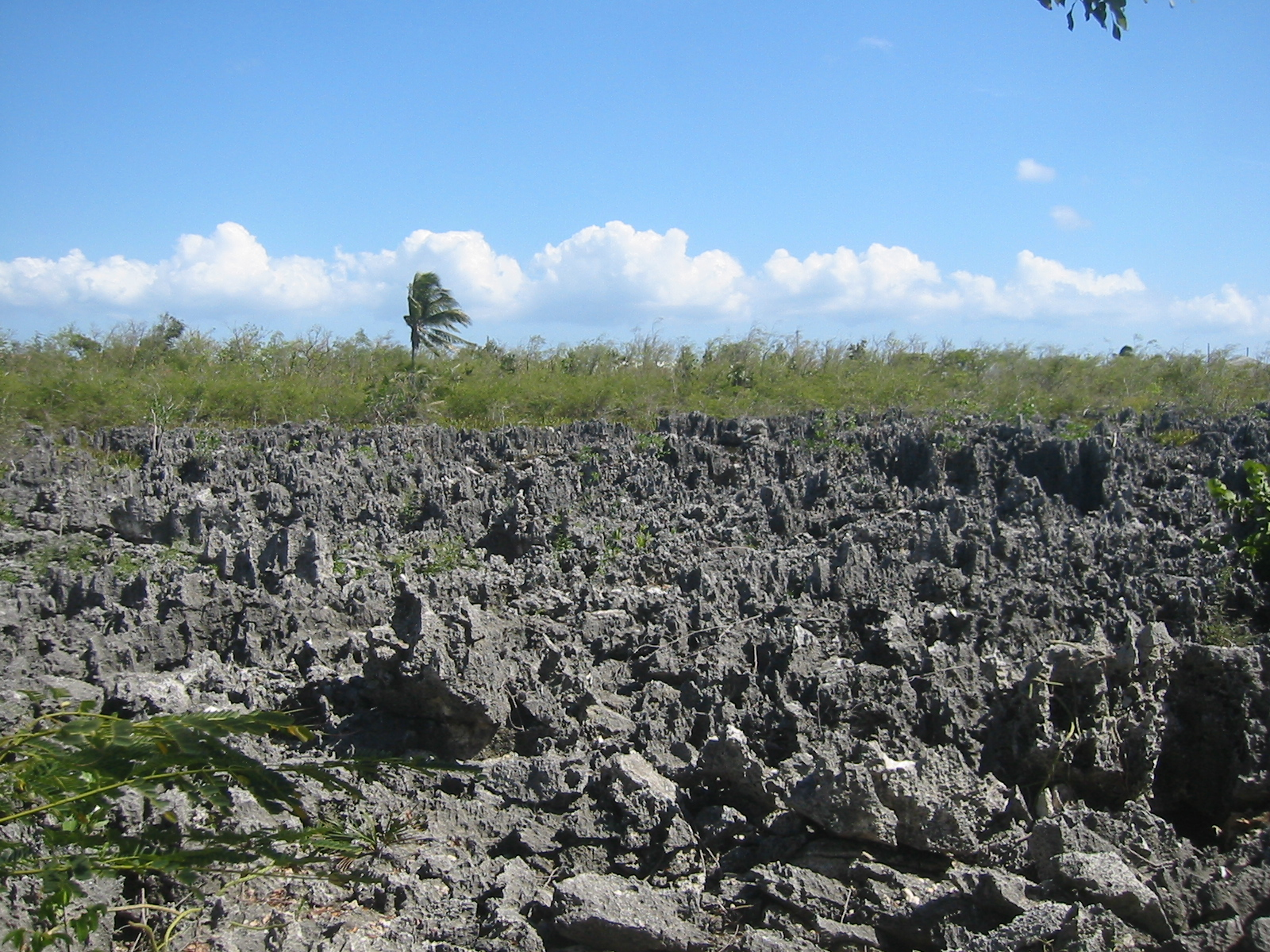
Hell, Grand Cayman island

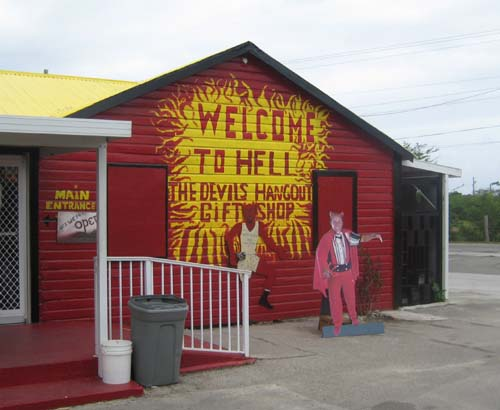
Hell's Gift Shop, Hell, Grand Cayman island

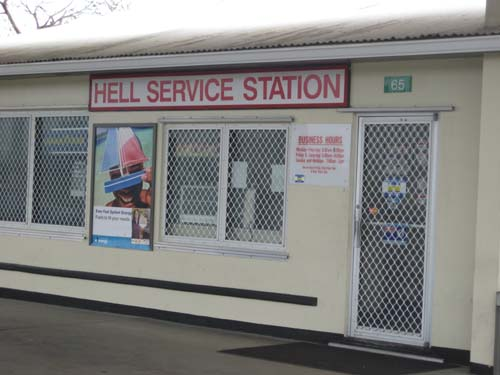
Hell's Service Station, Hell, Grand Cayman island

Hell is an area within the district of West Bay, Grand Cayman. Its name comes from a group of short, black, limestone formations located in the area. Its eerie and rather sinister look is what gave it its infamous name. It is roughly the size of half a football field. Visitors are not permitted to walk on the limestone formations but viewing platforms are provided. A gift shop and service station is located in the area, and art depicting Satan can be seen when entering.

== Etymology ==
There are numerous versions of how Hell received its name, but they are generally variations on "a ministration exclaimed, 'This is what Hell must look like.'"

It is also claimed that the name "Hell" is derived from the fact that if a pebble is thrown out into the formation, it echoes among the limestone peaks and valleys and sounds as if the pebble is falling all the way down to "Hell."

Regardless of how it first came to be called Hell, the name stuck and the area has become a tourist attraction, featuring a fire-engine red hell-themed post office from which you can send "postcards from hell", and a gift shop with "Satan" Ivan Farrington passing out souvenirs while greeting people with phrases like "How the hell are you?" and "Where the hell are you from?"

Some of the stores in the area feature prominent quotations from the Bible on their sides. This is due to the pious and religious nature of Caymanian society.
