= Cherry Lips =

2002 single by Garbage

Single by Garbage

from the album Beautiful Garbage
- B-side: "Enough Is Never Enough"; "Use Me"
- Released: January 7, 2002
- Recorded: April–May 2001
- Studio: Sarm (Madison, Wisconsin)
- Genre: Alternative rock; Dance-rock; pop rock
- Length: 3:11
- Label: Mushroom UK
- Songwriter: Garbage
- Producer: Garbage

Garbage singles chronology
"Androgyny" (2001)	"Cherry Lips" (2002)	"Breaking Up the Girl" (2002)

Music video
- "Cherry Lips" on YouTube

"Cherry Lips", also known as "Cherry Lips (Go Baby Go!)" is a song written, recorded and produced by alternative rock group Garbage for their third studio album, Beautiful Garbage. It was released in early 2002 by Mushroom Records as second single from the album. In the years since release, "Cherry Lips" has become an enduring track for the band, an alternative rock LGBTQ anthem, and after almost two decades continues to resonate, being used as the home run song of the Milwaukee Brewers and in advertisement campaigns for Microsoft's Surface Go laptop tablets.

"Cherry Lips" was a hit in various countries including the UK, Ireland, and Italy, the latter of which it had been the sound of a prominent winter marketing campaign for Breil Stones, reaching No. 8 on the Italian charts. Like lead single "Androgyny", "Cherry Lips" was also a success in New Zealand and Australia, where it became Garbage's biggest hit single, spending five non-consecutive weeks in the top ten. "Cherry Lips" was ultimately certified Gold by the Australian Recording Industry Association.

As the first Garbage single fully released in the aftermath of the September 11 attacks, the band donated a percentage of the royalties generated from the sales of "Cherry Lips" to the International Red Cross.

== Song profile ==
"Cherry Lips" was written and recorded at Smart Studios in Madison, Wisconsin. Written just as Garbage were about to begin mixing their third album, "Cherry Lips" was a late inclusion to the album. The song began as a keyboard melody, and was originally known by the working title "Wonderjam", as the band were trying to channel a Stevie Wonder/Sly and the Family Stone vibe. While recording the song, Steve Marker played a tuba, and recorded the output of the audio being run through a wah-wah pedal. Daniel Shulman, at the end of his second set of scheduled bass sessions for the album, quickly created a sub-hook bassline for the chorus on a Sabre bass run through an Ampeg B15 amplifier. The band was happy with the bassline and used it on the final mix of "Cherry Lips". Shirley Manson described "Cherry Lips" as "an adrenaline rush" and "probably the most celebratory song we've ever written".

Shirley Manson wrote the lyrics based loosely around two novels she had just read, Sarah, which was about a transgender prostitute, and The Heart Is Deceitful Above All Things, written by author Laura Albert under the pseudonym of JT LeRoy. "I took a bit of poetic license, but I wrote it for JT. It's easily the most uplifting thing we've ever done. It sounds nothing like us; it sounds like a Shangri-Las song", Manson explained. Like the rest of the world, Manson had believed that LeRoy had been a teenage truck-stop hustler who'd escaped the streets to become a writer. Manson exchanged emails with LeRoy over the course of the album sessions. "I wanted to write an ode to transgender spirit, inspired by my interactions with this peculiar but emotionally generous creature I knew online as JT", Manson later recalled. On the Beautiful Garbage sleeve notes, Manson dedicated "Cherry Lips" to "The Terminator", another alias of JT LeRoy. In 2005, LeRoy was exposed as an invention of Laura Albert in articles published by Stephen Beachy, The New York Times and Vanity Fair. "I know a lot of people felt conned in the end," Manson explained. "I didn't. I just felt sad that a woman felt she would stand a better chance in the world if she was a man, that JT was 'dead' and wouldn't be part of my life anymore". Manson still felt that the books "remain a marvel and whoever wrote them is still a genius whether they are a man, woman or wilderbeast."

"We were in different headspaces every time we recorded, which is why every song is different," Manson later explained, ""Silence Is Golden" is probably the heaviest song we've ever recorded and "Cherry Lips" the poppiest. They're juxtaposed right next to each other." When Manson recorded her lead vocal, the takes were heavily EQ'd at the tracking stage ("lt was tracked that way for effect", explained engineer Billy Bush, "it sounded weirder that way!").

== Single release ==
The first territory to receive a "Cherry Lips" commercial release was Japan, where Sony Music Int'l issued a five-track CD maxi of "Cherry Lips" remixes on December 27, 2001 coinciding with the announcement of Garbage's upcoming tour dates in Tokyo and Osaka. In February 2002, Sony followed up the single by issuing Special Collection, an exclusive extended play collecting together the international b-sides with artwork from the "Cherry Lips" music video.

Across Europe, PIAS Recordings issued "Cherry Lips" on January 7, 2002, as a four-track maxi CD, two-track CD single and as a two-track 12-inch vinyl. At the end of January, in Switzerland the single debuted No. 95 and peaked at No. 85 three weeks later, before recharting at No. 100 for a single week at the end of February; while in Netherlands "Cherry Lips" debuted at No. 86 and climbed over three weeks to No. 80. In Spain, "Cherry Lips" reached No. 15 on the airplay chart, while in Belgium, the single made the Ultratip (sales and airplay) charts in both the Flanders region (at No. 18) and the Wallonia region (No. 12). In Italy, where "Cherry Lips" had been licensed to the Breil Stones Winter 2001/02 campaign advertisements, the single debuted at No. 8. "Cherry Lips" remained on the Italian top twenty for six weeks.

In Australia and New Zealand, "Cherry Lips" was serviced to clubs at the end of November. On December 3, "Cherry Lips" hit radio and music TV, and television advertisements for Beautiful Garbage began airing in the run up to the Christmas period, with heavy emphasis on "Cherry Lips". The "Cherry Lips" remixes peaked at No. 3 on the ARIA Club chart FMR scheduled the single to coincide with the Big Day Out rock festival, which Garbage were part of the line-up. The week before release, Beautiful Garbage climbed back up to No. 10 on the album chart, as "Cherry Lips" hit No. 2 on the airplay chart. "Cherry Lips" was issued to stores on January 14 as a 2×CD single set and debuted at No. 7 on the ARIA Singles Chart, both the second highest new entry, and Garbage's first Australian top ten single. On January 24, Garbage performed both "Cherry Lips" and "Androgyny" live on Channel V outside Fox Studios in Sydney. On the fourth week of release, the single reached No. 1 on the ARIA Alternative chart as "ARIA certified "Cherry Lips" gold for shipments of over 35,000 units. During this period, Beautiful Garbage climbed to No. 5 on the album chart, staying there for three weeks. On its fifth and sixth week, the single dropped to No. 12, and then reversed back up to the No. 10 spot, ultimately spending fifteen weeks on the charts In New Zealand, the band's performance in Auckland and airplay for the single resulted in Beautiful Garbage re-charting at No. 12 on the RIANZ album chart. "Cherry Lips" debuted three weeks later at No. 39, before climbing to peak at No. 22 by the start of March. Beautiful Garbage rebounded on the album chart at the end of the month, reaching number 16 in April.

"Cherry Lips" was originally scheduled to be issued in the United Kingdom to support Garbage's mini-tour of Europe in November 2001. The track and remixes were serviced to radio, while the commercial release was put on hold. Garbage performed the song on Later With Jools Holland, MTV's Morning Glory and on Radio One's Evening Session as well as pre-recording a performance for Top of the Pops. At the start of 2002, Garbage kicked off the rescheduled release of "Cherry Lips", performing the song on cd:uk, T4 and on the Pepsi Chart Show. Mushroom Records issued "Cherry Lips" to record stores on January 21 in a 12-inch vinyl format and a 2×CD single set. A week later, "Cherry Lips" debuted at No. 24 on the UK Singles Chart. The single dropped to No. 40 after three weeks. An internet-only remix of "Cherry Lips" produced by Girls Against Boys bassist Eli Janney was streamed online on various sites to promote the song. On February 1, Mushroom partnered with The Sun tabloid and Asda supermarket to give away a free CD titled Garbage:Sampler that included the "Cherry Lips" remix. In Ireland, "Cherry Lips" peaked at No. 27 on the Irish Singles Chart.

== Post release ==
Since its release, the song has been constantly performed at Garbage concerts. In March 2003, "Cherry Lips" featured on the PlayStation 2 game Amplitude. While playing the "Cherry Lips" level, the game shows footage taken from the "Breaking Up the Girl" music video. In 2007, "Cherry Lips" was remastered and included on Garbage's greatest hits album Absolute Garbage.

In December 2011, the song featured in an Actimel yoghurt spot in Italy. In 2012, the song featured on the band's second greatest hits album, The Absolute Collection, released in Australia and New Zealand ahead of Garbage's 2013 tour promoting Not Your Kind of People. In June 2013, the same week that Garbage's live Blu-ray/DVD "One Mile High... Live" was released, "Cherry Lips" re-charted at No. 89 on the UK Physical Singles chart.

In 2021, "Cherry Lips" was remastered by Heba Kadry for inclusion in the 20th Anniversary Edition of Beautiful Garbage out on November 5. In 2022, the song was used for the "Salmon Sisters" commercial of Microsoft's Surface Go and was included in the first episode of the Netflix series Heartbreak High. The same year, the song was remastered again for inclusion in Garbage's third greatest hits album Anthology, out on October 28.

== Critical reception ==
The reviews for "Cherry Lips" upon album impact and single release were mostly positive. In early press for Beautiful Garbage, Kerrang!'s Dom Lawson described it as "lavish trashy pop" while Will Stokes, a reviewer for Attitude, wrote "Has anything more funky than the bubble-gum flavoured "Cherry Lips" been written all year?" Billboard wrote "replete with "Chapel of Love" wedding-bell chimes, Garbage has created a storyline for film director Gus Van Sant."

Not all reviews were enthusiastic. A reviewer for NME wrote, ""Cherry Lips" sounds like Martine McCutcheon being told to have fun at gun-point". while in an album review for Rock Sound, referring to "Cherry Lips", Victoria Durham wrote "you can't help thinking that things have veered a little off course here".

== Music video ==
=== Dawn Shadforth concept ===
Knowing that the song had been inspired by the writing of JT LeRoy, director Dawn Shadforth presented a treatment for a stylized "Cherry Lips" video combining those sensibilities with 1960's biker movies and Japanese manga graphic novels. Shadforth envisioned the visual as a "celebration of extraordinariness and difference" populated by lizard people and set at an alternative universe truck stop where Garbage were the house band. Animated sequences would be cued to the guitar parts. The truck stop people would appear normal at first, but as they started to dance, hints of 'lizardness' would appear (flicking tongues, tails) with subtle prosthetics. The video would end with a hot rod race and a flying saucer, with Manson climbing on-board or the side of one of the cars. The shots were to be stylized: colourful people, cars and clothes against a starry night sky. Inside the cars, the lizard people would reveal the full extent of their real selves in strobe light shots. Despite Shadforth's music video for Kylie Minogue's "Can't Get You Out of My Head" then saturating music channels worldwide, Interscope chose to reject the treatment; "I feel broken hearted we never made it" Manson later recalled.

=== Joseph Kahn directed video ===
Garbage were digitally-removed from the "Cherry Lips" video to give the effect of invisibility.

The produced music video for "Cherry Lips" was directed by Joseph Kahn on a set installed in a loft located in Brooklyn, New York on October 22, 2001. The video was produced by Supermega/Palomar; collaborating on the music video were top hair artist Renato Campura, make-up artist Mathu Andersen and stylist Kithe Brewster. Visual effects were handled by Chris Watts.

The video treatment Kahn filmed featured Garbage performing in a loft space, but only seen on mirror reflections, on monitor displays or reflected in the camera lens. As the chorus begins, it becomes apparent that the band are invisible. The special effect was rendered by filming Garbage wrapped in green gauze suits under their clothing and digitally replacing their bodies with the background. The insides of their clothing were replaced using CGI. Monitors visible to the viewer were fed playback footage of the band performing 'as normal'. For the breakdown and coda, Manson removed her clothing (except her boots and gloves) and performed an invisible striptease, and then walked across the room towards a bathroom mirror displaying her composited reflection. The twist ending showed the invisible Manson urinating while standing up. Manson dyed her red hair to platinum blonde the night prior to the shoot. Kahn expressed concern over the change, as he felt Manson was strongly identified as a redhead. To complement her new colour, she was given a 1950s-era beige palette "for a glamorous but not overdone" look. Vig filmed all his close-up scenes at the start of the day; he had been suffering from a food poisoning infection. After filming some establishing shots with the band, a stand-in was used for his greenscreen parts. The set was dressed to resemble a strip club, vintage neon signs were procured from over the city to provide an authentic backdrop.

The "Cherry Lips" video premiered on Australia's Rage on December 3, on MTV Europe in the United Kingdom and on VIVA in Germany on December 17. MTV Europe required an edit to the scenes where Manson stamped on lightbulbs; an alternate edit was re-serviced with the scenes obscured in early 2002. VH1 continued to broadcast the original version. The "Cherry Lips" video was nominated for a Bulgarian MM Music Award in the category of Best Video by an International Act. The "Cherry Lips" video was first made commercially available in QuickTime format on the CD-ROM enhanced section of the "Cherry Lips" CD singles. A remastered version of the "Cherry Lips" music video was included on Garbage's 2007 greatest hits DVD Absolute Garbage, and made available as a digital download via online music services later the same year. The "Cherry Lips" video was uploaded to VEVO in 2010.

Manson admitted years later that she regretted the Joseph Kahn video: "We were quite literally blackmailed by our record company into making a video that we knew from the storyboard was a shockingly bad idea", she revealed. Duke Erikson thought that, despite people thinking that the video was "fun", the result didn't do anything for the song. The band claimed that Interscope spent $1,000,000 on the "Cherry Lips" video, and was made under pressure from their management through to the video commissioner at their label to keep MTV interested. "We fought so hard not to do it, but we didn't hold enough cards, and so were forced to capitulate."

== Remixes and alternate versions ==
Remixes commissioned for the commercial single release included club and dub mixes each from Dominican/American house music DJ/producer Roger Sanchez and UK-based producers Graham Simmons and Alun Harrison (under the name MaUVe), as well as a club mix from Scottish DJ/producer Howie B. All five mixes were serviced to clubs and specialist dance radio in November 2001. A further remix was completed by Girls Against Boys member Eli Janney titled DJEJ's Go-Go Jam and released as a streaming single via the Garbage website. In 2005, Garbage remixed "Cherry Lips" themselves (subtitling the remix "Le Royale mix") for the B-side of the "Why Do You Love Me" DVD single.

In 2007, the Roger Sanchez remix was remastered, edited and included on the Absolute Garbage bonus disc Garbage Mixes. In 2021, the radio edit of the Roger Sanchez "Tha S-Man's Release Mix" was released as digital single to promote the 20th Anniversary Edition of Beautiful Garbage.

== Commercial track listings ==
- UK CD1 Mushroom MUSH98CDS
1. "Cherry Lips (Go Baby Go!)" – 3:11
2. "Enough is Never Enough" – 4:08
3. "Cherry Lips (Go Baby Go!)" (Howie B remix) – 8:38
4. "Cherry Lips (Go Baby Go!)" (video) – 3:11
- UK CD2 Mushroom MUSH98CDSX
1. "Cherry Lips (Go Baby Go!)" – 3:11
2. "Use Me" – 4:34
3. "Cherry Lips (Go Baby Go!)" (Tha S-man's release edit) – 3:41
- UK 12-inch single Mushroom MUSH94T
1. "Cherry Lips (Go Baby Go!)" (Tha S-man's release mix) – 6:48
2. "Cherry Lips (Go Baby Go!)" (Dark vocal with a cappella) – 7:48
- European CD maxi [PIAS] 720.0098.122 MUSH98CDM
1. "Cherry Lips (Go Baby Go!)" – 3:11
2. "Enough is Never Enough" – 4:08
3. "Cherry Lips (Go Baby Go!)" (Howie B remix) – 8:38
4. "Cherry Lips (Go Baby Go!)" (Tha S-man's release mix) – 6:48
- European CD single [PIAS] 720.0098.124 MUSH98CDSE
1. "Cherry Lips (Go Baby Go!)" – 3:11
2. "Cherry Lips (Go Baby Go!)" (Tha S-man's release mix) – 6:48
- Europe 12-inch single [PIAS] 720.0098.122 MUSH94T
1. "Cherry Lips (Go Baby Go!)" (Tha S-man's release mix) – 6:48
2. "Cherry Lips (Go Baby Go!)" (Dark vocal with a cappella) – 7:48
- Australian CD1 FMR MUSH98CDS
1. "Cherry Lips (Go Baby Go!)" – 3:11
2. "Use Me" – 4:34
3. "Enough is Never Enough" – 4:08
4. "Cherry Lips (Go Baby Go!)" (Howie B remix) – 8:38
- Japanese CD; Australian CD2 Sony SICP-76/FMR MUSH98CDSX
1. "Cherry Lips (Go Baby Go!)" – 3:11
2. "Cherry Lips (Go Baby Go!)" (Tha S-man's release (edit) – 3:41
3. "Cherry Lips (Go Baby Go!)" (Howie B remix) – 8:38
4. "Cherry Lips (Go Baby Go!)" (Dark vocal with a cappella) – 7:48
5. "Cherry Lips (Go Baby Go!)" (Tha S-man's release mix) – 6:48

== Charts ==
=== Weekly charts ===
2002 weekly chart performance for "Cherry Lips"
Chart (2002)	Peak position
Australia (ARIA)	7
Belgium (Ultratip Bubbling Under Flanders)	18
Belgium (Ultratip Bubbling Under Wallonia)	12
Europe (Eurochart Hot 100)	78
Ireland (IRMA)	27
Italy (FIMI)	8
Netherlands (Single Top 100)	80
New Zealand (Recorded Music NZ)	22
Romania (Romanian Top 100)	19
Scotland (Official Charts Company)	17
Switzerland (Schweizer Hitparade)	85
UK Singles (Official Charts Company)	22
UK Indie (Official Charts)	3

2013 weekly chart performance for "Cherry Lips"
Chart (2013)	Peak position
UK Physical Singles (Official Charts Company)	89

=== Year-end charts ===
Year-end chart performance for "Cherry Lips"
Chart (2002)	Position
Australia (ARIA)	53

== Certifications ==
Region	Certification	Certified units/sales
Australia (ARIA)	Gold	35,000^{^}
^{^} Shipments figures based on certification alone.

== Release history ==
Release history and formats for "Cherry Lips"
Territory	Release date	Record label	Format	Reference
United Kingdom	November 2001	Mushroom Records UK	Airplay	
Europe	November 2001	PIAS Recordings	Airplay	
Australia	December 3, 2001	F MR	Airplay	
Japan	December 27, 2001	Sony Music Int'l	CD maxi	
Germany	January 7, 2002	PIAS Recordings	12-inch vinyl, CD maxi	
Europe	January 7, 2002	PIAS Recordings	CD maxi, CD single	
Poland	January 7, 2002	BMG	CD maxi	
Australia	January 14, 2002	FMR	2×CD single set	
New Zealand	January 14, 2002	FMR	2×CD single set	
United Kingdom	January 21, 2002	Mushroom Records UK	12-inch vinyl, 2×CD single set	
