= Androgyny (song) =

2001 single by Garbage

Single by Garbage

from the album Beautiful Garbage
- B-side: "Begging Bone"
- Released: August 27, 2001
- Recorded: January–May 2001
- Studio: Smart Studios (Madison, Wisconsin, United States)
- Genre: Alternative rock; electronica; pop rock; funk
- Length: 3:09
- Label: Mushroom UK; Interscope (North America)
- Songwriter: Garbage
- Producer: Garbage

Garbage singles chronology
"The World Is Not Enough" (1999)	"Androgyny" (2001)	"Cherry Lips" (2002)

Music video
- "Androgyny" on YouTube

"Androgyny" is a song released by American alternative rock group Garbage as the lead single from their third studio album, Beautiful Garbage. Released worldwide in 2001, "Androgyny" represented a shift in the group's style, overtly embracing current music elements into their repertoire. Drummer/producer Butch Vig explained: "To me, some of the most cutting edge music out there is in the Top 40. Some of the songs on Beautiful Garbage, like "Androgyny" and "Untouchable" are influenced by Timbaland and Dr. Dre."

Promotion for "Androgyny" and its parent album were put on hold in the wake of the September 11 terrorist attacks. The mixed reaction from both critics and Garbage's fanbase to "Androgyny" also contributed to its underperformance in Garbage's home markets of the United Kingdom, where "Androgyny" stalled outside the top twenty, and in the United States, where it failed to register on any Billboard charts. Across Europe, however, "Androgyny" gained significant traction at radio and video; "Androgyny" was also a notable success in Australia, where it became their highest-charting single at the time.

In 2016, Garbage performed "Androgyny" for the first time in fifteen years in Charlotte, North Carolina to highlight the controversial Public Facilities Privacy & Security Act that was being deliberated in the state at the time. The band are resolutely pro-trans rights. Later that year, band leader Shirley Manson spoke of "Androgyny": "As it turns out, the song was way ahead of its time. The subject matter is now very pertinent. But back then, it was considered a little strange, I guess".

== Song profile ==
Garbage began the process of writing, recording and self-produced their third album in April 2000 at their own Smart Studios in Madison, Wisconsin. The sessions for the record would last well into the following year; "Androgyny" becoming realised sometime in January 2001. Garbage had been making rough mixes of their work, and had moved a chunk from one musical piece into another to create what would end up as "Androgyny". A classical guitar part written for another song on the album, "Untouchable", was matched with a sparse drum machine pattern written for "Androgyny" during tracking stages. Although it sounded a little crude, the band felt that the piece had character; the band edited it with Pro Tools software and matched it with a synth melody. "It's really three songs stuck together," guitarist Duke Erikson later recalled, "The way we do things is almost like Cubism. It's different viewpoints of the same thing, jammed together on the one canvas". ""Androgyny" is a schizophrenic song", Steve Marker claimed, describing it as "lots of urban groove... then it's got a bit of that '60s fuzz guitar, loads of strings. There are like three or four different styles of music in it. It's basically just a weird song".

The majority of the recorded work on Beautiful Garbage was to analog tracked through a Trident A Range mixing console; then fed into Pro Tools for recording overdubs, editing and mixing. Originally the band had recorded a keyboard bassline during the verses; Daniel Shulman asked to perform organic bass on those parts instead. The band agreed; Shulman recorded those parts using a Fender Precision Bass Deluxe with the E String tuned down to D. While Shirley Manson's main vocals were generally not treated to the extent that they had on Garbage's first two albums, a lot of her backing vocals were; on "Androgyny" each vocal track was EQ'd and treated differently.

Lyrically, "Androgyny" was described by Shirley Manson as a "third-sex manifesto" for gender expression, adding that she thought that the world was fascinated with gender-bending and cross-dressing, and that she felt that people had become sick of being categorised in binary terms: "this overt sexualisation [of society]... has become so un-erotic, so un-mysterious, and so un-sexy". The band felt that "Androgyny" was a good choice as a lead single for Beautiful Garbage, as the song represented how the album veered to pop, more than the first two albums. "Starting off with something as quote unquote "poppy" as "Androgyny" was maybe where we wanted to go with this..." explained Erikson, "it sounds a lot different to what we've done before." Later Erikson told VH1, "["Androgyny"] encapsulates the mood of the record... each part of the song has a very drastic change and the record is full of extremes like that." He pointed out that despite the R&B verse, the song is recognisably Garbage because of the rock chorus; adding that the bridge also has a Philadelphia soul influence. "We combine different genres of music within a song... in that way, it's what we've always done."

== Single release ==
"Androgyny" received its world premiere radio broadcast on August 9, 2001, on Steve Lamacq's Evening Session on BBC Radio 1; this was followed up by pre-release broadcasts the next day on Nemone's Radio 1 show, and on Capital and XFM's breakfast shows. "Androgyny" was officially serviced to UK radio on August 13. "Androgyny" was C-listed at BBC Radio 1, Virgin, Red Dragon and Isle of Wight Radio. XFM's Arthur Baker premiered the Felix Da Housecat remix of "Androgyny" on his show on August 19, while The Architechs remix premiered on the Dreem Team's Radio 1 show on August 26. Both mixes were issued on 12-inch vinyl on August 20; the Felix Da Housecat mixes to nightclubs, while the Architechs remix was sent to specialist clubs. The "Androgyny" music video premiered on both MTV UK and VH1 on September 10; the following night's broadcast of the Mercury Music Prize event featured two teaser adverts during the commercial breaks to promote both "Androgyny" and Beautiful Garbage. "Androgyny" was B-listed at Radio One. Garbage spent a week in the United Kingdom to promote the single and album from September 17; recording a performance of "Androgyny" for Pepsi Chart Show, Top of The Pops and The Base to be broadcast after the single release. Shirley Manson co-hosted the Steve Lamacq Show on September 19. Garbage made their first live televised performance in nearly two years on September 22; performing "Androgyny" on cd:uk and the following day a live performance on T4 Popworld. Mushroom Records UK issued "Androgyny" on September 24 on three formats; a 2×CD single set and a 12-inch vinyl. Woolworths made "Androgyny" its 'Single of the Week'. "Androgyny" debuted at No. 24 on the UK Singles Chart, which was lower than any of the six singles Garbage released during the Version 2.0 album cycle. "Androgyny" dipped to No. 52 the following week, before leaving the Top 75 altogether.

In North America, Interscope scheduled "Androgyny" for impact on hot adult contemporary, triple A, and contemporary hit radio on August 27 and 28, 2001. Interscope announced that "Androgyny" had become the No. 1 'Most Added' track at pop, adult pop, and triple-A, while picking up notable adds at hot AC stations. The music video for "Androgyny" was premiered on both VH1 and MTV on September 10. Interscope partnered with Yahoo! Messenger to promote the release of "Androgyny" around the launch of their new instant messenger initiative termed IMVironments that allowed users to play music and Flash Video clips inside the IM window. Users were able to correspond within a Garbage-themed environment that included the "Androgyny" audio, a Flash montage of the band, a hyperlink to Launch.com to view the "Androgyny" video and a link to Yahoo! Music to purchase the new album. Following September 11, "Androgyny" lost any momentum at US radio; barely hanging on at Triple-A, where it was averaging around 100-150 plays a week. "[In the weeks following 9/11] radio banished all sorts of songs, anything weird at all. "Androgyny" wasn't going to fly for a second", Duke recalled.

To set up the release of both "Androgyny" and Beautiful Garbage, PIAS France serviced the video for "Androgyny" to music stations on September 13; "Androgyny" was playlisted by radio stations Europe 1, Europe 2, RTL, France Inter, Ouï FM, Sud Radio, FIP, WIT FM, Alouette FM, Le Moev' and Couleur 3, and by music channels MCM and MTV France, with specials broadcast by France 3 and M6 PIAS Germany serviced the music video to stations where it was playlisted by RTL II, VIVA, VIVA2, MTV Central and Onyx.tv; "Androgyny" was also well received by German radio, where it peaked at No. 57 on their airplay chart. On September 24, PIAS released a maxi CD single across Europe. In some countries such as Netherlands and Italy, PIAS also issued a two-track CD single; PIAS France imported the 12-inch single from the UK to distribute to national music stores. After its fifth week at radio, "Androgyny" reached No. 17 on the European airplay chart; the following week the song debuted and peaked at No. 70 on the European Hot 100 Singles chart. In the weeks after the Beautiful Garbage album debuted at No. 2 across Europe, "Androgyny" peaked at No. 11 on the airplay chart. In Russia, "Androgyny" peaked at No. 2 on Music & Media's airplay chart.

For the release of "Androgyny" in Australia, FMR set a radio premiere date of August 24 across the two countries, confident from early album previews across airplay formats that the single would potentially receive massive radio support. "Androgyny" became Garbage's first Top 10 Airplay hit in Australia. The physical single was released on September 24 as a maxi single featuring "Begging Bone", and the two Felix da Housecat and The Architechs remixes. "Androgyny" charted at No. 21 on the ARIA Charts and at No. 36 on the RIANZ singles chart. "Androgyny" stayed on the Australian chart for seven weeks, and on the New Zealand chart for thirteen, eventually rising to No. 17 on its eleventh week.

== Music video ==
An androgynous Shirley Manson in the "Androgyny" video.

The music video for "Androgyny" was directed by Don Cameron over a three-day London studio shoot commencing August 20, 2001. The video was produced by Tsunami/Method Films and its visual effects overseen by Smoke & Mirrors. Collaborating on the music video were top hair / make-up / stylists, British '60s airbrush artist Peter Barry and digital matte artists.

The concept for the "Androgyny" music video sought to redefine Shirley Manson as a fashion icon. Cameron framed Manson's on-screen performance and the bands' cameos in several graphic art directed environments, as well as placing the band within a cast setting for the first time: interspersed throughout the video is footage of multiple fashionable twenty-somethings seen swapping clothes and kisses in a public restroom as the band look on. Cameron also used post effects to make Manson appear as a visualization of androgyny. Clothing chosen by stylist were from Martine Sitbon, Benjamin Cho, Richard Saenz, and undisclosed designers. The creation of the "Androgyny" video involved the design of four different and individual effects. The opening section of the video presented Manson in a similar style of the classic Vladimir Tretchikoff Balinese girl paintings, created using matte painting and green screen. The footage was heavily treated and combined with multiple layers of painted elements to give Manson porcelain-like skin that is characteristic of Tretchikoff's work. The second section of the video that involves the use of CGI featured Manson dressed half in a man's suit and half in a women's suit; as Manson rotates on a turning pedestal, elements of her body and clothing morph. The limousine sequence, where Manson is seen chauffeuring a young couple down a stylised freeway, involved filming multiple motion control passes and painted/keyed elements. Motion control data was manipulated in post-production to remove the reflections of the set and creating reflections of the street lights and cityscape. The final sequence sees Manson performing in front of a city backdrop; this involved multiple layers of matte painted elements to create.

The music video began airing across Europe and North America on September 10, 2001. Music station VH1 paired its broadcasts of "Androgyny" with the band's earlier single "Only Happy When it Rains". In 2002, a QuickTime format of the "Androgyny" video was included on a promotional sampler CD-ROM titled Garbage:Sampler, given away by Mushroom Records UK in conjunction with The Sun newspaper and Asda supermarket. The "Androgyny" video was uploaded to VEVO in 2009.

== Remixes ==
A screenshot of the offline version of the "Androgyny" mixer.

The CD format of Beautiful Garbage contained an enhanced element where users could remix four tracks from the album, of which "Androgyny" was one of. Created in conjunction with Sonic Foundry, using a customized version of their drag-and-drop ACID Pro music sequencer software, the remixes utilized samples and loops taken directly from the actual songs. The enhanced section could be accessed when the user was online; a simplified version of the software featuring only "Androgyny" loops was accessible when the user was offline. The offline 'soundtoy' featuring "Androgyny" loops and samples was later included on the Garbage:Sampler CD-ROM.

Interscope Records and Sonic Foundry launched a competition in November 2001, in which fans were invited to remix "Androgyny" by downloading free ACID Xpress software. Entrants could then upload their work to a specially created website (www.acidgarbage.com) to stream their mixes online. The winner received copies of Sonic Foundry's ACID Pro 3.0, Sound Forge 5.0, Vegas Audio 2.0, and five loop libraries.

Remixes commissioned for the single release included club and dub mixes each from UK garage outfit The Architechs and Chicago house and electroclash DJ Felix da Housecat. His "Thee Glitz" remix was notably included on the 2003 2 Many DJs landmark mashup album As Heard on Radio Soulwax Pt. 2, and later remastered and included on the bonus disc of Garbage's 2007 greatest hits album Absolute Garbage. Interscope paid $75,000 for a funk remix of "Androgyny" by Pharrell Williams and Chad Hugo, an American production duo known as The Neptunes with scheduled plans for it to be serviced to radio and clubs. A remix by Missy Elliott was also in the works; Butch Vig told NME: "We've talked about either "Androgyny" or "Untouchable". We'll send it off to her and say, Missy, do your thing, do whatever you want with it, because we love her and love her sensibility which she brings to it."

== Critical reception ==
"Androgyny" was met with a mixed reception upon its late 2001 release. In early press, Kerrang!'s Dom Lawson described it as "pretty collides with sterile" and "glistening"; while a reviewer for Heat claimed ""Androgyny" is a bewitching record, pirouetting between pop, rock and funk". Much comment was made on the songs notable genre-crossover from alternative rock. In an album review for Classic Rock, Jerry Ewing wrote: "With its playful "boys in the girl's room, girls in the men's room" refrain, ["Androgyny"] works its seductive rhythms very much into R&B territory, yet remains undeniably Garbage-like in sound." Q' magazine's Paul Elliot wrote ""Androgyny"s R&B stutter evokes Destiny's Child, essentially pop, but not without depth", while in their album review, Ian Griffiths wrote that Beautiful Garbage was the band's best album to date, pointing out that "Androgyny" radiated "coy brooding". David Stubbs of Uncut agreed that the album was the band's best yet, writing "Androgyny" recalls Prince at his most funkily fluid and puckish, imagining a world where gender barriers are broken down." Barry Divola of WHO magazine wrote "Note to R&B stars who are having trouble getting Timbaland to free up his schedule: hire Garbage. They may technically be a rock band, but you wouldn't know it from "Androgyny", with its loops, syncopated rhythm and severely cut-up instrumentation". In an album review for Rock Sound, Victoria Durham called the lyrics "tiresome", while comparing the song's intro to Madonna. "If current single "Androgyny" is meant to be a new direction, it isn't a bad one, a chunky riff set to a nu-soul production job", wrote The List, "Lyrically though, the band are still confusing the deviant with the dull".

== Track listings ==
- European CD single Play It Again, Sam MUSH94CDSE
1. "Androgyny" – 3:09
2. "Androgyny" (Thee Glitz mix) – 6:07
- UK 12-inch single Mushroom MUSH94T
1. "Androgyny" (Thee Glitz mix) – 6:07
2. "Androgyny" (The Architechs mix) – 4:57
- UK CD1 Mushroom MUSH94CDS
1. "Androgyny" – 3:09
2. "Begging Bone" – 3:55
3. "Androgyny" (Thee Glitz mix) – 6:07
- UK CD2 Mushroom MUSH94CDSX
1. "Androgyny" – 3:09
2. "Androgyny" (The Neptunes remix) – 3:18
3. "Androgyny" (The Architechs mix) – 4:57
- Australian CD maxi Festival MUSH94CDM
- European CD maxi Play It Again, Sam MUSH94CDM
- Poland CD maxi BMG 74321 89397 2
- South Africa CD maxi David Gresham CDSDGR 46
1. "Androgyny" – 3:09
2. "Begging Bone" – 3:55
3. "Androgyny" (Thee Glitz mix) – 6:07
4. "Androgyny" (The Architechs mix) – 4:57
- Japan CD maxi Sony Music Int'l SRCS-2507
1. "Androgyny" – 3:09
2. "Androgyny" (Thee Glitz mix) – 6:07
3. "Androgyny" (The Architechs mix) – 4:57
4. "Androgyny" (Thee Drum Drum mix) – 4:35

== Charts ==
Chart performance for "Androgyny"
Chart (2001)	Peak position
Australia (ARIA)	21
Belgium (Flanders) Ultratip 50 (GfK)	10
Belgium (Wallonia) GfK Ultratip 50 (GfK)	5
Canada Singles (SoundScan)	19
European Hot 100 Singles (Music & Media)	70
Germany (Media Control)	93
Ireland (IRMA)	39
Italy (FIMI)	35
Netherlands (Dutch Top 40 Tipparade)	4
Netherlands (Single Top 100)	71
New Zealand (RIANZ)	17
Scotland (Official Charts Company)	22
Spain (AFYVE)	11
Sweden Sverigetopplistan (SRIA)	54
Switzerland Singles Top 100 (Media Control)	67
UK Singles (Official Charts Company)	24
UK Indie (OCC)	5

== Release history ==
Release history and formats for "Androgyny"
Territory	Release date	Record Label	Format	Reference
United Kingdom	August 13, 2001	Mushroom Records UK	Airplay	
Australia	August 24, 2001	Festival Mushroom Records	Airplay	
Canada	August 27, 2001	Universal Music Canada	Airplay	
United States	August 27, 2001	Interscope	Hot adult contemporary; triple A radio	
United States	August 28, 2001	Interscope	Contemporary hit radio	
Japan	September 19, 2001	Sony Music Int'l	CD maxi	
United Kingdom	September 24, 2001	Mushroom Records UK	12-inch vinyl, 2×CD single set	
Western Europe	September 24, 2001	PIAS Recordings	12-inch vinyl, CD maxi, CD single	
Eastern Europe	September 24, 2001	BMG	CD maxi	
Australia	September 24, 2001	Festival Mushroom Records	CD maxi	
New Zealand	September 24, 2001	Festival Mushroom Records	CD maxi	
South Africa	September 24, 2001	David Gresham Records	CD maxi	
