= Garbage discography =

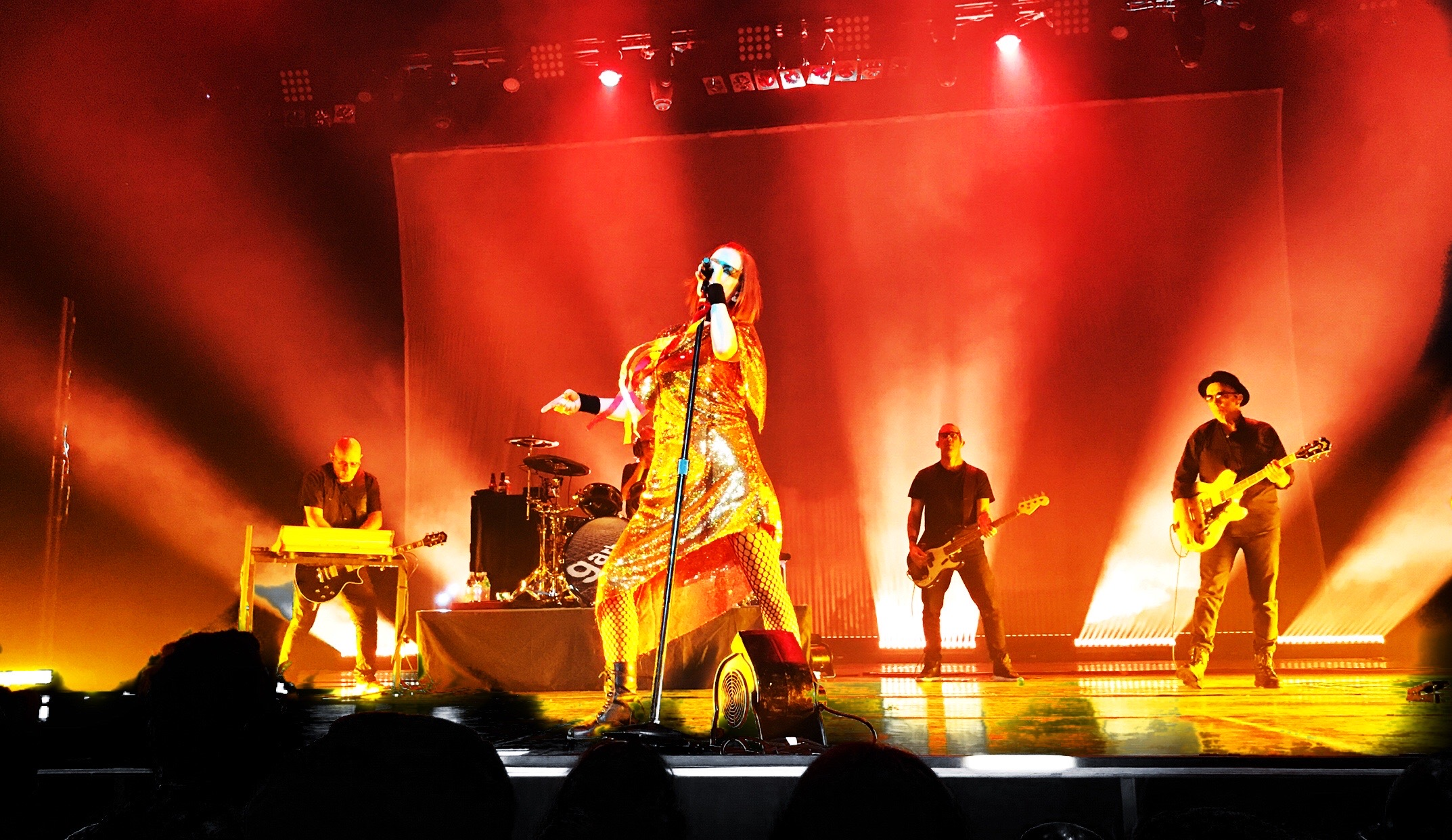
- Garbage performing in Reno, October 2018
- Studio albums: 8
- Extended plays: 1
- Compilation albums: 3
- Singles: 41
- Video albums: 3
- Music videos: 44
- Remix albums: 1
- Promotional singles: 4

Garbage is an American rock band formed in Madison, Wisconsin, in 1993. The group's discography consists of eight studio albums, three compilation albums, one remix album, one extended play, 41 singles, four promotional singles, three video albums, and 44 music videos (many of which are alternate versions to the same song). The line-up consists of Scottish vocalist Shirley Manson and Americans Duke Erikson, Steve Marker, and Butch Vig. They have amassed worldwide album sales of over 17 million units.

Garbage released a string of increasingly successful singles in 1995 and 1996, including "Queer", "Only Happy When It Rains", and "Stupid Girl". Their debut album, Garbage, charted in the top 20 in six countries and was certified double platinum in the United States, United Kingdom, Canada, and Australia. Garbage spent two years working on their follow-up album, Version 2.0, which charted in the top 20 in 12 countries and was certified platinum in four countries and the European Union.

The band recorded the theme song of the 1999 James Bond film The World Is Not Enough. The band's third album, Beautiful Garbage (2001), failed to match the commercial success achieved by its predecessors. Garbage quietly disbanded in late 2003, but regrouped to complete their fourth album Bleed Like Me in 2005, peaking at a career-high number four on the Billboard 200. The band cut short their concert tour in support of Bleed Like Me, announcing an "indefinite hiatus". Garbage reconvened in 2007 and released a greatest hits compilation, Absolute Garbage. The band's fifth studio album, Not Your Kind of People, was released on May 15, 2012, through the band's own label, Stunvolume.

Garbage and Screaming Females recorded a cover of "Because the Night" for Record Store Day 2013. They released a video directed by Sophie Muller. The band released their first live DVD, One Mile High... Live, in May 2013. Strange Little Birds, the band's sixth studio album, was released on June 10, 2016. On March 30, 2021, Garbage released the song "The Men Who Rule the World", the lead single from their seventh studio album, No Gods No Masters, which was released on June 11, 2021.

On September 7, 2022, Garbage announced their third greatest hits album Anthology, released on October 28. The compilation features 35 newly remastered tracks celebrating three decades of their career, including "Witness to Your Love". On November 29, 2024, the band released their first cover collection, Copy/Paste, as a Record Store Day Black Friday exclusive. The compilation album includes ten classic songs covered by Garbage over the course of almost thirty years. On February 27, 2025, the band announced their eighth studio album, Let All That We Imagine Be the Light, which was released on May 30.

== Albums ==
=== Studio albums ===
List of studio albums, with selected chart positions, sales figures and certifications
Title	Details	Peak chart positions										Certifications	Sales
Title	Details	US	AUS	AUT	CAN	FRA	GER	NZ	SWE	SWI	UK	Certifications	Sales
Garbage	Released: August 15, 1995; Label: Almo; Formats: CD, LP, cassette, digital download	20	4	—	15	16	55	1	19	—	6	RIAA: 2× Platinum; ARIA: 2× Platinum; BPI: 2× Platinum; MC: 2× Platinum; RMNZ: 2× Platinum; SNEP: Gold	World: 4,000,000; US: 2,400,000; GER: 230,000; UK: 701,757
Version 2.0	Released: May 12, 1998; Label: Almo; Formats: CD, LP, cassette, digital download	13	5	4	2	1	4	1	12	17	1	RIAA: Platinum; ARIA: Platinum; BPI: 2× Platinum; MC: Platinum; IFPI: Platinum; IFPI SWE: Gold; RMNZ: Platinum; SNEP: 2× Gold	World: 4,000,000; US: 1,700,000; UK: 579,912
Beautiful Garbage	Released: October 2, 2001; Label: Interscope; Formats: CD, LP, cassette, MiniDisc, digital download	13	1	9	6	3	6	2	29	10	6	ARIA: 2× Platinum; BPI: Gold; MC: Gold; RMNZ: Gold	US: 405,000; UK: 121,397
Bleed Like Me	Released: April 12, 2005; Label: Geffen; Formats: CD, LP, cassette, digital download	4	4	17	9	6	12	25	7	15	4	ARIA: Gold; BPI: Silver	US: 284,000; UK: 84,339
Not Your Kind of People	Released: May 15, 2012; Label: Stunvolume; Formats: CD, LP, digital download	13	8	39	17	15	15	32	—	15	10		US: 98,000
Strange Little Birds	Released: June 10, 2016; Label: Stunvolume; Formats: CD, LP, digital download	14	9	17	69	23	22	18	—	16	17		US: 20,000
No Gods No Masters	Released: June 11, 2021; Label: Stunvolume / Infectious Music; Formats: CD, LP, digital download	33	5	13	—	40	6	34	—	13	5		
Let All That We Imagine Be the Light	Released: May 30, 2025; Label: Stunvolume / BMG; Formats: CD, LP, digital download	— (Note: Let All That We Imagine Be the Light did not enter the Billboard 200, but peaked at number 8 on the Top Album Sales chart.)	87	10	—	104	17	—	—	24	24		
"—" denotes a recording that did not chart or was not released in that territory.

=== Compilation albums ===
List of compilation albums, with selected chart positions and sales figures
Title	Details	Peak chart positions										Sales	Certifications
Title	Details	US	AUS	BEL	CAN	GER	IRE	ITA	SPA	SWI	UK	Sales	Certifications
Absolute Garbage	Released: July 23, 2007; Label: Almo, Geffen, UM^{e}; Formats: CD, digital download	68	18	28	43	68	22	79	59	77	11	US: 66,000	BPI: Silver
The Absolute Collection	Released: November 2, 2012; Label: Liberation Music; Formats: CD, digital download	—	88	—	—	—	—	—	—	—	—		
Anthology	Released: October 28, 2022; Label: Stunvolume / BMG; Formats: 2CDs, 2LPs, digital download	—	—	110	—	54	—	—	49	—	99		
Copy/Paste	Released: November 29, 2024; Label: BMG; Formats: LP, digital download	—	—	—	—	—	—	—	—	—	—		
"—" denotes a recording that did not chart or was not released in that territory.

=== Remix albums ===
Title	Details
Version 2.0: The Official Remixes	Released: July 6, 2018; Label: Almo, Interscope; Format: Digital download

== Extended plays ==
Title	Details
Special Collection	Released: February 6, 2002; Label: Sony Music Japan; Format: CD
Witness to Your Love	Released: April 22, 2023; Label: BMG; Format: Vinyl (original), digital (on April 28, 2023)
Lie to Me	Released: April 20, 2024; Label: BMG; Format: Vinyl (original), digital (on May 3, 2024)

== Singles ==
List of singles, with selected chart positions and certifications, showing year released and album name
Title	Year	Peak chart positions										Certifications	Album
Title	Year	US	US Alt	AUS	CAN	GER	IRE	NL	NZ	SWI	UK	Certifications	Album
"Vow"	1995	97	26	32	—	—	—	—	41	—	138		Garbage
"Subhuman"	1995	—	—	—	—	—	—	—	—	—	50		Non-album single
"Only Happy When It Rains"	1995	55	16	80	79	—	—	36	38	—	29		Garbage
"Queer"	1995	— (Note: "Queer" did not enter the Billboard Hot 100, but peaked at number 57 on the Radio Songs chart.)	12	55	—	—	—	—	37	—	13		Garbage
"Stupid Girl"	1996	24	2	47	30	—	16	—	32	—	4	BPI: Silver; RMNZ: Gold	Garbage
"Milk"	1996	— (Note: "Milk" did not enter the Billboard Hot 100, but peaked at number four on the Bubbling Under Hot 100 Singles chart.)	—	44	—	84	—	—	50	—	10		Garbage
"#1 Crush"	1997	— (Note: "#1 Crush" did not enter the Billboard Hot 100, but peaked at number 29 on the Radio Songs chart.)	1	—	20	—	—	—	—	—	—		Romeo + Juliet OST
"Push It"	1998	52	5	31	—	88	26	77	15	—	9		Version 2.0
"I Think I'm Paranoid"	1998	— (Note: "I Think I'm Paranoid" did not enter the Billboard Hot 100, but peaked at number 70 on the Radio Songs chart.)	6	57	—	98	—	94	19	—	9		Version 2.0
"Special"	1998	52	11	54	42	—	—	—	—	—	15		Version 2.0
"When I Grow Up"	1999	—	23	22	—	—	28	—	24	—	9		Version 2.0
"The Trick Is to Keep Breathing"	1999	—	—	—	—	— (Note: "The Trick Is to Keep Breathing" did not enter the German Singles Chart, but peaked at number 102 on the German Airplay Chart.)	—	—	—	—	—		Version 2.0
"You Look So Fine"	1999	—	—	101	—	—	—	—	—	—	19		Version 2.0
"The World Is Not Enough"	1999	—	—	—	—	38	30	48	—	16	11		The World Is Not Enough OST
"Androgyny"	2001	—	—	21	19	93	39	71	17	67	24		Beautiful Garbage
"Cherry Lips (Go Baby Go!)"	2002	—	—	7	—	—	27	80	22	85	22	ARIA: Gold	Beautiful Garbage
"Breaking Up the Girl"	2002	—	— (Note: "Breaking Up the Girl" did not enter the Billboard Alternative Airplay chart, but peaked at number 12 on the Adult Alternative Airplay chart.)	19	—	—	—	—	—	—	27		Beautiful Garbage
"Shut Your Mouth"	2002	—	—	74	—	—	—	—	—	—	20		Beautiful Garbage
"Why Do You Love Me"	2005	94	8	19	12	63	27	100	—	75	7		Bleed Like Me
"Bleed Like Me" (Note: A remix of "Bleed Like Me" by Eric Kupper also peaked at number six on the Hot Dance Music/Club Play chart.)	2005	—	27	—	—	—	—	—	—	—	—		Bleed Like Me
"Sex Is Not the Enemy"	2005	—	—	—	—	—	—	—	—	—	24		Bleed Like Me
"Run Baby Run"	2005	—	—	47	—	97	—	—	—	—	—		Bleed Like Me
"Tell Me Where It Hurts"	2007	—	—	—	—	—	—	—	—	—	50		Absolute Garbage
"Blood for Poppies"	2012	— (Note: "Blood for Poppies" did not enter the Billboard Hot 100, but peaked at number 13 on the Hot Singles Sales chart.)	17	—	—	—	—	—	—	—	—		Not Your Kind of People
"Battle in Me"	2012	—	—	—	—	—	—	—	—	—	—		Not Your Kind of People
"Big Bright World"	2012	—	—	—	—	—	—	—	—	—	—		Not Your Kind of People
"Control"	2012	—	—	—	—	—	—	—	—	—	—		Not Your Kind of People
"Because the Night" (with Screaming Females)	2013	— (Note: "Because the Night" did not enter the Billboard Hot 100, but peaked at number 23 on the Hot Singles Sales chart.)	—	—	—	—	—	—	—	—	—		Non-album singles
"Girls Talk" (with Brody Dalle)	2014	— (Note: "Girls Talk" did not enter the Billboard Hot 100, but peaked at number 10 on the Hot Singles Sales chart.)	—	—	—	—	—	—	—	—	—		Non-album singles
"The Chemicals" (with Brian Aubert)	2015	—	—	—	—	—	—	—	—	—	—		Non-album singles
"Empty"	2016	—	39	—	—	—	—	—	—	—	—		Strange Little Birds
"Magnetized"	2016	—	—	—	—	—	—	—	—	—	—		Strange Little Birds
"No Horses"	2017	—	—	—	—	—	—	—	—	—	—		Non-album singles
"Destroying Angels" (with John Doe and Exene Cervenka)	2018	—	—	—	—	—	—	—	—	—	—		Non-album singles
"The Men Who Rule the World"	2021	—	—	—	—	—	—	—	—	—	—		No Gods No Masters
"No Gods No Masters"	2021	—	—	—	—	—	—	—	—	—	—		No Gods No Masters
"Wolves"	2021	—	— (Note: "Wolves" did not enter the Billboard Alternative Airplay chart, but peaked at number 37 on the Adult Alternative Airplay chart.)	—	—	—	—	—	—	—	—		No Gods No Masters
"Witness to Your Love"	2022	—	—	—	—	—	—	—	—	—	—		Anthology
"Cities in Dust"	2023	—	—	—	—	—	—	—	—	—	—		Witness to Your Love
"There's No Future in Optimism"	2025	—	—	—	—	—	—	—	—	—	—		Let All That We Imagine Be the Light
"Get Out My Face AKA Bad Kitty"	2025	—	—	—	—	—	—	—	—	—	—		Let All That We Imagine Be the Light
"—" denotes a recording that did not chart or was not released in that territory.

=== Promotional singles ===
List of promotional singles, with selected chart positions, showing year released and album name
Title	Year	Peak chart positions	Album
Title	Year	SPA Airplay	Album
"Supervixen"	1996	—	Garbage
"Temptation Waits"	1999	39	Version 2.0
"Automatic Systematic Habit"	2012	—	Not Your Kind of People
"Even Though Our Love Is Doomed"	2016	—	Strange Little Birds
"—" denotes a recording that did not chart or was not released in that territory.

== Other appearances ==
=== Studio tracks ===
Year	Song	Release
1996	"Kick My Ass"	Sweet Relief II: Gravity of the Situation
2002	"I Just Want to Have Something to Do"	We're a Happy Family: A Tribute to Ramones
2008	"All the Good in This Life"	Songs for Tibet: The Art of Peace
2008	"Witness to Your Love"	Give Listen Help: Volume 5
2011	"Who's Gonna Ride Your Wild Horses"	(Ăhk-to͝ong Ba͞y-bi) Covered
2017	"Where Do the Children Play?"	Music To Inspire: Artists UNited Against Human Trafficking
2018	"Starman"	The Howard Stern Tribute to David Bowie

=== Remixes ===
Year	Artist	Song	Notes
1999	Fun Lovin' Criminals	"Korean Bodega"	Fun Lovin' Criminals remixed "You Look So Fine" in return. Shirley Manson performs vocals on their track.

Garbage also remixed a number of their own singles, while drummer Butch Vig remixed a number of artists while Garbage were active.

=== Live tracks ===
Year	Track name	Recorded	Release
1999	"Dumb"	26 June 1998, Roskilde Festival	Version 2.0 Special Live Edition
1999	"Stupid Girl"	26 June 1998, Roskilde Festival	Version 2.0 Special Live Edition
1999	"Temptation Waits"	26 June 1998, Roskilde Festival	Version 2.0 Special Live Edition
1999	"Vow"	26 June 1998, Roskilde Festival	Version 2.0 Special Live Edition
1999	"When I Grow Up"	26 June 1998, Roskilde Festival	"When I Grow Up" (Live at Roskilde)
1999	"Special"	1 October 1998, RIMAC Arena, San Diego, California	Launch #23 (CD-ROM magazine)
1999	"Only Happy When It Rains"	26 October 1998, Philadelphia	Sonic Sessions: Volume 3 (Y100 compilation)
1999	"Stupid Girl"	12 December 1998, Los Angeles	The Best of KROQ's Almost Acoustic Christmas
2000	"I Think I'm Paranoid"	23 September 1998, Seattle	The End Sessions (KNDD compilation)
2002	"Wild Horses"	Unspecified show on Beautiful Garbage tour, 2002	"Shut Your Mouth"
2002	"Only Happy When It Rains"	Unspecified show on Beautiful Garbage tour, 2002	"Shut Your Mouth"
2003	"Special"	20 March 1999, Saturday Night Live	Saturday Night Live: 25 Years of Music (DVD compilation)
2003	"I Think I'm Paranoid"	14 May 1999, Later... with Jools Holland	Later... Louder with Jools Holland (DVD compilation)
2003	"Shut Your Mouth"	26 August 2002, The Kerrang! Awards 2002	Kerrang! The DVD (Compilation)
2005	"Cherry Lips"	Unspecified show on Beautiful Garbage tour, 2002	Bleed Like Me (Australian Tour Edition)
2005	"Only Happy When It Rains"	13 August 2005, Future, Atlanta, Georgia	Live X 10: Recently & Relived (99x compilation)
2005	"Only Happy When It Rains"	14 May 1999, Later... with Jools Holland	Later With Jools Holland - Even Louder (DVD compilation)
2005	"Only Happy When It Rains"	8 September 2005, Ex'pression College for Digital Arts, Emeryville	Stripped Down/Unplugged: Volume III (KCNL compilation)
2006	"Special"	9 May 2002, Riviera Theatre for XRT Sunday Night Concert, Chicago, IL	ONXRT: Live From the Archives Vol 9 (WXRT compilation)
2013	"I Think I'm Paranoid"	7 August 2012, XRT Studios	ONXRT: Live From The Archives Vol. 14 (WXRT compilation)
2016	"Queer"	4 April 2005, Cologne Palladium, for Rockpalast	Livesongs Der Besten Bands Des Festivalsommers 2016 (Musikexpress compilation)
2017	"Milk"	5 October 2015, Madison, WI Orpheum Theater	This Is the Noise That Keeps Me Awake 12"
2017	"You Look So Fine"	9 October 2012, Houston, TX House of Blues	This Is the Noise That Keeps Me Awake 12"
2017	"Cup of Coffee"	25 November 2012, Brussels Ancienne Belgique	This Is the Noise That Keeps Me Awake 12"
2017	"Bleed Like Me"	6 September 2016, Houston Revention Center	This Is the Noise That Keeps Me Awake 12"
2017	"Beloved Freak"	6 September 2016, Houston Revention Center	This Is the Noise That Keeps Me Awake 12"
2017	"Even Though Our Love is Doomed"	6 September 2016, Houston Revention Center	This Is the Noise That Keeps Me Awake 12"
2017	"Only Happy When It Rains"	1996, 107.7 acoustic session	The Glamour and The Squalor soundtrack

== Videography ==
=== Video albums ===
List of video albums, with selected chart positions
Title	Details	Peak chart positions	
Title	Details	US	UK
Garbage Video	Released: November 26, 1996; Label: Almo; Formats: VHS, VCD	10	12
Absolute Garbage	Released: July 23, 2007; Label: Almo, Geffen, UM^{e}; Format: DVD	5	—
One Mile High... Live	Released: May 27, 2013; Label: Eagle Rock; Formats: DVD, Blu-ray	6	11
"—" denotes a recording that did not chart or was not released in that territory.

=== Music videos ===
List of music videos, showing year released and directors
Title	Year	Director
"Vow"	1995	Samuel Bayer
"Queer"	1995	Stéphane Sednaoui
"Only Happy When It Rains"	1996	Samuel Bayer
"Stupid Girl" (Official & Todd Terry mix version)	1996	Samuel Bayer
"Sleep"	1996	Karen Lamond
"Milk" (Official & Tricky mix version)	1996	Stéphane Sednaoui
"Push It"	1998	Andrea Giacobbe
"I Think I'm Paranoid"	1998	Matthew Rolston
"Special"	1998	Dawn Shadforth
"When I Grow Up" (live version)	1998	Sophie Muller
"The Trick Is to Keep Breathing"	1998	Sophie Muller
"You Look So Fine"	1999	Stéphane Sednaoui
"When I Grow Up" (Big Daddy version)	1999	Sophie Muller
"The World Is Not Enough"	1999	Philipp Stölzl
"Androgyny"	2001	Don Cameron
"Cherry Lips"	2001	Joseph Kahn
"Breaking Up the Girl"	2002	Francis Lawrence
"Shut Your Mouth" (animated version)	2002	Henry Moore Selder
"Shut Your Mouth" (live version)	2002	Elliot Chaffer
"Why Do You Love Me"	2005	Sophie Muller
"Bleed Like Me"	2005	Sophie Muller
"Sex Is Not the Enemy"	2005	Sophie Muller
"Run Baby Run"	2005	Sophie Muller
"Tell Me Where It Hurts"	2007	Sophie Muller
"Blood for Poppies"	2012	Matt Irwin
"Big Bright World"	2012	Julie Orser
"Because the Night" (with Screaming Females)	2013	Sophie Muller
"Girls Talk" (with Brody Dalle)	2014	Sophie Muller
"The Chemicals" (with Brian Aubert)	2015	Sophie Muller
"Empty"	2016	Samuel Bayer
"Magnetized"	2016	Scott Stuckey
"No Horses"	2017	Scott Stuckey
"The Men Who Rule the World"	2021	Javi Mi Amor
"No Gods No Masters"	2021	Scott Stuckey
"Wolves"	2021	Javi Mi Amor
"The Creeps"	2021	Javi Mi Amor
"Anonymous XXX"	2021	Javi Mi Amor
"Witness to Your Love"	2022	Bryan M. Ferguson
"Godhead"	2022	Eduardo Bernal Pérez
"Cities in Dust"	2023	Javi Mi Amor
"There's No Future in Optimism"	2025	Benjy Kirkman
