= One Mile High... Live =

Video by Garbage
- Released: May 27, 2013
- Recorded: October 6, 2012
- Venue: Ogden Theatre, Denver, Colorado
- Genre: Alternative rock, electronica
- Length: 116 mins
- Label: Eagle Vision
- Producer: Eric Haiman & Beth Klepper

Garbage chronology
Absolute Garbage (2007)	One Mile High... Live (2013)

One Mile High... Live is the 2013 live Blu-ray and DVD released by alternative rock group Garbage through Eagle Rock Entertainment. The recording took place in October 2012, at the Ogden Theatre in Denver, Colorado, and was initially broadcast live on AXS TV. The show took place approximately mid-way through the bands year-long world tour in support of their fifth album, Not Your Kind of People and features the entire group present, with bass provided by Eric Avery.

One Mile High... Live offers a career-spanning set of twenty tracks, including all of the group's seven Hot 100 hit singles, as well as a number of renditions from the band's fifth album. The discs also include behind-the-scenes footage, featurettes about songs from Not Your Kind of People, and two music videos, directed by Matt Irwin and Julie Orser respectively. The release also features a credit sequence soundtracked by a then-unreleased Garbage song titled, "Time Will Destroy Everything", which was used as the band's intro tape on the live tour.

On April 28, Eagle Rock pre-empted the release of One Mile High... Live by posting the recording of "Stupid Girl" to social media. This was followed up in successive months with the posting of footage of both "Blood for Poppies" and "Push It". A streaming video of the entire show was also posted on Eagle Rock's Facebook.

== Track listing ==
1. "Automatic Systematic Habit"
2. "I Think I'm Paranoid"
3. "Shut Your Mouth"
4. "Why Do You Love Me"
5. "Queer"
6. "Stupid Girl"
7. "Hammering In My Head"
8. "Control"
9. "#1 Crush"
10. "Cherry Lips"
11. "Big Bright World"
12. "Blood for Poppies"
13. "Special"
14. "Milk"
15. "Battle in Me"
16. "Push It"
17. "Only Happy When It Rains"
18. "Supervixen"
19. "The Trick Is to Keep Breathing"
20. "Vow"

Bonus Features:

1. "Time Will Destroy Everything" (End Credits)
2. Pre-show Warm Up
3. "Big Bright World" (Music Video)
4. "Blood for Poppies" (Music Video)

Featurettes:

1. "Automatic Systematic Habit"
2. "Battle In Me"
3. "Big Bright World"
4. "Blood For Poppies"
5. "Control"

== Personnel ==
Garbage

- Shirley Manson – lead vocals
- Duke Erikson – guitars, keyboards
- Steve Marker – guitars, keyboards
- Butch Vig – drums

Additional musician

- Eric Avery – bass guitar

== Production ==
Garbage released One Mile High...live as a live document to mark the end of their fifth world tour, and their first since reforming the year prior. The band had never released a live video in the career. The Denver show was chosen to be filmed due to considerations such as fanbase, venue size, and the fact that Garbage were headlining. Butch Vig later explained, "It's a very honest representation of what we sound like live. As a producer, I've seen a lot of bands release live DVDs and what they do is they go back in the studio and re-record everything and make it sound perfect. We did not do that. We left it very pure. It's what we sound like live. You hear little mistakes and things in the set that happen any night because it's a live environment." Vig added that the band felt that doing a show with lasers and special effects, or special guest vocalists would misrepresent the band: "It's just Garbage on stage playing our songs. That's the DVD we wanted to put out." Garbage also shot backstage documentary footage, as well as recorded audio from various shows across the tour, however this was not used on One Mile High...live.

The show was directed by Erica Ferrero, who had shot in the Ogden Theater numerous times prior; "The concert really showcased the packed venue. The challenge at the Ogden Theatre is limited camera placement and no space for a jib which we simulated with a robotic camera mounted high offstage." Guitarist Steve Marker was impressed by the discretion used by the camera team, compared to an MTV production the band had played around the same time: "You can tell that all they really care about is what’s going on with the camera. I think that they’ve tried to avoid [focusing on lighting, etc]." Garbage worked with Eagle Vision to agree on bonus content for the release; five featurettes on the writing and recording of Not Your Kind of People tracks were included. These were shot in Los Angeles by Julie Orser as buzz footage. Music videos for "Blood for Poppies" and "Big Bright World" were also included.

== Release history ==
Release formats for One Mile High... Live
Date	Territory	Label	Format(s)
May 27, 2013	United Kingdom	Eagle Vision	DVD, Blu-ray, Digital download
May 28, 2013	United States	Eagle Vision	DVD, Blu-ray, Digital download
May 31, 2013	Australia	Eagle Vision	DVD, Blu-ray, Digital download

== Charts ==
Chart (2013)	Peak position
Switzerland Music DVD chart (Schweizer Hitparade)	9
UK Music Video chart (Official Charts Company)	11
US Music Video Sales (Billboard)	6
