= Anthology (Garbage album) =

2022 greatest hits album by Garbage

Greatest hits album by Garbage
- Released: October 28, 2022
- Recorded: 1994–2021
- Studios: Smart, Madison, Wisconsin; GrungeIsDead, Silver Lake, California
- Genre: Alternative rock
- Length: 139:45
- Labels: BMG; Stunvolume

Garbage chronology
| No Gods No Masters (2021) | Anthology (2022) | Witness to Your Love (2023) |

Singles from Anthology
- 1. "The World Is Not Enough (reissue)" Released: September 13, 2022; 2. "Witness to Your Love" Released: October 28, 2022

Anthology is a greatest hits album by American rock band Garbage, released on October 28, 2022, through Stunvolume and BMG. It is the band's third overall and second international greatest hits album. The album includes remastered versions of 35 tracks, among hit singles and fan favourites, as well as rare track "Witness to Your Love", a song recorded in 2008 for inclusion in the Give Listen Help charity compilation.

== Background ==
Before the release of No Gods No Masters, Garbage partnered with BMG to distribute the album through Infectious Music. BMG has since shown interest in the band's back catalogue, reissuing the band's first two albums, Garbage and Version 2.0, on vinyl in summer 2021, releasing the 20th anniversary edition of Beautiful Garbage in November, and posting the band's music videos on Apple Music throughout 2021 and 2022. In 2022, BMG suggested the band release a greatest hits album, as it had been 15 years since 2007's Absolute Garbage. The band accepted, and on September 7, a post on the band's social media hinted at the release of Anthology, a body of work celebrating three decades of music. Shortly after the post, the album started appearing on music stores and websites, revealing the track list and the October 28 release date, before being formally announced on September 21.

Anthology is the band's third overall greatest hits album, after 2007's Absolute Garbage and 2012's The Absolute Collection. However, it is their second international greatest hits album as The Absolute Collection was only released in Australia and New Zealand ahead of their Australian 2013 tour promoting Not Your Kind of People. The album includes 35 singles listed by chronological order of release, including rare track "Witness to Your Love". The compilation omits the airplay singles "Supervixen", "Temptation Waits", the Record Store Day releases from 2013 to 2018 ("Because the Night", "Girls Talk", "The Chemicals" and "Destroying Angels") and No Gods No Masters single "Wolves". "You Look So Fine" features as "Single Version", which was only released on the CD single and on the music video in 1999. No new songs feature on the album, although all the songs were remastered in 2022 by Heba Kadry. The vinyl edition features a shorter track list of 20 songs, including "Witness to Your Love".

In 2022, singer Shirley Manson revealed Garbage had little involvement in putting Absolute Garbage together, a process she described as a "heartless experience", whereas with Anthology, the band had "the polar opposite of that experience", also being heavily involved in the art direction. Manson explained to NME that the album is not meant as a greatest hits collection, but rather something "more academic", as an opportunity to “put all our babies together as one, look at the nursery and go, ‘Wow, we raised some pretty cute kids!’” She added it's a celebration of three decades of work in the face of criticism and doubts surrounding the band's work: “that just feels like an enormous fuck you to everyone. Fuck you, whether you liked it or not. Fuck you, we’re good at what we do. Fuck you, look at that extraordinary culmination of three decades of work together.”

Album cover was realized by Chilean artist and director Javi Mi Amor, who also directed four of Garbage's music videos from No Gods No Masters. Manson explain the band decided to continue their creative partnership with Javi Mi Amor, saying: "she shares a certain kind of visual language that we really enjoy and that we feel really speaks to our kind of aesthetic." On the cover, the Japanese writing 世界中で知う九ているバンドが生んだ最高傑作 (Sekaijū de chiu kyūte iru bando ga unda saikō kessaku) translates to "A masterpiece produced by a band known all over the world".

== Release and promotion ==
On September 7, Garbage posted a picture on their social media with artwork designed by Javi Mi Amor and a caption alluding to the imminent release of a greatest hits collection celebrating three decades of career. The same day, the pre-order of Anthology started appearing on music stores online in a double LP transparent yellow vinyl edition and a double CD digipack edition. On September 13, the pre-order of the double CD and the double LP transparent yellow vinyl appeared on the band's official website, where the vinyl was bundled with exclusive postcards. The album was formally announced on September 21 on social media, through the band's mailing list and on music websites.

The album is currently unavailable in North America. When asked why, Manson explained the band was not at liberty to discuss what the problem is but conceded "bands are just at the mercy of those who own their rights." The band later took to their socials to clarify that Anthology will be both physically and digitally unavailable in North America because "the people that currently own the rights to our songs in North America decided that they didn’t care to release it. Despite our pleas to the contrary there was absolutely nothing we were able to do about that decision."

The compilation was announced to come out on major streaming platforms as well, although the digital release did not materialize until November 11. The band clarified with a statement on their social media that the delay was due to "rights issues and other unexpected complications". However, this digital edition did not feature the correct masters of the tracks. The digital release was ultimately corrected on November 16 with the 2022 Heba Kadry remasters.

On September 13, Garbage's James Bond theme song "The World Is Not Enough" was released as digital single on YouTube Music featuring new artwork. The single appeared on Amazon Music and Apple Music on September 22 and on Spotify the following day. This marks the reappearance of the song on streaming platforms, since it had disappeared in 2021 when the compilation Absolute Garbage was removed from streaming platforms in territories where the band is distributed by BMG. The single was released in Australia and New Zealand a week later by Liberator Music.

On October 4, Garbage performed "The World Is Not Enough" at the Royal Albert Hall in London with the Royal Philharmonic Orchestra as part of The Sound of 007: Live at the Royal Albert Hall curated by composer David Arnold, marking the 60th anniversary of the Bond franchise. The event was made available for streaming on Prime Video on October 5. A documentary by Matt Whitecross titled The Sound of 007 featuring an interview with Garbage premiered on Prime Video the same day.

On October 21, 2022, a "vampiric" music video for "Witness to Your Love" directed by Scottish filmmaker Bryan M. Ferguson was teased. The video premiered on October 28, the day of Anthology release.

On October 22, Garbage played at Audacy's 9th annual We Can Survive at the Hollywood Bowl in Los Angeles, their last show of the year. After the concert, Garbage went back to studio to continue writing for their eighth studio album.

== Critical reception ==
Professional ratings
Review scores
| Source | Rating |
|---|---|
| Clash | 9/10 |
| Classic Rock | 4.5/5 stars |
| Der Vinylist | 3.5/5 stars |
| Monkeypress | 8/10 |

Emma Harrison of Clash rated the album 9/10, writing "this collection of songs serves as a fantastic reminder of Garbage’s strengths of candid and perceptive storytelling." Mark Beaumont gave the album 4.5 out of 5 stars in his review for Classic Rock, highlighting the strength of Garbage's first singles as well as their latest ones: "Garbage’s melodic panache never falters, and Manson's snaking attacks on cheating husbands, oppressive regimes and capitalist patriarchies never lose their bite". German publication Der Vinylist gave the transparent yellow double vinyl edition of the album 3.5 out of 5 stars, complimenting the track selection, the look of the vinyls and the artwork. Alf Urbschat of Monkeypress, another German publication, gave the album 8/10, praising the diversity of the tracks, the freshness of the sound and the band's skills as musicians.

== Commercial performance ==
Anthology placed at number 31 on the midweek's UK Albums Chart before landing at number 99 by the end of the week, the lowest position registered by a Garbage album in the UK. However, releasing only physically, it fared better on the Albums Sales Chart (peaking at number 17), on the Vinyl Albums Chart (peaking at number 18), on the Physical Albums Chart (peaking at number 16) and on the Record Store Chart (peaking at number 12).

== Track listing ==
All tracks are written by Garbage, except where noted.

Anthology CD 1 track listing
| No. | Title | Album | Length |
|---|---|---|---|
| 1. | "Vow" | Garbage (1995) | 4:30 |
| 2. | "Subhuman" | stand-alone single (1995) | 4:34 |
| 3. | "Only Happy When It Rains" | Garbage | 3:45 |
| 4. | "Queer" | Garbage | 4:37 |
| 5. | "Stupid Girl" (written by Garbage, Mick Jones, Joe Strummer, Topper Headon, Paul Simonon) | Garbage | 4:19 |
| 6. | "Milk" | Garbage | 3:54 |
| 7. | "#1 Crush" | Romeo + Juliet soundtrack (1996) | 4:40 |
| 8. | "Push It" | Version 2.0 (1998) | 4:02 |
| 9. | "I Think I'm Paranoid" | Version 2.0 | 3:38 |
| 10. | "Special" | Version 2.0 | 3:43 |
| 11. | "When I Grow Up" | Version 2.0 | 3:24 |
| 12. | "The Trick Is to Keep Breathing" | Version 2.0 | 4:12 |
| 13. | "You Look So Fine" (single edit) | Version 2.0 | 3:49 |
| 14. | "The World Is Not Enough" (lyrics by Don Black; music by David Arnold) | The World Is Not Enough soundtrack (1999) | 3:57 |
| 15. | "Androgyny" | Beautiful Garbage (2001) | 3:10 |
| 16. | "Cherry Lips (Go Baby Go!)" | Beautiful Garbage | 3:12 |
| 17. | "Breaking Up the Girl" | Beautiful Garbage | 3:33 |
| 18. | "Shut Your Mouth" | Beautiful Garbage | 3:26 |

Anthology CD 2 track listing
| No. | Title | Album | Length |
|---|---|---|---|
| 1. | "Why Do You Love Me" | Bleed Like Me (2004) | 3:52 |
| 2. | "Bleed Like Me" | Bleed Like Me | 4:00 |
| 3. | "Sex Is Not the Enemy" | Bleed Like Me | 3:06 |
| 4. | "Run Baby Run" | Bleed Like Me | 3:57 |
| 5. | "Tell Me Where It Hurts" | Absolute Garbage (2007) | 4:11 |
| 6. | "Witness to Your Love" | Give Listen Help: Volume 5 compilation (2008) | 3:39 |
| 7. | "Blood for Poppies" | Not Your Kind of People (2012) | 3:39 |
| 8. | "Battle in Me" | Not Your Kind of People | 4:15 |
| 9. | "Automatic Systematic Habit" | Not Your Kind of People | 3:18 |
| 10. | "Big Bright World" | Not Your Kind of People | 3:35 |
| 11. | "Control" | Not Your Kind of People | 4:12 |
| 12. | "Empty" | Strange Little Birds (2016) | 3:54 |
| 13. | "Magnetized" | Strange Little Birds | 3:54 |
| 14. | "Even Though Our Love Is Doomed" | Strange Little Birds | 5:26 |
| 15. | "No Horses" | stand-alone single (2017) | 5:23 |
| 16. | "The Men Who Rule the World" | No Gods No Masters (2021) | 4:29 |
| 17. | "No Gods No Masters" | No Gods No Masters | 4:31 |

Anthology 2LP yellow vinyl track listing
| No. | Title | Album | Length |
|---|---|---|---|
| 1. | "Only Happy When It Rains" | Garbage (1995) | 3:46 |
| 2. | "Queer" | Garbage | 4:38 |
| 3. | "Stupid Girl" | Garbage | 4:19 |
| 4. | "#1 Crush" | Romeo + Juliet soundtrack (1996) | 4:41 |
| 5. | "Push It" | Version 2.0 (1998) | 4:03 |
| 6. | "I Think I'm Paranoid" | Version 2.0 | 3:38 |
| 7. | "Special" | Version 2.0 | 3:44 |
| 8. | "The World Is Not Enough" | The World Is Not Enough soundtrack (1999) | 3:58 |
| 9. | "Androgyny" | Beautiful Garbage (2001) | 3:10 |
| 10. | "Cherry Lips (Go Baby Go!)" | Beautiful Garbage | 3:10 |
| 11. | "Why Do You Love Me" | Bleed Like Me (2004) | 3:52 |
| 12. | "Bleed Like Me" | Bleed Like Me | 4:01 |
| 13. | "Witness to Your Love" | Give Listen Help: Volume 5 compilation (2008) | 3:40 |
| 14. | "Blood for Poppies" | Not Your Kind of People (2012) | 3:39 |
| 15. | "Automatic Systematic Habit" | Not Your Kind of People | 3:19 |
| 16. | "Empty" | Strange Little Birds (2016) | 3:19 |
| 17. | "Even Though Our Love Is Doomed" | Strange Little Birds | 5:27 |
| 18. | "No Horses" | stand-alone single (2017) | 5:24 |
| 19. | "The Men Who Rule the World" | No Gods No Masters (2021) | 4:30 |
| 20. | "No Gods No Masters" | No Gods No Masters | 4:32 |

== Charts ==
Chart performance for Anthology
| Chart (2022) | Peak position |
|---|---|
| Australian Physical Albums (ARIA) | 24 |
| Belgian Albums (Ultratop Flanders) | 110 |
| Belgian Albums (Ultratop Wallonia) | 45 |
| German Albums (Offizielle Top 100) | 54 |
| Scottish Albums (Official Charts) | 15 |
| Spanish Albums (Promusicae) | 49 |
| UK Albums (Official Charts) | 99 |
| UK Independent Albums (Official Charts) | 8 |

== Release history ==
Release formats for Anthology
| Region | Date | Label | Distributor | Format(s) |
|---|---|---|---|---|
| United Kingdom, Europe and Japan | October 28, 2022 | Stunvolume; BMG | Infectious Music; BMG | Transparent yellow LP; 2×CD |
| Australia and New Zealand | October 28, 2022 | Stunvolume; BMG | Liberator Music | Transparent yellow LP; 2×CD |
| United Kingdom, Europe and Japan | November 11, 2022 | Stunvolume; BMG | Infectious Music; BMG | Digital |
| Australia and New Zealand | November 11, 2022 | Stunvolume; BMG | Liberator Music | Digital |
