= Victoria Fu =

American visual artist

- Born: Santa Monica, California, US
- Education: Stanford University (BA); USC (MA); Cal Arts (MFA)
- Known for: Film, video, installation art
- Notable work: Belle Captive I (2013); Lorem ipsum I (2013)
- Movement: Conceptual art
- Website: victoriafu.com

Victoria Fu is an American visual artist who is working in the field of digital video and analog film, and the interplay of photographic, screen based, and projected images.

== Education ==
Fu received her MFA from the California Institute of the Arts (CalArts), MA (Phi Kappa Phi) in art history from the University of Southern California, and BA (with distinction) in art from Stanford University. Fu attended the Skowhegan School of Painting and Sculpture and the Whitney Independent Study Program.

== Career ==
Fu is co-founder of ARTOFFICE.org (with Julie Orser), an organization established in 2006 dedicated to artists's film and video. She is currently an Associate Professor of the Visual Arts and Co-Director of Film Studies at the University of San Diego. Her work has been described as questioning the "cultural and psychological spaces of viewership that define the cinematic." In Artillery, Seth Hawkins writes her "work transitions seamlessly from photo to film." She is a 2015 Film and Video Fellow of the John Simon Guggenheim Memorial Foundation.

== Work ==
Belle Captive I, (2013) is a video installation that uses appropriated stock footage that is transferred from 16 mm film to digital video. The piece was presented in the lobby gallery of the 2014 Whitney Biennial.

Lorem ipsum I, (2013) "is a flow of fragmentary images [that] flirts with and recoil[s] from a fully integrated, intact portrait." This digital video screened at the "Projections" program at the New York Film Festival in 2014.

In 2014, her sculptural and video based abstract work was part of the Whitney Biennial exhibition in its lobby gallery.

The Contemporary Museum in Baltimore had a 2015 solo exhibit of Fu's work, Bubble Over Green.

The Simon Preston Gallery in New York hosted their second exhibit of Fu's work in 2017.

In 2022, Fu collaborated with choreography Milka Djordjevich and fellow visual artist Matt Richto put on an original show at the Getty Center. Fu's work was also part of the Los Angeles County Museum of Art 2022 exhibit, "Objects of Desire: Photography and the Language of Advertising." Fu's work is included in the collection of the Pérez Art Museum Miami, Florida.
