= Because the Night =

Song written by Bruce Springsteen and Patti Smith

- U.S. and some European releases picture sleeve

Single by Patti Smith Group

from the album Easter
- B-side: "God Speed"
- Released: March 2, 1978
- Recorded: August 1977
- Studio: Record Plant, New York City, U.S.
- Genre: New wave
- Length: 3:22
- Label: Arista
- Songwriters: Bruce Springsteen, Patti Smith
- Producer: Jimmy Iovine

Patti Smith singles chronology
"Ask the Angels" (1977)	"Because the Night" (1978)	"Privilege (Set Me Free)" (1978)

Audio
- "Because the Night" by Patti Smith on YouTube

"Because the Night" is a song from 1977 written by Bruce Springsteen and Patti Smith which appears on the 1978 Patti Smith Group album Easter. On March 2, 1978, the song was released as a single, and was commercially successful, reaching No. 13 on the Billboard Hot 100 chart and No. 5 in the United Kingdom, which helped propel Easter to mainstream success.

The song has been recorded by several singers. In 1993, a live acoustic version was recorded by 10,000 Maniacs for MTV Unplugged. This version reached No. 11 on the Billboard Hot 100, making it the highest charting version of the song in the U.S. The song also became 10,000 Maniacs' highest charting single in the U.S. and Canada.

In 1987, the song was ranked No. 116 on NME magazine's list of "The Top 150 Singles of All Time". It remains the best-known song of Smith's catalog. In 2021, Rolling Stone ranked it No. 358 on "Top 500 Greatest Songs of All Time". The Independent listed the song as one of the ten best new wave singles of 1978.

== History ==
Bruce Springsteen and the E Street Band recorded "Because the Night" at Atlantic Studios in New York City on June 1, 1977, the first day of recording sessions for Darkness on the Edge of Town, though the lyrics only consisted of the song title and some mumbling. Springsteen struggled with the song for almost four months. Smith recorded the song two months after Springsteen's original version was recorded.

Springsteen later said he was not satisfied with the song, and he already knew he was not going to finish it since it was "a[nother] love song". Jimmy Iovine, who was engineering Springsteen's album, was also producing the album Easter for Patti Smith at the Record Plant in New York City, where Darkness was being recorded. He brought Smith the last recording by Springsteen, from September 27, 1977. Smith added her own lyrics, recorded it, and scored her biggest hit single.

The song was first performed live at a Patti Smith concert at CBGB in New York City on December 30, 1977 (Smith's 31st birthday), with Springsteen joining on vocals and guitar. Though it was never released on any of Springsteen's studio albums, in concert beginning with his Darkness Tour Springsteen performed the song with his own lyrics.

The only two commercially released recordings of a Springsteen version of the song were in the 1986 box set Live/1975–85, in which Smith is listed as co-writer; and the 2010 compilation album The Promise (using the original recording from the Darkness on the Edge of Town sessions with Smith's lyrics).

A performance of the Bruce Springsteen was done with Michael Stipe of REM fame in 2004

In September 2023, the song was featured in the trailer for Season 2 of HBO Max's Our Flag Means Death.

== Charts ==
=== Weekly charts ===
Chart (1978)	Peak position
Australia (Kent Music Report)	15
Austria (Ö3 Austria Top 40)	21
Canada Top Singles (RPM)	13
Ireland (IRMA)	16
Sweden (Sverigetopplistan)	9
UK Singles (OCC)	5
US Billboard Hot 100	13
US Cash Box Top 100	10
US Record World Singles Chart	17

=== Year-end charts ===
Chart (1978)	Rank
Australia (Kent Music Report)	91
Canada Top Singles (RPM)	98
US Billboard Hot 100	72
US Cash Box Top 100	95

== Certifications ==
Region	Certification	Certified units/sales
Italy (FIMI)	Platinum	100,000^{‡}
Spain (Promusicae)	Gold	30,000^{‡}
United Kingdom (BPI)	Gold	400,000^{‡}
^{‡} Sales+streaming figures based on certification alone.

== CO.RO version ==
"Because the Night"
- Artwork for German releases; the Canadian CD single uses the similar artwork but uses different colors and font

Single by Co.Ro featuring Taleesa

from the album The Album
- B-side: "It's a Love"
- Released: 1992
- Genre: Synth-pop; Eurodance
- Length: 4:32
- Label: ZYX
- Songwriters: Bruce Springsteen; Patti Smith; Martin Gore

Co.Ro singles chronology
"Because the Night" (1992)	"There's Something Going On" (1993)

In 1992, Italian dance act CO.RO released a version that sold over 660,000 copies. It also samples the Depeche Mode song "Master and Servant" and was a hit in Europe, becoming gold record in France and reaching number-one in Spain. Additionally the single peaked within the top 10 in Belgium, France, Greece and Italy. On the Eurochart Hot 100, "Because the Night" reached number 15 in February 1993. It was also successful in Brazil, and became a big opening of a Eurodance explosion in the 1990s.

=== Critical reception ===
The song received favorable reviews from music critics. Larry Flick from Billboard magazine wrote that it "gets a rave/pop treatment" and "urgent vocals by Tarlisa swerve around a looped sample from Depeche Mode's 'Master & Servant'." He stated that it "ultimately works well and is better than many of the other covers". Alan Jones from Music Week gave it three out of five. He complimented the song as "actually quite endearing", adding that it combines DM samples with "a maverick bassline and a Smith soundalike. It could click."

=== Track listing ===
CD single – Europe (1992)

1. "Because the Night" (T.L.S. Radio Mix) – 4:32
2. "Because the Night" (T.L.S. Mix) – 5:20
3. "It's a Love" (T.S.F. Mix) – 3:40
4. "Because the Night" (Dub Mix) – 5:20

=== Charts ===
==== Weekly charts ====
Chart (1992–1993)	Peak position
Austria (Ö3 Austria Top 40)	14
Belgium (Ultratop 50 Flanders)	7
Belgium (VRT Top 30 Flanders)	8
Europe (Eurochart Hot 100)	15
Europe (European Dance Radio)	15
France (SNEP)	6
Germany (GfK)	16
Greece (Pop + Rock)	8
Ireland (IRMA)	21
Israel (Israeli Singles Chart)	21
Italy (Musica e dischi)	7
Netherlands (Dutch Top 40)	19
Netherlands (Single Top 100)	17
Spain (AFYVE)	1
Sweden (Sverigetopplistan)	26
UK Singles (OCC)	61
UK Dance (Music Week)	19

==== Year-end charts ====
Chart (1993)	Position
Belgium (Ultratop)	87
Europe (Eurochart Hot 100)	52
Germany (Media Control)	35

== 10,000 Maniacs version ==
"Because the Night"

Single by 10,000 Maniacs

from the album MTV Unplugged
- B-side: "Stockton Gala Days" (live)
- Released: October 11, 1993
- Recorded: 1993
- Studio: Sony Music (New York City)
- Length: 3:44
- Label: Elektra, MTV Networks
- Songwriters: Bruce Springsteen, Patti Smith
- Producer: Paul Fox

10,000 Maniacs singles chronology
"Everyday Is Like Sunday" (1993)	"Because the Night" (1993)	"More Than This" (1997)

An acoustic version was recorded by 10,000 Maniacs in 1993 for MTV Unplugged, with a few lyrical alterations. The recording gained considerable radio airplay and reached No. 11 on the Billboard Hot 100. The cover reached the top 10 in Canada and Iceland, reaching No. 10 and No. 7, respectively. A live version with lead vocalist Mary Ramsey was also included on their 2016 album Playing Favorites.

=== Track listing ===
CD single – US (1993)

1. "Because the Night" (live version) – 3:28
2. "Stockton Gala Days" (live version) – 5:25

=== Charts ===
==== Weekly charts ====
Chart (1993–1994)	Peak position
Canada Top Singles (RPM)	10
Iceland (Íslenski Listinn Topp 40)	7
UK Singles (Official Charts)	65
US Billboard Hot 100	11
US Adult Contemporary (Billboard)	9
US Modern Rock Tracks (Billboard)	7
US Top 40/Mainstream (Billboard)	7

==== Year-end charts ====
Chart (1994)	Rank
Brazil (Mais Tocadas)	45
Canada Top Singles (RPM)	86
Iceland (Íslenski Listinn Topp 40)	15
US Billboard Hot 100	40

== Cascada version ==
"Because the Night"

Single by Cascada

from the album Perfect Day
- Released: July 18, 2008
- Genre: Eurodance
- Length: 3:25
- Label: Zooland
- Songwriters: Bruce Springsteen; Patti Smith
- Producers: Yann Pfeiffer; DJ Manian

Cascada singles chronology
"What Do You Want from Me?" (2008)	"Because the Night" (2008)	"Faded" (2008)

Music video
- "Because the Night" on YouTube

In 2008, Cascada recorded a version which appears on their second album Perfect Day. The music video for the single premiered on YouTube on May 28, 2008. The single was released on July 18, 2008, in Germany.

=== Track listing ===
CD single – Germany (2008)

1. "Because the Night" – 3:26
2. "Because the Night" (Original Mix) – 5:32
3. "Because the Night" (Mondo Remix) – 5:58
4. "Because the Night" (2-4 Grooves remix) – 5:45
5. "Because the Night" (The Hitmen remix) – 5:49
6. "Because the Night" (Manian Bootleg Cut) – 5:04
7. "Because the Night" (Manox remix) – 6:19

CD single - UK (2008)

1. "Because the Night" – 3:26
2. "Because the Night" (Original Mix) – 5:32
3. "Because the Night" (Styles & Breeze Remix) – 6:15
4. "Because the Night" (Riffs & Rays Remix) – 6:27
5. "Because the Night" (Hypasonic Remix) – 5:34
6. "Because the Night" (Hitmen Remix) – 5:49
7. "Because the Night" (Manox remix) – 6:19

=== Chart performance ===
Chart (2008)	Peak position
Austria (Ö3 Austria Top 40)	45
Czech Republic Airplay (ČNS IFPI)	90
European Hot 100 Singles (Billboard)	53
Germany (GfK)	41
Scottish Singles Sales (Official Charts)	5
Slovakia Airplay (ČNS IFPI)	56
UK Singles (Official Charts)	28

=== Release history ===
Region	Release date	Record label
Germany	July 18, 2008	Zooland
United Kingdom	July 28, 2008	Zooland

== Garbage and Screaming Females version ==
"Because the Night"

Single by Garbage and Screaming Females
- B-side: "Love Like Suicide"
- Released: April 20, 2013
- Recorded: 2013
- Studio: EastWest Studio 1, Los Angeles
- Genre: Alternative rock, post-grunge
- Length: 4:55
- Label: Stunvolume
- Songwriters: Bruce Springsteen, Patti Smith
- Producers: Garbage and Screaming Females

Garbage singles chronology
"Automatic Systematic Habit" (2012)	"Because the Night" (2013)	"Girls Talk" (2014)

Music video
- "Because the Night" on YouTube

In early 2013, Garbage and Screaming Females recorded a cover of "Because the Night" for an exclusive vinyl release on that year's Record Store Day; an annual celebration of independent record stores. Garbage had released two singles ("Blood for Poppies" and "Battle in Me") to mark the 2012 event, and were keen to release "something special" for the following year. The band decided to record "Because the Night" with Screaming Females following some well-received duets of the track at live dates during their North American tour. Marissa Paternoster of Screaming Females originally suggested covering "Because the Night" live. "We thought it'd be the perfect opportunity to solidify a recording and do something really special for the fans and for all the independent record stores," Garbage frontwoman Shirley Manson told Billboard.

Screaming Females flew from their base in New Jersey to Los Angeles to record the track with Garbage, who had set up two complete sets of instruments in EastWest Studios for the session. Garbage drummer Butch Vig told NME: "We did it old-school style. They came out to Hollywood and we went into a big tracking room and recorded Phil Spector style... We cut it live and did very few overdubs, did everything in a day and it came out pretty great. Marissa plays, I think, a 48-bar guitar solo at the end, that girl can shred like Eddie Van Halen, no kidding."

Garbage used social media to raise awareness of the release, and to Record Store Day in general. The band shot a video where they professed their love for independent stores, and stated their earliest memories of shopping in them, while Manson wrote a statement about the importance of the continued existence of these stores, and of vinyl records: "In a world like ours, where we live increasingly isolated lives behind the lonely glow of our computer screens, Record Store Day reminds us all that an independent record store is worth protecting and fighting for. They are a haven and a harbour for all curious and wandering souls." Manson also tipped her hat to Patti Smith in the run-up to RSD 2013: "She is absolutely, without a doubt, one of my greatest inspirations. When I think I can't do things, I think about her and what she's achieved and what she continues to achieve on her own terms—always. That really inspires me. I don't know if she's aware of the cover we're releasing, or if she's aware that I covered "Kimberly" with Angelfish."

"Because the Night" was pressed to a "Coke bottle-green" 10-inch vinyl and backed with "Love Like Suicide" and a fan remix of the album's opening track "Automatic Systematic Habit". An original Garbage song, "Love Like Suicide" had been previously released as a bonus track exclusive to the Japan pressing of Not Your Kind of People. Manson explained the song's inclusion to MySpace: "We're releasing it now because we wanted to give a nice gift for the fans." The remix of "Automatic..." was produced by Garbage fan Konstantin Khazev and won first prize in an amateur remix competition held through the Beatport website in 2012. The RSD package was limited to 5,000 units, with the sleeve artwork created by Marissa Paternoster.

The release of "Because the Night" in the United Kingdom was delayed due to problems with the record's distributor. The band made a statement via social media the evening before Record Store Day: "We are so pissed off and disappointed about this. And so sad that on Record Store Day in the UK our little jewel will not be available for sale." The UK release of "Because the Night" was rescheduled to May 13, 2013. The single debuted at number 100 on the Physical Singles chart, before shooting up to number 4 the following week.

On May 7, 2013, Garbage issued a digital single of "Because the Night" in the United States, which was followed a week later by an international digital release.

"Because the Night" was later included on the deluxe edition bonus disc of Garbage's seventh album, No Gods No Masters and Screaming Females' compilation album Singles Too.

=== Music video ===
While Garbage and Screaming Females recorded at EastWest Studios, Sophie Muller shot black and white footage to document the sessions. On March 4, 2013, a teaser video was released to YouTube featuring clips of the band members. The full music video was subsequently released on April 17; ahead of Record Store Day.

=== Critical reception ===
The cover version of "Because the Night" was positively received by contemporary music critics in advance of Record Store Day. Billboard magazine's Hilary Hughes stated, "...the Garbage/Screaming Females release embodies the shifts brought on by Record Store Day that impact the music industry across the board-and the shaping trends that have fueled Record Store Day's meteoric rise from a community experiment to an international movement," referencing the pairing of artists and the independent label of release. Chris Martins of Spin wrote, "...the bands gel awesomely. The highlight comes when Paternoster starts to shred. We have a feeling Miss Smith will be proud."

=== Track listing ===
- 10-inch Record Store Day release (STNVOL-007)
1. "Because the Night" – 4:55
2. "Automatic Systematic Habit" (Costa Cadeu remix) – 4:38
3. "Love Like Suicide" – 3:51
- Digital single
1. "Because the Night" – 4:55

=== Charts ===
Chart performance for "Because the Night"
Chart (2013)	Peak position
UK Physical Singles (Official Charts Company)	4
US Hot Single Sales (Billboard)	23

=== Release history ===
Release history and formats for "Because the Night"
Region	Release date	Record label	Format
United States	April 20, 2013	Stunvolume	10-inch vinyl (Record Store Day release)
United States	May 7, 2013	Stunvolume	Digital single
United Kingdom	May 13, 2013	Stunvolume	10-inch vinyl
Various	May 13, 2013	Stunvolume	Digital single

== Other cover versions ==
- Italian singer Anna Oxa recorded an Italian language version of the song with the title "Notti per due", released in 1979.
- Glam metal band Keel recorded the song in 1986 on their sophomore album, The Final Frontier.
- British singer Kim Wilde recorded the song with the Royal Philharmonic Orchestra as part of the 1998 album Philharmania, produced and conducted by Mike Batt.
- A Spanish cover version of the song appeared on the 2000 album El tiempo de la luz by the band Tahúres Zurdos. Its leader and vocalist, Aurora Beltrán, would participate in 2024 with this cover in Nat Simons' Felinas project.
- German DJ Jan Wayne released a dance version in 2002 that reached number 22 on the Irish Singles Chart, number 14 on the UK Singles Chart, number 2 in Belgium and number one on the Dutch Single Top 100.
- In 2010, Springsteen performed the song on Late Night with Jimmy Fallon, accompanied by bandmates Steven Van Zandt, Roy Bittan and the Roots.
- A cover by synthwave band The Midnight, featuring Nikki Flores, is included as the last track of the band's EP Horror Show, released on 2021.
- A cover by the band the Protomen is included as the second track of their covers album The Cover Up (Original Motion Picture Soundtrack) album, released on 2015
- The British band Suede covered the song during their Radio 2 Piano Room session with the BBC Concert Orchestra on February 21st, 2023.
