= Tell Me Where It Hurts (Garbage song) =

Single by Garbage

from the album Absolute Garbage
- B-side: "Betcha"; "All the Good in This Life"
- Released: July 16, 2007
- Recorded: March 2007
- Studio: Kung Foo Sound & GrungeIsDead, Los Angeles
- Length: 4:10
- Label: A&E Records
- Songwriter: Garbage
- Producer: Garbage

Garbage singles chronology
"Run Baby Run" (2005)	"Tell Me Where It Hurts" (2007)	"Blood for Poppies" (2012)

"Tell Me Where It Hurts" is the 2007 lead single from alternative rock band Garbage's greatest hits album Absolute Garbage. It was released as a physical single by A&E Records in the United Kingdom and Ireland, and as a digital single or airplay-only release in other territories internationally.

"Tell Me Where It Hurts" was written by Garbage members Shirley Manson, Duke Erikson, Steve Marker and Butch Vig in March 2007 for inclusion on Absolute Garbage. The song was written around a string arrangement by the band. Manson had come up with the title a few years prior.

== Song ==
Garbage began work on "Tell Me Where It Hurts" in earnest during February and March 2007 at Vig's home studio in Los Angeles, ending their self-imposed hiatus to record new tracks following the band's appearance at a benefit show in Glendale, California for musician Wally Ingram who had been suffering from throat cancer. In an interview prior to that event, drummer Vig told Billboard "Despite the layoff, the group has been sharing song ideas via the Internet. We need to sit down in a room and play them and get them complete".

The genesis of "Tell Me Where It Hurts" came from Garbage jamming in a Bacharach-style, which took shape in the recording studio once guitars were added. Manson did not want the song to be a "simple, lovey-dovey love song, it had to have strange connotations".

During the sessions to write new songs for Absolute Garbage, Garbage worked on four songs - "Tell Me Where It Hurts", "Betcha", "All The Good In This Life" and "Girls Talk Shit". Of the four songs, only "Tell Me Where It Hurts" made the album, while of the other three songs, one ended up a b-side, one an iTunes bonus and one remaining unreleased until it was rearrranged in 2014, respectively. Garbage completed two versions of "Tell Me Where It Hurts": an orchestral version and a "Guitars Up" mix with a rockier arrangement.

Bass on "Tell Me Where It Hurts" was performed by Daniel Shulman, who had been Garbage's touring bassist from 1995 until 2002, as well as performing on tracks from both Version 2.0 and Beautiful Garbage. This was his first appearance on a Garbage track since taking up an A&R position with Island Def Jam Music Group in 2003.

== Single release ==
On May 22, 2007, "Tell Me Where It Hurts" was confirmed by Garbage for UK release on July 9 preceding Absolute Garbage on CD single and on two 7" formats. By June 11, that release date had been pushed back a week to July 16 and one of the 7" formats was cancelled and replaced with a DVD single. On May 31, Garbage's MySpace profile was updated to include "Tell Me Where It Hurts" and its b-side, a remix of "Bad Boyfriend" on streaming audio.

Promotional singles featuring radio edits of both versions of the track were issued to radio stations across the UK, Ireland, Europe, Israel and Australia at the end of May. By June 16, "Tell Me Where It Hurts" had been playlisted on XFM Scotland's Upfront, Radio Forth and C-Listed on UK BBC Radio 2 where it remained for five weeks prior to the single release date. In its first week at Australian radio, "Tell Me Where It Hurts" was #2 most added song. On September 14, "Tell Me Where It Hurts" peaked at #1 on Turkey's Radyo ODTÜ chart where it stayed for two weeks.

Despite debuting on the UK Physical Singles Chart on July 29 at #15, combined sales of physical formats and digital downloads meant that "Tell Me Where It Hurts" charted at #50 on the main UK Singles Chart. The following week "Tell Me Where it Hurts" fell to #137. On August 16, the full length orchestral version of the song, titled "Un Belle du Jour mix", was released digitally on iTunes UK store.

In North America, "Tell Me Where It Hurts" was not officially sent to radio; however, Triple A station WXPK in White Plains and alternative rock stations KNRK in Portland and WEQX in Albany "added" the song to their station playlists from May 29.

== B-sides ==
"Bad Boyfriend" was originally written by Garbage, and produced by Garbage and John King in 2004 for the Bleed Like Me album. Vig "goofed around" with the track in 2006 while updating his home studio, and while putting the Absolute Garbage package together thought it could be included. Rather than soliciting an outside producer to remix the song Vig finished it himself. When he presented it to the rest of Garbage, they agreed the remix should be included on the album. The new version was subtitled "Sting Like a Bee remix", and was first released on the 7" of "Tell Me Where It Hurts" as well as on the two-disc edition of Absolute Garbage (as "Garbage remix").

"Betcha" was written and produced by Garbage at the same time as "Tell Me Where It Hurts" and was exclusively released on the CD single format. Press releases for "Tell Me Where It Hurts" gave the impression that "Betcha" was a cover version of the Pussycat Dolls' 2005 worldwide hit single "Don't Cha", however the song at most alluded to it in the lyrics: Thomas Callaway, Anthony Ray and Trever Smith, the writers of "Don't Cha" are not given any songwriting credit for "Betcha".

While "All The Good in This Life" was initially listed for release on the B-side to a cancelled second 7" format, it was eventually released bundled with Absolute Garbage as an exclusive online bonus track on iTunes Australian and UK stores. In 2008, "All The Good in This Life" was physically released on the charity compilation Songs for Tibet: The Art of Peace, and was included on a "Tell Me Where It Hurts" digital EP available through 7digital and iTunes Plus.

== Music video ==
The promotional video for "Tell Me Where It Hurts" was directed by Sophie Muller for Oil Factory and filmed in late April in Los Angeles. Muller suggested an homage to Luis Buñuel's 1967 movie Belle de jour in her treatment for the video, along with an ultra-modern French-inspired set, which Garbage felt was perfect for what they wanted visually accompany the song.

Shirley Manson alludes to Belle de Jour's Séverine in the "Tell Me Where It Hurts" video.

Opening with a tracking shot of Manson arriving at a high-class brothel, dressed like Catherine Deneuve in Belle de jour, where inside she meets the brothel owner, several other girls and three male patrons played by Erikson, Marker and Vig. Picking up a young man in a cafe, Manson partakes in various light sexual acts with him, shown on screen through subtle visual innuendo, suggestive camera shots, and aggressive editing. After night-vision scenes showing Manson with facial bruising, she returns to the brothel parlour in defiance of the others, attending to the young man who is now blind and uses a wheelchair. The cafe scene featured a cameo from members of Wisconsin band Wandering Sons.

On May 19, 2007, Garbage fan sites reported that the video for the song was being aired on UK digital television provider Virgin Media's Video on Demand service. On May 29, the video officially debuted on Channel 4's Video Exclusive slot. While the video featured on WEA International's worldwide DVD pressings of Absolute Garbage, it was not included on Geffen/UM^{e}'s North American DVD release. A short "Making of" documenting the filming of the video for "Tell Me Where It Hurts" was included on the DVD single. Directed by Todd Stefani (brother of Manson's friend Gwen Stefani), it features short interviews with Manson, Vig and 1st A.D. Andy Coffing.

In 2008, Sophie Muller was nominated for "Director of the Year" nominee at the 17th Annual MVPA Awards for her videos for "Tell Me Where It Hurts", Gwen Stefani's "4 in the Morning" and Maroon 5's "Won't Go Home Without You".

== Critical reception ==
"Tell Me Where It Hurts" received a positive to mixed reception from music critics. Positive responses came from Music Week who described the song as "epic", as did BBC Music's Jaime Gill while Slant described it as "lush and lilting.. an undeniable sign that, despite their extended hiatuses and internal turmoil, Garbage is very much alive with ideas and ambition". Digital Spy's Alex Fletcher wrote "the track soars with Arcade Fire-style violins before a creepy electronic breakdown interjects towards the end. [Garbage] take a traditional message of unrequited love and mix it with their inimitable bittersweet lyrics".

The Sunday Mails Avril Cadden describes Manson's vocal as "cute and sexy" while its sister publication Daily Record "sounding more like Chrissie Hynde from The Pretenders than the stupid girl we're used to" and also noting that the song had "all the hallmarks of Shirley Manson, the solo artist."Rock Sound compared the track to Scottish band Texas. Classic rocks Johnny Dee praised the band's work at breaking their formula by "adding strings to the dynamic... ["Tell Me Where It Hurts"] sits well alongside their peerless early material".

Negative criticism was received from The Guardian's Jude Rogers, who described "Tell Me Where It Hurts" as "anodyne", while The Scotsman felt that the song "is not out of place [on Absolute Garbage], but neither does it better anything already said". Pitchfork Media's Adam Moerder felt that the song "provides little hope for a Garbage rebound", while PopMatters' Evan Sawdey nonchalantly wrote "majestic and sweeping, [the song] manages to accomplish the rare compilation feat of not being completely worthless".

In advance of 2008's 50th Grammy Awards, Geffen Records submitted "Tell Me Where It Hurts" for consideration in four categories: Song of the Year, Record of the Year, Best Rock Song and Best Rock Performance by a Duo or Group. However it failed to pick up a single nomination.

== Track listings ==
- UK 7" single (A&E Records WEA424)
1. "Tell Me Where It Hurts" – 4:10
2. "Bad Boyfriend" (Sting Like a Bee remix) – 5:03
- UK CD single (A&E Records WEA424CD)
1. "Tell Me Where It Hurts" – 4:10
2. "Betcha" – 4:39
- UK DVD single (A&E Records WEA424DVD)
1. "Tell Me Where It Hurts" – 4:10
2. "Tell Me Where It Hurts" (video) – 4:13
3. "Tell Me Where It Hurts" (making-of) – 5:09
- UK digital single
1. "Tell Me Where It Hurts" (Guitars Up) – 4:11
2. "Tell Me Where It Hurts" (Un Belle de Jour mix) – 4:18
- UK digital EP
1. "Tell Me Where It Hurts" – 4:10
2. "Bad Boyfriend" (Garbage remix) – 5:03
3. "Betcha" – 4:39
4. "All the Good in This Life" – 4:20

== Credits and personnel ==
Production

- Music and lyrics: Garbage
- Recorded and produced by Garbage
- Engineer: Billy Bush
- Recorded at Kung Foo Sound and GrungeIsDead, Los Angeles, California
- Mastered: Emily Lazar & Sarah Register (The Lodge)
- Mastering assistant: Joe LaPorta

Additional musicians

- Daniel Shulman – bass guitar

Other personnel

- Art direction and design: Tom Hington Studios
- Photography by David Hughes
- Original silkscreen and foil blocking printed by Something Else.

Official versions

- "Album version / Guitars Up mix" – 4:10
- "Guitars Up - Single edit" – 3:45
- "Un Belle du Jour mix / Orchestral mix" – 4:18
- "Orchestral - Single edit" – 3:48

Publishing

- Written by Garbage _{c.}2007

Deadarm Music / Almo Music Corp (ASCAP) and Vibecrusher Music / Irving Music, Inc (BMI). Administered by Rondor Music.

Other credits

- Shirley Manson appears courtesy of Radioactive Records.

== Charts ==
Chart performance for "Tell Me Where It Hurts"
Chart (2007)	Peak position
Belgium (Wallonia) Ultratip 50 (GfK)	24
Italy (FIMI)	96
Macedonia Top 30 (IFPI)	1
Romania Top 100 (Music & Media)	80
Scotland (Official Charts Company)	16
United Kingdom (The Official Charts Company)	50

== Release history ==
Release history and formats for "Tell Me Where It Hurts"
Territory	Release date	Record label	Format
Australia	June 2007	Warner Music Australia	Airplay
United Kingdom	June 2007	A&E	Airplay
United Kingdom	July 9, 2007	A&E	Digital single ("Guitars Up mix")
Ireland	July 13, 2007	A&E	7" vinyl, CD single, DVD single
United Kingdom	July 16, 2007	A&E	7" vinyl, CD single, DVD single
United Kingdom	August 16, 2007	A&E	Digital single ("Un Belle de Jour remix")
