= Girls Talk (Garbage song) =

Single by Garbage
- B-side: "Time Will Destroy Everything"
- Released: April 19, 2014
- Recorded: 2014; California, US
- Genre: Alternative rock
- Length: 3:34
- Label: Stunvolume
- Songwriter: Garbage
- Producer: Garbage

Garbage singles chronology
| "Because the Night" (2013) | "Girls Talk" (2014) | "The Chemicals" (2015) |

Music video
- "Girls Talk" on YouTube

"Girls Talk" is a stand-alone single released by alternative rock band Garbage for Record Store Day 2014, backed with the b-side "Time Will Destroy Everything". Both tracks would be remastered and included on Garbage's seventh studio album No Gods No Masters in 2021.

== Background and recording ==
=== "Girls Talk" ===
Developed from a long gestating song idea, "Girls Talk" was originally known "Girls Talk Shit" and was written by the band for inclusion on their 2007 greatest hits set Absolute Garbage. Butch Vig described the original sessions for the song as "pretty cool sounding, lots of fast pizzicato guitars and cellos".

The track was first teased on September 28, 2011, in a short video titled "GirlMaskScooters" but wasn't released until 2014. The newly recorded take of "Girls Talk" features vocals from The Distillers singer Brody Dalle and Eric Avery on bass guitar. It was engineered and mixed by Billy Bush. Earlier in 2014, Garbage vocalist Shirley Manson also featured on Brody Dalle's single "Meet the Foetus / Oh The Joy".

=== "Time Will Destroy Everything" ===
"Time Will Destroy Everything" was first conceived during the sessions for 2012's Not Your Kind of People and used as an intro-tape on the band's accompanying world tour. Before its release as b-side of the "Girls Talk" vinyl, a portion of the song was also used in the credits of the live DVD One Mile High... Live.

Manson described it as her "soul song", being "a person who ruminates on death and destruction". Guitarist Steve Marker came up with the instrumental, which according to Manson "sounded like the future, as if from a sci-fi movie like Blade Runner or something" and inspired her to write an "anthem about how we shouldn't sweat all the stupid shit in life. It's so immaterial, so inconsequential. Your lifespan is ticking out on you as you speak. Because it's a truism that time will destroy everything, right? It's just basic logic."

== Single release ==
"Girls Talk" is the third Record Store Day release issued by Garbage, following their previous years' cover version of "Because the Night" recorded with Screaming Females, and "Blood for Poppies""/"Battle In Me" in 2012. The cover art was developed by Ryan Corey at Smog Design from a photo music video director Sophie Muller had taken of graffiti four years prior. The "Girls Talk" single was pressed to 10" green vinyl, limited to 4,000 units, backed with "Time Will Destroy Everything", however in the United Kingdom black vinyls were also pressed. In the United States, "Girls Talk" was listed as a 'Record Store Day First' release. On May 6, the single was made available on digital platforms.

In 2021, both "Girls Talk" and "Time Will Destroy Everything" would be remastered and included on the deluxe edition bonus disc of Garbage's seventh album, No Gods No Masters.

== Music video ==
A music video for "Girls Talk" was uploaded on the band's YouTube channel and premiered on Stereogum on May 4, 2014. It was shot by Vig and edited by Sophie Muller. The black-and-white video features Manson and Dalle recording vocals for the track in studio.

== Track listing ==
- 10" single (Record Store Day release) STNVOL-008
1. "Girls Talk" – 3:34
2. "Time Will Destroy Everything" – 4:44

== Charts ==
Chart performance for "Girls Talk"
| Chart (2014) | Peak position |
|---|---|
| UK Physical Singles (The Official Charts Company) | 27 |
| US Hot Singles Sales (Billboard) | 10 |

== Release history ==
Release history and formats for "Girls Talk"
| Region | Release date | Record label | Format |
|---|---|---|---|
| United States, Canada, United Kingdom & Europe | April 19, 2014 | Stunvolume | 10" vinyl |
| Various | May 6, 2014 | Stunvolume | Digital download |
