= Control (Garbage song) =

Single by Garbage

from the album Not Your Kind of People
- Released: October 2012
- Recorded: 2010–2011
- Studio: Red Razor Sounds; King Size North Studios; California, US
- Genre: Alternative rock
- Length: 4:13
- Label: Stunvolume
- Songwriter: Garbage
- Producer: Garbage

Garbage singles chronology
"Big Bright World" (2012)	"Control" (2012)	"Automatic Systematic Habit" (2012)

"Control" is the second North American and fourth overall single released from alternative rock band Garbage's fifth studio album, Not Your Kind of People, and was sent to radio stations across the United States in October 2012.

== Background and composition ==
"Control" was written and recorded during the 2010–2011 sessions for Not Your Kind of People in Los Angeles and is one of the examples of the "guerrilla style" approach the band took with the sound on the album.

"Control" was mostly composed by drummer Butch Vig, who also plays harmonica on the track. Vig explained "[m]y six-year-old daughter has a harmonica and she left it in my home studio. We were working on the song one morning and I picked it up and started blowing on it. I can’t really play harmonica, the part is dead simple, anyone could figure it out. I didn’t think we would actually use it and then we left it in the song, we mixed it. The band were inspired by the song "When the Levee Breaks" by Led Zeppelin and used it as a reference point to bring guitars into the mix and seeing how far they could push their sound and channel the groove. Guitarist Duke Erikson came up with the bridge idea and added "we wanted to make the last chorus totally chaotic, so I opened up the gate and ran a pulse through it. The whole song sounded like it was out of control." Erikson recalls playing a Fender Telecaster on the verses and a Stratocaster on the second chorus, although "there might have been a SG involved".

Lyrically, "Control" is about giving up any control in your life, surrendering yourself to whatever is going on," explained singer Shirley Manson, "...and committing yourself to it in that moment." Manson added that "Control" is about "facing the fact that we are all ultimately gonna die and why are we holding on to these weird, fixed ideas of who we are, what we are, what we’re capable of. It’s about urgency. It’s about vigor, about life and letting things move through you instead of holding on tight."

The single cover designed by the band's graphic artist Ryan Corey features a cat's skull.

== Release and promotion ==
The song was first teased ahead of its release on August 30, 2011, when the band posted a video of Vig recording drums on their Facebook page. A second teaser of the song was posted on February 1, 2012.

"Control" was released as second North American and fourth overall single from Garbage's fifth studio album, Not Your Kind of People. The band mastered a radio version of the song for airplay featuring a third chorus in place of the breakdown that marks the album version of the song. Garbage later pressed a limited edition 7" vinyl single for "Control" and released it through their website. It was backed with a remix of the lead single "Blood for Poppies".

On October 3, 2012, "Control" was performed on Jimmy Kimmel Live! The song was also performed heavily during the Not Your Kind of People World Tour and was used to open concerts in the band's 2019 headline tour.

In 2022, the song was remastered by Heba Kadry and included in Garbage's third greatest hits album Anthology, out October 28.

== Reception ==
Reception to the song was greatly positive, with critics often praising the track as a highlight on Not Your Kind of People.

Carl Williott of Idolator described the song as "a ferocious, fuzzed-out rocker with a driving bass line and a harmonica-on-steroids train whistle effect that demands your listening attention." Tom Hocknell in his review for BBC Music compared the song to "The Smiths on steroids" and complimented it for demonstrating "the joyful abandonment in surrendering yourself to sing-along industrial pop angst." In his 4/5 stars review of Not Your Kind of People, Dave Simpson of The Guardian commended the song's "[s]tadium-sized hooks". Emma Smith of The Line of Best Fit was also positive, praising the song as "immediately arresting and anthemic". In his review for Consequence of Sound, Adam Kivel picked "Control" as one of the essential tracks of the album, writing that "the twinkling waves of piano that open “Control” is pure production mastery, and the sludgy bass and dark, relationship-based lyrics [...] are vintage Garbage." Despite giving the album a lukewarm review and calling it "dated", Jonathan Keefe of Slant picked "Control" as one of the few "standout tracks" on Not Your Kind of People. Similarly, Jason Heller of The AV Club gave the album a C+ review but praised "Control" as one of "the bright spots", describing it as "a propulsive slab of clattering, industrial melancholia in which Manson morphs from chanteuse to tsunami at the drop of a beat." Q Magazine also praised the track for its Garbage signature sound.

On a negative note, in his review for Drowned in Sound, Sean Thomas criticized the lyrics of the chorus for their "faux-angst content".

== In other media ==
On June 26, 2012, "Control" was used in the 2012 video game The Amazing Spider-Man and featured in the launch trailer of the game. "Control" featured in episode 16 of season 4 of The Vampire Diaries and was also used as the promo song for the episode, broadcast on March 14, 2013.

== Track listing ==
- 7" single
1. "Control"
2. "Blood for Poppies" (Blaqk Audio Remix)

== Release history ==
Release history and formats for "Control"
Region	Release date	Record label	Format
United States	August 27, 2012	Stunvolume	Airplay
DTC	October 2012	Stunvolume	7" vinyl, via band website
