= Automatic Systematic Habit =

Single by Garbage

from the album Not Your Kind of People
- Released: November 2012
- Recorded: 2010–2011
- Studio: Red Razor Sounds; King Size North Studios; California, US
- Genre: Alternative rock; post-punk revival; electronica
- Length: 3:18
- Label: Stunvolume
- Songwriter: Garbage
- Producer: Garbage

Garbage singles chronology
| "Control" (2012) | "Automatic Systematic Habit" (2012) | "Because the Night" (2013) |

"Automatic Systematic Habit" is the third and final European radio airplay (fifth overall) single released from alternative rock band Garbage's fifth studio album, Not Your Kind of People. Copies were sent to radio stations across Europe in November 2012.

Earlier in the year, Garbage released "Automatic Systematic Habit" as a free digital download via iTunes in the United States on May 8, 2012 — a week before the album was released. Garbage later pressed a limited edition 7" vinyl single for "Big Bright World" and released it through their website. It was backed with "Automatic Systematic Habit" on the B-side.

== Background ==
The inspiration for "Automatic Systematic Habit" came from a general idea of people messing others around: "I'm a very flawed individual, but I'm very forthright and I don't play games with people", Shirley Manson explained. "At the same time, I know people aren't always so straight with me. That's been a been a real frustration for me my whole life. I find it exhausting trying to figure out what people are trying to say — or sometimes, what they're trying not to say." Musically, the synth-European vibe of the instrumental led to the track being referred to as "Electro" as a working title ("A dance song that was concocted just as sort of a lark, really," multi-instrumentalist Duke Erikson revealed). Manson recorded her first vocal take with a German accent: "There was a pause after I finished and I said, 'Well, that's the idea. What do you think?' and I remember Steve Marker and Duke looking at each other going, 'We like it. We like it. I think you should drop the German accent.'"

== Critical reception ==
Critical response to "Automatic Systematic Habit" was fairly positive upon the release of Not Your Kind of People. Theo Spielberg of Spinner described the song as "razor-sharp [and] electro-roughed".

== Track listings ==
- Digital single
1. "Automatic Systematic Habit" – 3:18
- Beatport remix single
1. "Automatic Systematic Habit" (Costa Cadeu remix) – 4:38

== Release history ==
Release history and formats for "Automatic Systematic Habit"
| Region | Release date | Record label | Format |
|---|---|---|---|
| United States | May 8, 2012 | Stunvolume | Digital download |
| Europe | November 11, 2012 | Stunvolume | Airplay |
| Various | February 1, 2013 | Stunvolume | Beatport remix single |
