= Big Bright World =

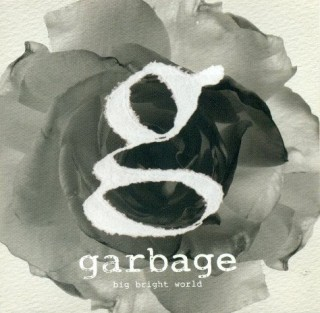

Single by Garbage

from the album Not Your Kind of People
- Released: June 1, 2012
- Recorded: 2010–2011
- Studio: Red Razor Sounds; King Size North Studios; California, US
- Genre: Alternative rock
- Length: 3:35
- Label: Stunvolume
- Songwriter(s): Garbage
- Producer(s): Garbage

Garbage singles chronology
"Battle in Me" (2012)	"Big Bright World" (2012)	"Control" (2012)

"Big Bright World" is the second worldwide single released from alternative rock band Garbage's fifth studio album, Not Your Kind of People. The single was issued as a digital download in Australia and New Zealand in June 2012, and was sent to radio stations across United Kingdom and Europe the following month.

Garbage later pressed a limited edition 7" vinyl single for "Big Bright World" and released it through their website. It was backed with album opener "Automatic Systematic Habit", which had been released as a free digital single via iTunes earlier in the year.

== Background ==
The genesis of "Big Bright World", came from a three-night bout of insomnia suffered by the band's guitarist, Steve Marker, while staying in an apartment on Hollywood and Vine: "[It] was probably about the noisiest place in the world that I've ever been. I couldn't sleep... and I grabbed an acoustic guitar and just did this little riff with some of the chorus of that song,". Marker added that "I got up early one morning in a somewhat psychotic state – and the song was just there. I had Pro Tools on my laptop, so I grabbed an acoustic guitar and banged it out really fast – not the whole thing, but the gist of it. I e-mailed it to everybody else and went back to sleep. It all happened within the space of 20 minutes," Marker later told Music Radar.

Marker played it back for vocalist Shirley Manson, who loved it. "To me, it's probably the most anthemic track on the record," remarked drummer Butch Vig later. "We were really excited as a band to get back together and that song captures the excitement of us playing together for the first time in a long time," Manson added. Vig suggested using low-spec keyboards on the intro verse, reminiscent of the band Suicide, while Manson fleshed out the lyrics from the initial few lines Marker provided. He also wrote more synth-like guitar parts later; "I did some of those at home with a Guild Bluesbird. I'm playing slide – using a lot of compression [to produce] a real synth sound". The band used Telecasters to record more recognisable guitar parts throughout.

== Critical reception ==
Richard Purden, of The Herald, described "Big Bright World" as "a typically radio-friendly earworm reminiscent of Berlin-period U2", referencing that bands Achtung Baby album, which Garbage had recently recorded a cover of "Who's Gonna Ride Your Wild Horses" for an anniversary tribute record.

== Music video ==
The music video for "Big Bright World" was directed by Julie Orser, and filmed in June 2012. The video was premiered on Garbage's VEVO channel on August 19, 2012. Garbage fans were asked to take part in the filming of the video's underwater scenes. These were shot in the swimming pool of a private residence in Thousand Oaks, California on June 22.

"Big Bright World" was the first music video that Orser directed; she also edited the footage herself. Visuals presented in the clip included images of nature and people in motion, swimming underwater and running through a tunnel, interwoven with footage of Manson singing while shrouded in a black veil and gown, along with shots of a graveyard and religious icons. Orser had previously shot behind-the-scenes footage for a series of social media mini-films for Garbage, which led to her involvement with the video. "Manson is an absolute pleasure to work with," Orser told CSU, "We really connected; I liked them, and they liked my work... It was really fun to do and a different way of working with a client. It's a very different process, but really rewarding." Orser also spoke of the blend of "their need and your creative desire and coming to a middle ground."

== Track listing ==
- 7" single
1. "Big Bright World" – 3:36
2. "Automatic Systematic Habit" – 3:18

== Release history ==
Release history and formats for "Big Bright World"
Region	Release date	Record label	Format
Australia	June 1, 2012	Stunvolume	Digital download (as an album cut)
United Kingdom	July 30, 2012	Stunvolume	Scheduled single release
Various	October 2012	Stunvolume	7" vinyl, via band website
