= Battle in Me =

- Digital single cover

Single by Garbage

from the album Not Your Kind of People
- A-side: "Blood for Poppies"
- Released: March 28, 2012
- Recorded: 2010–2011
- Studio: Red Razor Sounds; King Size North Studios; California, US
- Genre: Alternative rock, post-grunge, industrial rock
- Length: 4:16
- Label: Stunvolume
- Songwriter: Garbage
- Producer: Garbage

Garbage singles chronology
"Blood for Poppies" (2012)	"Battle in Me" (2012)	"Big Bright World" (2012)

Alternative cover
- 7" single cover

"Battle in Me" is a song from rock band Garbage, serving as the lead single from its fifth studio album Not Your Kind of People. It was released on March 28, 2012, to promote the album in United Kingdom. "Battle in Me" preceded the band's underplayed headliner concert in London, and served as the band's Record Store Day 2012 release in Europe, marking the band's return after a 7-year hiatus. It showcases their signature blend of alternative rock, post-grunge, and industrial rock elements.

The song received positive reviews from critics, who praised its energetic composition and the band's return to their classic sound. Garbage promoted "Battle in Me" through live performances, including a notable appearance on The Late Show with David Letterman on March 19, 2013.

== Background ==
"Battle in Me" was the first new song Garbage created when the sessions for Not Your Kind of People were convened in early 2010 in The Pass studio in Hollywood. Starting out in a recording studio with the rule that nobody could bring in old demos or ideas, "Battle in Me" sprung from the group jamming. The initial take amounted to 20 minutes of material saved to hard drive and some of the vocals were recorded during these very first jam sessions. Garbage took the material to their own respective home studios and edited the track separately to form the song. Guitarist Steve Marker's parts were inspired by Jimmy Page, after watching the documentary It Might Get Loud the night prior to the session.

The lyrics to the song were mostly written as the band jammed together. As singer Shirley Manson later pointed out, the line "Let's take a torch to the past and the future" is her "mantra" reflecting on being in the moment and being the truest version of herself, also in the context of making music. "You don't have to be married to who you were. This sense of liberation seems missing in the current musical climate – it seems so overly sexualised now. People like Rihanna and Lady Gaga are sexual, but they're doing it in an interesting way. What scares me is that there's no alternative to that pop world," she explained. Vig said the song was one of his favourites to play live.

After initial reception to the track's lyrics saying it was Manson's "cougar song," Manson clarified that the song deals with the first time she had sex, an experience she recalls as "unpleasant" and "a disappointment." In other instances, Manson expanded on the event, saying she lost her virginity when she was 15 with a much older music teacher "in the back of his van after class" during an on-and-off "so called relationship" which lasted until she found out the man was having sex with other students as well. After this declaration led the Edinburgh City Council to start an inquiry, Manson felt the need to make clear that she was not a victim of abuse and that the relationship was fully consensual.

== Single release and promotion ==
Ahead of its premiere, "Battle in Me" was used as the soundtrack of a video the band uploaded on their YouTube channel to announce their return in January 2012, titled "Garbage Returns!" The song received its first radio broadcast on Steve Lamacq's BBC Radio 6 Music show on March 27, 2012, and the digital single appeared on digital stores a day later. The audio that Garbage posted on their YouTube channel is the radio edit of the song, featuring a shorter intro.

On April 21, "Battle in Me" was also issued as a limited edition 7" single to mark Record Store Day and was distributed throughout participating independent record stores. The press run of the red vinyl was limited to 500 units, and was backed with "Blood for Poppies".

The song was debuted live on April 7 at the Bootleg Theater in Los Angeles and was performed at concerts for the duration of the Not Your Kind of People World Tour. On May 2, Garbage posted a professionally filmed live rehearsal video of the song shot in Los Angeles directed by Julie Orser. The video was sent to Rolling Stone Brasil to promote the single. On May 15, the day of Not Your Kind of People release, Garbage performed the song on French TV show Album de la semaine. On March 19, 2013, Garbage performed the song on The Late Show with David Letterman.

In 2022, the song was remastered by Heba Kadry and included in the band's third greatest hits compilation Anthology.

== Critical reception ==
Reception to "Battle In Me" was mostly positive, with critics noting the song's Garbage signature sound. For instance, Marc Hogan of Spin noted the similarity of the sound of with Garbage's older material, writing the song "offers another batch of explosive hooks, maximal cyber-distortion, and powerhouse drums straight out the group’s ’90s heyday." A similar sentiment was shared by Gabriel Rolim of MonkeyBuzz, who, despite giving Not Your Kind of People a lukewarm review, was positive about the song, complimenting its industrial rock sound and comparing it to Nine Inch Nails. However, Riccardo Zagaglia of Italian publication SentireAscoltare was negative about the track's sound, labeling the similarity of the song to older Garbage material as "self-quotationism."

Nick Levine of NME commended the "military-style drums, stop-start hooks and a bassline that's on loan from "Livin' On a Prayer" saying the song was even better than previous single "Blood For Poppies". Emma Smith of The Line of Best Fit commended the band's studio abilities, writing ""Battle In Me" and "Man on a Wire" are both pretty cut and dry in theory with their cold, sharp guitars and riff-based centres, but their focus and energy serve to remind you how amazing this band are at songwriting."

Criticism to the band's delivery came from Enio Chiola of PopMatters, who felt the song shared a similar sentiment to that of Garbage's angst-filled "Vow," but noted "this time it feels forced and disingenuous."

== Track listings ==
- Digital single
1. "Battle in Me" − 4:16
- UK 7" single (Record Store Day edition)
1. "Battle in Me" – 4:16
2. "Blood for Poppies" – 3:40

== Charts ==
Chart performance for "Battle in Me"
Chart (2012)	Peak position
UK Physical Singles (The Official Charts Company) Credited as "Blood for Poppies"	28

== Release history ==
Release history and formats for "Battle in Me"
Territory	Release date	Record label	Format
United Kingdom	March 28, 2012	Stunvolume	Digital single
Ireland	March 28, 2012	Stunvolume	Digital single
Europe	April 21, 2012	Stunvolume	7" vinyl (Record Store Day 2012)
