= Blood for Poppies =

Single by Garbage

from the album Not Your Kind of People
- Released: March 26, 2012
- Recorded: 2010–2011
- Studio: Red Razor Sounds; King Size North Studios; California, United States
- Genre: Alternative rock
- Length: 3:38
- Label: Stunvolume
- Songwriter: Garbage
- Producer: Garbage

Garbage singles chronology
"Tell Me Where It Hurts" (2007)	"Blood for Poppies" (2012)	"Battle in Me" (2012)

Music video
- "Blood For Poppies" on YouTube

"Blood for Poppies" is a song by American alternative rock band Garbage's fifth studio album Not Your Kind of People (2012). It was released as the album's lead single on March 26, 2012 by Stunvolume. On April 20, a limited edition 7-inch single was released for Record Store Day in the United States. Garbage selected the song as the first single as it "encapsulates" the band.

== Background ==
The nucleus of "Blood for Poppies" came from sessions Shirley Manson held to write her abandoned solo album project. The track began as a dub-style jam. The song kept being refined to its component groove and bassline as Manson refined her own vocal approach to the track. It was her idea to incorporate "strobing vocals" and "weird, glitchy vocal production elements" on the song. Duke Erikson added clean, vibrato melodic lead guitar parts to the verses. Steve Marker wrote the "monster riff" and added it late in the song's development. Synth effects were created by running keyboards through wah wahs and mixing the results with similarly recorded electric guitar parts, while the recurring distorted guitar lick was recorded through an amp mod into his laptop.

Drum tracks were largely created by layering live drum takes over a drum machine; "Blood for Poppies" opens with heavily distorted fill followed up with a funky drum groove, the verse then featuring open hi-hat notes leading into each backbeat. During the chorus, the pattern changes to a sixteenth-note hi-hat pattern. Inspired by a suggestion by Manson, the band worked the beat of the middle eight section around a sample of the sound of a helicopter's blades. Manson wanted the vocal in that section to sound like it was a garbled radio transmission, so the band treated her vocal with various plug-ins. Bass guitar parts were recorded by Justin Meldal-Johnsen.

"Blood for Poppies" was one of the first songs finished during the Not Your Kind of People sessions. "The song is meant to feel sort of like an abstract dream," Garbage singer Shirley Manson recalled. "The inspiration came from a story I had read in Los Angeles Times about the opium trade and also from watching the documentary Restrepo. It's not literal in any sense whatsoever but it's a song about disorientation and delusion and the human struggle to stay sane in the face of insanity." Manson later explained: "Actually it's from a few stories... I use that as a backdrop for a story about maintaining sanity in an out-of-control place." The band added that the song was also a metaphor for being in a band: "...feeling isolated and lonely. There's the line 'I miss my dog, I miss my freedom,' and that's [Manson's] dog she's singing about".

== Single release ==
From March 15, 2012, "Blood for Poppies" was given away free as a digital download by Garbage via their own band website. In a statement issued to mark the free release, the band wrote: "We've always had the most amazingly loyal fans, and we wanted to show them just how much they mean to us by setting it free to them first". "Blood for Poppies" had leaked online earlier in the week.

"Blood for Poppies" was sent for "adds" at alternative radio in the United States on March 20, where it was playlisted by nine stations. A week later, the song was playlisted by a further nineteen stations, including eight on the Triple-A format. Four alternative stations in Canada also added the song. The same day, "Blood for Poppies" was released as a downloadable single across North America, and was made available as a free track to download straight-away when pre-ordering the downloadable version of Not Your Kind of People. After a week at alternative, "Blood for Poppies" debuted on the Billboard Rock Songs chart at No. 45. On April 20, a limited edition 7-inch single marking Record Store Day 2012 was released to participating independent record stores. The white-vinyl single press run for "Blood for Poppies" totalled 2,500 units, of which 1,900 copies were distributed throughout the United States, and was backed with an exclusive Butch Vig remix of the song.

In Europe, "Blood for Poppies" was released as a digital single across the continent on March 28. An Australasian release followed the subsequent day. In the United Kingdom, "Battle in Me" was released as the album's lead single instead, however "Blood for Poppies" was A-listed by Kerrang! radio and a digital single was released to some music stores on May 7. The single was also released digitally in Japan as an album-cut on April 18. A month later, "Blood for Poppies" debuted at No. 97 on the Japan Hot 100, peaking at No. 47 in its second week.

== Critical reception ==
"Blood for Poppies" has been described by Billboard as "a mix of crunchy and funky guitars during the verse" and an "infectious, sing-along chorus"; while KROQ's Nadia Noir claimed it was "a song which conjures up some of the shimmering distortion, guitar tremolo, and the sensual shoegaze" of My Bloody Valentine's "Only Shallow", "albeit with the funkier, harder edge and Manson's sultry contralto vocals that make Garbage wholly unique". Rick Martin, of NME, described the song as "some righteous noise and a proper poptastic chorus to boot," and remarked; "If only all seven-year itches came with as much squalling feedback and eardrum-bursting goodness".

== Music video ==
Shirley Manson homages Un Chien Andalou in the "Blood for Poppies" music video.

The promotional video for "Blood for Poppies" was helmed by fashion photographer Matt Irwin and filmed over four days between February 23–26, 2012 in Los Angeles. Irwin co-directed the clip with Aaron Brown of Focus Creeps, following a concept theme of "old surrealist films and photos". Visuals created for the black and white clip were inspired by surrealist artists, film makers and photographers such as René Magritte, Maya Deren, Luis Buñuel and Francesca Woodman, while certain shots referenced Le Voyage Dans La Lune, At Land, and Un Chien Andalou. The video incorporates noir imagery, haute couture, 1950s glamour and stop-motion astronomy shots filtered to achieve a gritty, vintage effect. The retro look is the result of the video's post-production, special effects and editing; the "black and white" is sometimes grainy and burnt and the images often overlap.

Employing non-linear montage sequencing, Manson is seen singing while blindfolded, playing Cat's Cradle, eating an egg, cavorting on a Malibu beach and hiding behind a tree. The male band members are featured in a surrealist dream situations. "We piled into a transit van with the ridiculously talented team of Matt Irwin and Aaron Brown and hopped around little pockets of Los Angeles creating a gorgeous surrealist dream. We ate ice cream sandwiches in the sunshine and laughed a lot. I didn't want the shoot to end," recalled Manson.

The "Blood for Poppies" video debuted on AOL Music on April 3, following a live chat with the group on their Ustream channel. The video was published through YouTube and other music channels in United States on the same date, and debuted on Australian music channels on April 10. In the United States, the music video for "Blood for Poppies" was made available to purchase on iTunes on April 3. An edited version, with the eye-cutting scene removed, was later included as a bonus feature on the 2013 release One Mile High... Live.

== Track listings ==
- Downloadable single
1. "Blood for Poppies" – 3:38
- US 7-inch single (Record Store Day edition)
1. "Blood for Poppies" – 3:38
2. "Blood for Poppies" (Heads Down Here We Come Remix) – 4:12

== Charts ==
Chart performance for "Blood for Poppies"
Chart (2012)	Peak position
Canada Rock (Billboard)	45
Japan Hot 100 (Billboard)	47
US Alternative Songs (Billboard)	17
US Hot Singles Sales (Billboard)	13
US Rock Songs (Billboard)	30
US Triple A (Billboard)	26

== Release history ==
Release history and formats for "Blood for Poppies"
Territory	Release date	Record label	Format
Various	March 15, 2012	Stunvolume	Free music download from Garbage.com
United States	March 20, 2012	Stunvolume	Alternative rock radio
United States	March 26, 2012	Stunvolume	AAA
Canada	March 26, 2012	Stunvolume	Downloadable single
United States	March 26, 2012	Stunvolume	Downloadable single
Australia	March 27, 2012	Stunvolume	Downloadable single
New Zealand	March 27, 2012	Stunvolume	Downloadable single
Denmark	March 28, 2012	Stunvolume	Downloadable single
France	March 28, 2012	Stunvolume	Downloadable single
Germany	March 28, 2012	Stunvolume	Downloadable single
Norway	March 28, 2012	Stunvolume	Downloadable single
Spain	March 28, 2012	Stunvolume	Downloadable single
Japan	April 18, 2012	Stunvolume	Downloadable single
United States	April 21, 2012	Stunvolume	7" vinyl (Record Store Day)
