= Julie Orser =

American visual artist

- Born: 1974; Chicago, Illinois, United States
- Education: California Institute of the Arts; Pacific Northwest College of Art
- Known for: Video, photography, installation
- Awards: Center for Cultural Innovation, California Community Foundation
- Website: Julie Orser

Julie Orser, Occurrence at Lookout Rock, four-channel video & sound installation, 6 min. loop, 2005; installation image, Torrance Art Museum, 2024.

Julie Orser (born 1974) is an American contemporary visual artist based in Los Angeles. Orser merges art and cinema in video, animation, photography and installation works that examine mainstream representations of gender, the female psyche, place and time. Her practice engages with the mechanics and history of American cinema in order to deconstruct genre conventions, narrative structures and character archetypes from a feminist perspective. She isolates specific scenes, gestures and moods and amplifies mise-en-scène (setting, lighting or costume), creating recontextualizations that reveal stereotypes and often unnoticed aspects of filmmaking. In an Artforum review, Andrew Berardini wrote that Orser's work constructed "a female image that falls somewhere between icon and cliché … deftly re-creat[ing] the lurid dramas of cinematic pulp to study them as sites of fictional femininity."

Orser has screened or exhibited work at venues including the Museum of Modern Art, Utah Museum of Contemporary Art, New Britain Museum of American Art, Norton Museum of Art, and Museum of Contemporary Art Santa Barbara, among others. Her art belongs to the permanent collections of the Los Angeles County Museum of Art, Museum of Contemporary Art Los Angeles, and The Museum of Fine Arts, Houston. She is a professor in the Creative Photography & Experimental Media program at California State University, Fullerton (CSUF).

== Education and career ==
Orser was born in 1974 in Chicago and grew up in the suburbs north of the city. She moved to the West Coast to study photography at Pacific Northwest College of Art (BFA, 1999), before settling in Los Angeles, where she earned an MFA at California Institute of the Arts (CalArts) in 2005.

Orser's early career included solo exhibitions at Paul Kopeikin Gallery and Steve Turner Contemporary in Los Angeles and Changing Role Gallery (Rome), as well as group shows at Magazzino d’Arte Moderna (Rome), Armory Center for the Arts and the Indianapolis Museum of Contemporary Art. More recent solo exhibitions have taken place at the Luckman Fine Arts Complex (2014), New Britain Museum (2015) and CSUF Grand Central Art Center (2017). She has also appeared in group shows at Künstlerhaus Bethanien (Berlin), the Norton Museum of Art, Yuz Museum Shanghai, and Torrance Art Museum.

In 2012 Orser created a music video, short films, and rehearsal and behind-the-scenes videos for the rock band Garbage for their album, Not Your Kind of People.

Julie Orser, Anna Moore, three channel video & sound installation, 6 min. loop, video still, 2007.

== Work and reception ==
Orser's art operates within and sometimes against the conventions of film genres including the western, melodrama, silent comedy and horror. Critics have compared her cinematically referential work to the late-1970s "Film Stills" of Cindy Sherman and to films by Douglas Sirk, Chantal Akerman and David Lynch. Orser magnifies and decontextualizes individual moments and filmic devices such as archetypal scenarios and props, genre music and Foley effects, or lighting tropes, while eschewing clear storylines. The resulting works instead mine the cinematic residue in a viewer's memory—visual and aural cues or narrative remnants—raising to awareness cinematic codes and cultural stereotypes such as the blond bombshell, male hero or "wild artist."

=== Individual projects ===
Orser's early work examined male-conceived representations of women and landscape, narrative expectations and subjectivity through the lens of the western and melodrama. The videos of Occurrence at Lookout Rock (2005) were shot at Joshua Tree National Park and placed character archetypes—the Lady, Saloon Girl, Cowgirl and Outlaw—individually in an overlapping, four-channel panorama of rocky, Hollywood desert setting, free of narrative. Scored with spaghetti Western music, the videos culminate not in the anticipated showdown but with a revolving camera pan and shift of subjectivity in which the characters unexpectedly disappear. In the video Bottleneck (2011) ,Orser restaged the well-known, violent "catfight" from the 1939 western film Destry Rides Again with two stuntwomen fighting in isolation in a generic art studio space (rather than a bar full of men); scored with the original soundtrack of male hooting and hollering, the video ruptures image-sound relationships, calling into question the older film's construction of such female tropes.

In other projects, Orser explored the hyperfeminine female characters of 1940s and 1950s melodrama, film noir and tabloid media. Her 2007 multimedia installation, Anna Moore, mimicked the interior of a house, giving shape and context to a three-channel video of lush visuals portraying a scenario split between candy-colored suburbia and moody mystery centered on a classic 1950s Grace Kelly-style blonde. In oscillating scenes interspersed with dream-like close-ups of sexual caresses—and unified by character narration—the women appears as a primly dressed, perfect housewife and a wigged, black-suited femme fatale; in a third scenario, in the guise of a distraught, highly made-up glamour queen, the heroine finds release from that seemingly suffocating double bind.

Julie Orser, New Narrators ..., HD animation, 33 sec. loop, animation still, 2018.

For the project Madeleine (2014), Orser considered the iconic Hitchcock blonde from the 1958 film Vertigo as a site of desire, obsession and onscreen fabrication. The project's installation echoed the film's haunted quality with images and prop representations of its locales, scenes and light without characters—placing viewers in their stead. Juxtaposed were images of six different blonde women portraying the Madeleine character in flipbook-like, rotating head shots from front to back, which recalled the Pygmalion-like attempts of the film's male protagonist (and Hitchcock) to bring a certain vision of the female to life. Orser turned to the horror genre in the pastiche video, Blood Work (2009), which intercut quintessential props (leather handbag, high heeled shoe, lampshade) being doused with bright fake blood with images of a perpetrator, set to iconic horror sounds and music to both comical and uneasy effect.

In later video works, Orser has examined male stereotypes and Hollywood conventions. Captain Rooftop (2017) offered an absurdist, feminist take on an obsolete masculine figure—a pirate—whose determination to posture and hold his ground proves futile as the surrounding environment literally becomes unstable. In the collage-like work New Narrators ... (2018), Orser appropriated 1940s and 1950s print images of white men in suits and animated them being plucked out of frame by women's hands in a range of skin tones. For Forest Ambience 2 [Special Mix]: Happy Birds (2019), she spliced together film clips that used the same sound sample of birds singing in order to reveal the subtle ways sound is deployed for divergent moods and means.

== Recognition ==
Orser has been awarded artist grants from the Center for Cultural Innovation (2009, 2014), a California Community Foundation fellowship (2010), and a Lucas Artist Fellowship from the Montalvo Arts Center in 2023.
