= Not Your Kind of People =

Studio album by Garbage
- Released: May 11, 2012
- Recorded: 2010–2012
- Studios: Red Razor (Atwater Village, California); GrungeIsDead (Silver Lake, California) (Note: Additional recording); The Pass (Studio City, California); Snowglobe (Colorado); EastWest (Hollywood, California); Smart (Madison, Wisconsin)
- Genres: Alternative rock; electronic rock
- Length: 42:50
- Label: Stunvolume
- Producers: Garbage; Billy Bush

Garbage chronology
Absolute Garbage (2007)	Not Your Kind of People (2012)	The Absolute Collection (2012)

Singles from Not Your Kind of People
- 1. "Blood for Poppies" Released: March 26, 2012; 2. "Battle in Me" Released: March 28, 2012; 3. "Automatic Systematic Habit" Released: May 8, 2012; 4. "Big Bright World" Released: June 1, 2012; 5. "Control" Released: October 9, 2012

Not Your Kind of People is the fifth studio album by American rock band Garbage. It was released on May 11, 2012, through the band's own record label, Stunvolume. The album marks the return of the band after a seven-year hiatus that started with previous album Bleed Like Me. Guitarist Duke Erikson said at the launch of the record that "working with Garbage again was very instinctual. Like getting on a bicycle...with three other people." The band emphasized that they did not want to reinvent themselves, but embrace their sonic identity, reflecting their classic sound whilst updating it for 2012. Although Shirley Manson's morose dispositions have a presence on the record, many of the songs share a more optimistic outlook on life, influenced by some of Manson's personal experiences during their hiatus.

Recorded mostly at various recording studios in California, Not Your Kind of People was produced by Garbage, and was engineered and mixed by Billy Bush. The album contains bass guitar parts recorded by Justin Meldal-Johnsen while Finnish actress Irina Björklund performs the musical saw on one track. Both daughters of band-members Steve Marker and Butch Vig laid down vocals on the album's title track. Photos for the album package were shot by Autumn de Wilde at the Paramour Mansion in Silver Lake, Los Angeles.

Not Your Kind of People was preceded by the release of "Blood for Poppies" as the lead single internationally, while in the United Kingdom, "Battle in Me" was marketed as the album's lead single. The album also spawned three more singles, "Automatic Systematic Habit", "Big Bright World", and "Control". Not Your Kind of People received a generally positive reception from critics. It debuted at number 17 on the Billboard 200, at number 10 on the UK Albums Chart, peaked at number three on Billboard's Independent Albums chart and topped the Alternative Albums chart.

== Background ==
Garbage decided to take a hiatus in 2005, following the troubled production of their fourth studio album Bleed Like Me and cutting short the album's promotional tour. Aside from a reunion in 2007 to compose new tracks for the compilation Absolute Garbage, the band members found themselves involved in various projects, with Butch Vig producing Green Day, Foo Fighters, and Muse, while singer Shirley Manson recorded an unreleased solo album and made her professional acting debut as a series regular on Terminator: The Sarah Connor Chronicles.

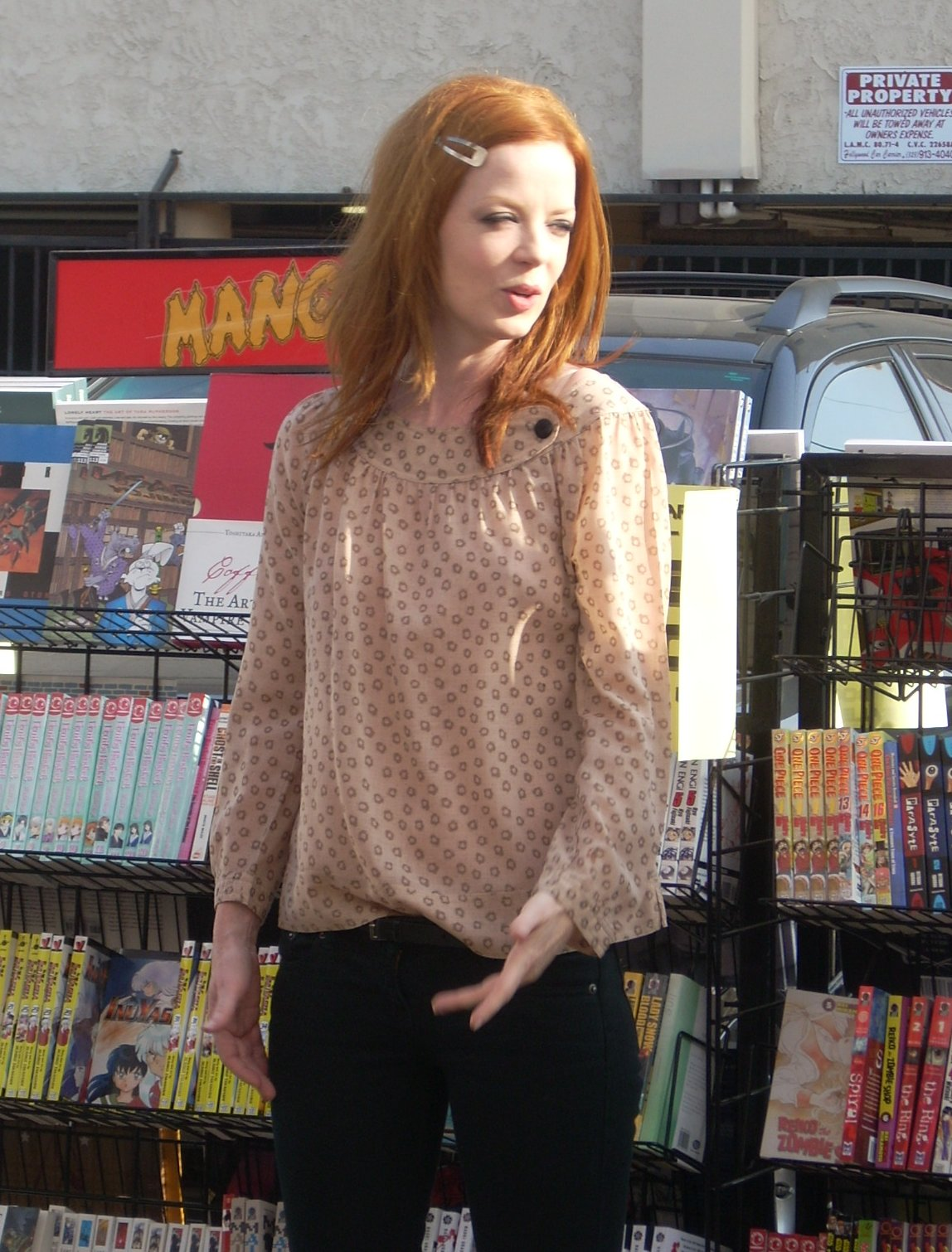
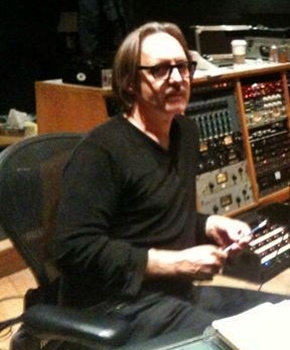
When Shirley Manson and Butch Vig met during Garbage's hiatus in 2009, they decided that the band had to get back together and write again.

In 2009, Vig and Manson met at the funeral of Pablo Castelaz, the six-year-old son of Dangerbird Records founder Jeff Castelaz, and had a conversation where, according to Vig, "we felt like we had some unfinished business, and we realized how precious life is and how important music has been in our lives." Manson suggested calling guitarists Duke Erikson and Steve Marker to get together and write some songs. One week later, the group informally convened in Los Angeles, where they laughed, drank, and reminisced of the old days, leaving behind the tensions among them and general weariness that was partly responsible for their 2005 breakup; they set up their equipment and "started fucking around". "We were all pleased to notice on the first day there just didn't seem to be any personal tensions," Vig recalled. "Enough time had passed that any sort of weirdness or tension that had risen between us all had dissipated. So it was easy. There was no one telling us what to do. We weren't signed to a label. We were between managers. So we made this on our own terms." In that session, the group wrote the song "Battle In Me".

In mid-2010, the entire group were in Los Angeles for a birthday, where Manson suggested they book a studio and spend time writing. Along with Garbage's long time engineer and Manson's husband Billy Bush, the band, as Bush described, "hung out for a couple weeks, drank some wine and played a bunch of music”. Three or four song ideas came together during this time. "But we didn't go right into making-a-record mode", Erikson recalled. "It took a bit of time for us to realize that we were going to make an album." Erikson described reconvening as a piecemeal process, saying that it informally began with the first phone conversations among them since their hiatus, as they discussed playing together again. After convening, and composing and performing song ideas together through multiple sessions, they then decided to move forward with the band and embark on a full-length album. The project took off in February 2011, when Manson called Vig proposing to reunite the band and try making a new record. Manson convoked the group out of an eagerness "to make loud music again". "I'm a loud person", she proclaimed; "I love noise and aggression. I crave contact. I needed to make that connection again. I think we all did. To get something back up when there was absolutely no momentum took a Herculean effort on everybody's part. It's like pulling yourself out of mud. Even to stand back up and say 'we're going to take another swing at this' was a scary feeling, and I'm proud of us for trying. It's much easier to stay at home.”

The band members stated that following the troublesome final years signed to Geffen Records, being an independent act again helped improve their mood and approach, with Vig remarking, "There were no expectations; no one even knew we were recording. So it was all under the radar and pretty casual and we all felt inspired after having that amount of time off ... when we started writing songs, they came fast and furious. We probably wrote 24, 25 songs over the course of a couple of months. Marker commented that "the business stuff ends up taking over some of that fun. We got really bogged down in people's expectations of what we were supposed to be doing, being on bigger record labels and stuff. With all that behind us, it was suddenly exciting again and it felt a lot like it did when we first formed, which was really just sort of a fun idea that we had." Manson added, "People at record companies live in fear of being wrong. Music cannot thrive in that environment. It is an unruly art form. You can't keep treating it like sausage meat. You have to let it morph and move and breathe."

Manson stated that eliminating the corporate pressure and indifference, as well as the band having a relaxed approach to the making of the record was pivotal for a healthy regroup, writing and recording process. "We didn't put any pressure on ourselves to finish an album... We just took our time and got together in two-week blocks of time – any longer than that I'm sure we would have started getting on each others' nerves. So we did two weeks and then we'd take some time off and then when everybody felt ready we'd get back in [the studio] again. As a result, I think everybody really enjoyed our time together and really plugged in", she remarked. Never much enjoying being in a studio, Manson relished the record-making process this time around.

== Recording ==
When we made the first record, we had nothing to lose. We said, 'Hey, let's put a record out, that would be fun.' We didn't even think we'd ever play live. It was really just for our own enjoyment. Now, here we are however many years later, and we didn't have a record company, we had no plans on touring. In some ways, we were in the same position, which I think was great, because there was nobody breathing down our necks. We had no pressure and no expectations on this. I think it really served us well just to do it for fun again.

— Steve Marker on recording independently

Unlike the previous albums, which were done at Vig's Smart Studios in Madison, Wisconsin, Not Your Kind of People was mostly recorded in Los Angeles, where both Vig and Manson live. Smart was only used for some of Erikson's parts, as he was the only bandmember still in Wisconsin. The working process was also different; while the previous records had the band gathering for an entire year at Smart Studios, the band would instead work two weeks per month in Los Angeles, with Erikson and Marker flying in from Wisconsin and Colorado, respectively, then spend another two weeks in their home studios while e-mailing ideas back and forth to develop songs. Manson would also visit Vig's GrungeIsDead studio to experiment with vocals. Then they would get back together in the studio, which according to Marker "would be fun again because we hadn't seen these people for a couple of weeks."

The first recordings were done in two weeks of jam sessions at The Pass in Studio City. The band then moved to Bush's studio Red Razor Sounds at Atwater Village, where the engineer did a rough mix of the tracks. Vig declared that the album's mood emerged from the combination of the "trashy and lo-tech" studio which he compared to a small clubhouse with the band's ProTools and samplers. The band had a looser approach to recording and mixing compared to the "nano-editing" of Version 2.0.

The band worked on estimatedly "25 or 26 songs" during the album sessions; While a few were still "bits and pieces", Vig stated they might finish them as further bonus tracks, B-sides, or as part of an EP at a later point. Erikson said that the bonus tracks of the deluxe edition are songs that were not ready in time to join the regular track list. He also said that while most songs were new compositions, some were old ideas, such as the "10 years old or something" track "Show Me". Throughout the recording sessions for the album, the band mentioned several song titles via Facebook and Twitter; these included: "Alone", "Animal", "Choose Your Weapon", "Time Will Destroy Everything" and "T.R.O.U.B.L.E.". Manson confirmed on Twitter that "Animal" became "The One", a song from the deluxe version, while "Time Will Destroy Everything" was released as the b-side to the band's 2014 Record Store Day single, "Girls Talk".

== Composition and style ==
According to Vig, Not Your Kind of People evokes ambient vibes of Garbage's first two albums, Garbage and Version 2.0: "There's lots of elements of things we've always loved: noisy guitars, big electronic beats, atmospheric film moments", adding that the band "wanted to make a record sound like something that we want to hear when we're driving the car." While the record was reminiscent "vibe-wise" of the band's early work, the production aimed for a rawer sound, instead of cleaning up the sound through computers, to "capture a performance" and "sound kind of trashy and for the songs to blow out a little bit." Vig said, "we tried to leave a lot of the performance raw on this album. A lot of the songs, we sort of throw paint at the wall and some of it sticks and some of it drips off." He explained that the group avoided reinventing themselves: "We wanted to just embrace exactly who we are and what we like to do and just sort of update it sonically for 2012. For better or worse, when we approach a song, it's going to end up sounding like Garbage. I think we have a strong sonic identity, and I think that's an asset these days." Manson similarly noted that what mattered most was the record sounding authentic to who they are as a band. Manson considered that while the record recalled the band's classic sound "it fits in with radio programming right now"; She said that they are interested in also reaching a new generation and, regarding their distinct sound, "We don't sound like anyone else on the radio. Much to our surprise there hasn't been another band like ours since we came off the road."

"Blood for Poppies"
Sample of the album's first single "Blood for Poppies", showcasing the album's mixture of rock and electronic sounds. The lyrics are inspired by stories on the opium trade.

Like the band's earlier releases, the album features a variety of guitar configurations as well as electronic synths. Erikson said that initially they gather with the standard guitar-bass-drum and keyboard gear, and as they pass around different ideas and implement them the songs take form in any which way a session takes them. "Once we started on the album proper, it became a Garbage record, which is any number of approaches to writing a recording. There were no rules, certainly", he explained. A song like "Automatic Systematic Habit" features more electronics than guitars, and "Big Bright World", a guitar-heavy song, involves configurations that make some of the guitars sound like synths. Guitar parts are normally divvied between guitarists Marker and Erikson. Erikson said it comes down to "Whoever comes up with what at any given time. There's no job description as far as lead guitar/rhythm guitar. It's just whoever has an idea as a articular [sic] moment. It's usually about 50/50". Erikson and Marker used a variety of guitars and pedals, old, new, and defective. "Felt" started with a simple riff and the music came quickly with slightly out of tune guitars and a reverb effect: Manson wanted a dreamy and ethereal production on her vocals as a nod to Cocteau Twins and she then added something thinking of how Siouxsie Sioux sang on the track "Drop Dead/Celebration".

Vig recalled that the title "Not Your Kind of People" came to him when he was stuck in a traffic jam in Los Angeles; he texted Manson the idea for a title and she loved it. Manson wrote all the lyrics that night, and the next day the four of them gathered with acoustic guitars and wrote the music to the song in about half an hour. Manson explained that the album title Not Your Kind of People was "a call to arms in a way to anyone who feels like we do about the world", saying that "it can be great to be outsider." She felt that this applied to them as the band "never fit into a music scene" and that "in my life I've never been an insider." Manson also described the title as "a two-fingered salute to people who reject or criticize us", stating the band was "only really interested in people who share our outlook" as she considered that their fans were "the people who connect with what you're saying and how you say it."

Most of the lyrics were written by Manson as she included and filtered some of her bandmates' ideas on songwriting. "It was a very do-it-yourself, homemade thing when it comes down to it", Erikson explained; "We all pitch in. Shirley had just as many comments on the guitar parts or the sound of the guitars as anybody else, and likewise, if we don't like a lyric, we say it right away." Many songs have a more optimistic view in life, inspired by Manson overcoming a desire to quit music after the death of her mother and realizing how important her work is to her. Darker themes still appear as Manson described herself as "enthusiastic and passionate, but I do see death marching toward me." "Blood for Poppies" came "from a lot of things", Manson said; "It's really an analogy for a story I read about Afghanistan and the opium wars over there ... it's from a few stories, one about a platoon of soldiers in Afghanistan and the other about the opium wars. I use that as a backdrop for a story about maintaining sanity in an out-of-control place." "[It's about] remaining sane, when faced with insanity", she added. "I Hate Love" criticized "the commercialized idea of love and what pain that puts us through" along with "knowing that there will be no more torture in your life than really, truly loving somebody who doesn't love you back."

"Big Bright World" contains a lyrical sample from the poem "Do not go gentle into that good night" by Dylan Thomas. Both daughters of Steve Marker and Butch Vig laid down vocals on the album's title track. Finnish actress Irina Björklund performs the musical saw on "Sugar". "Beloved Freak" includes a sample of Klaus Nomi, as the group felt the artist fit Manson's lyrics about "people being an outsider, feeling like a freak, and not fitting in and trying to come to terms with that it's okay to feel like you're an outsider."

KROQ-FM and MTV Buzzworthy described the sound of the album as electronic rock; The Huffington Post noted "the band has maintained their signature dark, driving, trip-hoppy sound", while Jason Heller of The A.V. Club wrote that "the group's shoegaze influences are more in vogue now than they were 15 years ago."

== Release and promotion ==
A post on Garbage's Facebook page on January 23, 2012 announced that the band launched their own record label, Stunvolume, to self-release their new studio album, distributed in the United States by Fontana. Overseas distribution deals were made with Cooperative Music, Liberator Music, Sony Music Japan and Universal Canada. On March 7, 2012, Garbage confirmed the album track listing via YouTube. Four further tracks recorded for the deluxe edition were confirmed later in a press release issued through the band's own label. In the United Kingdom, 250 copies of the deluxe edition were signed by Garbage and issued as part of the Record Store Day campaign. The album had a worldwide release date of May 14, 2012. At the launch of the record, guitarist Duke Erikson said that "working with Garbage again was very instinctual. Like getting on a bicycle... with three other people"; Erikson added, "We haven't felt this good about a Garbage record since the last one." Los Angeles-based studio SMOG Design handled the album's artwork and creative campaign, featuring band photographs by Autumn de Wilde. According to Duke Erikson, for the cover "there was some art that we wanted to do but we didn't want to spend what the artist wanted us to", so instead of "a very colorful and complex cover" they opted to go the other way and be simplistic, with only a lowercase "g".

=== Singles ===
"Blood for Poppies" was confirmed as the lead single to launch the album. The song was made available for free digital download from the group's website after it leaked online early. A digital single was confirmed for release in Australia; while a limited edition 7" single, backed with an exclusive remix by Butch Vig, was distributed to independent record stores across North America to mark Record Store Day on April 21, 2012. "Battle In Me" was confirmed as the lead-single exclusively for the United Kingdom. A limited edition 7" vinyl was issued on April 21 to mark Record Store Day, while a proper commercial release followed on May 7, 2012. To promote the album, "Automatic Systematic Habit" was released as a free download through iTunes in the US on May 8, 2012. "Big Bright World" was released as the album's second single in Australia on June 1, 2012. On July 8, Manson announced that "Control" was the band's next US single.

=== Songs in other media ===
In the same year of release, "Blood for Poppies" appeared in an episode of True Blood titled "Whatever I Am, You Made Me", while "Control" was used in the 2012 video game The Amazing Spider-Man and featured in the launch trailer of the game. The song also appeared in the season 4 episode of The Vampire Diaries "Bring It On". The title track, "Not Your Kind of People", was re-recorded in simlish and featured on the newly added "Dark Wave" radio station in The Sims 3: Supernatural expansion pack. "Sugar" appeared in an episode of The Following, and "Not Your Kind of People", was also later featured in its entirety in the trailer and soundtrack for Metal Gear Solid V: The Phantom Pain. in addition to being the closing song for the final season of the spanish web series “La plaga de la ira”

== World tour ==
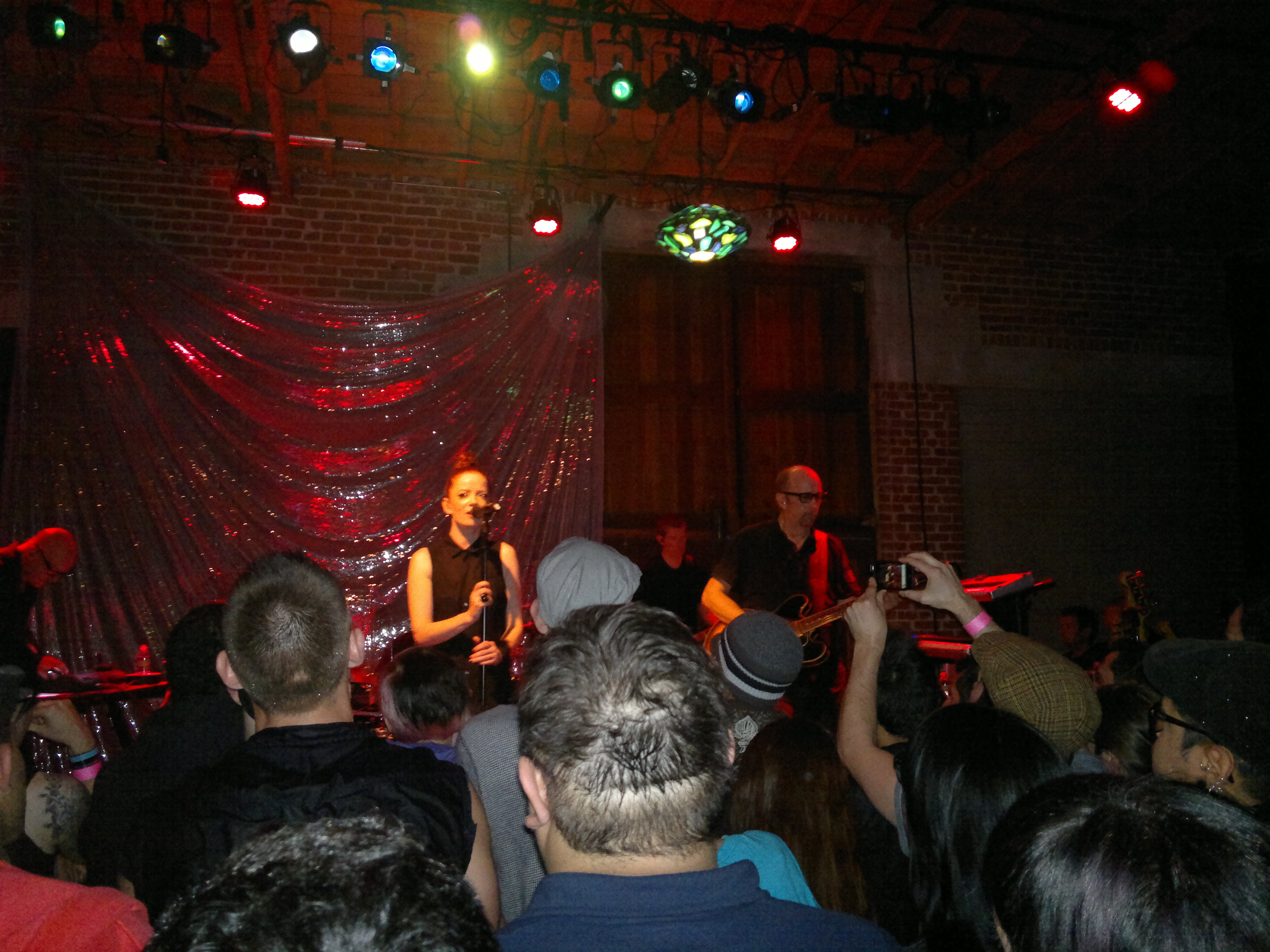
The tour opening concert at Los Angeles' Bootleg Theater.

In late 2011, Garbage announced their return to touring upon the release of Not Your Kind of People, marking the band's first live performances since 2007, and their first tour since 2005. "Thinking about going back on the road is both thrilling and terrifying in equal measure," Manson stated, "...but we've always enjoyed a little pain mixed in with our pleasure." Manson considered that self-reflection helped change the way the group approached touring, and, as a result, "we're playing the best shows of our career." Eric Avery, who performed with the band during their Bleed Like Me tour, rejoined them as the tour bassist. The band played concerts throughout North and South America, Europe, Oceania and Asia.

== Critical reception ==
Professional ratings
Aggregate scores
Source	Rating
AnyDecentMusic?	6.0/10
Metacritic	63/100
Review scores
Source	Rating
AllMusic	3.5/5 stars
Entertainment Weekly	B
Clash	3/10
The Guardian	4/5 stars
NME	3/10
Pitchfork	6.4/10
Rolling Stone	3.5/5 stars
Spin	8/10
The Irish Times	4/5 stars
Virgin Media	4/5 stars

Not Your Kind of People received generally positive reviews from critics. At AnyDecentMusic?, which collects critical reviews from more than 50 media sources, the album scored 6.0 points out of 10, based on 33 reviews. At Metacritic, which assigns a normalized rating out of 100 to reviews from mainstream critics, it received a weighted average score of 63 based on 28 reviews, indicating "generally favorable reviews".

In his review for The Guardian, Dave Simpson gave the album four out of five stars, stating that it "returns to the blueprint of their first two, best albums" while lessening the electronics and augmenting the crunchy guitars, with a contemporary production. He praised the title track, deeming it a "surprise" and a "beautiful, otherworldly cross between a John Barry Bond theme and a David Bowie outsider anthem." Cameron Adams of The Courier-Mail wrote that "musically, they still find that sweet spot between Motown and Nirvana, via the Pretenders and Prodigy", and considered it "refreshing" that the band is "still pushing pop music to its darkest limits."

AllMusic's Stephen Thomas Erlewine said that unlike their previous two albums, "there is no grappling with new sounds and styles, only an embrace of the thick aural onslaught of "Stupid Girl" and "Vow". He complimented Manson's "keenly aware lyrics" and said that their hooks are efficiently delivered while "no flab in either the composition or production" is evident. He summarized the album "as a simultaneous testament and revival of their strengths", but "what once was futuristic now sounds nostalgic." Tim Grierson wrote in The About Group that out of the many '90s bands that reunited in the last few years, "none have done it with as much gusto as Garbage" as they "return with their sexy, edgy vibe intact" and Manson "sounds as ferocious and bruised as ever."

The Bangkok Post noted that the band "stick[s] firmly to their '90s alt rock guns." Their "fuzzy-guitar/catchy-hook formula continues to dominate the album" and amidst the fuzz and electronics, "the title-track, Sugar and Beloved Freak do offer moments of (relatively) quiet bliss" — songs that "refreshingly showcase the essence of Manson's voice". It is proposed however that, apart from older, devoted 90's fans, the album probably won't connect with contemporary audiences. In his review for Time, Adam Kivel likewise stated that the album is most likely to resonate with fans of 90's alternative fusion, characterizing it as "an anomaly" in the current musical climate and not likely to gain significant radio-play. Lindsay Zoladz of Pitchfork Media summarized the album as "a statement from a band that's stuck, combatively, to its guns. The times have changed but Garbage haven't, and now, for better and for worse, they've at last become alternative to everything."

NME writer Rick Martin, despite hearing "flashes of their previous class" proving "they haven't completely lost their confrontational electro-rock streak", considered too much of it "pedestrian, anodyne and utterly unremarkable", and wondered "why they ever ditched the near-perfect mid-'90s FM rock of "Stupid Girl"." BBC Music writer Tom Hocknell felt that the band's relocation to L.A. made "no discernible difference to the band's sound" but that "despite occasional lapses into overproduced mess, the surprise here is their enthusiasm." Similarly, Jamie Carson of Clash disapproved of the production, calling it "pompousness" and "annoying", and Mark Davison of No Ripcord remarked that "for all the interesting noises that the band have come up with ... the production really doesn't do them any favours, cramming them into a fairly narrow space and stripping them almost entirely of any sense of atmosphere", concluding that the album is nonetheless "enjoyable, and will probably go down better than their last two releases."

Not Your Kind of People was listed at number 44 on Rolling Stone's list of the top 50 albums of 2012.

== Commercial performance ==
In the United States, Not Your Kind of People was released exclusively through iTunes during its first week, and debuted at number 17 on the Billboard 200 with 19,000 digital copies sold in its first week. In its second week, the album rose to number 13 with sales of over 22,000 copies. As of June 2016, the album has sold 98,000 copies in the US. In the United Kingdom, it became the band's fifth top-10 studio album when it entered the UK Albums Chart at number 10 with first-week sales of 8,310 copies. The album also debuted at number 33 on the Japanese Oricon chart, selling 1,983 copies.

== Track listing ==
All tracks are written by Garbage.

Not Your Kind of People track listing
No.	Title	Length
1.	"Automatic Systematic Habit"	3:18
2.	"Big Bright World"	3:35
3.	"Blood for Poppies"	3:38
4.	"Control"	4:12
5.	"Not Your Kind of People"	4:57
6.	"Felt"	3:26
7.	"I Hate Love"	3:54
8.	"Sugar"	4:01
9.	"Battle in Me"	4:14
10.	"Man on a Wire"	3:07
11.	"Beloved Freak"	4:30
Total length:		42:50

Deluxe edition bonus tracks
No.	Title	Length
12.	"The One"	4:43
13.	"What Girls Are Made Of"	3:47
14.	"Bright Tonight"	4:02
15.	"Show Me"	5:14

Japanese deluxe edition bonus tracks
No.	Title	Length
12.	"The One"	4:43
13.	"What Girls Are Made Of"	3:47
14.	"Love Like Suicide"	3:49
15.	"Bright Tonight"	4:02
16.	"Show Me"	5:14

== Personnel ==
=== Garbage ===
- Shirley Manson – vocals, synth, stylophone
- Duke Erikson – guitars, synth, piano
- Steve Marker – guitars, synth, noise
- Butch Vig – drums, loops, effects

=== Additional musicians ===
- Justin Meldal-Johnsen – bass (tracks 1–8, 11–15)
- Eric Avery – bass (tracks 9, 10)
- Ruby Winslow Marker – backing vocals (track 5)
- Bo Violet Vig – backing vocals (track 5)
- Matt Chamberlain – drums (tracks 11, 14)
- Mike Fasano – drum tech
- Irina Björklund – musical saw (track 8)
- Stevie Blacke – strings (track 7)
- Matt Walker – drums (track 15)

=== Technical ===
- Garbage – production
- Billy Bush – engineering, mixing, additional production
- Butch Vig – mixing
- Emily Lazar – mastering (at The Lodge, New York City)
- Joe LaPorta – mastering (at The Lodge, New York City)

=== Artwork ===
- Ryan Corey – artwork, illustration, bone assembly
- Jeri Heiden – artwork, additional detail pics
- Autumn de Wilde – photography

== Charts ==
=== Weekly charts ===
Weekly chart performance for Not Your Kind of People
Chart (2012)	Peak position
Australian Albums (ARIA)	8
Austrian Albums (Ö3 Austria)	39
Belgian Albums (Ultratop Flanders)	28
Belgian Albums (Ultratop Wallonia)	10
Canadian Albums (Billboard)	17
Croatian Albums (HDU)	29
Czech Albums (ČNS IFPI)	35
Danish Albums (Hitlisten)	35
Dutch Albums (Album Top 100)	68
Finnish Albums (Suomen virallinen lista)	46
French Albums (SNEP)	15
German Albums (Offizielle Top 100)	15
Greek Albums (IFPI)	27
Irish Albums (IRMA)	42
Italian Albums (FIMI)	16
Japanese Albums (Oricon)	33
Mexican Albums (Top 100 Mexico)	34
New Zealand Albums (RMNZ)	32
Polish Albums (ZPAV)	39
Russian Albums (2M)	13
Scottish Albums (Official Charts)	6
Spanish Albums (Promusicae)	29
Swiss Albums (Schweizer Hitparade)	15
UK Albums (Official Charts)	10
US Billboard 200	13
US Independent Albums (Billboard)	3
US Top Alternative Albums (Billboard)	1
US Top Rock Albums (Billboard)	5

=== Year-end charts ===
Year-end chart performance for Not Your Kind of People
Chart (2012)	Position
US Independent Albums (Billboard)	50

== Release history ==
Release formats for Not Your Kind of People
Region	Date	Label	Distributor	Format(s)
Australia and New Zealand	May 11, 2012	STUNVOLUME	Liberator Music	CD, digital download (standard, deluxe), LP (deluxe)
Asia, Europe, and Latin America	May 14, 2012	STUNVOLUME	Cooperative Music	CD, digital download (standard, deluxe), LP (deluxe)
United States	May 15, 2012	STUNVOLUME	Fontana	CD, digital download (standard, deluxe), LP (deluxe)
Canada	May 15, 2012	STUNVOLUME	Universal Music	CD, digital download (standard, deluxe), LP (deluxe)
Japan	May 16, 2012	STUNVOLUME	Sony Music	CD, digital download (deluxe)
