= Steve Marker =

American musician (born 1959)

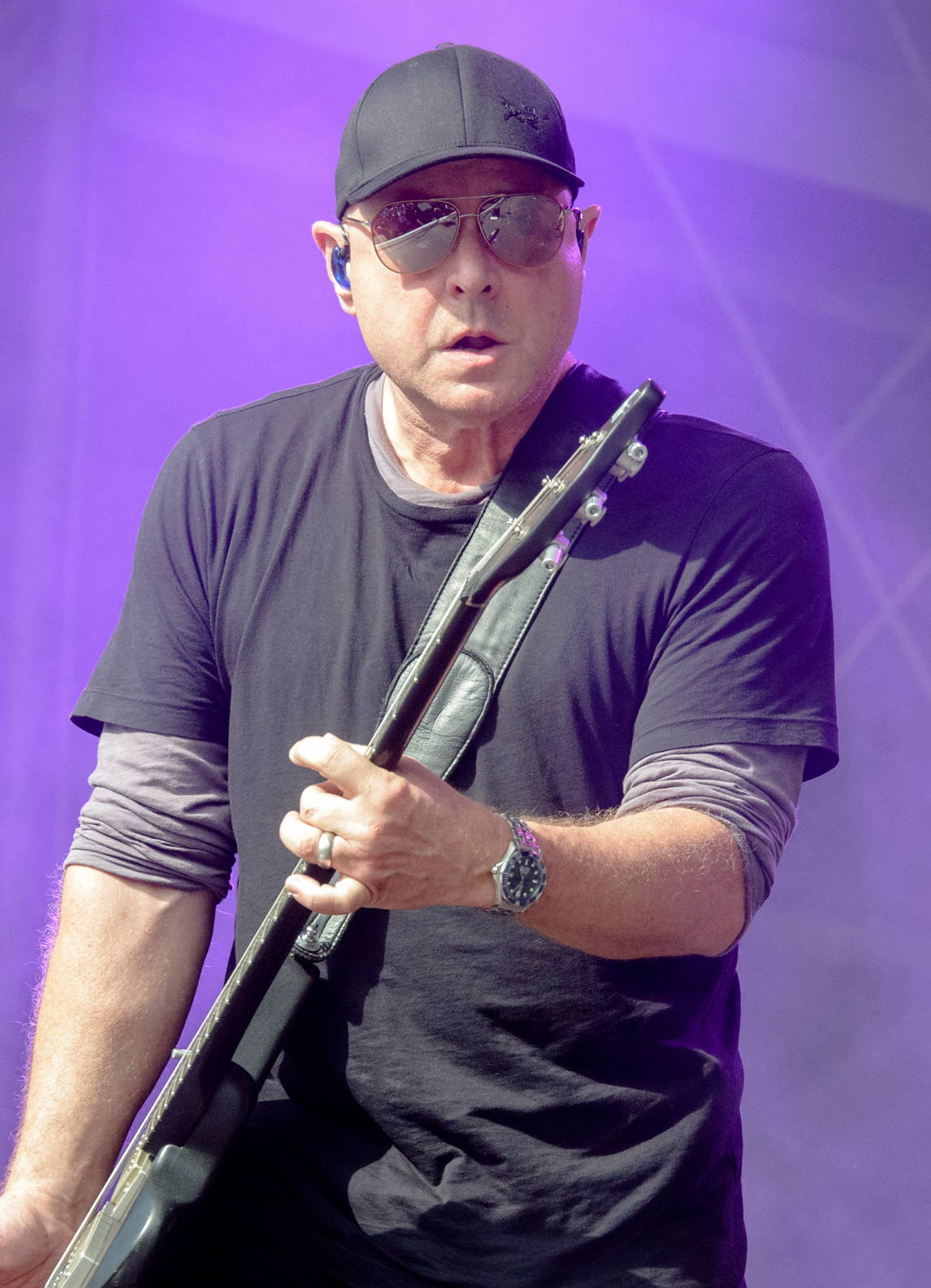
- Steve Marker performing live in 2016

Background information
- Born: March 16, 1959 (age 67); Minneapolis, Minnesota, U.S.
- Genres: Rock, alternative rock, electronic rock
- Occupations: Musician, songwriter, record producer, remixer
- Instruments: Guitar, keyboards
- Years active: 1978–present
- Labels: Geffen Records, A&E Records

Steven W. Marker (born March 16, 1959) is an American musician, songwriter, and record producer, best known as the co–founder and guitarist of the alternative rock band Garbage.

Previously an audio engineer for the band Fire Town with future Garbage members Duke Erikson and Butch Vig, Marker was responsible for the sourcing of lead singer Shirley Manson for Garbage, following the music video for "Suffocate Me" from Manson's band Angelfish being broadcast during an episode of MTV's 120 Minutes. Impressed, Marker, Vig and Erikson contacted Manson in Scotland, advocating for her to travel to the United States to lay down vocals for, what was at that time, one track. Manson would later provide all vocals for the bands breakthrough debut album Garbage (1995).

With Garbage, Marker has released eight studio albums – Garbage (1995), Version 2.0 (1998), Beautiful Garbage (2001), Bleed Like Me (2005), Not Your Kind of People (2012), Strange Little Birds (2016), No Gods No Masters (2021), and Let All That We Imagine Be the Light (2025) – as well as three compilation albums, recording the 1999 James Bond theme, and have sold over 17 million albums internationally.

== Early life ==
Steven W. Marker was born on March 16, 1959, in Minneapolis, Minnesota. He lived in Highland Park, New Jersey, Iowa City, Iowa and Mamaroneck, New York, through his childhood and teenage years, except for a year in Germany as an AFS exchange student. At the age of six his parents bought him drums, but at 12, he took up the guitar. He graduated from Rye Neck High School in Mamaroneck.

Marker graduated from the University of Wisconsin in Madison with a degree in film. At the University of Wisconsin he met Butch Vig, who played with the band Spooner which in 1979 was attempting to record a 7-inch single. Marker became interested in music production and bought a four-track reel-to-reel deck which, with Vig's microphones, became a home studio in Marker's basement. Marker and Vig also started a small label, Boat Records, to release records by Spooner and other bands they liked.

== Career ==
In 1983 Marker co-founded Smart Studios in Madison with Butch Vig and continued to engineer, produce and mix records. In 1994 he formed Garbage with Vig and Vig's bandmate in Spooner, Duke Erikson. He spotted Angelfish singer Shirley Manson in a music video on MTV's 120 Minutes, which led to her joining the group. Marker felt that Manson differed from the high-pitched and screechy female singers of the 1990s and "was more like the voices that we loved growing up, which were more Patti Smith and Chrissie Hynde – sort of that classic pop sound—maybe Dusty Springfield."

Marker said his musical style was not influenced by "the guys that played twenty-minute solos", and that he preferred "guitar parts that sort of work melodically more in a Beatles sense", and artists such as Tom Petty, Keith Richards, The Pretenders, and Robert Fripp. Marker felt that his background as a producer had helped to develop a style of playing where "you're not there to show off, to show how brilliant you are, or to draw attention to yourself. You're there to make the song work in whatever way is necessary," and the guitar "is there to serve the song".

== Personal life ==
Marker married Cindy Kahn, an attorney and development professional, in 1993. Their daughter, Ruby (born March 2000) is an actor/comedian.

== Discography ==
=== Garbage ===
Studio albums

- Garbage (1995)
- Version 2.0 (1998)
- Beautiful Garbage (2001)
- Bleed Like Me (2005)
- Not Your Kind of People (2012)
- Strange Little Birds (2016)
- No Gods No Masters (2021)
- Let All That We Imagine Be the Light (2025)

Compilation albums and EPs

- Special Collection (2002)
- Absolute Garbage (2007)
- Anthology (2022)
- Copy/Paste (2024)

== Production career ==
Steve Marker served as record producer or co-producer on the following records:

- 1984: Killdozer – Intellectuals Are the Shoeshine Boys of the Ruling Elite
- 1985: Killdozer, Snakeboy
- 1992: Gumball – Wisconsin Hayride
- 1993: The Heart Throbs—Vertical Smile
- 1995: Garbage: Garbage
- 1998: Garbage: Version 2.0
- 2001: Garbage: Beautiful Garbage
- 2005: Garbage: Bleed Like Me
- 2012: Garbage: Not Your Kind of People
- 2016: Garbage: Strange Little Birds
- 2021: Garbage: No Gods No Masters

He also engineered the following records:

- 1987: Tar Babies – Fried Milk
- 1989: Killdozer – Twelve Point Buck
- 1990: Poopshovel – I Came, I Saw, I Had A Hotdog
- 1992: L7 – Bricks Are Heavy
