= Bleed Like Me World Tour =

2005 concert tour by Garbage

- World tour by Garbage
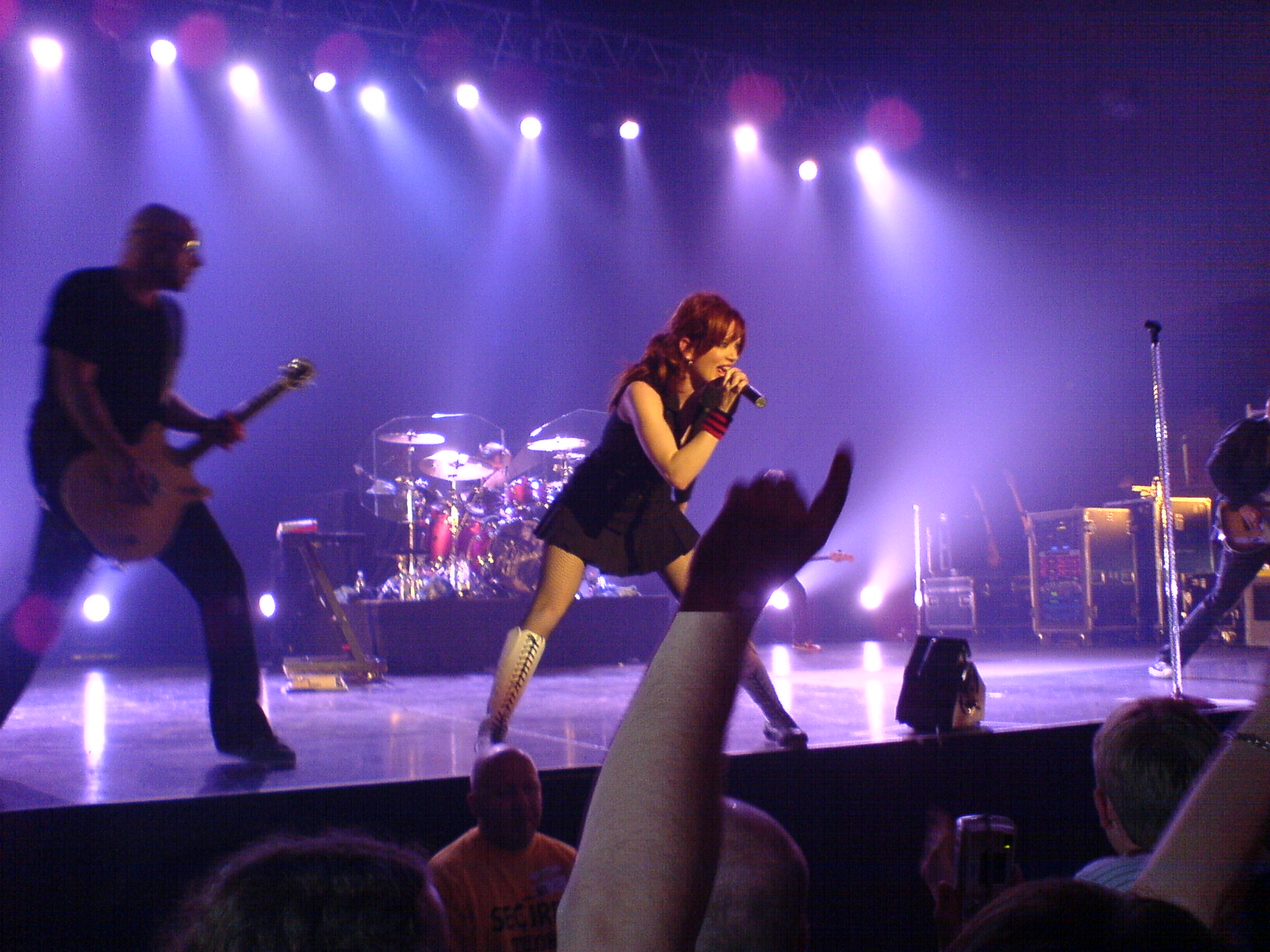
- Garbage performing onstage at the K.B. Hallen in Copenhagen, June 1, 2005
- Associated album: Bleed Like Me
- Start date: March 29, 2005
- End date: October 1, 2005
- Legs: 5
- No. of shows: 29 in Europe; 43 in North America; 7 in Australia; 78 total
- Supporting acts: The Dead 60's; Los Abandoned; TheStart; Silo; Red Jezebel
- Website: www.garbage.com

Garbage concert chronology
- Beautiful Garbage World Tour (2001–2002); Bleed Like Me World Tour (2005); Not Your Kind of People World Tour (2012–2013)

The Bleed Like Me Tour was the fourth world concert tour by American rock band Garbage, in support of their fourth album Bleed Like Me (2005). It began in Paris, France and took the band throughout North America, Europe and Australia. The tour included headline performances, rock festivals, and television and radio shows. After being initially organised on a smaller scale, the tour snowballed into bigger venues when the album and its lead single "Why Do You Love Me" became surprise hits internationally. The tour concluded in Perth, Western Australia after six months on the road and dates in France, Belgium and United Kingdom were cancelled. A statement from the band said that they had "somewhat overextended themselves".

Former Jane's Addiction bassist Eric Avery left his position as a member of Alanis Morissette's backing band to perform bass guitar for the duration of the tour. Matt Walker, who performed on the album, covered Butch Vig on drums on a few North American shows. A number of artists supported Garbage throughout the run of the tour, including The Dead 60's, JJ72, Los Abandoned, Melatonine, Silo, Red Jezebel and theSTART. During one festival appearance, Garbage performed four mash ups with Canadian electroclash musician Peaches.

Each performance on the tour was led-in by an intro-tape of Johnny Cash's posthumous cover version "Hurt". The first three legs of the tour were documented by a film crew, which was hosted as streaming video on the band's website, and as extra content on their single and album releases. More of the footage was later incorporated into a full-length documentary, Thanks for the Uhhh, Support, which was released on the band's 2007 greatest hits DVD.

== Tour itinerary ==
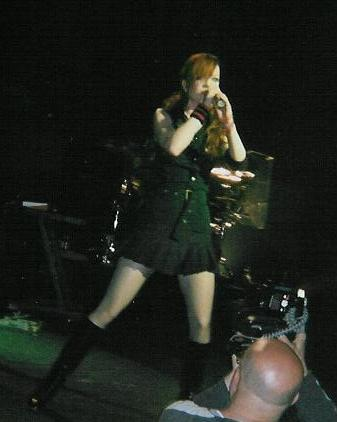
Shirley Manson performing "Bad Boyfriend" at London's Brixton Academy

Garbage began a three-week promotional tour of Europe from March 19, during which time Garbage performed live tracks on various television and radio shows, prior to performing two warm-up headline club shows in Paris (supported by local group Melatonine) and in London. The band then travelled to Germany to perform at WDR's Rochnacht televised concert, and also performed a full set for broadcast on Radio Fritz. A brief North American tour of theaters and clubs was scheduled to begin in Seattle on April 8 and end May 4 in Chicago; however the band had picked up an influenza infection while in Europe and cancelled the first show. The tour then restarted in San Francisco, heading down the Pacific coast and over to the Eastern Seaboard. The band then played two shows in Canada and then headed around the Midwest. The North American leg was eventually extended, ending on May 10 in Cleveland. Garbage then performed on the bill at the HFStival in Baltimore. For the band's Atlanta show, local radio station 99x offered a competition prize of being Garbage's tour manager for the day, including traveling with Garbage from the hotel to the venue and participating in their soundcheck.

Garbage returned to Europe to perform for on the bills of numerous rock festivals across the continent over six weeks, kicking of on June 1 in Denmark. During the run the band performed a few headline shows, such as a single date at London's Brixton Academy and at Barcelona's Razzmatazz. The band dedicated their Glastonbury performance of "Right Between the Eyes" to Australian singer Kylie Minogue who'd had to cancel her appearance on the same night after being diagnosed with breast cancer. The run ended in Austria on July 15. Garbage returned to the United States to perform at a few festivals, and made a three-date trek into Mexico where they were supported by local act Los Abandoned, and performed an entire set in a TV studio for the series SoundStage. Garbage began a four-week series of shows on August 22 in Chicago with California new wave band TheStart in support. The routing took the tour into a number of Canadian provinces, and then back south down the American west coast. The headline shows ended in Las Vegas on September 15.

It is with great regret that Garbage have decided to cancel their visit to France, Belgium and the UK in October. Having been constantly on the road since the beginning of March the band feel they have somewhat overextended themselves and have mutually decided to conclude their tour at the end of September in Australia. The band wish to extend their apologies to all Garbage fans in the territories involved and thank them profusely for their support.

— Garbage.com

Garbage performed at one last North American show, for KROQ's Inland Invasion festival before heading to Australia to perform seven shows at the end of that month with indie rock band Red Jezebel in support. The final show in Perth on October 1 marked the end of the Bleed Like Me tour. A set of European concerts were announced for October, and subsequently cancelled.

Garbage disbanded at the end of the tour for an indefinite "hiatus". Manson told the press: "We feel that this has been a really great tour and we feel that we have really muscled through... we just want to take some time off while things are really good between us". Rumours abounded that the band had split, but Manson reassured that they were not interested in breaking up. Garbage spent the following five years inactive, aside from playing a short set at a Los Angeles benefit concert, sporadic recording in 2007 for a greatest hits compilation and in 2008 for a charity tribute album. The "hiatus" ended with an official reformation in 2010.

== Tour production ==
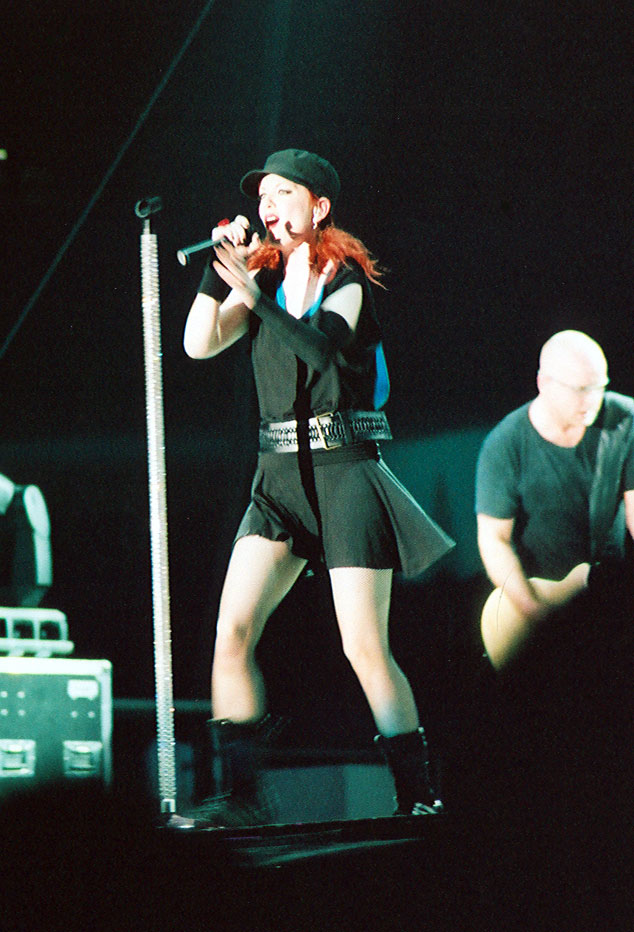
Shirley Manson and Steve Marker on-stage at San Diego's Street Scene

Rehearsals for the Bleed Like Me tour took place during February and March 2005. Pre-production tasks included sourcing and programming the sounds and samples from Bleed Like Me into the band's samplers, synths and drum triggers and configuring settings for three sets of control gear and backline racks. Slightly different arrangements of older songs were composed, particularly for the intro section of "Only Happy When it Rains", the middle 8 of "Supervixen" and the codas of both "#1 Crush" and "Shut Your Mouth". Due to having limited rehearsal time, Garbage were only able to prepare an initial setlist of around fifteen songs.

Garbage operated a "quiet stage" by removing wedges, side-fills and live backline from their stage set-up. The absence of monitors meant zero stage volume – if the P.A. was switched off the only audible elements would be Manson's voice and the cymbals; and no monitor volume – instead, the band utilised Sennheiser IEMs to monitor their live sound. The use of digital technology in the band's in-ear mixes and F.O.H. mix meant that instead of a multitude of manual settings needing restored at each soundcheck, the band's FOH and monitor engineers only had to recall the last session from the previous night. Each performance was recorded in the DSD format by taking a data dump from the mixing console at 24-bit/48k and saving the wave file onto disc for future reference.

Drum triggers were used extensively because Butch Vig's drum kits are silenced by filling the hollow interiors of the bass, snares and tom-toms with packing chips to enable the samplers to use drum sounds from studio versions. The cymbals were miked to capture their sound. To prevent the sound of the cymbals bleeding into Shirley Manson's vocal feed, the cymbals were insulated by a wrap-wround acrylic glass shield. To keep the stage lead-free, all electric and bass guitars sported wireless units. Guitar sounds were run through effects units direct to the soundboard; Manson also used a wireless mic. The band had performed in this fashion since the start of the Version 2.0 tour.

Stage lighting was dictated by low budget, using in-house lighting rigs for four different coloured backwashes and two frontwashes (a no-colour and a red wash). The audience were also kept fairly well-lit in an effort to bring the audience closer to the band onstage. The show opening was notable for using very little light, matching the intro-tape of "Hurt" and the band's "Queer" to give a soft and gentle but ominous feel to the proceedings. The band's stage backdrop featured a low-resolution LED curtain supported by four 40" high-resolution plasma TV screens. Some of the footage was manipulated from the hardware's media server, while some content was provided by music video director Sophie Muller for specific songs, including close-ups of Manson's eyes for "Why Do You Love Me".

Road crew on the Bleed Like Me tour included: production manager/lighting tech Butch Allen, FOH engineer Tom Abraham, monitor engineer Clay Hutson, drum technician Chad Zaemisch and guitar tech Billy Bush. Shows were booked by Jenna Adler at Creative Artists Agency, while the band's tour management was overseen by Gayle Fine of Q Prime.

== Opening acts ==
- The Dead 60's (North America – Leg 1)
- Los Abandoned (Mexico)
- TheStart (North America – Leg 3)
- Silo and Red Jezebel (Australia)

== Setlists ==
Europe (March 29 – April 3, 2005)

1. "Queer"
2. "Bad Boyfriend"
3. "Supervixen"
4. "Stupid Girl"
5. "Special"
6. "Hammering in My Head"
7. "Shut Your Mouth"
8. "Vow"
9. "Bleed Like Me"
10. "I Think I'm Paranoid"
11. "Only Happy When it Rains"
12. "Cherry Lips"
13. "Push It"
14. "When I Grow Up"
15. "Why Do You Love Me"

Encore:

1. "#1 Crush"
2. "Sex Is Not the Enemy"
3. "Right Between the Eyes"
North America (April 8 – May 15, 2005)

1. "Queer"
2. "Bad Boyfriend"
3. "Supervixen"
4. "Stupid Girl"
5. "Special" initially; replaced by "Sex Is Not the Enemy"
6. "Hammering in My Head"
7. "Shut Your Mouth" initially; replaced by "When I Grow Up"
8. "Vow"
9. "Bleed Like Me"
10. "I Think I'm Paranoid"
11. "Push It"
12. "Only Happy When it Rains"
13. "Why Do You Love Me"

Encore:

1. "Sex Is Not the Enemy" initially; replaced by "Metal Heart"
2. "Cherry Lips" initially; then intermittently replaced by "Run Baby Run"
3. "Right Between the Eyes"
Europe (June 1 – July 16, 2005)

Headline setlist

1. "Queer"
2. "Bad Boyfriend"
3. "Not My Idea"
4. "Stupid Girl"
5. "Sex Is Not the Enemy"
6. "Why Do You Love Me"
7. "Hammering in My Head"
8. "Cherry Lips"
9. "When I Grow Up"
10. "Vow"
11. "I Think I'm Paranoid"
12. "Run Baby Run"
13. "Metal Heart"
14. "Push It"
15. "Only Happy When it Rains"

Encore:

1. "Bleed Like Me"
2. "Special"
3. "Right Between the Eyes"

Abbreviated festival setlist

1. "Bad Boyfriend"
2. "Not My Idea"
3. "Stupid Girl"
4. "Why Do You Love Me"
5. "Hammering in My Head"
6. "When I Grow Up"
7. "Vow"
8. "I Think I'm Paranoid"
9. "Metal Heart"
10. "Push It"
11. "Sex Is Not the Enemy"
12. "Only Happy When it Rains"
13. "Right Between the Eyes"

North America (July 27 – September 17, 2005)

Initial setlist

1. "Queer"
2. "Bad Boyfriend"
3. "Supervixen"
4. "Sex Is Not the Enemy"
5. "Why Do You Love Me"
6. "Vow"
7. "Only Happy When it Rains"
8. "Stupid Girl"
9. "Run Baby Run"
10. "Boys Wanna Fight"
11. "Metal Heart"
12. "Why Don't You Come Over"
13. "Bleed Like Me"
14. "Cherry Lips"
15. "I Think I'm Paranoid"
16. "Push It"
17. "Right Between the Eyes"

Encore:

1. "Happy Home"
2. "Shut Your Mouth"
3. "When I Grow Up"

Concluding setlist

1. "Queer"
2. "Bad Boyfriend"
3. "Not My Idea"
4. "Sex Is Not the Enemy"
5. "I Think I'm Paranoid"
6. "Why Do You Love Me"
7. "Vow"
8. "Cherry Lips"
9. "Only Happy When it Rains"
10. "Metal Heart"
11. "Happy Home"
12. "Bleed Like Me"
13. "Shut Your Mouth"
14. "When I Grow Up"/"Nobody Can Win"
15. "Push It"
16. "Supervixen"
17. "Right Between the Eyes"

Encore:

1. "#1 Crush"
2. "Stupid Girl"
3. "Boys Wanna Fight"

== Tour dates ==
Date	City	Country	Venue
Europe
March 29, 2005	Paris	France	Olympia
March 30, 2005	London	United Kingdom	La Scala
April 3, 2005	Cologne	Germany	Palladium
North America
April 10, 2005	San Francisco	United States	The Warfield
April 11, 2005	Los Angeles	United States	Wiltern Theater
April 14, 2005	Atlanta	United States	The Tabernacle
April 16, 2005	Philadelphia	United States	Theater of Living Arts
April 17, 2005	Boston	United States	Avalon
April 19, 2005	New York City	United States	Hammerstein Ballroom
April 21, 2005	Washington, D.C.	United States	9:30 Club
April 24, 2005	Montreal	Canada	Métropolis
April 25, 2005	Toronto	Canada	Kool Haus
April 27, 2005	Detroit	United States	State Theatre
April 28, 2005	Milwaukee	United States	Eagles Ballroom
April 29, 2005	Minneapolis	United States	First Avenue
May 1, 2005	Madison	United States	Orpheum Theater
May 4, 2005	Chicago	United States	Metro
May 6, 2005	Nashville	United States	Ryman Auditorium
May 7, 2005	Cincinnati	United States	Madison Theater
May 9, 2005	Columbus	United States	Newport Music Hall
May 10, 2005	Cleveland	United States	Agora Theatre
May 15, 2005	Baltimore	United States	HFStival
Europe
June 1, 2005	Copenhagen	Denmark	K.B. Hallen
June 2, 2005	Amsterdam	Netherlands	Paradiso
June 4, 2005	Nürburg	Germany	Rock am Ring Festival
June 5, 2005	Nuremberg	Germany	Rock im Park Festival
June 9, 2005	London	United Kingdom	Brixton Academy
June 10, 2005	Castle Donington	United Kingdom	Download Festival
June 11, 2005	Imola	Italy	Heineken Jammin' Festival
June 14, 2005	Barcelona	Spain	Razzmatazz
June 15, 2005	Madrid	Spain	Riviera
June 16, 2005	Valencia	Spain	Ecléctic Festival
June 18, 2005	Paris	France	Europe 2 Live, Parc des Princes
June 21, 2005	Istanbul	Turkey	RockIstanbul Festival
June 24, 2005	Athens	Greece	Rockwave Festival
June 25, 2005	Évreux	France	Le Rock Dans Tous Ses États
June 26, 2005	Pilton	United Kingdom	Glastonbury Festival
June 29, 2005	Moscow	Russia	Tuborg Live And Loud
July 1, 2005	Werchter	Belgium	Rock Werchter
July 2, 2005	Belfort	France	Les Eurockéennes
July 3, 2005	Montreux	Switzerland	Montreux Jazz Festival
July 5, 2005	Český Brod	Czech Republic	Rock for People Festival
July 6, 2005	Budapest	Hungary	Petőfi Csarnok
July 8, 2005	Novi Sad	Serbia and Montenegro	EXIT Festival
July 9, 2005	Longchamps	France	Solidays Festival
July 11, 2005	Como	Italy	The Rhythm of the Lake Festival
July 15, 2005	Trenčín	Slovakia	Bažant Pohoda Festival
July 16, 2005	Wiesen	Austria	Forestglade Festival
North America
July 27, 2005	Costa Mesa	United States	Orange County Fair
July 29, 2005	San Diego	United States	Street Scene
August 3, 2005	Guadalajara	Mexico	Foro Alterno
August 5, 2005	Mexico City	Mexico	Palacio de los Deportes
August 7, 2005	Monterrey	Mexico	Auditorio Coca-Cola
August 13, 2005	Atlanta	United States	99X Downtown Rocks; Underground Atlanta
August 20, 2005	New York City	United States	AmsterJam
August 22, 2005	Chicago	United States	Vic Theater^{[a]}
August 25, 2005	Winnipeg	Canada	Burton Cummings Theater
August 27, 2005	Calgary	Canada	MacEwan Hall
August 28, 2005	Edmonton	Canada	Red's Entertainment Complex
August 30, 2005	Vancouver	Canada	Commodore Ballroom
August 31, 2005	Vancouver	Canada	Commodore Ballroom
September 2, 2005	Seattle	United States	Bumbershoot
September 3, 2005	Portland	United States	Arlene Schnitzer Concert Hall
September 6, 2005	Reno	United States	Hilton Amphitheater
September 7, 2005	Santa Cruz	United States	The Catalyst
September 10, 2005	San Francisco	United States	Warfield Theater
September 11, 2005	Fresno	United States	Rainbow Room
September 12, 2005	Phoenix	United States	Dodge Theater
September 14, 2005	San Diego	United States	SOMA
September 15, 2005	Las Vegas	United States	Hard Rock Casino
September 17, 2005	Devore	United States	KROQ Inland Invasion
Australia
September 21, 2005	Canberra	Australia	Royal Theatre
September 23, 2005	Sydney	Australia	Hordern Pavilion
September 24, 2005	Brisbane	Australia	Convention Centre
September 26, 2005	St Kilda	Australia	Palais Theatre
September 28, 2005	Melbourne	Australia	Forum Theatre
September 29, 2005	Adelaide	Australia	Adelaide Festival Centre
October 1, 2005	Perth	Australia	Burswood Theatre

Cancellations and rescheduled shows

April 8, 2005	Seattle	United States	Paramount Theatre	Cancelled
October 6, 2005	Kortrijk	Belgium	Xpo	Cancelled
October 8, 2005	Montpellier	France	Le Zénith	Cancelled
October 9, 2005	Lyon	France	Le Transbordeur	Cancelled
October 10, 2005	Paris	France	Le Zénith	Cancelled
October 12, 2005	Manchester	United Kingdom	The Apollo	Cancelled
October 14, 2005	Cardiff	United Kingdom	Arena	Cancelled
October 16, 2005	Portsmouth	United Kingdom	Guildhall	Cancelled
October 17, 2005	London	United Kingdom	Hammersmith Apollo	Cancelled
October 20, 2005	Birmingham	United Kingdom	National Indoor Arena	Cancelled
October 22, 2005	Glasgow	United Kingdom	Academy	Cancelled
October 23, 2005	Edinburgh	United Kingdom	Usher Hall	Cancelled

- Notes

a Butch Vig was absent from this concert due to the death of his mother; he was replaced by Matt Walker.

== Promotional performances ==
Garbage performed on a number of TV shows and radio stations during the tour to promote Bleed Like Me and its singles. While some were fully set up live band performances, a number of them were lip synced when the host studios were not able to accommodate the band's live equipment. One televised event, T4 on the Beach was a three-hour UK-televised concert featuring a multitude of current bands and pop artists performing short sets on the Weston-super-Mare beachfront: due to the quick turnaround time of the event, each act had to lipsynch their tracks. Later, in Trieste, Italy, Garbage performed a full live six-song set for Isle of MTV in the city's Piazza Unità d'Italia, this show was broadcast across the continent. In late August, Garbage performed a full-length live show at WTTW Studios, Chicago in front of a studio audience for the series Soundstage. The show aired on PBS stations a year later on July 6, 2006.

Date	Show	Set
March 23, 2005	XFM	"Why Do You Love Me", "Vow" (acoustic set)
March 24, 2005	20h10 pétantes	"Why Do You Love Me"
March 25, 2005	Trafic.musique	"Why Do You Love Me"
March 26, 2005	cd:uk	"Why Do You Love Me", "Bleed Like Me"
March 26, 2005	Napster Live	"Why Do You Love Me", "Bleed Like Me"
March 27, 2005	Popworld	"Why Do You Love Me"
March 28, 2005	Album de la Semaine	"Sex is Not the Enemy", "Right Between the Eyes", "Bleed Like Me", "I Think I'm Paranoid", "Why Do You Love Me"
March 31, 2005	Friday Night with Jonathan Ross	"Why Do You Love Me"
April 1, 2005	Top of the Pops	"Why Do You Love Me", "Bleed Like Me"
April 4, 2005	Radio Fritz	"Queer", "Bad Boyfriend", "Supervixen", "Stupid Girl", "Special", "Hammering in my Head", "Shut Your Mouth", "Vow", "Bleed Like Me", "I Think I'm Paranoid", "Push It", "Only Happy When it Rains", "Why Do You Love Me", "Cherry Lips"
April 20, 2005	Comp'd	"Why Do You Love Me", "Only Happy When It Rains", "Bleed Like Me", "I Think I'm Paranoid", "Sex is Not the Enemy"
April 21, 2005	DC101	"Bleed Like Me, "Why Do You Love Me" (acoustic set)
April 23, 2005	MusiquePlus	"Vow", "I Think I'm Paranoid", "Bleed Like Me", "Why Do You Love Me"
May 3, 2005	WXRT	"I Think I'm Paranoid", "Why Do You Love Me", "Bleed Like Me", "Only Happy When it Rains" (acoustic set)
May 10, 2005	Xtreme Sessionz	"Why Do You Love Me", "Bleed Like Me", "Only Happy When it Rains" (acoustic set)
May 12, 2005	The Late Show	"Bleed Like Me"
June 19, 2005	T4 on the Beach	"Sex is Not the Enemy", "Why Do You Love Me"
July 14, 2005	Isle of MTV	"I Think I'm Paranoid", "Stupid Girl", "Sex is Not the Enemy", "Run Baby Run", "Why Do You Love Me", "Only Happy When it Rains"
July 25, 2005	Live@LAUNCH	"Bleed Like Me" (acoustic)
July 28, 2005	The Tonight Show	"Bleed Like Me"
August 23, 2005	Soundstage ^{[a]}	"Queer", "Bad Boyfriend", "Boys Wanna Fight", "Sex is Not the Enemy", "I Think I’m Paranoid", "Push It", "Why Do You Love Me", "Vow", "Stupid Girl", "Only Happy When It Rains", "Right Between The Eyes", "Happy Home"
September 8, 2005	Ex’pression Session	"Only Happy When it Rains" (acoustic set)
September 20, 2005	Rove Live	"Why Do You Love Me"

== Critical reception ==
Garbage's performance on the Bleed Like Me tour met with a mostly-positive appraisal from music critics; some gave a more favourable reception to their shows – and Shirley Manson's stage presence and persona – than they did for the album. Reviewing Garbage's "comeback" show at London's Scala, Catherine Yates of Kerrang!, felt that "[the band] are still finding their feet after so long away" but noted that with their backcatologue that "when they chose to, this is a band who can crush a crowd". A week later, Kelefa Sanneh of The New York Times praised Manson's "appealingly feline performance" but was not positive about the band's new material. In a review of their Brixton Academy concert for The Guardian, Ian Gittins wrote "Garbage's motor has long been the chippy insecurity of singer Shirley Manson, and the dexterity with which they translate this neurosis into in-your-face defiance. This defiance was plentiful in Brixton, where lukewarm reviews for their latest album did not stop the resurgent group scorching through a fiery and frequently inspirational set". XFM's John Ford wrote of the band's Glastonbury performance "a revitalised Garbage pummel the Pyramid Stage as the sun goes down. [There was] a bizarre moment where Manson was actually dry humping a full-size latex sex doll. Weird, captivating and down-right good fun."
