= Run Baby Run (Garbage song) =

Single by Garbage

from the album Bleed Like Me
- B-side: "Honeybee"; "Never Be Free"; "Badass"
- Released: July 10, 2005
- Recorded: 2003–2004
- Studio: Smart Studios, (Madison, Wisconsin)
- Genre: Alternative rock
- Length: 3:58
- Label: A&E
- Songwriter(s): Garbage
- Producer(s): Garbage

Garbage singles chronology
"Sex Is Not the Enemy" (2005)	"Run Baby Run" (2005)	"Tell Me Where It Hurts" (2007)

"Run Baby Run" is a rock song by American alternative band Garbage from their fourth studio album, Bleed Like Me (2005). Described by Garbage guitarist Duke Erikson as a call to not-conforming, the track originated from an idea he had brought into the album sessions. "Being expected to go through life to behave a certain way, do certain things," Erikson explained later, "I think "Run Baby Run" is a plea to run from that. Run with your life, take it wherever it takes you."

Band lead and primary lyricist Shirley Manson called the song a rebuff to classic fairy tales, such as Cinderella and Sleeping Beauty. "It's about encouraging myself and through that encouraging others just to sort of engineer your own life, engineer your own happiness," Manson explained. "I think for a long time I was under the illusion that life was like a storybook. I think particularly when you're a female, you're imbued with... this idea that somebody's gonna come along and fix your life. I came to the realization that actually nobody's gonna fix your life for you, you have to do it yourself."

"Run Baby Run" was released as the second single from Bleed Like Me in Europe and Australia. In North America however, outsider-anthem "Bleed Like Me" had already followed up "Why Do You Love Me" as second single, while in the United Kingdom, protest song "Sex Is Not the Enemy" was released in place of "Run Baby Run", and thus shared the same b-sides. Garbage shot music videos for all three singles with Sophie Muller.

== Background ==
The genesis of "Run Baby Run" was in place by the end of 2003 at the band's home base of Smart Studios in Madison, Wisconsin. Duke Erikson had brought the idea for "Run Baby Run" into the sessions; drummer Butch Vig later described it as a song that was "really labored over". The song originally began with a heavy metal riff which ended up turning into a Cure-like verse part. Garbage tried speeding up the tempo, changing the groove, rewriting the vocal melodies and verse lyrics to support the chorus, which they were happy with. By the end of 2004, the band had essentially re-written the song, scrapping all the original verses. Bass guitar parts were performed by Justin Meldal-Johnson, while drums were performed by Matt Walker, as Vig wanted to control the sound of some of the songs from "behind the glass" during the album sessions, which were engineered by Billy Bush. The final recording was mixed by Vig at Smart Studios and mastered by Emily Lazar at The Lodge in New York City.

On the song's lyrical subject matter, Shirley Manson explained, ""Run Baby Run" is about trying to engineer your own peace of mind and being unafraid to make changes in your life in order to try and facilitate that." In a separate piece she added, "[It's] about escape and engineering your own path in life. We're all too guilty of thinking that peace, love and healthiness are things that we're all just given".

On April 17, 2005, during the first North American run of Bleed Like Me tourdates, Garbage debuted "Run Baby Run" live onstage at the Avalon in Boston.

== Release ==
Warner Music serviced "Run Baby Run" to European radio stations from May 15, and confirmed the physical single release on May 20. The initial European release date was scheduled for June 20 to sync with local tourdates. On June 25, Garbage performed "Run Baby Run" as part of a six-song set for the Isle of MTV festival, broadcast Europe-wide from Trieste, Italy , The eventual release date fell back to August 1, when a CD maxi was made available in stores. In Germany, "Run Baby Run" peaked at number 97.

At the start of June, Garbage's Australian label Festival Mushroom serviced "Run Baby Run" to their radio stations, where it was the number-two most added track. The retail single was released on 10 July as a CD maxi. Despite the top twenty placing of the prior single, "Run Baby Run" debuted at number 47, spending six non-consecutive weeks in the chart.

In the United Kingdom, "Run Baby Run" was fancied to follow "Sex Is Not The Enemy" and thus by the end of June had received a number of adds to UK radio and TV playlists; and a tentative September 12 retail date. On August 25, Garbage cancelled their UK tour and announced their intent to go "on hiatus"; the October 24 single release for "Run Baby Run" was quietly postponed and then cancelled. The music video was pulled from television. In North America, Shirley indicated to that "Run Baby Run" or "It's All Over But the Crying" were still being considered by Geffen for single release in the United States. A rumour surfaced in at the end of the year that a reworked version of "Run Baby Run" would be released on March 20, 2006, upfront of Absolute Garbage greatest hits compilation, but did not happen.

== Music video ==
Shirley Manson walking the streets of Istanbul in the "Run Baby Run" video.

Over the weekend of May 31, 2005, Shirley Manson and Sophie Muller filmed the music video for "Run Baby Run" in London, Paris, Berlin and Istanbul. By June 8, the video was ready to air. Locations the pair filmed in include within Charles de Gaulle International Airport, on the streets of Pigalle and on Line 5 of the Paris Métro Viaduc d'Austerlitz crossing over the Seine (France); outside the Olympiastadion, DIW and Haus der Demokratie und Menschenrechte buildings, and on the platforms of the Mohrenstraße and Neu-Westend stations on the Berlin U-Bahn (Germany); and inside Istanbul's Hotel Pera Palas, Haydarpaşa Terminal train station, the Çemberlitaş Hamamı Turkish baths, throughout the Beyoğlu district, around the Blue Mosque and looking towards the Galata Tower over the Bosphorus strait from the Golden Horn ferry terminals. (Turkey).

The "Run Baby Run" video was exclusively streamed online at the band's website from June 10, before being serviced to music channels on June 15. The "Run Baby Run" video was uploaded to VEVO in 2015.

== B-sides ==
The "Run Baby Run" single release was backed with b-sides "Honeybee" and "Never Be Free", both recorded during the album sessions for Bleed Like Me. Butch Vig described "Honeybee" as "Neil Young-esque, with a druggy feel", while Manson described it as "pretty dark and twisted. It's a lusty, yearning moan". "Honeybee" featured drums performed by Matt Walker, while "Never Be Free" credited John5 with guitar. All three tracks were written and produced by Garbage, although "Never Be Free" may have originally been a John Lowery co-write. Producer James Michael may have also worked on the track at one point. An acetate of an early version of "Never Be Free" leaked from Chrysalis Music Group in 2003, but the track did not end up on the internet. The "Run Baby Run" maxi-single also featured a demo version of "Badass" (once titled "Teach Me Tonight"), that had been left unfinished from abandoned album sessions in October 2003. Exclusive to the "Run Baby Run", "Badass" leaked onto the Internet a month before the single was issued.

== Track listing ==
- Australia CD maxi single
- European CD maxi single
1. "Run Baby Run" – 3:58
2. "Honeybee" – 4:02
3. "Never Be Free" – 4:28
4. "Badass (October 2003 Ruff Demo)" – 3:15

== Critical reception ==
"Run Baby Run" was generally very well received by contemporary pop music critics, a number of whom, including Dan Martin of NME, who commented Bleed Like Me's strong opening half: "A spleen-tingling big rock rollercoaster" while singling out "Run Baby Run". A number of reviewers picked up on The Cure influence on "Run Baby Run": in an album preview, Rolling Stone felt that song's "tender, dreamy verses" brought to mind "Just Like Heaven", while Chuck Arnold of People wrote "Garbage smooths out the rough stuff with the melodic pop appeal of "Run Baby Run", an exhilirating rush that brings to mind The Cure". In the Rolling Stone album review, felt the song recreated the 80s new wave sound better than efforts from bands like Kasabian and Bloc Party: "Surrounded by a black forest of power-chord distortion, Manson pleads and prays like Deborah Harry atop a bouncing, throaty guitar riff that New Order would envy." The New York Daily News also picked up on the New Order sound, commenting that the band had given the bass guitar "the best hook". Leander Williams, of Time Out New York, wrote "Garbage's adventures in Wall of Sound multi-tracking make what's been called a return to basics impossible. What's interesting is how the band tops the guitar and explosive glitches of present day rock with the Blondie-tronic keyboard riffs of new wave pop on "Run Baby Run"... amongst others". Peter Murphy, of Hot Press, described "Run Baby Run" as one of the band's most positive songs; "[It] glows with compassion, forgiveness and self-acceptance."

== Credits and personnel ==
Production

- Recorded and produced by Garbage
- Recorded at Smart Studios in Madison, Wisconsin
- Engineer: Billy Bush
- Mixed by Butch Vig at Smart Studios
- Mastered: Emily Lazar (The Lodge, New York City)
- Mastering assistant: Sarah Register (The Lodge)

Additional musicians

- Justin Meldal-Johnsen – bass guitar
- Matt Walker – drums

Other personnel

- Art direction: Big Active
- Design and montage: Mat Maitland at Big Active

== Charts ==
Chart (2005)	Peak position
Australia (ARIA)	47
Germany (GfK)	97

== Release history ==
Region	Date	Format	Label
Australia	July 10, 2005	CD maxi single	Festival Mushroom
Germany	August 1, 2005	CD maxi single	A&E
