= Strange Little Birds Tour =

2016 concert tour by Garbage

- World tour by Garbage
- Promotional poster
- Location: Europe; North America; Oceania; South America
- Associated album: Strange Little Birds
- Start date: May 16, 2016
- End date: December 17, 2016
- Legs: 7
- No. of shows: 81
- Supporting acts: The Pearl Harts; Kristin Kontrol; Cigarettes After Sex; The Temper Trap
- Website: www.garbage.com

Garbage concert chronology
- 20 Years Queer (2015); Strange Little Birds Tour (2016); Rage and Rapture Tour (2017)

The Strange Little Birds Tour was the seventh concert tour by American rock band Garbage, in support of their sixth studio album, Strange Little Birds (2016). The tour began on May 16, 2016, in Irvine, California, and ended on December 17, 2016, in Lima, Peru.

Garbage's touring line-up is augmented by Eric Avery on bass guitar. Due to illness, Butch Vig was replaced by Matt Walker for European and North American shows at the start of the run and later Eric Gardner. Garbage have been supported by a number of hand-picked opening acts on this tour; including Tiny Little Houses, Olympia, Tash Sultana, The Pearl Harts, Kristin Kontrol and Cigarettes After Sex.

== Tour dates ==
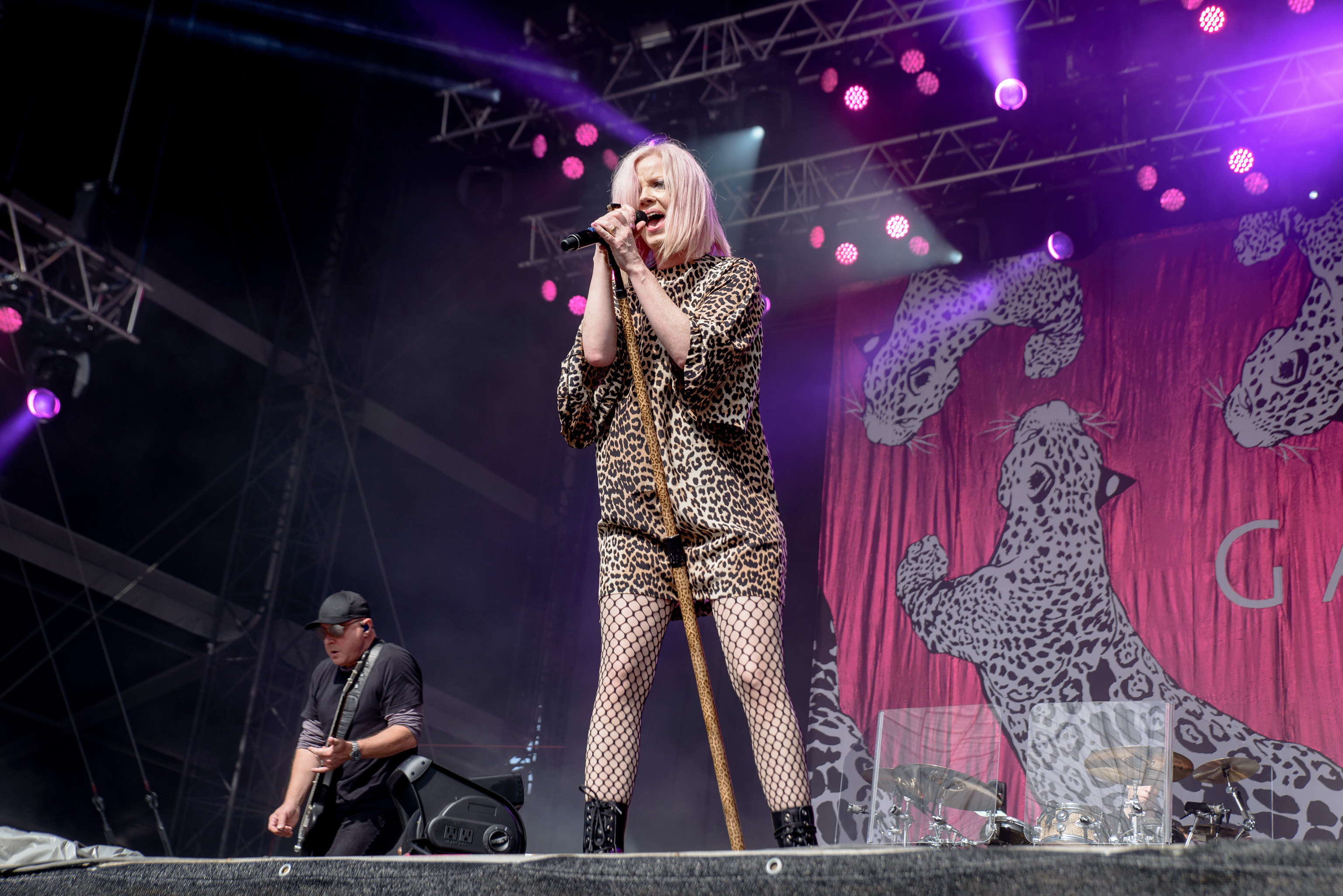
Garbage performing at the Rockavaria in Munich.

Date	City	Country	Venue
United States
May 14, 2016	Irvine	United States	KROQ Weenie Roast; Irvine Meadows Amphitheater
Europe Support: The Pearl Harts (on headline shows)
May 24, 2016	Reims	France	La Cartonnerie
May 26, 2016	Dortmund	Germany	Rock im Revier
May 27, 2016	Frankfurt	Germany	Women of the World Festival; Alte Oper
May 28, 2016	Munich	Germany	Rockavaria
May 30, 2016	Amsterdam	Netherlands	Paradiso
May 31, 2016	Hollerich	Luxembourg	Den Atelier
June 1, 2016	Crans-près-Céligny	Switzerland	Caribana Festival
June 3, 2016	Lyon	France	Le Radiant
June 5, 2016	Grenoble	France	La Belle Electrique
June 7, 2016	Ljubljana	Slovenia	Center urbane kulture Kino Šiška
June 8, 2016	Milan	Italy	Fabrique
June 10, 2016	Nickelsdorf	Austria	Nova Rock Festival
June 13, 2016	London	United Kingdom	Troxy
June 14, 2016	Nottingham	United Kingdom	Rock City
June 16, 2016	Madrid	Spain	Mad Cool Festival, Caja Mágica
North America Support: Kristin Kontrol (on headline shows)
June 18, 2016	Chicago	United States	WKQK Piqniq; Hollywood Casino Amphitheatre
July 6, 2016	Milwaukee	United States	Summerfest
July 7, 2016	Minneapolis	United States	Skyway Theater
July 8, 2016	Papillion	United States	Sumtur Amphitheater
July 10, 2016	Kansas City	United States	Uptown Theater
July 12, 2016	St. Louis	United States	The Pageant
July 13, 2016	Tulsa	United States	Brady Theater
July 15, 2016	Indianapolis	United States	Old National Center
July 16, 2016	Detroit	United States	The Fillmore Detroit
July 17, 2016	Columbus	United States	PromoWest Fest
July 19, 2016	Knoxville	United States	The Mill & Mine
July 20, 2016	Nashville	United States	Ryman Auditorium
July 22, 2016	Atlanta	United States	The Tabernacle
July 23, 2016	Charlotte	United States	Fillmore Charlotte
July 25, 2016	Richmond	United States	National Theater
July 27, 2016	Sayreville	United States	Starland Ballroom
July 28, 2016	Boston	United States	House of Blues
July 30, 2016	Philadelphia	United States	Fillmore Philadelphia
July 31, 2016	Baltimore	United States	Rams Head Live!
August 1, 2016	New York City	United States	Summerstage
August 3, 2016	Washington, D.C.	United States	Lincoln Theatre
Europe
August 6, 2016	Rheinfelden	Switzerland	River Nights Festival
August 8, 2016	Lokeren	Belgium	Lokerse Festival
August 10, 2016	Luhmühlen	Germany	A Summer's Tale Festival
August 12, 2016	Saint-Brieuc	France	Fêtes du Bruit
August 14, 2016	Riga	Latvia	Kubana Festival
August 16, 2016	Binyamina	Israel	Zappa Shuni
August 17, 2016	Binyamina	Israel	Zappa Shuni
August 20, 2016	Bodø	Norway	Parkenfestivalen
North America Support: Cigarettes After Sex
September 4, 2016	Guadalajara	Mexico	Diana Theatre
September 5, 2016	Monterrey	Mexico	Monterrey Arena
September 7, 2016	Mexico City	Mexico	Mexico City Arena
September 9, 2016	Houston	United States	Revention Music Center
September 10, 2016	Dallas	United States	South Side Ballroom
September 11, 2016	San Antonio	United States	Majestic Theatre
September 14, 2016	Aspen	United States	Belly Up
September 15, 2016	Denver	United States	Fillmore Auditorium
September 16, 2016	Salt Lake City	United States	The Complex
September 18, 2016	Portland	United States	Roseland Theater
September 19, 2016	Seattle	United States	Paramount Theatre
September 22, 2016	Las Vegas	United States	The Foundry at SLS
September 23, 2016	Irvine	United States	93.1 JACK FM's 11th Irvine Meadows Amphitheater
September 24, 2016	San Francisco	United States	The Masonic
October 20, 2016	Ventura	United States	Ventura Theater
October 21, 2016	Los Angeles	United States	Hollywood Forever Cemetery
October 27, 2016	Phoenix	United States	Arizona State Fair
Europe
November 2, 2016	Florence	Italy	Teatro Obihall
November 3, 2016	Padua	Italy	Gran Teatro Geox
November 5, 2016	Paris	France	Salle Pleyel
November 7, 2016	Oslo	Norway	Sentrum Scene
November 8, 2016	Odense	Denmark	Posten
November 9, 2016	Copenhagen	Denmark	Vega
November 11, 2016	Brussels	Belgium	Cirque Royal
November 13, 2016	Kyiv	Ukraine	Stereo Plaza
November 15, 2016	Saint Petersburg	Russia	A2 Club
November 17, 2016	Moscow	Russia	Yotaspace
November 18, 2016	Moscow	Russia	Yotaspace
November 19, 2016	Yekaterinburg	Russia	Tele-club
Oceania A Day on the Green tour with The Temper Trap
November 24, 2016	Melbourne	Australia	Regent Theatre
November 26, 2016	Yarra Valley	Australia	Rochford Wines
November 27, 2016	Adelaide	Australia	Leconfield Wines
November 29, 2016	Perth	Australia	Kings Park and Botanic Garden
December 2, 2016	Sydney	Australia	Hordern Pavilion
December 3, 2016	Hunter Valley	Australia	Bimbadgen Winery
December 4, 2016	Brisbane	Australia	Sirromet Wines
South America
December 10, 2016	São Paulo	Brazil	Tropical Butantã
December 11, 2016	Rio de Janeiro	Brazil	Circo Voador
December 13, 2016	Buenos Aires	Argentina	Estadio Luna Park
December 14, 2016	Santiago	Chile	Teatro Caupolicán
December 15, 2016	Santiago	Chile	Teatro Caupolicán
December 17, 2016	Lima	Peru	VIVO X EL ROCK Festival

=== Cancelled shows ===
June 4, 2016	Montereau-Fault-Yonne	France	Festival de Montereau Confluences	Cancelled
December 1, 2016	Wollongong	Australia	WIN Entertainment Centre	Cancelled

== Setlist ==
The tour set list omits less well known songs for festival appearances. Songs introduced during the run include "So Like A Rose" (from Beautiful Garbage) performed in both London and St. Louis as a tribute to "Blood For Poppies" music video director Matt Irwin. At the beginning of July, debut album track "Supervixen" was added to the set, along with "Shut Your Mouth", while "Subhuman", "Queer", "Milk", "Androgyny" and "Beloved Freak" returned to the set on occasion over the following two months. During September, Strange Little Birds tracks "Night Drive Loneliness" and "Magnetized" were performed in concert, "So We Can Stay Alive" has also been sound-checked.

During this tour, Shirley has been quoting lines from the Beyoncé songs "Sorry" and "Don't Hurt Yourself" alongside lyrics from Marianne Faithfull's "Why D'Ya Do It", Patti Smith Group's "Revenge" and Siouxsie and the Banshees' "Drop Dead/Celebration" on "Vow". In addition to interpolating from "Talk of the Town" by The Pretenders on "Special", Shirley has also quoted lines from their song "Kid" and their cover of "I Go to Sleep".

Reims (May 24, 2016)

1. "Sometimes"
2. "Empty"
3. "Stupid Girl"
4. "Special"
5. "Blood for Poppies"
6. "Bleed Like Me"
7. "My Lover's Box"
8. "Even Though Our Love is Doomed"
9. "Control"
10. "#1 Crush"
11. "I Think I'm Paranoid"
12. "Battle In Me"
13. "Only Happy When It Rains"
14. "Why Do You Love Me"
15. "The Trick Is to Keep Breathing"
16. "Blackout"
17. "Push It"
18. "Vow"
19. "Automatic Systematic Habit"
1. "A Stroke of Luck"
2. "Sex Is Not the Enemy"
3. "Cherry Lips"
