= Flicker and Flames =

EP by The Silents
- Released: 6 March 2006
- Recorded: November 2004 – January 2005
- Studio: Blackbird Sound, Perth
- Genre: Garage, alternative, psychedelic rock
- Length: 19:46
- Label: Rubber Records/EMI
- Producer: Dave Parkin; The Silents

The Silents chronology
Flicker and Flames (2006)	23 (2007)

Professional ratings
Review scores
Source	Rating
Faster Louder	(not rated)
Australian Music Online	(not rated)

Flicker and Flames is the debut extended play from Australian psychedelic rockers, the Silents, released on 6 March 2006 by Rubber Records through EMI. The EP was co-produced by Dave Parkin (Red Jezebel) and the group. Its lead track and debut single, "Nightcrawl", received significant airplay across Triple J networks.

== Track listing ==
All songs written by Benjamin Stowe, Sam Ford, James Terry and Alex Board.

1. "Nightcrawl" – 2:50
2. "High Blues" – 3:08
3. "Gypsy" – 2:00
4. "Little People" – 2:57
5. "Mind in a Blanket" – 8:51
