= Revelations (Red Jezebel album) =

Studio album by Red Jezebel
- Released: 7 June 2004
- Recorded: April 2003–February 2004
- Studio: Blackbird Sound Studios, Perth, Western Australia
- Length: 41:37
- Label: Sunday Ride Records; MGM Distribution
- Producer: Dave Parkin; Paul Wood; Red Jezebel

Red Jezebel chronology
| Revelations (2004) | How I Learnt to Stop Worrying (2007) |

Revelations is the debut album from Australian rock music group Red Jezebel, released on 7 June 2004 on Sunday Ride Records via MGM Distribution.

== Background and recording ==
Revelations was recorded between April 2003 and February 2004 at Blackbird Sound Studios in Perth, Western Australia, and was produced by Dave Parkin alongside the band. The album featured the song, "Wide Open Spaces", which received extensive airplay on national youth broadcaster Triple J. The songs on the album range from pure guitar-based rock, "Trust in Us", to psycho-county, "Dale", to softer acoustic based ballads such as "New Revelations" and "See Through Dress", both of which feature the vocals of Susannah Legge (The Hampdens). The album was the last release to feature guitarist Chris Hayes and the band's original line-up, Hayes was replaced by the album's producer, Dave Parkin.

== Track listing ==
1. "You're Making Me Nervous" – 4:42
2. "Devil's Advocate" – 3:37
3. "New Revelations" – 4:35
4. "Dale" – 1:40
5. "Heart In The Sun" – 4:14
6. "See Through Dress" – 3:22
7. "Trust In Us" – 3:37
8. "For Money And Pleasure" – 3:21
9. "Ocean Blue Eyes" – 2:44
10. "Wide Open Spaces" – 3:41
11. "Demons" - 5:38
12. "Angels" - 3:34

== Personnel ==
- Paul Wood - guitar, vocals, loops and samples, harmonica
- Alex Hyman - drums, backing vocals
- Mark Cruickshank - bass, harmonica
- Chris Hayes - guitar, backing vocal

=== Additional musicians ===
- Susannah Legge (The Hampdens) - vocals ("Devil's Advocate", "See Through Dress")
- Andrew MacDonald - vocals ("Ocean Blue Eyes")
- Emma McClughan - piano, organ, harmonica ("Devil's Advocate", "New Revelations", Heart In The Sun", "See Through Dress', "For Money And Pleasure", "Demons")
- Steve MacCallum - percussion, shenanigans ("Ocean Blue Eyes")
