= Honey bee (disambiguation) =

A honey bee is any bee of the genus Apis.

Honey bee or honeybee may also refer to:

== Arts and entertainment ==
=== Music ===
- "Honeybee", 2005 song by Garbage from their singles "Sex Is Not the Enemy" and "Run Baby Run"
- "Honey Bee", 1974 song by Gloria Gaynor
- "Honeybee", 2019 song by the Head and the Heart from Living Mirage
- "Honey Bee", 2008 song by Madrugada from Madrugada
- "Honey Bee", 1951 song by Muddy Waters
- "Honeybee", 1971 song by New Birth from Ain't No Big Thing, But It's Growing
- "Honeybee" (song), by Olivia Rodrigo, 2026
- "Honey Bee" (song), by Blake Shelton, 2011
- "Honeybee", 2011 song by Steam Powered Giraffe
- "Honey Bee", 1984 song by Stevie Ray Vaughan & Double Trouble from Couldn't Stand the Weather
- "Honey Bee", 1994 song by Tom Petty from Wildflowers
- HoneyBee (band), Japanese band featuring Yuria

=== Film ===
- The Honey Bee, 1920 American film
- Honey Bee (2013 film), Indian Malayalam-language film by Jean Paul Lal
  - Honey Bee 2, its sequel
  - Honey Bee 2.5
- Honey Bee (2018 film), Canadian drama

=== Television ===
- "Honey Bees", an episode of Ben & Holly's Little Kingdom
- "Honey Bees", an episode of My Pet and Me
- "Honey Bees", an episode of Wanda and the Alien

== Other uses ==
- Honeybee, Kentucky, place in the United States
- Honeybee Robotics, spacecraft technology and robotics company
- Beecraft Honey Bee,1952 homebuilt aircraft
- Howland H-2 Honey Bee, 1986 homebuilt aircraft
- Datsun Honey Bee, North American version of the Nissan Sunny car model

== See also ==
- Honey to the B, 1998 Billie Piper album
  - "Honey to the Bee", Billie Piper song
- Bee (disambiguation)
