= The Silents =

Australian rock band

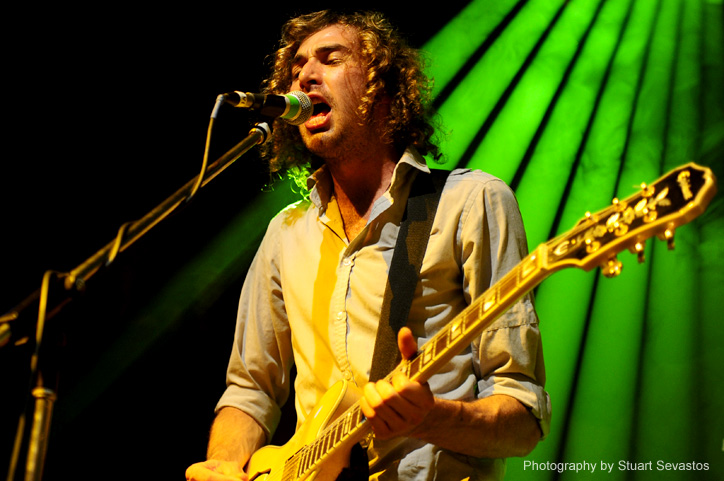
- 2010 performance by The Silents at the Metropolis in Fremantle

Background information
- Origin: Perth, Western Australia, Australia
- Genres: Psychedelic rock; psychedelic pop; neo-psychedelia
- Years active: 2002–present
- Labels: Rubber; Ivy League
- Spinoffs: Pond
- Members: Jamie Terry; Lloyd Stowe; Sam Ford; Michael Jelinek
- Past members: Alex Hayes
- Website: Official Website

The Silents are an Australian psychedelic rock band from Perth, Western Australia.

== Biography ==
Lloyd Stowe and Jamie Terry began writing and recording songs in 2002, heavily influenced by early sixties psychedelic and beat music. They then began looking for a rhythm section with similar rock’n’roll influences, however with little success. In September 2003, Stowe watched friend Sam Ford’s band perform at a local Perth hotel and after the show asked if both he and drummer Alex Hayes would be interested in joining him and Terry to form a band. In early December 2003 the Silents recorded a three track demo.

The name 'The Silents' is taken from Simon and Garfunkel's haunting folk ballad, "The Sound of Silence". The name was also influenced by The Silence, the original name of Marc Bolan's band 'John’s Children', one of the first psychedelic bands in the UK.

On 15 April 2006 their debut EP Flicker & Flames, recorded with Dave Parkin (Red Jezebel), was released with Rubber Records nationally, with the lead single "Nightcrawl" receiving large amounts of airplay on Triple J and alternative/community radio across Australia. They toured extensively with The Exploders in 2006, and appeared as the house band on Rove Live.

The Silents were also nominated 'Most Promising New Act' at the 2006 WAMi Awards.

In April 2007 The Silents signed to Ivy League Records following which they toured nationally with The Vines and the Red Riders.

In May 2007 the band commenced recording new tracks for their debut album, which was mixed in Sunset Studios California by Doug Boehm (Starsailer, Guided by Voices, Sahara Hotnights). On 3 November 2007 the band released the first song from their debut album, "23", in the form of an EP. It has already received significant airplay on Triple J. On 29 March 2008 the band released its debut album, Things to Learn.

In November 2008, Hayes was replaced by new drummer Mike Jelinek, Hayes went on to form a project named Hyla. The following year was a rather challenging one for the band, as they parted ways with the Ivy League label as well as their management, choosing to independently re-establish the sound of the band with the new lineup, as well as work on new material for their second LP. The album, entitled "Sun A Buzz", was recorded in an isolated part of the South West of Australia and in Blackbird Sound Studios in Perth in late 2009.

After the album was recorded, the band brought on board new management and embarked on a national tour with Tame Impala in May 2010.

== Members ==
- James Terry – guitar, vocals, keyboards (2003–present)
- Lloyd Stowe – guitar, vocals (2003–present)
- Sam Ford – bass, vocals (2003–present)
- Alex Hayes – drums (2003–2008)
- Michael Jelinek – drums (2008–present)

== Discography ==
=== Albums ===
- Things to Learn - Ivy League Records (IVY060) (29 March 2008)
- Sun A Buzz - Independent (SLNTS001) (25 June 2010)

=== Singles ===
- "Little Girl Lost" - Ivy League Records (2008)

=== EPs ===
- Flicker and Flames - Rubber Records (RUB212) (6 March 2006)
- 23 - Ivy League Records (IVY056) (29 September 2007)

=== Compilation Records ===
- Kiss My WAMi 2006 - "High Blues" (2006)
