= Things to Learn =

Studio album by The Silents
- Released: 29 March 2008 (Australia)
- Recorded: 2007 at Blackbird Sound Studio, Perth
- Genre: Garage rock, Alternative, Psychedelic
- Length: 40:41
- Label: Ivy League Records
- Producer: Dave Parkin

The Silents chronology
23 (2007)	Things to Learn (2008)	Sun a Buzz (2010)

Singles from Things to Learn
- 1. "Little Girl Lost" Released: 2 March 2008

Things to Learn is the debut album released by Australian band The Silents. It was released on 29 March 2008 through Ivy League Records. It features the singles "Nightcrawl", "23" and "Little Girl Lost".

The album was mixed by Doug Boehm at Sunset Sound in Los Angeles.

== Track listing ==
All songs written by Lloyd Stowe, James Terry, Sam Ford, Alex Board, except where noted.

1. "Things To Learn" - 2:50
2. "Ophelia" - 3:18
3. "23" - 2:31
4. "Tune for a Nymph" - 3:01
5. "Turn Black" - 2:28
6. "Nightcrawl" - 2:49
7. "Little Girl Lost" - 3:34
8. "Devils" - 3:38
9. "See The Future" - 5:58
10. "Astral Child" - 3:41
11. "Generation Space" - 2:58
12. "Bruised Sky" (Lloyd Stowe, Alex Board) - 3:54
