= Bleed Like Me (song) =

Single by Garbage

from the album Bleed Like Me
- Released: May 9, 2005
- Recorded: 2003–2004
- Studio: Smart Studios, Madison, Wisconsin
- Genre: Alternative rock
- Length: 3:59 (album version) 3:32 (radio edit)
- Label: Geffen
- Songwriter: Garbage
- Producer: Garbage

Garbage singles chronology
"Why Do You Love Me" (2005)	"Bleed Like Me" (2005)	"Sex Is Not the Enemy" (2005)

"Bleed Like Me" is a song by American rock band Garbage and the title-track of their fourth studio album (2005). It was released as the album's second single in North America by Geffen Records imprint Almo Sounds on May 9, 2005. It reached number 27 on the Billboard Modern Rock Tracks chart. Club mixes of the track sent the remix package into the top ten of the Billboard dance chart. The song received positive reviews from critics, who highlighted it as the centrepiece of the album.

In the United Kingdom, despite initially being scheduled as the second single, "Sex Is Not The Enemy" was released in place of "Bleed Like Me", while in Europe and Australia, the single was replaced with "Run Baby Run". Garbage shot music videos for all three singles with director Sophie Muller.

== Composition ==
"Bleed Like Me" was written and recorded during sessions at the band's home base of Smart Studios in Madison, Wisconsin. Over the course of 2003, Garbage had been struggling to find a direction for their fourth album. Vocalist and primary lyricist Shirley Manson had been struggling with writer's block, while recovering from throat surgery to remove a cyst on her vocal cords. Manson found herself inspired after attending a screening of coming-of-age movie Thirteen, having shared similar experiences in her own teenage life. However, by October, the band's disagreements escalated into a three-month long split and cessation of all recording activity.

After regrouping in Los Angeles to work with John King on some songs at the beginning of 2004, Garbage were prepared to return to Madison to overcome the difficulties that had derailed the previous years sessions. "We came up with a whole slew of songs in the first week... Shirley wrote the lyrics to "Sex is Not the Enemy" and "Bleed Like Me"... suddenly words started pouring out of her. " Butch later recalled, "Because we almost lost the band, there was a certain sense of desperation when we got back in the studio. Duke and Steve really upped the ante with their guitar playing. Shirley's lyrics got much more topical socially and politically."

Vig came up with the song title and brought in the acoustic guitar intro to the band. He didn't get much response until Manson had developed lyrics for it, four vignettes about people she knew in her childhood and adult life, as well as an additional verse about J.T. LeRoy singing "I Will Survive" at karaoke, which Manson simply liked the idea of. Over time the band began to build the track up, making it orchestral in some parts. Garbage worked to keep the song simple, just by building the "hypnotic" guitar riff up and repeating it. Manson had an idea to add multi-tracked elements to make her vocal sound like a girls choir. The "You should see my scars" overdubs were recorded just as the song was nearing the mixing stage. Bass guitar parts were performed by Vig. The album sessions were engineered by Billy Bush. The final recording was mixed by Vig at Smart Studios and mastered by Emily Lazar at The Lodge in New York City.

On the song's lyrical matter, Manson explained, "It's about a search for empathy. We can forget so easily that people are the same regardless of their sexuality, religion, colour, or moral values". The use of the vignettes as a lyrical device emphasised the point that Manson was making that "everybody has a story to tell" but that it was important for people to remember that everybody else is carrying their own baggage too. "I think we're all guilty of believing that our problems are more important than somebody elses." Garbage felt that the song became so significant to their interpersonal situation that they eventually named the album Bleed Like Me after the song.

On March 28, 2005, "Bleed Like Me" was first performed for a live audience at a five-song promo set for a Canal+ Album de la semaine broadcast. The following night, on the opening night of the Bleed Like Me tour, the song debuted onstage at Olympia in Paris. In 2016, "Bleed Like Me" was brought back into the set for the Strange Little Birds tour and again for 2019 tourdates.

== Release ==
In the United Kingdom, "Bleed Like Me" was scheduled as the follow-up single to "Why Do You Love Me", and as such, promotional performances of the song were pre-recorded for Top of the Pops and CD:UK. One promo TV set of both songs, for Napster Live, was broadcast. After the release of the album, Warner Music decided to focus on "Sex Is Not the Enemy" as follow-up instead.

In North America, Geffen serviced a radio edit and a clean version of "Bleed Like Me" to Modern Rock and Triple-A radio stations on May 9, although seven alternative stations jumped the add date. Four days later, Garbage performed "Bleed Like Me" as musical guest on the Late Show with David Letterman. In its first week tracking, "Bleed Like Me" gained a further fourteen station adds and debuted on the Modern Rock Tracks chart at number 39. At the end of July, Garbage returned from touring European festivals to perform up and down North America's west coast. On July 28, the band performed "Bleed Like Me" on The Tonight Show and an acoustic version of "Bleed Like Me" for Yahoo! Music.

== Music video ==
Garbage as medical personnel in the "Bleed Like Me" video.

Directed by Sophie Muller from a concept developed in collaboration with Manson, the music video for "Bleed Like Me" was filmed on April 11 at the disused Linda Vista Hospital in Boyle Heights, Los Angeles. During the filming, CNN interviewed the band and broadcast behind-the-scenes footage of the video. Muller wanted the video "to have a Hitchcockian feel," referencing his works Marnie, The Birds, and Psycho. "Shirley sees the video being about love and the nurse as a caring specialist," Muller explained, "I thought it was a brilliant concept but what I didn't want was a sexy nurse wearing pink like a 50 Cent video." Manson chose graphic colours to make the visual image as powerful as the song's subject matter, being particularly delighted with the green tiled walls adorned with red crosses within the location.

The video begins with Manson, as a nurse, reading medical records onto a dictation machine. She is then accompanied by Erikson, Marker, and Vig, as doctors, as they view patients on their rounds. Manson is then seen preparing a ward for use – opening curtains, preparing beds and medicine. Manson breaks into a file storage, where she reads her own medical file (placed in front of director Sophie Muller's file), and later speaks to her therapist, but she is startled by a raven. In the hospital's educational room, Manson stands at a lectern, which she pushes away to perform under disco lights. The video ends with Erikson, Marker and Vig watching Manson through a two-way mirror - she is their patient. Manson finishes her dictation and ejects the cassette from the machine.

Manson's nurse costume was provided by British costume designer Michele Clapton. Using Nurse Ratched from One Flew Over the Cuckoo's Nest as a starting point, Manson's character was dressed as a twist on 1950s European nurse outfits and made-up to evoke Helmut Newton's "strong yet vulnerable" photography subjects. A sequence where Shirley's sleek chignon hairstyle is unpinned and grows out on-screen referenced a 1983 photo of musician Danielle Dax taken by Linda Rowell, a British rock photographer who documented the London goth scene of the time.

On May 8, 2005, the "Bleed Like Me" music video was playlisted by Fuse, and a week later by MTVU and VH1. In 2006, the video was Sophie Muller's "Director of the Year" nominee at the 15th Annual MVPA Awards; Muller won "Adult Contemporary Video" for "Cool" (Gwen Stefani) instead. The "Bleed Like Me" music video was included on Garbage's 2007 greatest hits DVD Absolute Garbage and uploaded to VEVO in 2012.

== Remixes ==
Eric Kupper produced a club mix and dub version of "Bleed Like Me" which Geffen pressed to 12" vinyl and distributed to dance music DJs. The "Bleed Like Me (Eric Kupper mixes)" debuted at number 38 on the Hot Dance Music/Club Play chart on the week of August 13. By September, the Eric Kupper mixes reached the top ten, eventually peaking at number 6 by the end of the month. Ralphi Rosario presented his own "Bleed Like Me" remix to Geffen which was rejected for commercial release. On August 28, 2005, the Ralphi Rosario remix leaked onto the internet.

== Critical reception ==
"Bleed Like Me" received a largely positive reception from critics, contrasted to the mixed reactions of the Bleed Like Me album. Johnny Sharp of Kerrang! felt that "Bleed Like Me" "almost seems to be mocking [Manson's] own tendency towards self-obsession"; while their Emma Johnston, in a review for the album wrote that "Bleed Like Me" was the "most striking" song of the set, adding that it was "the most poignant, empathic reflection of self-abuse since Manic Street Preachers' "4st 7lb" – over a gorgeous cello strewn background, [Shirley shows her] battle scars, worn with pride, there to show that she survived". Bev Lyons of Daily Record (Scotland) wrote that the song was "simplicity itself, dark and introspective" and was the stand-out track from the album, favourably comparing the track to Lou Reed's "Walk on the Wild Side", as did Guitar magazine's Jenny Knight. Isabel Mohan of Heat complimented Shirley's "seductive" voice as "better than ever" (however two years later the same publication's Laila Hassan described "Bleed Like Me" as "a little tiresome and dreary" in a review of Absolute Garbage).

== Credits ==
Musicians

- Shirley Manson – vocals, electric guitar
- Butch Vig – drums, bass guitar, electric guitar
- Duke Erikson – electric guitar
- Steve Marker – acoustic guitar, electric guitar

Production

- Recorded and produced by Garbage
- Recorded at Smart Studios in Madison, Wisconsin
- Engineer: Billy Bush
- Mixed by Butch Vig at Smart Studios
- Mastered: Emily Lazar (The Lodge, New York City)
- Mastering assistant: Sarah Register (The Lodge)

Other personnel

- Art direction: Big Active
- Design and montage: Mat Maitland at Big Active

== Charts ==
Chart performance for "Bleed Like Me"
Chart (2005)	Peak position
US Hot Modern Rock Tracks (Billboard)	27
US Hot Dance Music/Club Play^{[A]} (Billboard)	6

A Credited as "Bleed Like Me (E. Kupper remixes)"
