= The Hampdens =

Australian indie pop band

- Origin: Perth, Western Australia, Australia
- Genres: Indie pop
- Years active: 2002–2010
- Labels: Independent/MGM; Sony; Rubber; Warner
- Past members: Gavin Crawcour; Jon Elder; Jordy Hewitt; Julian Hewitt; Susannah Legge; Andrew McDonald; Justin Smith
- Website: Official website

The Hampdens were an Australian indie pop band formed in Perth in 2002. They issued a studio album, The Last Party, in May 2008 before disbanding in 2010. During their career they performed in Australia and in London.

== Biography ==
The Hampdens were formed in Perth in 2002 with a line-up of Gavin Crawcour on bass guitar, guitar, percussion and clarinet and Julian "Jules" Hewitt on piano, electric piano [Rhodes], bass guitar, Hammond organ, synthesiser, saxophone and percussion. Their name is from the fictitious, Hampden College, in Donna Tartt's 1992 novel, The Secret History, which describes a group of college kids embroiled in a pagan cult. Crawcour and Hewitt were soon joined by Susannah Legge on lead vocals and Andrew McDonald on lead guitar and backing vocals.

During 2002 they lived in a beach house where "they wrote, recorded and rehearsed for three months." Their debut independent extended play, Brightness Falls, was released in August 2003. The EP's six tracks were produced by Dave Parkin (Red Jezebel), at Blackbird Sound Studios, who also provided electric guitar and percussion. For the recording they were joined by Jordy Hewitt on backing vocals, Justin Smith on violin and session drummers, Mark Milentis and Tim Stacey, who replaced by Jon Elder on drums for live performances.

K. P. from Forte reviewed their debut EP and opined that, "[their] music often masks some dark lyrics, but whether it's funk, drums 'n' bass, or folk pop, every time Legge's voice appears its magic time!" The Sunday Telegraph's reviewer declared "this music sends tingles up your spine... [they] defy the nu-rock trend with their lush electronica and superb songs... Intelligent music with intelligent lyrics." The first run sold out within two weeks – a second run was pressed and subsequently sold out.

The group toured Australia with gigs in Perth, Sydney and Melbourne. They appeared on Francis Leach's programme, The Deep End, on ABC Radio National in October 2003. After a month-long residency at Melbourne's Duke of Windsor Hotel the band travelled to London to perform at the Barfly and the Metro in November. The Hampdens have played with Ben Lee, Evermore, John Mayer, Ray LaMontagne, Thirsty Merc, Sarah Harmer, george, Rob Thomas, and Missy Higgins.

The success of the Brightness Falls led to their signing with Sony Music Australia, which released their follow up EP, Even World, on 12 April 2004. Its seven tracks were produced by Parkin again and mixed at Metropolis Studios in Melbourne; Parkin also provided guitar, slide guitar and percussion; Stacey supplied drums. Anton S Trees of FasterLouder felt it provided "Haunting melodies and dreamy soundscapes. Two lead singers (one female, one male). Warm, jazzy keys and chilled-out drumbeats." In Music and Media's Christie Eliezer cited Cream magazine's reviewer, "If Perth is the new Paris, then the Hampdens are the new Air". Eliezer added that their EP included "references of writers, photographers, washed-up moguls, and falling ASX stock tickers atop crumbling concrete skyscrapers."

Their third EP, So Young It Hurts, had six tracks and was released in August 2005 on Rubber Records. It was mixed and recorded by United Kingdom producer Eden, who had worked as side-kick for Nellee Hooper (Madonna). The EP reached No. 16 on the ARIA Hitseekers Singles Chart. By that time the group were based in Melbourne and had trimmed down to a three-piece: Crawcour, Jules Hewitt and Legge. They supported National Youth Week in 2007, where their EP was described as "set against the sound of melodic electronica and haunting vocals."

The band finished recording their debut album, The Last Party, in New York City. They enlisted the services of Victor Van Vugt (Beth Orton, Nick Cave and PJ Harvey) to produce the album, with fellow Melburnian, Matt Lovell (Silverchair, Eskimo Joe) as sound engineer. The album's lead single, "Generation Y", was released in July 2007, which peaked at No. 51 on the ARIA Singles Chart, No. 29 on the Top 100 Physical Singles Chart and No. 1 on the Hitseekers Singles Chart. Foster noticed that "The world Legge presents – partly with an eye on hitting the zeitgeist with song titles like ‘Generation Y' – is jaded, partied out and numb, with refuge found in dreams and sleep and the search for love." The song is about beauty and hope, about white Converse sneakers and beating hearts in dark clubs, about a new generation for whom Kurt Cobain is nostalgia and CK one is a cultural relic, about going back to the town you grew up in and burying your hands in the soil. "Generation Y" was co-written by the trio with Julian Hamilton of the Presets.

In early 2008 the Hampdens filmed a music video for the album's second single, "Asleep on the Lawn", in Essendon West. The Last Party appeared on 17 May 2008 via Warner Music Australasia, which peaked at No. 14 on the ARIA Hitseekers Albums Chart. It provided "themes that are interwoven into their songs deal with loss, hope and re-enchantment. Much of their music focuses on youth and the issues they face today." Robert Forster of The Monthly felt its "sound is good. There's silky bass, programmed drums, and live drums that sound like programmed drums; synths either squelch and squeak in late-'90s fashion or are banked and layered in '80s mode, and there's tinkling piano and guitar. It's a lush, compact, Europop-influenced production."

Sounds of Oz' Lauren Katulka opined that "This isn't your dance til your feet hurt and drink til you puke kind of party. Instead it evokes chilled out cocktail parties, with some mellow jazz in the background and some good conversation. It's one of those sleeper albums, which may not immediately grab you on the first listen. Instead it wraps around you slowly, and becomes richer with each and every listen." It was followed by another single, "Miami", in June. An album track, "Belljar", received an Honourable Mention at the International Songwriting Competition of 2008 in the Performance category.

In May 2009 they issued a four-track EP, The Croupier on Nettwerk Records. The trio disbanded in the following year to pursue solo careers. Legge provided lead vocals for a track on the second album by Sydney artist, Matt Ridgway, Sunday Morning (October 2011). Crawcourt and Hewitt co-wrote tracks for Melbourne-based synth-pop group, Clubfeet on their two albums, Gold on Gold (July 2010) and Heirs and Graces (January 2013).

== Band members ==
- Gavin Crawcour – bass guitar, guitar, programming, percussion, clarinet
- Jordy Hewitt – backing vocals
- Julian Hewitt – piano, rhodes, keyboards, programming
- Susannah Legge – lead vocals
- Andrew McDonald – guitar, acoustic guitar, backing vocals
- Justin Smith – violin
- Jon Elder – drums

== Discography ==
=== Albums ===
List of albums, with selected details
Title	Details
The Last Party	Released: May 2008; Format: CD; Label: Warner Music Australia (5144227392)

=== Extended plays ===
List of EPs, with selected details
Title	Details
Brightness Falls	Released: August 2003; Format: CD; Label: The Hampdens International (HIPL001)
Even World	Released: April 2004; Format: CD; Label: Sony Music (5162002000)
So Young It Hurts	Released: August 2005; Format: CD; Label: Rubber (RUB198)
The Croupier	Released: 28 May 2009; Format: CD; Label: Nettwerk

=== Singles ===
List of singles, with selected chart positions
Title	Year	Peak chart positions	Album
Title	Year	AUS	Album
"Croupier"	2003	—	Brightness Falls
"The Hype"	2004	—	Even World
"Generation Y"	2007	51	The Last Party
"Asleep on the Lawn"	2007	—	The Last Party
"Miami"	2008	— (Note: "Miami"did not enter the ARIA Top 100 Singles Chart, but peaked at number 23 on the Australia Digital Singles Chart.)	The Last Party
