= Tell Me Where It Hurts =

Tell Me Where It Hurts may refer to:

- "Tell Me Where It Hurts" (Garbage song), 2007
- "Tell Me Where It Hurts" (The Real Milli Vanilli song), 1991
- Tell Me Where It Hurts (film), a 1974 TV movie directed by Paul Bogart
