= Planet Nightclub =

Defunct music venue in Perth, Western Australia

Coordinates: 31.9284°S 115.8523°E

The Planet Nightclub was a live music venue in Perth, Western Australia. The venue's heyday was in the mid-late 1990s before closing down and reopening as Dollhouse strip club.

== Venue ==
The small to mid-sized venue had a number of attributes that distinguished it from other similarly sized live music pubs and clubs in Perth. A dedicated stage area, fronted by small dance floor, surrounded by an elevated viewing area in a room with a low ceiling made for a unique and intimate atmosphere favourable for large and medium-sized crowds.

The Planet's location in North Perth was somewhat removed from other nightlife venues, but this was compensated by the proximity of a 24-hour McDonald's restaurant that was a popular meeting point and post-gig feeding station.

== Importance and legacy ==
The importance and legacy of the Planet Nightclub is most heavily reflected in the musical groups that performed there, often in the early stage of their careers. After a period of relative national obscurity, the Perth indie-rock scene re-emerged in the mid-late 1990s. The eminent Perth bands that led the march to national recognition at this time were Ammonia and Jebediah.

Much of their formative periods in the public eye were spent on the Planet's stage. Two other bands to reach national success, Red Jezebel and Eskimo Joe, were thrust into the public eye after their performances at the 1997 WA final of the National Campus Band Competition, held at the Planet.

The Planet can be considered to be an important cultural touchstone of the period, not only because of the role it played in the rise of the more successful Perth bands of the time, but also through the plethora of other quality indie bands that enjoyed as much success on a local level, including: Yummy Fur (aka 6 Mile High), Humbug, Header, Effigy, Flanders and Thermos Cardy.

The Planet also regularly hosted Australian touring bands during their formative years (such as Regurgitator and Powderfinger) and other popular bands of the period (such as Custard, Pollyanna and Sidewinder). International acts also played at the Planet, such as Ash, Weezer, They Might Be Giants and Bikini Kill.

The Planet has now largely been succeeded by venues such as the Rosemount Hotel and the Amplifier Bar.
