= Bleed Like Me =

Studio album by Garbage
- Released: April 11, 2005
- Recorded: March 2003 – December 2004
- Studios: Smart (Madison, Wisconsin); Sound City (Van Nuys, California); The Boat and GrungeIsDead (Silver Lake, California)
- Genres: Alternative rock; post-grunge; electro-rock
- Length: 45:00
- Label: Geffen
- Producers: Garbage; John King

Garbage chronology
Special Collection (2002)	Bleed Like Me (2005)	Absolute Garbage (2007)

Singles from Bleed Like Me
- 1. "Why Do You Love Me" Released: April 5, 2005; 2. "Bleed Like Me" Released: May 3, 2005; 3. "Sex Is Not the Enemy" Released: June 13, 2005; 4. "Run Baby Run" Released: July 10, 2005

Bleed Like Me is the fourth studio album by American rock band Garbage. It was released worldwide on April 11, 2005, through Warner Music imprint A&E Records, with a North American release on Geffen Records the following day. For this album, the band chose a straight rock sound reminiscent of their live performances instead of the electronica that permeated their previous album Beautiful Garbage (2001). The first recording sessions took place in March 2003, but were mostly unproductive due to passive aggression between band members and a general lack of direction. As they struggled to record the album, Garbage quietly split for four months starting in October 2003. They reunited under producer John King in Los Angeles and, following a guest appearance by Dave Grohl on "Bad Boyfriend", they found a renewed focus on production. Garbage recruited drummer Matt Walker and bassist Justin Meldal-Johnsen for new recording sessions and completed the album by late 2004.

Following critical praise and high chart positions for its lead single "Why Do You Love Me", Bleed Like Me had a strong opening week globally, debuting in the top five in eight countries including the United Kingdom, Australia, and the United States.

== Background ==
Garbage's third album Beautiful Garbage had been promoted by a fourteen-month world tour, which culminated in a run of North American shows co-headlined with No Doubt and supported by The Distillers in October and November 2002. Before the tour started, the band spent two weeks at Smart Studios—their recording studio in Madison, Wisconsin—to write new material for their upcoming album. Upon completion of the tour in December 2002, the group took some time off; Shirley Manson returned to her native Scotland, while Butch Vig completed production work on albums by AFI and Jessy Moss. The band regrouped in February 2003 to perform "Pride (In the Name of Love)" at a MusiCares tribute to U2 frontman Bono. Immediately after the event, they returned to Madison to continue working on their follow-up record.

== Recording and production ==
=== Initial recording and band breakdown ===
On the first day in the studio, Garbage composed a new track, "Right Between the Eyes", in 30 minutes. Other tracks written during the early sessions were "Hangin' with the Bitches" and "Never Be Free" (with John 5). Vig said that the quick start made the band feel optimistic and gave the impression that the album would be completed as rapidly as in six months, but "[the album] took a slow spiral downhill". Recording for the album was halted during the summer when Manson underwent surgery to remove a cyst on her right vocal cord, forcing her to recuperate until August 2003. On September 10, a backhoe careened into the outer walls of Smart Studios, causing extensive damage. Both Garbage and the band Paris, Texas had been working on their albums in the studio. The sessions were permeated by passive-aggressive tensions and an overall lack of artistic focus. According to Vig, "there were a lot of personal arguments and we couldn't agree on songs". Manson suffered writer's block and had trouble writing lyrics, and Vig did not like the way the songs sounded. The drummer said that the group frequently argued during production, and that the entire band almost quit. Duke Erikson said that nobody could agree about the music's direction, and the band was on the verge of breaking up. He said, "When you lose that common bond of the music, you've got nothing". Eventually, the group suffered "a complete and utter band meltdown" in October, leading the band members splitting and taking a break from the sessions.

Vig left the studio and returned to Los Angeles. Over the Christmas period, he encountered excited Garbage fans eager to hear about the album's progress. Not wanting to disappoint them, he disclosed some song titles to them; after this encounter, he realized that the band still had a future. During the break, Vig met Dave Grohl of Foo Fighters in a party, and casually asked if he would perform drums on a Garbage track, "Bad Boyfriend", as Vig had been frustrated with the song's existing drum track.

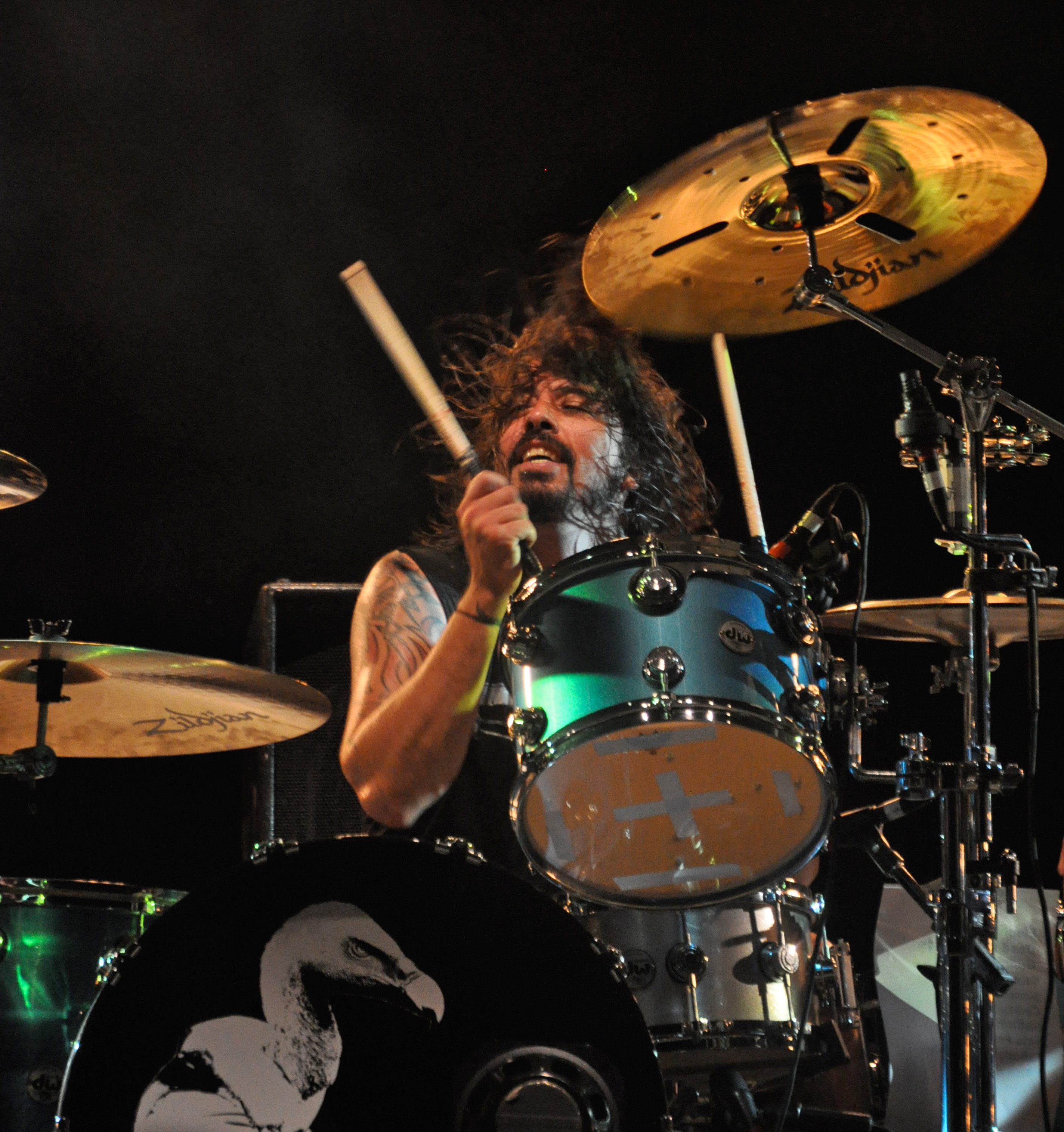
The band credited the participation of Dave Grohl, who played drums in "Bad Boyfriend", as a motivator in getting the album finished.

=== Regrouping ===
At the beginning of 2004, the band decided to try to salvage the album, taking their management's suggestion to work with an external producer for the first time. The musicians also decided that neutral territory would be beneficial, and went to Los Angeles. John King, one half of the production duo Dust Brothers, was enlisted to produce "Bad Boyfriend". Drummer Matt Chamberlain and bassist Justin Meldal-Johnsen were hired to perform on the songs. The recordings were completed in King's studio The Boat and Sound City in Los Angeles. Towards the end of the recording sessions, Grohl spent a day performing on drums for "Bad Boyfriend". The band said his performance was "raising the bar" for the record, and Vig said that Grohl "brought a different energy level to the song", which Erikson and Steve Marker tried to follow with their guitar playing. This influenced most of the songs that followed; the musicians wanted the songs to be "scrappy and primal sounding".

The experience with King, despite only resulting in the completion of one track, "Bad Boyfriend", gave the band perspective and direction. Manson said that because the band members still had problems speaking to each other, King could not get much work out of the band, so they realized that they needed to work out their differences and was the catalyst for the band getting back together and working harmoniously. Vig said that the tensions led the band members to become "burned out on each other", and that reuniting made them feel able to play "fast and furious—as if our lives depended on it". Manson overcame her writer's block and began to inject political slants into her lyrics, matching them with some new material the band wrote immediately after the King sessions; both "Metal Heart" and "Boys Wanna Fight" referenced the 2003 Invasion of Iraq. Despite a plan to record some material with producer Tony Hoffer, the band decided to complete the rest of the album themselves. Erikson later said, "It was kind of seductive to think that maybe someone else [would] solve all of our problems, but in the end you gotta do it yourself".

Feeling that previous album Beautiful Garbage seemed fractured, the band decided to use their live sound; Vig said that he wanted "the pumping energy that all the best raw rock records have". The band decided that their fourth album would have a straightforward rock sound, instead of a reliance upon electronica and computer interventions. The musicians composed separately at their home studios, sending each other tracks through e-mail and couriers, and the band returned to Wisconsin to finish the album. Bleed Like Me emerged from a collage of samples and loops, and this time the sound was simpler. Erikson said that rather than production, they depended on the songs. Vig opted to focus on the production duties and leave the drums to guest musicians such as Grohl, whom he considered better at the instrument than him. He also played more guitars on the album, which he found liberating. As a result, drummer Matt Walker also played on several tracks on the album, while Meldal-Johnsen played bass guitar. Most of Manson's vocals were recorded at Vig's home studio, GrungeIsDead.

On October 18, the band began mixing the album. Some songs were mixed several times; "Sex Is Not the Enemy" was re-recorded three times during the mixing process, "Right Between the Eyes" was recalled from mastering twice, and the band included live strings at the last minute on "Happy Home". While the project's working title was Hands on a Hard Body, after the 1997 documentary of the same name, when Manson announced the album's release in November 2004, she confirmed that it would be titled Bleed Like Me. By December 6, 2004, the album was officially completed. It was mastered in New York City; the initial mastering was completed on December 15, 2004, and the final master was ready for January 6, 2005.

== Composition ==
"We've almost gone backward in this album. It's getting us back to a more primal sound—guitars, bass, drums and Shirley's voice".

Bleed Like Me is a departure from the heavily electronic music of previous albums Version 2.0 and Beautiful Garbage in favor of a basic alternative rock sound. Vig said that while the band tried to figure out a new sound for the record, they "went back to getting great sounds from guitars". The band tried a more spontaneous approach; Manson did most of her singing in the first take and the drums were recorded in a way "that everything was not perfectly balanced—and not so electronic". The band members tried to translate the energy of the band's live performances onto the album; Marker said that the album showed that above all, Garbage is "a loud rock band". Vig still thought that some of the songs resembled the band's earlier material, such as "Metal Heart", with "a lot of weird electronics that Steve and Duke did, as well as some pretty gnarly guitar."

"Why Do You Love Me"
Sample of lead single "Why Do You Love Me", described as "a melodic Phil Spector girl group sped-up-fast kind of song" based around a metal riff.

The lyrics of Bleed Like Me talk about relationships and political themes; Manson said, "the last few years ... have been very worrying and you'd have to be dead to not have some kind of political view at the moment", and that after many years being insecure about articulating her feelings writing lyrics, she found herself confident that she could express her ideas and sentiment of being "very out of kilter with a lot of the common thoughts of today" in her music. "Boys Wanna Fight" criticizes world affairs and "Sex Is Not the Enemy" is about moral guardians, inspired by the outcry caused by Janet Jackson's wardrobe malfunction at the 2004 Super Bowl. The songs about relationships follow Manson's tendency to discuss dark topics and emotions; "Bleed Like Me" discusses problems with empathy and "Bad Boyfriend" is about "a predatory female meeting a predatory man". The album closer "Happy Home" is about conflict within the band and in the wider world during production, the search of forgiveness, peace and coming to terms with one's place in a chaotic world.

== Promotion ==
=== Tour ===
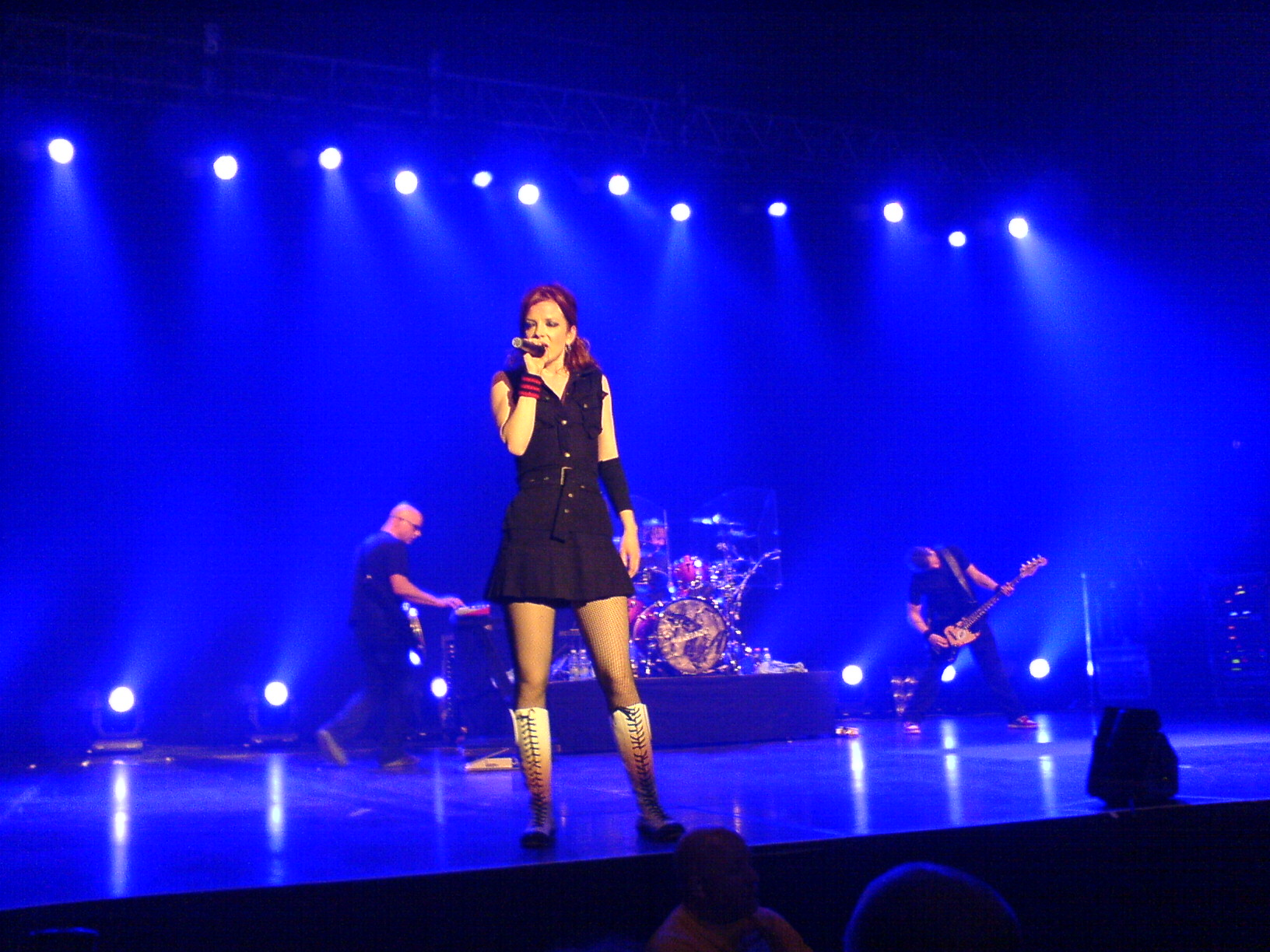
Garbage performing during the Bleed Like Me World Tour in Copenhagen on June 1, 2005

Garbage launched the Bleed Like Me World Tour promoting the record on March 29, 2005, with a concert in Paris. The tour visited North America, Europe and Australia, and encompassed headline performances, rock festivals, and television and radio shows. Former Jane's Addiction bassist Eric Avery left Alanis Morissette's backing band to perform with Garbage for the tour. Matt Walker played drums in the August 22 concert in Chicago because Vig had to depart for his mother's funeral. After being initially organized low-key, the tour was moved into large venues when Bleed Like Me and its lead single "Why Do You Love Me" became surprise hits outside the United States. In September, the band canceled concerts planned for the following month in Europe, and released a press statement saying that the band members had overextended themselves. The tour concluded with a concert in Perth, Australia, on October 1, after six months of concerts.

In 2012, Manson recalled, "The making of this record was very sad for me. Being the only girl in a gang of four can get pretty lonely. We were all struggling to find our chemistry together, and as a result, the experience of making and promoting this was tense and unenjoyable. Ironically, our shows were selling out every night. But after a while, we decided that we needed to go home to lick our wounds."

=== Singles ===
The album was preceded by the lead single "Why Do You Love Me", which peaked at number seven on the UK Singles Chart—Garbage's highest-charting single since 1996's "Stupid Girl"—while reaching number eight on Billboard's Modern Rock Tracks chart in the United States, and becoming the band's first single since 1999's "Special" to enter the Billboard Hot 100, peaking at number 97.

The title track was released as the album's second single in the US, reaching number 27 on the Modern Rock Tracks chart and number six on the Hot Dance Club Play chart. "Sex Is Not the Enemy", the album's second international single and third single overall, peaked at number 24 on the UK Singles Chart. The final single, "Run Baby Run", charted at number 47 in Australia and at number 97 in Germany.

== Critical reception ==
Professional ratings
Aggregate scores
Source	Rating
Metacritic	56/100
Review scores
Source	Rating
AllMusic	3.5/5 stars
Entertainment Weekly	B+
The Guardian	3/5 stars
Kerrang!	4/5 stars
PopMatters	4/10
Robert Christgau	(choice cut)
Rolling Stone	3.5/5 stars
Slant Magazine	3.5/5 stars
USA Today	3/4 stars
Yahoo! Music UK	6/10 stars

Bleed Like Me received mixed reviews from music critics. At Metacritic, which assigns a normalized rating out of 100 to reviews from mainstream publications, the album received an average score of 56, based on 18 reviews. Entertainment Weekly's Tom Sinclair complimented the "humongous hooks", and Kerrang! described it as the "most exciting, touching, and most painfully human material they've put out in years". Rolling Stone's David Fricke commented that "the first two-thirds of Bleed Like Me is easily the best sustained run of studio Garbage since the opening half of their 1995 debut", but that the final tracks had "a sameness—a feeling of roaring in circles". Sal Cinquemani of Slant Magazine praised the new sound and wrote that "a few of the songs ("Run Baby Run" and "Right Between the Eyes" in particular) have all the right ingredients but lack the venom present on the group's first two releases". Stephen Thomas Erlewine of AllMusic wrote that the album was enjoyable if outdated in its musical approach "as if the band doesn't quite know how to do anything else but sound like it's the heyday of post-grunge alt-rock." This opinion was shared by Yahoo! Music's Sharon O'Connell, who wrote that despite the intelligent songs with expertise in "muscly, alt. rock lick or the bubblegum pop hook", Bleed Like Me "strikes a depressingly dated note".

Writing for The A.V. Club, Nathan Rabin said the album's lyrics lacked an emotional punch. He wrote stating that it "approaches a kind of shimmering technical perfection, but remains strangely, stubbornly uninvolving". Betty Clarke of The Guardian wrote, "while Manson's changeling vocals are always worth listening to, Garbage's songs often aren't." Philip Robertson of PopMatters stated the music sounds manufactured in its too-polished manner, and that "much of what is brought to the fore on this latest musical foray is an earnest attempt at building on the marginal success of their previous power-pop/rock submissions."

== Commercial performance ==
Bleed Like Me debuted at number four on the Billboard 200 with 73,000 copies sold in its first week, becoming the band's first top-10 album on the chart. It fell to number 24 the following week, selling 32,000 copies. By October 2011, the album had sold 284,000 copies in the United States. Bleed Like Me debuted at number four on the UK Albums Chart, selling 27,375 copies in its first week. The album had sold 84,339 copies in the United Kingdom as of July 2007, and on July 22, 2013, it was certified silver by the British Phonographic Industry (BPI). Bleed Like Me also charted within the top 10 in Australia, Belgium, Canada, Finland, France, Mexico, and Sweden.

== Track listing ==
All tracks are written by Garbage, except where noted.

Bleed Like Me track listing
No.	Title	Length
1.	"Bad Boyfriend"	3:46
2.	"Run Baby Run"	3:58
3.	"Right Between the Eyes"	3:56
4.	"Why Do You Love Me"	3:54
5.	"Bleed Like Me"	4:01
6.	"Metal Heart"	3:59
7.	"Sex Is Not the Enemy"	3:06
8.	"It's All Over But the Crying"	4:39
9.	"Boys Wanna Fight"	4:16
10.	"Why Don't You Come Over"	3:25
11.	"Happy Home"	6:00
Total length:		44:54

US and Canadian enhanced CD bonus material
No.	Title	Length
12.	"Why Do You Love Me" (video)	3:52

Japanese edition bonus track
No.	Title	Writer(s)	Length
12.	"I Just Want to Have Something to Do"	Douglas Colvin; John Cummings; Jeffrey Hyman	2:26
Total length:			47:20

Australian Tour Edition bonus DVD
No.	Title	Length
1.	"Sex Is Not the Enemy" (video)	3:52
2.	"Making of Sex Is Not the Enemy" (video)	5:05
3.	"Bleed Like Me interview" (Electronic Press Kit)	30:01
4.	"Cherry Lips" (Live in Mexico – audio)	3:20
5.	"Image gallery"

2024 expanded reissue
No.	Title	Writer(s)	First released on	Length
12.	"Space Can Come Through Anyone"		"Why Do You Love Me" single	3:13
13.	"Nobody Can Win"		"Why Do You Love Me" single	2:55
14.	"I Just Want to Have Something to Do"	Colvin; Cummings; Hyman	"Why Do You Love Me" single	2:25
15.	"Honeybee"		"Sex Is Not the Enemy" and "Run Baby Run" singles	4:02
16.	"Never Be Free"		"Sex Is Not the Enemy" and "Run Baby Run" singles	4:25
17.	"Badass (2003 Ruff Demo)"		"Run Baby Run" single	3:15
18.	"Tell Me Where It Hurts"		Absolute Garbage, 2007	4:10
19.	"Betcha"		"Tell Me Where It Hurts" single	4:41
20.	"All the Good In This Life"		"Tell Me Where It Hurts" single	4:21
21.	"Witness to Your Love"		Give Listen Help: Volume 5, 2008	3:39
22.	"Bad Boyfriend (Sting Like a Bee Remix)"		"Tell Me Where It Hurts" single	5:03
23.	"Bleed Like Me (Kuppers Klub Radio Edit)"		"Bleed Like Me" single	4:04
24.	"Sex Is Not the Enemy (IL's Vocal Mix)"		"Sex Is Not the Enemy" single	5:43
25.	"Sex Is Not the Enemy (Devil's Gun Circuit Sex Remix)"		"Sex Is Not the Enemy" single	6:06
26.	"Never Be Free (Goth Mix)"		Facebook release, 2010	5:29
27.	"Tell Me Where It Hurts (Belle de Jour Mix)"		"Tell Me Where It Hurts" single	3:49
28.	"Witness to Your Love (Acoustic)"		Facebook release, 2010	4:14
Total length:				1:56:36

== Personnel ==
Credits adapted from the liner notes of Bleed Like Me.

Garbage

- Shirley Manson – vocals, electric guitar
- Steve Marker – electric guitar, acoustic guitar, synthesizers, programming, noises (all tracks); bass overdubs (tracks 1, 6)
- Duke Erikson – electric guitar, acoustic guitar, synthesizers, programming, atmospherics (all tracks); Mellotron, piano (tracks 8, 11)
- Butch Vig – electric guitar, drums, EFX, programming (all tracks); bass (track 5)

Additional musicians

- Justin Meldal-Johnsen – bass
- Matt Walker – drums (tracks 2–4, 6, 9–11)
- Dave Grohl – drums (track 1)

Artwork

- Big Active – art direction
- Mat Maitland – design, montage
- Frank W. Ockenfels III – band photography

Technical

- Garbage – production, recording
- Billy Bush – engineering
- Butch Vig – mixing
- Emily Lazar – mastering
- Sarah Register – mastering assistance
- John King – production (track 1)
- Beau Sorenson – engineering assistance
- Jay Arnold – engineering assistance
- Pete Martinez – engineering assistance
- Danny Kalb – engineering assistance
- Mark Branch – engineering assistance
- Mike Laza – engineering assistance
- Ryan Macmillan – drum tech
- Chris Heuer – drum tech

== Charts ==
=== Weekly charts ===
Weekly chart performance for Bleed Like Me
Chart (2005)	Peak position
Australian Albums (ARIA)	4
Austrian Albums (Ö3 Austria)	17
Belgian Albums (Ultratop Flanders)	12
Belgian Albums (Ultratop Wallonia)	5
Canadian Albums (Billboard)	9
Czech Albums (ČNS IFPI)	53
Danish Albums (Hitlisten)	26
Dutch Albums (Album Top 100)	28
European Albums (Billboard)	2
Finnish Albums (Suomen virallinen lista)	6
French Albums (SNEP)	6
German Albums (Offizielle Top 100)	12
Hungarian Physical Albums (MAHASZ)	31
Irish Albums (IRMA)	18
Italian Albums (FIMI)	14
Japanese Albums (Oricon)	17
Mexican Albums (Top 100 Mexico)	10
New Zealand Albums (RMNZ)	25
Norwegian Albums (VG-lista)	26
Polish Albums (ZPAV)	36
Scottish Albums (Official Charts)	2
Spanish Albums (Promusicae)	27
Swiss Albums (Schweizer Hitparade)	15
Swedish Albums (Sverigetopplistan)	7
UK Albums (Official Charts)	4
US Billboard 200	4

=== Year-end charts ===
Year-end chart performance for Bleed Like Me
Chart (2005)	Position
Belgian Albums (Ultratop Wallonia)	75
French Albums (SNEP)	187
Mexican Albums (Top 100 Mexico)	75

== Certifications and sales ==
Certifications and sales for Bleed Like Me
Region	Certification	Certified units/sales
Australia (ARIA)	Gold	35,000^{^}
United Kingdom (BPI)	Silver	84,339
United States	—	284,000
^{^} Shipments figures based on certification alone.
