= Los Abandoned =

American alternative rock band

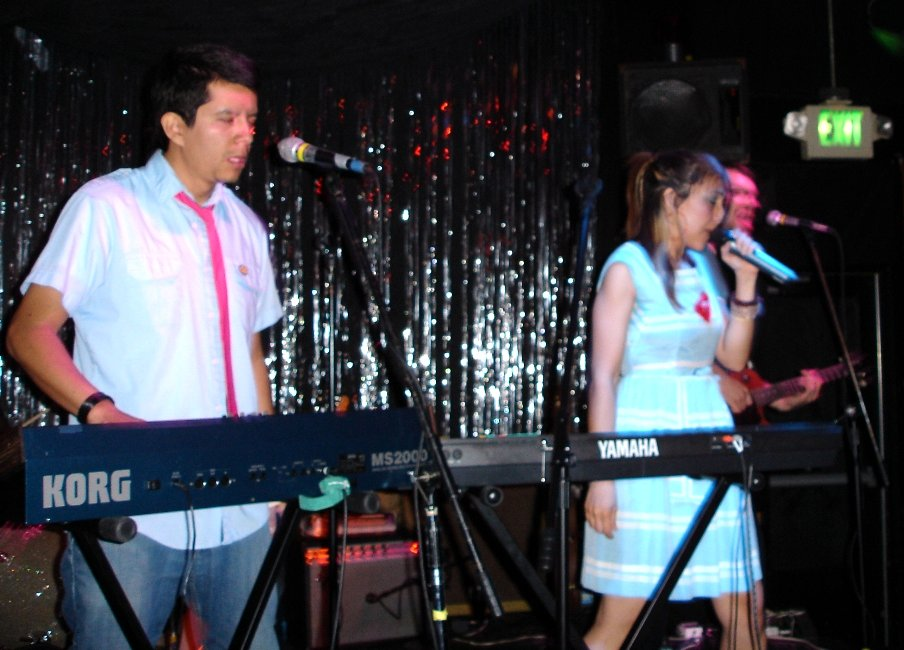
- Los Abandoned performing in June 2005

Background information
- Origin: Los Angeles, California
- Genres: Alternative rock, rock en español, pop punk, indie rock
- Years active: 2001–2007, 2023-Present
- Labels: Vapor Records
- Members: Lady P. Don Verde; Vira Lata; Dulce

Los Abandoned were an American alternative rock band from the Los Angeles, California area. The band's lyrics were in Spanish and English, or a combination of the two known as Spanglish. Their biggest hits were "Panic-oh!," "Van Nuys (es Very Nice)," and "Stalk U." They released two EPs and one LP, and in 2005, were signed with Neil Young's Vapor Records.

The band performed with artists such as Zoé, Café Tacuba, The Breeders, Calexico, Julieta Venegas, Molotov, and Aterciopelados, and participated in the South by Southwest festival in Austin, Texas. In 2005 they participated in the Latin Alternative Music Conference on the Santa Monica Pier, along with Ely Guerra and Andrea Echeverri. They also opened the Bridge School Benefit for Paul McCartney, Neil Young, and the Red Hot Chili Peppers.

On October 5, 2007, the band released a statement on their Myspace page, saying that they had decided to go their separate ways. Their final show was a free performance on October 7, 2007, at TarFest, a film, music, and art festival held at the La Brea Tar Pits.

Not long after the breakup, Gustavo Arellano wrote that Los Abandoned "reflected the postmodern Latino experience better than any band ever."

== Members ==
Chilean American Lady P (Pilar Díaz a.k.a. María del Pilar) was the lead singer of Los Abandoned, and played the ukulele, keyboards and rhythm guitar. She was the creative force behind the songwriting, in conjunction with lead guitarist Don Verde. Vira Lata played the bass guitar, and Dulce, the last addition to the band, played the drums.

== Discography ==
- Demotape (2002) EP
- Los Abandoned (2004) EP
- Office Xmas Party (2005) 7 in. Vinyl
- Mix Tape (2006)
- Favorite Band (2023) Single
