= Trafic.musique =

Trafic.musique is a French television series that aired occasionally. It featured different types of unusual music, and was shown in Metropolitan France on France 2 and in Canada on TV5 Québec Canada. The show was presented and produced by Guillaume Durand. The first episode was broadcast on 26 October 2002; the last one on 22 December 2005.

The program featured cross-generational and eclectic musical content, including artists such as David Bowie, Moby, and Elton John. The best parts of the show were later incorporated into the French television series Campus.
