= AmsterJam =

American music festival

- Genre: Alternative rock, hip hop
- Dates: various
- Locations: Randall's Island, New York, U.S.A.
- Years active: 2005-2006

AmsterJam was an American rock festival based upon the concept of the mashup fad, by transferring it to the live stage and matching up two different artists to perform their own mashups - songs or compositions created by blending two or more songs together, usually by overlaying the vocal track of one song seamlessly over the instrumental track of another. Taking its name from the Dutch home of its main sponsor, Heineken, the festival also featured an Amsterdam-themed village, a second stage for lesser-known acts, as well as numerous music-listening stations and short-film viewing suites.

The first show was curated by Bootsy Collins in association with Heineken and Michael Lang Organization and was held in Randall's Island in New York City on August 20, 2005. A second festival was held a year later at the same site on August 19, 2006.

== 2005 festival ==
The inaugural festival featured performances from Bootsy Collins, Red Hot Chili Peppers and Snoop Dogg, Garbage and Peaches, 311 and Wyclef Jean, Grandmaster Flash.

== 2006 concert ==
The second year featured performances by Tom Petty and the Heartbreakers, Foo Fighters, LL Cool J, Busta Rhymes, Tego Calderón and Yerba Buena.
