= Dave Parkin =

American football player (born 1956)

No. 44
- Position: Safety

Personal information
- Born: January 7, 1956 (age 70); Salt Lake City, Utah, U.S.
- Listed height: 6 ft 0 in (1.83 m)
- Listed weight: 191 lb (87 kg)

Career information
- High school: Highland (Salt Lake City)
- College: Utah State
- NFL draft: 1979: 9th round, 239th overall pick

Career history
- Detroit Lions (1979)

Career NFL statistics
- Games played: 9
- Stats at Pro Football Reference

David Rodney Parkin (born January 7, 1956) is an American former professional football player who was a safety for the Detroit Lions of the National Football League (NFL). He played college football for the Utah State Aggies.
