= Why Do You Love Me =

2005 single by Garbage

Single by Garbage

from the album Bleed Like Me
- B-side: "Space Can Come Through Anyone"; "Nobody Can Win"; "I Just Wanna Have Something to Do"
- Released: February 22, 2005
- Recorded: 2003–2004
- Studio: Smart (Madison, Wisconsin)
- Genre: Alternative rock; post-grunge; punk rock
- Length: 3:52
- Label: A&E; Geffen (North America)
- Songwriter: Garbage
- Producer: Garbage

Garbage singles chronology
"Shut Your Mouth" (2002)	"Why Do You Love Me" (2005)	"Bleed Like Me" (2005)

Audio sample
- "Why Do You Love Me": file; help

Music video
- "Why Do You Love Me" on YouTube

"Why Do You Love Me" is a song by alternative rock band Garbage, released as the lead single from their fourth studio album, Bleed Like Me (2005).

The single was the first taste of the band's change in musical direction, eschewing the electronic-leaning production of their preceding albums Beautiful Garbage and Version 2.0 for guitar-led rock. "It's about the fundamental insecurity in all human beings that they are unlovable", band singer and lyricist Shirley Manson told NME, "Feeling unlovable drives us into marriage, monogamy, jealousy and possessiveness." "I feel that at the base of everyone there's a belief that we're truly lovable. But we often question it, which is why we seek out exclusive relationships." Uptempo, and wrapped around a signature monster guitar riff, "Why Do You Love Me" was described by the band as "Spector-esque" in interviews.

In the United States, "Why Do You Love Me" became Garbage's first Hot 100 appearance in over six years, since "Special" reached number 52 in May 1999, and first top 10 song at alternative radio since "I Think I'm Paranoid" peaked at number six in September 1998. In the United Kingdom, "Why Do You Love Me" was Garbage's highest-charting single since 1996's "Stupid Girl" and broke a run of six consecutive Garbage singles to fall short of the UK Top 10. "Why Do You Love Me" propelled the Bleed Like Me album to the top five in Australia, United Kingdom and in the United States, where the album debuted at a career-high number four.

== Background ==
"Why Do You Love Me" was written and recorded at the band's own Smart Studios in Madison, Wisconsin. Garbage had quietly disbanded during the sessions for Bleed Like Me in October 2003, before reforming to make a fresh start on the album early the next year. Drummer Butch Vig found himself confused over which direction to take the band's sound, before deciding to strip back to the basics of electric guitar, bass guitar and drums, using more first takes from vocalist and lyricist Shirley Manson's vocals, and reducing the synth components. Despite the basic tracks for "Why Do You Love Me" existing for some time, it was a song that didn't come together until near the end of the album sessions. "It sounds like a girl-group sped up... a girl-group on speed" guitarist Duke Erikson later described. Bass parts were performed by session musician Justin Meldal-Johnsen. Vig wanted the ability to control some of the recording from the studio control booth, so Matt Walker was approached to play drums on a number of tracks, including "Why Do You Love Me". After the recording and mixing process, "Why Do You Love Me" was mastered by Emily Lazar and Sarah Register at The Lodge in New York. The heavy guitar riff, while always throughout, was only added to the opening of the song during the mastering stages.

Both of Garbage's record labels were keen to release "Why Do You Love Me" as the lead single for Bleed Like Me, delighting Manson, as she felt that labels often err on the side of caution with singles and pick "the obvious hit". Manson: "We chose "Why Do You Love Me" as the first single because it has a lot of mood shifts and embodies the whole record." "Why Do You Love Me" was the first Garbage single to be released under both the band's major record deals: in North America under Almo/Geffen Records after transferring from Interscope, and outside of North America, on A&E Records, which was the imprint created to house Mushroom Records artists after the 2003 purchase of that label by Warner Music UK from NewsCorp.

In 2007, "Why Do You Love Me" was remastered and included on Garbage's greatest hits album Absolute Garbage. During the week of February 19, 2008, instrumental stems for "Why Do You Love Me" were made available as a downloadable master track for use in the video game Rock Band.

== Single release ==
"Why Do You Love Me" premiered on North American radio the week ending February 12. Ahead of the official radio-date, fifty-four modern rock stations added it to their playlists (making it the number-one most-added track for the week) and six triple-A stations added the song. After one week on air, "Why Do You Love Me" debuted at number 39 on the Hot Modern Rock Tracks chart. "Why Do You Love Me" was officially serviced the week of February 22 and from there the song gained 535 spins (certified the track with the Most Increased Plays) and another eleven rock station playlists. On March 8, "Why Do You Love Me" was made commercially available as a digital download in the United States and Canada and debuted at number 94 on the Hot 100. The same week, "Why Do You Love Me" reached number 10 on the alternative radio chart and debuted at number 81 on the Pop 100. By the end of March, "Why Do You Love Me" weekly airplay growth settled, gaining no additional station playlist support, causing the track to leave the Hot 100 and exit the alternative top ten. In April, "Why Do You Love Me" rebounded to number eight upon the street date of the Bleed Like Me album. On April 20, Garbage performed "Why Do You Love Me" as part of an in-studio set taped for Fuse's music show Comp'd. By the end of the month, despite the number four chart position of the album and Garbage being on a North American tour with scheduled radio show stops to perform the single acoustically, "Why Do You Love Me" quickly lost radio support. On May 9, "Bleed Like Me" was serviced to radio as the follow-up single.

On February 18, 2005, A&E Records launched the UK campaign for "Why Do You Love Me" with its radio premiere on BBC Radio 1's Jo Whiley Show. Radio 1 later C-listed the song, XFM playlisted it as their "Single of the Week", becoming their most played track for several weeks, but beyond this "Why Do You Love Me" struggled for support from mainstream radio. At the end of March, Garbage's label re-serviced a brand new radio edit of "Why Do You Love Me" to try and pick up radio support as Garbage kicked off a two-week media blitz, including live shows, across London, Paris and Cologne. "Why Do You Love Me" was taped performed live on French televisions 20h10 petantes, Traffic music and on Album de la semaine (as part of a five-song set), and for UK television, performances on CD:UK, Napster Live, Popworld, a pre-record of Top of the Pops and finally on Friday Night with Jonathan Ross. Garbage also performed "Why Do You Love Me" and "Vow" acoustically on an XFM radio session. On April 4, "Why Do You Love Me" was released in the UK on CD, DVD and limited edition 7-inch, as well as digital download. The mid-week chart flashes suggested a number four debut, after selling 10,089 copies, "Why Do You Love Me" charted at number seven on the UK Singles chart. Despite radio's reluctance to champion the song, "Why Do You Love Me" debuted on the UK Airplay chart at number 98.

== Critical reception ==
"Why Do You Love Me" received a mostly positive reception from contemporary music critics. In a review for Billboard, Keith Caulfield wrote, "Listeners will find themselves involuntarily bobbing their heads and tapping their toes. Matched with smart (yet cryptic) lyrics, this has all the makings of a monster hit". In an album review for NME, critic Dan Martin was not convinced by the subject matter: "Back in the day [Manson] was always this band's beating human heart. But by singing the sorrows of a teenage girl, [Manson] has become the Borg Queen at the heart of the machine". Similarly, John Perry of Q, wrote "While songs such as "Why Do You Love Me" have the breathy, confessional quality Manson has always used to effect, there's no sense that she is admitting to anything interesting" in his album review.

== Music video ==
Shirley Manson and Duke Erikson allude to the band's passive-aggression in the "Why Do You Love Me" video

The music video for "Why Do You Love Me" was shot over two days at the end of January 2005 on a Los Angeles, CA, soundstage and was helmed by director Sophie Muller. Scenes shot on January 31 included actual Garbage fans who applied via the band's website, in lieu of agency-hired models, at the band's request. Shirley Manson thanked all those who took part in a post on the website a few days later.

Muller's video concept revolved around the band's relationship troubles during October 2003. She wanted to film snapshots of where the band was at the time, to telegraph the communication breakdown between the band. The video starts with Manson reluctantly getting out of bed (the word LIAR written on the wall above her headboard) and moves onto reenactments of non-verbal ill-communication with both Marker and Erikson. In the kitchen, Manson retreats with a book and soup while Marker kicks and smashes things, then Erikson appears as a painter, receiving direction from Vig and Marker. Then in spite of it all, the band straps on instruments and rocks out before fighting again. A scene of Manson in a bathtub references Manson's 2003 breaking point, before regrouping to perform in front of Garbage fans. "It's about the dynamic of wanting to communicate but we're at cross-purposes". The oversized portrait of Deborah Harry taken by Chris Stein was gifted to the production by Harry herself.

In the United Kingdom, a short clip of the "Why Do You Love Me" video was broadcast on MTV's Gonzo, before being playlisted across the music networks. In North America, the music video was playlisted by VH1 the week of March 7, Fuse the following week; Geffen licensed the music video to run in over 3,000 movie theaters, on the TV walls of Macy's, Steve Madden and JCPenney stores, and featured on Victoria's Secret's Pink in-store sampler.

The "Why Do You Love Me" video was first made commercially available on the "Why Do You Love Me" DVD single and on the CD-ROM enhanced section of the "Why Do You Love Me" CD maxi singles. A remastered version of that video was included on Garbage's 2007 greatest hits DVD Absolute Garbage, and made available as a digital download via online music services the same year. In 2008, a second edit of the video was released to iTunes; this version edited out the title of the book Shirley read in the video: J. D. Salinger's The Catcher in the Rye. The "Why Do You Love Me" video was uploaded to VEVO in 2009.

== Track listings ==
"Why Do You Love Me" was augmented with several bonus tracks cut from the album sessions. The sparse, simple "Nobody Can Win" contrasted the dense, funky "Space Can Come Through Anyone" which was co-produced by Dust Brothers member John King. Bass parts on "Space Can Come Through Anyone" were performed by Justin Meldal-Johnsen and additional drums by Matt Chamberlain. An additional b-side, a cover version of the Ramones "I Just Wanna Have Something To Do", was recorded in Ocean Way Studios, Nashville, in May 2002, for the We're a Happy Family: A Tribute to Ramones tribute album. Bass was performed by Daniel Shulman, while additional backing vocals were provided by Vig's then-partner Beth Halper. A guitar-led arrangement of the band's Beautiful Garbage single "Cherry Lips (Go Baby Go!)" appeared exclusively on the DVD single.

- UK 7-inch single
1. "Why Do You Love Me" – 3:52
2. "Space Can Come Through Anyone" – 3:18
- UK and European CD single
1. "Why Do You Love Me" – 3:52
2. "Nobody Can Win" – 2:51
- UK DVD single
1. "Why Do You Love Me" – 3:52
2. "Cherry Lips (Le Royale mix)" – 3:15
3. "Why Do You Love Me (video)" – 3:52
4. "Bleed Like Me: Interview (video)" – 10:00
- International digital EP
1. "Why Do You Love Me" – 3:52
2. "Space Can Come Through Anyone" – 3:18
3. "Nobody Can Win" – 2:51
4. "I Just Want to Have Something to Do" – 2:25
- European, Japanese, Mexican and Australian E-CD maxi single
1. "Why Do You Love Me" – 3:52
2. "Space Can Come Through Anyone" – 3:18
3. "Nobody Can Win" – 2:51
4. "I Just Want to Have Something to Do" – 2:25
5. "Why Do You Love Me (video)" – 3:52

== Charts ==
=== Weekly charts ===
Weekly chart performance for "Why Do You Love Me"
Chart (2005)	Peak position
Australia (ARIA)	19
Belgium (Ultratip Bubbling Under Wallonia)	17
European Hot 100 Singles (Billboard)	22
Germany (GfK)	63
Ireland (IRMA)	27
Netherlands (Single Top 100)	100
Scotland Singles (OCC)	4
Switzerland (Schweizer Hitparade)	75
UK Singles (OCC)	7
US Billboard Hot 100	94
US Alternative Airplay (Billboard)	8

=== Year-end charts ===
Year-end chart performance for "Why Do You Love Me"
Chart (2005)	Position
US Modern Rock Tracks (Billboard)	66

== Release history ==
Release history and formats for "Why Do You Love Me"
Region	Date	Format	Label
United States	February 22, 2005	Modern rock radio; triple-A radio	Almo Sounds; Geffen
Canada	March 8, 2005	Digital download	Almo Sounds; Geffen
United States	March 8, 2005	Digital download	Almo Sounds; Geffen
Australia	March 28, 2005	Enhanced CD maxi single	Festival Mushroom
Europe	March 28, 2005	CD single; enhanced CD maxi single	Warner
United Kingdom	April 4, 2005	CD single; DVD single; 7-inch single	A&E
