= Red Jezebel =

Australian indie rock band

- Origin: Perth, Western Australia
- Genre: Alternative rock
- Years active: 1997–present
- Labels: Walking Horse Music (2015–present); Sunday Ride Records (2007–2015); Mushroom (2006–2007); Sunday Ride (2005); Halflight (1998–1999); Independent (2000–2004)
- Members: Paul Wood; Dave Parkin; Mark Cruickshank; Fraser Cringle
- Past members: Chris Hayes; Alex Hyman
- Website: Official website

Red Jezebel is a four-piece indie rock band from Perth, Western Australia.

== History ==
=== 1997-2002: Early EPs ===
The band competed in the Western Australia final of the Australian National Campus Band Competition at the Planet Nightclub in North Perth in 1997. Eskimo Joe won and went on to win the national final, while Red Jezebel came fourth.

The band's name comes from an emergency evacuation codeword used by an Australian supermarket chain that a number of the members worked for in the group's early years.

Between 1998 and 2000, the band released three EPs: Joyful Possibilities, In Transit and Intermezzo. Within this time, the band received a "Kiss My WAMi" award for "Most Promising Band" in 1998, completed two national tours (with Jebediah and Bodyjar), made live appearances on Triple J and ABC's Recovery TV program, and performed at The Big Day Out.

In 2002, Red Jezebel released the EP Home Coming. Also in 2002, Mark Cruickshank won a WAMi award for "Most Popular Male Original Bass Player".

=== 2003-present ===
In October 2003, Red Jezebel released the single "Wide Open Spaces", which received widespread airplay in Australia.

Revelations was the band's first studio album and was released in June 2006 on the Perth-based label Sunday Ride Records. It was recorded by Dave Parkin at Blackbird Studios in Western Australia. The album includes the songs "Wide Open Spaces", "Ocean Blue Eyes", "Devil’s Advocate", "You’re Making Me Nervous" and "See Through Dress", all of which received heavy rotation on Triple J.

Red Jezebel spent the whole of July 2006 in Blackbird Studios putting the finishing touches to another EP which was due for release in July 2007. This was intended to be the band's first major label release, having signed to the Mushroom Records label through Warner Music. These inititial plans for an EP release were delayed because of various record company-related factors, causing the band to leave Warner Music. Instead, the band released a 13-track LP entitled How I Learnt to Stop Worrying in October 2007 on their own label, Sunday Ride Records, distributed by MGM. The first song from the album "Kicking Deadly Sins" received significant airplay on Triple J, various community radio stations around Australia (Edge Radio, RTRFM) and the video on rage.

== Touring ==
Red Jezebel has played many shows since its formation in 1997, and has supported some of pop and rock's biggest names, including Art of Fighting, Bluebottle Kiss, Blueline Medic, Brad, Deadstar, Even, Gerling, The Living End, Mach Pelican, The Mavis's, Motor Ace, Powderfinger, Sidewinder, Skulker, Something for Kate, The Superjesus, Tumbleweed and Keane.

In 2005, the band completed three interstate tours and performed at the Southbound festival in Busselton.

In 2006, the band tour was the main support for Eskimo Joe, and for Dan Kelly and the Alpha Males during their first Western Australian headline tour. Following this, the band toured nationally with Little Birdy.

== Band members ==
=== Former members ===
- Paul Wood – vocals, guitar
- Dave Parkin – guitar
- Mark Cruickshank – bass guitar
- Alex Hyman – drums
- Fraser Cringle – drums
- Chris Hayes – guitar

== Discography ==
=== Albums ===
Title	Details
Revelations	Released: June 2004; Label: Sunday Ride Records (SRR2); Format: CD
How I Learnt to Stop Worrying	Released: October 2007; Format: CD
Coup De Grâce	Released: 13 March 2015; Label: Walking Horse (WALK028); Format: CD, DD

=== EPs ===
Title	Details
Joyful Possibilites	Released: March 1998; Label: Halflight (Hal001); Format: CD
In Transit	Released: 1999; Label: Halflight (Hal005); Format: CD
Intermezzo	Released: 2000; Label: Red Jezebel (SM004); Format: CD
Home Coming	Released: 2002; Format: CD

== Awards ==
=== West Australian Music Industry Awards ===
The Western Australian Music Industry Awards (commonly known as WAMis) are annual awards presented to the local contemporary music industry, put on by the Western Australian Music Industry Association Inc (WAM).

Year	Nominee / work	Award	Result (wins only)
2002	Mark Cruickshank (Red Jezebel)	Most Popular Male Original Bass Player	Won
2005	Dave Parkin (Red Jezebel)	Best Record Producer/Engineer	Won
2006	Dave Parkin (Red Jezebel)	Best Record Producer/Engineer	Won
