= Matt Walker (drummer) =

American musician (born 1969)

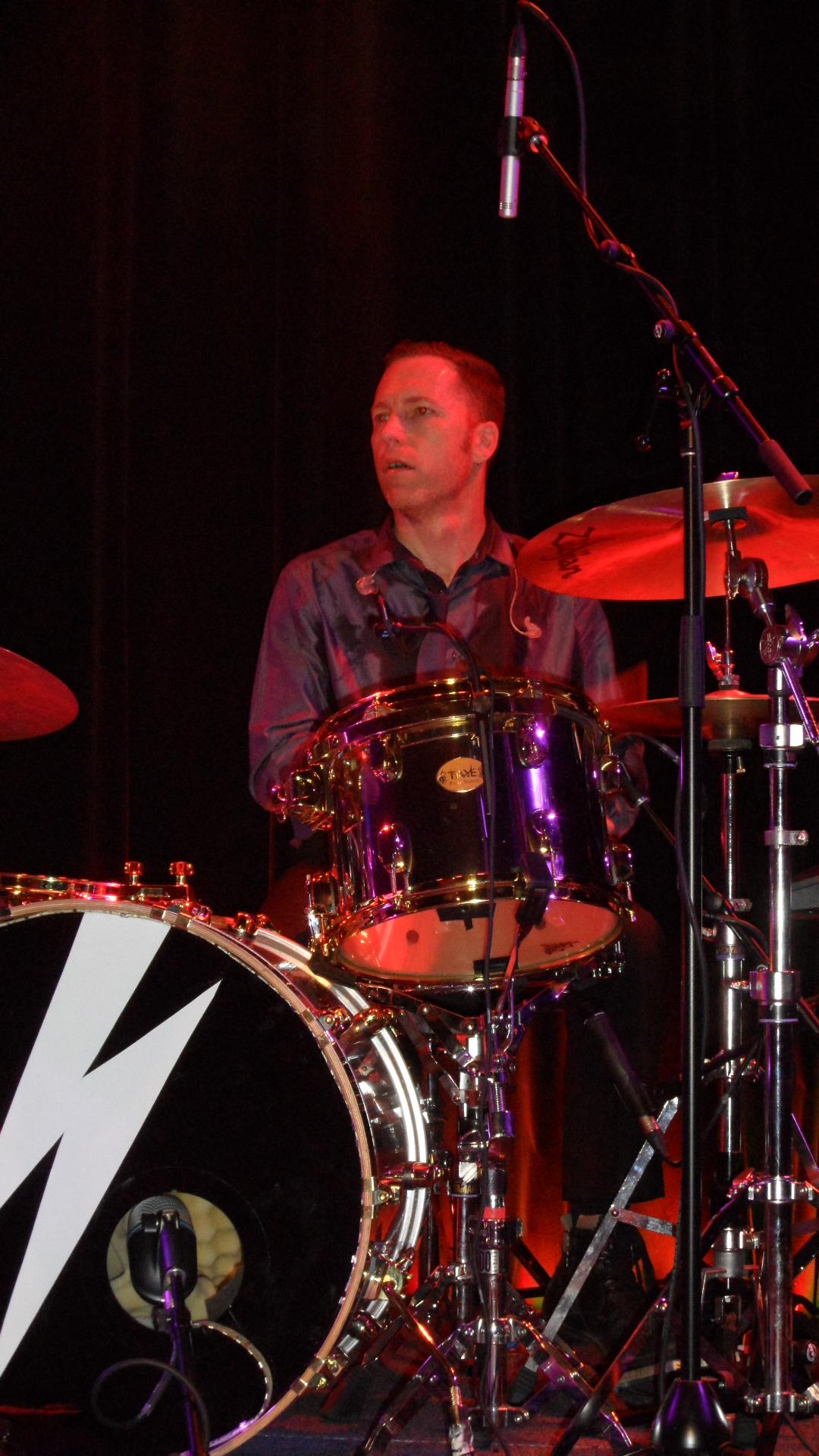
- Walker in 2014

Background information
- Born: 1969 (age 56–57); Wilmette, Illinois
- Genres: Alternative rock, experimental
- Occupation: Drummer
- Instrument: Drums
- Years active: 1987–present
- Formerly of: Filter, The Smashing Pumpkins, Cupcakes, The Most Dangerous Race, Impossible Recording Machine, Garbage, Morrissey, Beautiful Assassins

Matt Walker is an American session musician, known for drumming with Filter, The Smashing Pumpkins and Morrissey, as well as being the regular fill-in to Butch Vig from Garbage on three of their tours (2002, 2016, 2019).

== Biography ==
Walker began his career in Chicago in the mid-1980s, when he began playing drums for local Chicago bands and then joined Filter in 1994. Matt toured with Filter in support of the album, Short Bus until 1996. Filter toured with The Smashing Pumpkins in Europe and when Pumpkins drummer Jimmy Chamberlin was fired after a heroin overdose, Walker was hired to replace Chamberlin. He finished the Mellon Collie and the Infinite Sadness tour with the band (1996–1997) and all of their dates up until the beginning of the Adore tour. Walker also recorded the song "The End Is the Beginning Is the End" with the band on the official Batman & Robin movie soundtrack, as well as several tracks on The Smashing Pumpkins Adore. He also worked with Pumpkins frontman Billy Corgan on the soundtrack for the movie Ransom and with Pumpkins guitarist James Iha on Iha's solo album Let It Come Down.

In 1998, Walker's own band, Cupcakes, was signed to DreamWorks Records and subsequently left the Pumpkins to record the Cupcakes album.

Walker was replaced by John Mellencamp's drummer, Kenny Aronoff, for the Pumpkins "Adore" tour. Walker did, however, play with the Pumpkins again at their last show before their first break up, on December 2, 2000. He played percussion on an alternate version of the song "Muzzle" and drums on "1979", while the original drummer Jimmy Chamberlin played acoustic guitar.

Walker has collaborated with many artists including Ashtar Command with former Filter member, Brian Liesegang, and Chris Holmes to which Sinéad O’Connor sang a track.

Matt co-created the band, Impossible Recording Machine with Jim Dinou.

In 2002, Matt filled in for an ailing Butch Vig during Garbage's European tour.

In 2003, he release an album under the band, Beautiful Assassins, called Preamp on the label Positron! Records.

In 2005, he played on Garbage's album, Bleed Like Me, and also recorded and toured with Billy Corgan to promote the solo album, TheFutureEmbrace.

Walker has played drums with Morrissey since 2006, appearing on his albums Years of Refusal, Swords, World Peace Is None of Your Business, Low in High School and I Am Not a Dog on a Chain.

Walker was also a member of the band the MDR (the Most Dangerous Race), which appeared on the 2007 MySpace/SPIN Smashing Pumpkins tribute album performing "Signal to Noise," an unreleased Smashing Pumpkins song.

He rejoined the Pumpkins on percussion during the Chicago dates of their 20th anniversary tour in November and December 2008.

While on hiatus from Morrissey, Matt writes songs and performs under the name "of1000faces" with various singers and musicians. Under his own name in 2009, Walker co-wrote with Adam Ant and Morrissey/Ant guitarist Boz Boorer, as well as drummed on, the track Marrying The Gunner's Daughter, the quasi-title track of Ant's 2013 album Adam Ant Is the Blueblack Hussar in Marrying the Gunner's Daughter.

Walker performed with the Pumpkins at a benefit concert at the Metro in Chicago, in July 2010 for an encore of "1979.

In 2016, Walker again filled in for Butch Vig during the first leg of Garbage's European tour, as well as the entirety of the European leg of their 2019 tour.

== Drum setup ==
In a 2010 interview, Matt stated he uses all Zildjian cymbals. His drum kit varies on the material he is working on but has used a Gretsch USA Custom 6-piece kit.
