= Tegan and Sara discography =

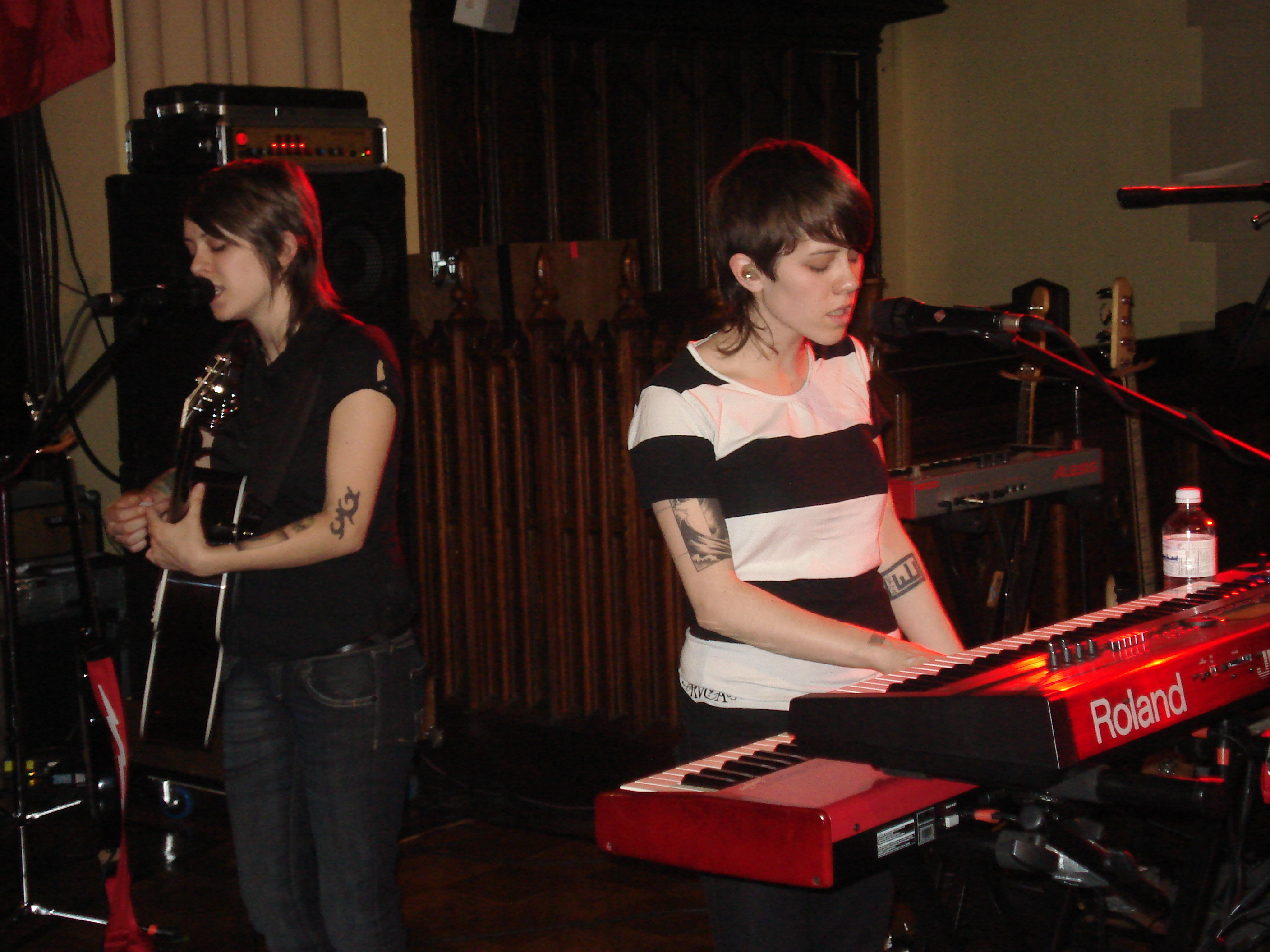
- Tegan and Sara performing at Sydenham United Church in Kingston, Ontario, Canada in 2007
- Studio albums: 10
- Singles: 26
- Video albums: 3
- Music videos: 31

Canadian indie pop duo Tegan and Sara have released ten studio albums and thirteen singles. They released their first album, Under Feet Like Ours, independently in 1999. Their first major release was This Business of Art, released in 2000 on Vapor Records. This album contained their debut single, "The First".

Tegan and Sara have four Gold certified albums by Music Canada (formerly the Canadian Recording Industry Association). In addition, four of their ten studio albums have charted in the top five of the Canadian Albums Chart, two peaking at number four, one peaking at three and one at number two.

== Albums ==
=== Studio albums ===
List of albums, with selected chart positions
Title	Album details	Peak chart positions										Sales	Certifications
Title	Album details	CAN	AUS	AUT	BEL (FL)	FIN	IRL	NL	NZ	UK	US	Sales	Certifications
Under Feet Like Ours	Release date: April 6, 1999; Label: Self-released; Formats: CD, cassette, LP, streaming	—	—	—	—	—	—	—	—	—	—		
This Business of Art	Release date: July 18, 2000; Label: Vapor; Formats: CD, cassette, LP, streaming	—	—	—	—	—	—	—	—	—	—		
If It Was You	Release date: August 20, 2002; Label: Vapor; Formats: CD, LP, streaming	—	—	—	—	—	—	—	—	—	—	US: 18,000+	
So Jealous	Release date: September 14, 2004; Label: Vapor, Sanctuary; Formats: CD, LP, digital download, streaming	—	— (Note: So Jealous did not enter the Australian ARIA Albums Chart but peaked at number 20 on the ARIA Hitseekers Chart.)	—	—	—	—	—	—	—	— (Note: So Jealous did not enter the US Billboard 200, but peaked at number 26 on the US Heatseekers Albums Chart.)	US: 236,000; WW: 300,000+	MC: Gold
The Con	Release date: July 24, 2007; Label: Vapor, Sire; Formats: CD, LP, digital download, streaming	4	32	—	47	—	—	—	—	—	34	US: 216,000+	MC: Gold
Sainthood	Release date: October 26, 2009; Label: Vapor, Sire; Formats: CD, LP, digital download, streaming	4	21	—	92	—	—	—	—	—	21	US: 115,000+	MC: Gold
Heartthrob	Release date: January 29, 2013; Label: Vapor, Sire; Formats: CD, LP, digital download, streaming	2	14	57	97	30	24	94	27	38	3	US: 199,000+	MC: Gold
Love You to Death	Release date: June 3, 2016; Label: Vapor, Sire; Formats: CD, LP, digital download, streaming	3	13	—	61	—	29	119	—	30	16	US: 27,000	
Hey, I'm Just Like You	Released: September 27, 2019; Label: Sire; Formats: CD, LP, digital download, streaming	43	— (Note: Hey, I'm Just Like You did not enter the ARIA Albums Chart, but peaked at number 21 on the ARIA Digital Album Chart.)	—	—	—	—	—	—	—	154		
Crybaby	Released: October 21, 2022; Label: Mom + Pop; Formats: CD, LP, digital download, streaming	—	—	—	—	—	—	—	—	—	—		
"—" denotes a recording that did not chart or was not released in that territory.

=== Live albums ===
Title	Album details	Peak chart positions
Title	Album details	US Sales
Get Along	Released: November 15, 2011; Label: Warner Music; Formats: LP, CD, Digital download, streaming	—
Tonight in the Dark We're Seeing Colors	Released: September 26, 2020; Label: Sire; Formats: LP, Digital download, streaming	37

=== Remix albums ===
Title	Album details
Back in Your Head (The Complete Collection)	Released: 2009; Label: Sire
Alligator	Released: October 26, 2009; Label: London / Rhino / Sire
Closer Remixed	Released: March 8, 2013; Label: Warner Bros.

=== Compilation albums ===
Title	Album details	Peak chart positions	
Title	Album details	CAN	US Sales
Tegan and Sara Present The Con X: Covers	Released: October 20, 2017; Label: Warner Bros.; Formats: CD, LP, digital download	82	—
Still Jealous	Released: February 11, 2022; Label: Sire; Formats: Digital download, streaming	—	78
"—" denotes a recording that did not chart or was not released in that territory.

=== Video albums ===
Title	Album details	Peak chart positions			Certifications
Title	Album details	US	US Alt	US Rock	Certifications
It's Not Fun, Don't Do It!	Released: August 8, 2006; Label: Sanctuary; Formats: DVD	—	—	—	MC: Gold
The Con – The Movie (Note: On the DVD portion of the CD/DVD The Con)	Released: July 24, 2007; Label: Vapor; Formats: DVD	—	—	—	
Get Along	Released: November 15, 2011; Label: Warner Music; Formats: DVD, LP, live album	116	14	20	
"—" denotes a recording that did not chart or was not released in that territory.

== Extended plays ==
Title	EP details
Tegan and Sara	Released: 2002; Label: Sire
I'll Take the Blame	Released: November 13, 2007; Label: Vapor / Sire
Live Session (iTunes Exclusive)	Released: April 28, 2008; Label: Sire
In Your Head: An Introduction to Tegan and Sara	Released: 2012; Label: Vapor / Warner Bros.

== Singles ==
=== As lead artist ===
List of singles, with selected chart positions and certifications, showing year released and album name
Title	Year	Peak chart positions										Certifications	Album
Title	Year	CAN	CAN Rock	AUS	BEL (FL)	IRL	NLD Tip	NZ	SCO	UK	US	Certifications	Album
"The First"	2000	—	×	—	—	—	—	—	—	—	—		This Business of Art
"Time Running"	2003	—	×	—	—	—	—	—	—	—	—		If It Was You
"I Hear Noises"	2003	—	×	68	—	—	—	—	—	—	—		If It Was You
"Living Room"	2003	—	×	—	—	—	—	—	—	—	—		If It Was You
"Monday Monday Monday"	2003	—	×	—	—	—	—	—	—	—	—		If It Was You
"Walking with a Ghost"	2004	—	×	—	—	—	—	—	—	—	—		So Jealous
"Speak Slow"	2004	—	×	—	—	—	—	—	—	—	—		So Jealous
"Back in Your Head"	2007	— (Note: "Back in Your Head" did not enter the Canadian Singles Chart, but peaked at number 63 on the Canadian Digital Songs chart.)	36	—	32	—	—	—	—	—	—		The Con
"The Con"	2007	— (Note: "The Con" did not enter the Canadian Singles Chart, but peaked at number 43 on the Canadian Digital Songs chart.)	41	—	—	—	—	—	72	— (Note: "The Con" did not enter the UK Singles Chart, but peaked at number 82 on the UK Physical Singles Chart Top 100.)	—		The Con
"Call It Off"	2008	—	—	—	—	—	—	—	—	—	—		The Con
"Hell"	2009	56	20	—	—	—	—	—	—	—	—		Sainthood
"Alligator"	2009	—	—	—	—	—	—	—	—	—	—		Sainthood
"Closer"	2012	13	35	—	—	—	15	—	—	—	90	MC: 2× Platinum; RIAA: Gold	Heartthrob
"I Was a Fool"	2013	19	—	—	—	—	—	—	—	143	—	MC: Platinum	Heartthrob
"Goodbye, Goodbye"	2013	30	—	—	—	—	—	—	—	—	—		Heartthrob
"Guilty as Charged"	2014	—	—	—	—	—	—	—	—	— (Note: "Guilty as Charged" did not enter the UK Singles Chart, but peaked at number 36 on the UK Physical Singles Chart Top 100.)	—		Heartthrob
"Everything Is Awesome" (featuring The Lonely Island)	2014	35	—	— (Note: "Everything Is Awesome" did not enter the Australian Singles Chart, but peaked at number 23 on the ARIA Digital Track Chart.)	—	24	—	11	18	17	57	BPI: Silver; RIAA: Platinum	The Lego Movie: Original Motion Picture Soundtrack
"Boyfriend"	2016	64	—	—	—	—	—	—	—	—	—		Love You to Death
"Stop Desire"	2016	—	—	—	—	—	—	—	—	—	—		Love You to Death
"I'll Be Back Someday"	2019	—	31	—	—	—	—	—	—	—	—		Hey, I'm Just Like You
"Fucking Up What Matters"	2022	—	—	—	—	—	—	—	—	—	—		Crybaby
"Yellow"	2022	—	49	—	—	—	—	—	—	—	—		Crybaby
"Faded Like a Feeling"	2022	—	—	—	—	—	—	—	—	—	—		Crybaby
"I Can't Grow Up"	2022	—	—	—	—	—	—	—	—	—	—		Crybaby
"Smoking Weed Alone"	2022	—	—	—	—	—	—	—	—	—	—		Crybaby
"Girls Talk"	2023	—	—	—	—	—	—	—	—	—	—		Non-album single
"Rebel Rebel" (featuring Grace Nocturnal)	2024	—	—	—	—	—	—	—	—	—	—		Spiders From Venus: Indie Women Artists and Female-Fronted Bands Cover David Bowie
"Right on Time" (with Felix Cartal)	2024	—	—	—	—	—	—	—	—	—	—		I, Sabotage
"I Love Christmas"	2026	—	—	—	—	—	—	—	—	—	—		
"—" denotes releases that did not chart. "×" denotes periods where charts did not exist or were not archived.

=== As featured artist ===
Title	Year	Peak chart positions					Certifications	Album
Title	Year	CAN	CAN AC	CAN Pop	NLD Tip	US Dance Air	Certifications	Album
"Do They Know It's Christmas?" (Fucked Up) (Note: Featuring Ezra Koenig, Kyp Malone, Kevin Drew, David Cross, Yo La Tengo, Bob Mould, Tegan and Sara, and GZA.)	2009	—	—	—	—	—		Non-album single
"Feel It in My Bones" (Tiësto featuring Tegan and Sara)	2010	29	26	12	7	19	MC: Platinum	Kaleidoscope
"Body Work" (Morgan Page featuring Tegan and Sara)	2012	32	26	14	—	25	MC: Gold	In the Air
"Hard to Hold" (RAC featuring Tegan and Sara)	2014	—	—	—	—	—		Strangers
"Make Things Right" (Sultan & Shepard featuring Tegan and Sara)	2015	—	—	—	—	—		Non-album single
"When You Were Mine" (Night Terrors of 1927 featuring Tegan and Sara)	2015	—	—	—	—	—		Everything's Coming Up Roses
"Bad Ones" (Matthew Dear featuring Tegan and Sara)	2018	—	—	—	—	—		Bunny
"Horses" (Matthew Dear featuring Tegan and Sara)	2018	—	—	—	—	—		Bunny
"Cloud 9" (Beach Bunny featuring Tegan and Sara)	2021	—	—	—	—	—		Non-album singles
"Teenage Tears" (Arkells featuring Tegan and Sara)	2022	—	—	—	—	—		Blink Twice
"—" denotes releases that did not chart.

=== Promotional singles ===
Title	Year	Peak chart positions						Album
Title	Year	CAN	CAN Alt.	CAN AC	CAN Pop	CAN Rock	FRA	Album
"On Directing"	2010	—	27	—	—	44	—	Sainthood
"Northshore"	2010	—	8	—	—	33	—	Sainthood
"I'm Not Your Hero"	2012	58	—	16	43	—	157	Heartthrob
"U-Turn"	2016	—	—	—	—	—	—	Love You to Death
"100x"	2016	—	—	—	—	—	—	Love You to Death
"Hey, I'm Just Like You"	2019	—	—	—	—	—	—	Hey, I'm Just Like You
"Where Does the Good Go"	2022	—	—	—	—	—	148	Still Jealous
"—" denotes releases that did not chart.

== Other songs ==
=== Other album appearances ===
Year	Song	Other artist(s)	Album
2003	"Rebel Rebel"	—N/a	Spiders from Venus (Skipping Discs)
2008	"The Man with Two Brains"	—N/a	Friends of P: Tribute to The Rentals
2010	"Back in Your Head" (live)	—N/a	2010 Summer Tour EP
2010	"Sheets"	—N/a	2010 Summer Tour EP
2010	"The Chipmunk Song (Christmas Time Is Here)"	—N/a	Gift Wrapped Vol. II
2010	"Intervention"	Margaret Cho	Cho Dependent
2012	"Every Chance We Get We Run"	David Guetta and Alesso	Nothing but the Beat 2.0
2013	"Fool to Cry"	—N/a	Girls, Vol. 1 (Music from the HBO Original Series)
2013	"Shudder to Think"	—N/a	Dallas Buyers Club (Music From and Inspired By the Motion Picture)
2014	"Don't Find Another Love"	—N/a	Endless Love (Original Motion Picture Soundtrack)
2016	"Fade Out"	—N/a	The Intervention (film score)
2017	"Ground Control"	All Time Low	Last Young Renegade
2020	"Make You Mine This Season"	—N/a	Happiest Season: Music from and Inspired by the Film
2021	"Getaway"	Vincint	There Will Be Tears
2026	"postcard"	Hayley Kiyoko	girls like girls the album

=== Demos ===
Year	Name
1998	Yellow tape
1998	Orange tape
1998	Red tape
2008	The Con Demos

== Music videos ==
Year	Name	Director
2000	"The First"	Sean Michael Turrell
2002	"I Hear Noises"	Sean Michael Turrell
2003	"Monday Monday Monday"	Christopher Mills
2003	"Living Room"	Kaare Andrews
2004	"Walking with a Ghost"	Troy Nixey
2005	"Speak Slow"	Tegan Quin/Angela Kendall/Brian Dutkewich
2007	"Back in Your Head"	Jamie Travis
2007	"The Con"	Suzie Vlcek
2008	"Call It Off"	Angela Kendall
2009	"Hell"	Jamie Travis
2010	"Alligator"	Marc De Pape
2010	"On Directing"	Angela Kendall
2010	"Northshore"	Angela Kendall
2012	"Closer"	Isaac Rentz
2013	"I Was a Fool"	Shane Drake
2013	"Goodbye, Goodbye"	Natalie Rae Robison
2016	"Boyfriend"	Clea DuVall
2016	"U-Turn"	Seth Bogart
2016	"100x"	Jess Rona
2016	"BWU"	Clea DuVall
2016	"Faint of Heart"	Devon Kirkpatrick
2016	"Hang On to the Night"	Lisa Hanawalt
2016	"White Knuckles"	Minister Akins
2016	"Stop Desire"	Allister Ann
2016	"Dying to Know"	Nathan Boey
2016	"That Girl"	Allister Ann
2019	"I'll Be Back Someday"	Natalie Fält
2022	"Yellow"	Mark Myers
2022	"Faded Like a Feeling"	Mark Myers
2022	"I Can't Grow Up"	Mark Myers
2022	"Smoking Weed Alone"	Mark Myers
