= Sex for Safety =

Studio album by The Inevitable Backlash
- Released: March 27, 2007
- Recorded: November–December 2006 at Wetandry, Eagle Rock
- Genre: Indie rock
- Length: 9:45
- Label: Hegemony
- Producer: Manny Nieto

Professional ratings
Review scores
Source	Rating
Delusions of Adequacy	Unrated
Treble	Unrated

Sex for Safety is The Inevitable Backlash's first studio album. It was released on March 27, 2007.

== Track listing ==
All tracks are written by The Inevitable Backlash (John Renton, Jason Mackenroth, Chris Stein).

No.	Title	Length
1.	"He Never Left"	2:50
2.	"Cult of the Sea"	1:53
3.	"Le Fou Rire"	2:33
4.	"Snowstorms"	3:19
5.	"Sex for Safety"	2:17

== Personnel ==
- John Renton - guitar/vocals
- Chris Stein - bass
- John Renton - drums
- Manny Nieto - Producer
- Mark Chalecki - Mastering

== Artwork ==
The CD cover for Sex for Safety EP is a digitally rendered watercolor sketch by Tegan and Sara art director EE Storey.
