= Emy Storey =

Graphic designer

Emily "Emy" Storey (born March 31, 1981) is a Montreal-based art director, graphic designer and illustrator. Born in Kinderhook, New York, Storey moved to Montreal to study Design Art at Concordia University, where she received her Fine Arts degree in 2003. Storey's company, Storey Elementary, produces graphic and website design, develops logos, ads, promotional items, band merchandise and album art for clients that include Showtime, Atlantic Records, Warner Music Group, Sanctuary Records, Vapor Records, Maverick Records and Superclose Music. Storey has also designed limited edition shoes for DC Shoes and Macbeth Footwear. Storey has worked with several non-profit organizations as an organizer and as a graphic designer. She is co-founder of Revel and Riot, an LGBT organization.

== Album art ==
- Death Cab for Cutie -Codes and Keys
- Death Cab for Cutie -Narrow Stairs
- Death Cab for Cutie -Cath...
- Death Cab for Cutie -The Open Door EP
- Tegan and Sara - So Jealous
- Tegan and Sara - The Con
- Tegan and Sara - Sainthood
- Tegan and Sara - Heartthrob
- The Rentals - The Last Little Life EP
- The Inevitable Backlash - Sex for Safety
- The Reason - Things Couldn't Be Better
- Melissa Ferrick - In The Eyes Of Strangers
- Rachael Cantu - Run All Night

== Clients ==
- Death Cab for Cutie
- Paramore
- Tegan and Sara
- The Tragically Hip
- First Aid Kit
- The Rentals
- Augustana
- Liam Lynch
- Melissa Ferrick
- DC Shoes
- Soundscreen Design
- Yellow Bird Project
