= Hang On to the Night =

Hang On to the Night may refer to:

- "Hang On to the Night", song by XTC from White Music (1978)
- "Hang On to the Night", song by Tegan and Sara from Love You to Death (2016)
