= Walking with a Ghost =

Walking with a Ghost may refer to:

- "Walking with a Ghost", a song by Tegan and Sara from their 2004 album So Jealous
  - Walking with a Ghost, a 2005 EP by the White Stripes featuring a cover version of this song
