= Get Along (video album) =

Live album by Tegan and Sara
- Released: November 15, 2011
- Recorded: Vancouver, British Columbia
- Studio: The Warehouse Studios
- Genre: Indie rock
- Length: 49:44 (music)
- Label: Warner Bros.

Get Along is the third DVD released by Canadian indie rock duo Tegan and Sara. It was released November 15, 2011 by Warner Bros. Records and was reissued on vinyl in April 2012. Get Along is a collection of three films and a live album.

The first film, States, is a 30-minute documentary that showcases American touring footage and interviews with Tegan and Sara, detailing the early stages of their career and interactions with their fans. The second film, India, is a 25-minute documentary shot during Tegan and Sara's tour of India, utilising interview footage with the band as well as their family and friends. The third film, For the Most Part, is a 70-minute stripped-down studio concert, shot before a live audience of 75 people over two days at The Warehouse Studios in Vancouver.

Get Along was nominated for Best Long Form Music Video at the 2013 Grammy Awards, but lost to Big Easy Express by Edward Sharpe and the Magnetic Zeros.

== Track listing ==
The following is the track listing on the included live album.

All tracks are written by Sara Quin and Tegan Quin.

No.	Title	Length
1.	"Alligator"	3:00
2.	"I Know I Know I Know"	3:02
3.	"Monday Monday Monday"	3:36
4.	"I Hear Noises"	3:27
5.	"Night Watch"	2:59
6.	"Back in Your Head"	3:43
7.	"Divided"	3:15
8.	"Call It Off"	2:38
9.	"Relief Next to Me"	3:49
10.	"The Ocean"	3:21
11.	"Nineteen"	3:19
12.	"Knife Going In"	2:29
13.	"Not with You"	3:45
14.	"I Won't Be Left"	3:12
15.	"Sentimental Tune"	4:09
Total length:		49:44

== Awards and nominations ==
Ceremony	Award	Result
2012 Juno Awards	Music DVD of the Year	Nominated
2013 Grammy Awards	Best Long Form Music Video	Nominated

== Reception ==
Get Along has received mixed reviews. Allie Conti of Paste stated that "Get Along has something to offer everyone, no matter where they lie on the spectrum of fandom", while SheWired's Ariel Shepherd-Oppenheim stated that "overall, the films were a bit of a disappointment. I wanted to learn more about them, and I didn't really feel like I did." A review in Consequence of Sound criticised the repetitive nature of some of the included songs, but concluded that "...imperfections and the occasional lack of focus aside, Get Along is a thoughtful gift to (Tegan and Sara) fans, who will no doubt cherish it." James Christopher Monger of AllMusic wrote that the live album "finds the duo waltzing through its 15-year career with the kind of ease and amiable confidence that can only come from longtime friends who also happen to be siblings."

== Charts ==
Chart (2011)	Peak position
US Billboard 200	116
US Top Alternative Albums (Billboard)	14
US Top Rock Albums (Billboard)	20

== Release history ==
Country	Date	Format	Label	Catalog No.	Ref.
Worldwide	November 15, 2011	CD	Warner Bros.	9362495381	
Worldwide	November 15, 2011	Digital download	Vapor; Warner Bros.	—N/a	
Worldwide	April 21, 2012	Vinyl	Vapor	Not listed	
