= Crybaby (Tegan and Sara album) =

Studio album by Tegan and Sara
- Released: October 21, 2022
- Studio: Studio Litho (Seattle); Sargent Recorders (Los Angeles)
- Length: 40:08
- Label: Mom + Pop
- Producer: John Congleton; Tegan and Sara

Tegan and Sara chronology
Hey, I'm Just Like You (2019)	Crybaby (2022)

Singles from Crybaby
- 1. "Fucking Up What Matters" Released: April 28, 2022; 2. "Yellow" Released: July 12, 2022; 3. "Faded Like a Feeling" Released: August 24, 2022; 4. "I Can't Grow Up" Released: September 27, 2022; 5. "Smoking Weed Alone" Released: October 19, 2022

Professional ratings
Aggregate scores
Source	Rating
Metacritic	74/100
Review scores
Source	Rating
And It Don't Stop	B+
The Daily Telegraph	4/5 stars
The Line of Best Fit	7/10
NME	4/5 stars
Pitchfork	6.1/10

Crybaby is the tenth studio album by Canadian indie pop duo Tegan and Sara, released via Mom + Pop Music on October 21, 2022. It is their first full-length studio album release since 2019's Hey, I'm Just Like You.

== Background ==
Tegan and Sara wrote the majority of the songs for the album in 2020, during the COVID-19 pandemic.

In 2021, during production and script writing for the then-upcoming TV series High School, based on their 2019 memoir of the same name, Tegan and Sara entered the studio with producer John Congleton to record demos of "I Can't Grow Up" and "All I Wanted". The songs were initially intended as standalone singles, but during the first day of recording with Congleton, the duo became inspired to pivot the one-off studio session into the creation of their tenth studio album.

== Promotion ==
Before the album's release, part of the song "Faded Like a Feeling" was featured in the 2022 Hulu film Crush.

Tegan and Sara announced the album on July 12, 2022.

On September 7, 2022, the duo appeared on Late Night with Seth Meyers, where they were interviewed about their TV show High School and the then-upcoming album, Crybaby. They performed the single "Yellow" live on the show.

On October 27, 2022, Tegan and Sara were musical guests on the Tonight Show Starring Jimmy Fallon, performing the single "I Can't Grow Up" live.

== Track listing ==
Crybaby track listing
No.	Title	Writer(s)	Length
1.	"I Can't Grow Up"	Sara Quin; Tegan Quin	3:20
2.	"All I Wanted"	T. Quin; S. Quin	3:17
3.	"Fucking Up What Matters"	T. Quin; S. Quin; John Congleton	2:52
4.	"Yellow"	T. Quin; S. Quin; Congleton	3:48
5.	"Smoking Weed Alone"	T. Quin; S. Quin; Ossama Al Sarraf; Ned Shepard	3:11
6.	"Faded Like a Feeling"	T. Quin; S. Quin	3:22
7.	"I'm Okay"	T. Quin; S. Quin; Congleton	3:21
8.	"Pretty Shitty Time"	T. Quin; S. Quin	3:29
9.	"Under My Control"	T. Quin; S. Quin; Congleton	3:14
10.	"This Ain't Going Well"	T. Quin; S. Quin	2:58
11.	"Sometimes I See Stars"	T. Quin; S. Quin; Congleton	3:32
12.	"Whatever That Was"	T. Quin; S. Quin; Caleb Shreve; Howard Redekopp	3:40
Total length:			40:08

== Personnel ==
Tegan and Sara

- Tegan Quin – vocals, guitar, production
- Sara Quin – vocals, guitar, keyboards, sampling, production

Additional personnel

- John Congleton – production, mixing, engineering, bass, drum programming, guitar, keyboards
- Joey Waronker – drums, percussion
- Luke Reynolds – bass, guitar, keyboards
- Emily Lazar – mastering
- Chris Allgood – mastering
- Emy Storey – art direction, design, photography
- Becca McFarlane – design, photography
- Pamela Littky – photography

== Charts ==
Chart performance for Crybaby
Chart (2022)	Peak position
UK Album Downloads (OCC)	47
US Top Album Sales (Billboard)	24
