= Fools (The Reason album) =

Studio album by the Reason
- Released: August 24, 2010
- Genres: Rock, alternative rock, indie rock
- Label: Anthem
- Producer: Steven Haigler

The Reason chronology
Things Couldn't Be Better (2005)	Fools (2010)

Singles from Fools
- 1. "The Longest Highway Home" Released: 2011; 2. "Where Do We Go From Here?" Released: 2011

Fools is the third studio album by Canadian rock band, the Reason.

Writing for Exclaim!, Travis Persaud described it as "a down-tempo album with melodies and textures hidden behind seemingly simplistic, radio-friendly jams".

== Track listing ==
1. "Come and Go" - 5:22
2. "Where Do We Go From Here" - 3:36
3. "Run" - 3:16
4. "Cry Like The Rain" - 3:40
5. "That's All I Know" - 3:50
6. "The Ending Of Us All" - 3:06
7. "Dogs" - 3:28
8. "Work With Me" - 4:23
9. "I'll Be Around" - 3:27
10. "My Love Is Gone" - 3:42
11. "The Longest Highway Home" - 3:33

- produced and engineered by Steven Haigler | -engineered by Jon Ashley | - Mixed by Vic Florencia, except "Come & Go" mixed by Steven Haigler
