= I'll Take the Blame =

EP by Tegan and Sara
- Released: November 13, 2007
- Genre: New wave, indie pop
- Length: 13:24
- Producer: Tegan and Sara

Tegan and Sara chronology
The Con (2007)	I'll Take the Blame (2007)	Sainthood (2009)

I'll Take the Blame is the second major EP released by indie rock/new wave/indie pop group Tegan and Sara. The EP was first sold at shows during Tegan and Sara's fall 2008 tour of the United States.

PunkNews.org rated it 3/5, for fans only, criticising some of the material as second-rate.

== Track listing ==
1. "Back in Your Head" (Sara Quin)
2. "Back in Your Head" (Tiësto Remix)
3. "One Second" (Tegan Quin)
4. "I Take All the Blame" (S. Quin)
