= Ravenna (album) =

Studio album by The Reason
- Released: 13 September 2004
- Genres: Post-Hardcore; Emo; Rock
- Label: Smallman Records

The Reason chronology
Problems Associated With Running (2003)	Ravenna (2004)	Things Couldn't Be Better (2007)

Ravenna is the first studio album by Canadian rock band The Reason, and was released on September 13, 2004. It was recorded in Burlington, Ontario at The Music Gym. Ravenna was produced by Luke Marshall and The Reason, and the only album to feature bassist Sean Palmer and Erik Mikalauskas on guitar and vocals.

== Track listing ==
1. "Reclaiming The Throne"
2. "The Joke and the Gentleman"
3. "A Timeless Classic"
4. "Papercuts and Exit Wounds"
5. "150"
6. "My Prescription"
7. "Subways In Pittsburgh"
8. "Red Sky At Dawn"
9. "Afterparty At the Actor's Estate"
10. "Tortoise"

== Personnel ==
- Adam White - Vocals
- James Nelan - Guitar
- Erik Mikalauskas - Guitar
- Sean Palmer - Bass
- Cam Bordignon - Drums
- Luke Marshall - Producer
- Mike Borkosky - Mixing
