= My Two Brooks =

Studio album by The Inevitable Backlash
- Released: 2009
- Genre: Rock
- Length: 30:43
- Label: Hegemony

The Inevitable Backlash chronology
My Two Brooks (2009)	Boys Got A Future (2011)

My Two Brooks is an album by the American rock band The Inevitable Backlash that was released in 2009.

== Track listing ==
All tracks are written by Yo Momma

No.	Title	Length
1.	"Academia"	3:15
2.	"Moscow Bride"	2:24
3.	"Liz Pavle"	2:37
4.	"Joanna As A Girl"	3:49
5.	"Strawberry Rainbow Tan"	2:50
6.	"Silence Comes"	3:53
7.	"Philenbus"	2:12
8.	"Abby's Face"	3:13
9.	"Diego Rivera"	3:58
10.	"My Two Brooks"	2:32
