= Alligator (Tegan and Sara song) =

Single by Tegan and Sara

from the album Sainthood
- B-side: "Passion Pit Remix"
- Released: October 26, 2009
- Recorded: 2009
- Genre: Disco
- Length: 2:41
- Label: Vapor; Sire
- Songwriters: Tegan Quin; Sara Quin

Tegan and Sara singles chronology
"Hell" (2009)	"Alligator" (2009)	"Feel It in My Bones" (2010)

"Alligator" is the second single taken from Canadian rock duo Tegan and Sara's sixth studio album Sainthood (2009). It was originally released in the United Kingdom in October 2009, a day before the release of the album, as a digital download. In March 2010, the single was released 17 track remix album in the United Kingdom, United States and Canada as a digital download and 12" vinyl. The single charted at number 32 in the Billboard Hot Dance Club Songs.

Sara has stated that the song "was the first song I wrote for Tegan and Sara that didn't involve guitar whatsoever. There were lots of songs I'd written where I took guitars out or fooled with the instrumentation later on, but Alligator was the first song that I sat down and wrote without even thinking of the guitar. I picked a piano riff that I thought was cool, looped it, and just started building from there."

== Critical reception ==
"Alligator" received positive reactions from critics. AllMusic writer Tim Sendra called the song "catchy", while BBC said "Sara's songs are woozy, inventive, heavily electronic affairs: cold, stark opener "Arrow", the seasick, disembodied "Night Watch" and the baroque disco of "Alligator" are all her tracks and all album highlights." Pitchfork Media said in a review of the album that ""On Directing" or "Alligator"" were "two obvious album highlights", and in a review of the track itself by Dan Weiss said "Nothing on Gossip's club-oriented new album will sound as good on the floor as the "over you, over you" chants designed to negate the alligator tears of the title here".

== Music video ==
The video for "Alligator" starts off with Sara lying in a bed covered in snow, and Tegan inside of an igloo as they both sing the song. Sara then walks over to the igloo and takes out a brick to see Tegan. The igloo then collapses, and Sara tries to find Tegan in the bricks. She finds her and pulls her out, and they then lie atop the bricks. Interspersed with these scenes are scenes of Tegan and Sara dancing, first on their own and later with other people.

== Track listing ==
Digital download

1. "Alligator" – 2:41
2. Passion Pit Remix – 3:07
3. Holy Fuck Remix – 3:23
4. Four Tet Remix – 5:19
5. Murge Remix – 2:14

Alligator (Remixes)

1. Automatic Panic Extended Remix – 5:06
2. Bill Hamel Dub – 6:40
3. Dave Sitek Remix – 3:39
4. Doveman Remix – 3:19
5. Hi-Def Remix – 3:37
6. Josh Harris Club Remix – 6:31
7. Kevin St. Croix Remix – 8:24
8. Mad Decent K.K.S Remix – 5:50
9. Toro y Moi Remix – 4:08
10. VHS or Beta Remix – 5:20

Digital and vinyl

1. Holy Fuck Remix – 3:23
2. Passion Pit Remix – 3:07
3. Toro y Moi Remix – 4:08
4. VHS or Beta Remix – 5:20
5. Doveman Remix – 3:19
6. Four Tet Remix – 5:19
7. Murge Remix – 2:14
8. Ra Ra Riot Remix – 2:47
9. Automatic Panic Extended Remix – 5:06
10. Hi-Def Remix – 3:37
11. Dave Sitek Remix – 3:39
12. Sara's Demo – 2:41

Digital album bonus tracks

1. Morgan Page Remix – 8:04
2. Kevin St. Croix Remix – 8:24
3. Mad Decent K.K.S Remix – 5:50
4. Josh Harris Club Remix – 6:31
5. Hamel Remix – 6:40

== Charts ==
Chart performance for "Alligator"
Chart (2010)	Peak position
US Dance Club Songs (Billboard)	32

== Release history ==
Release history for "Alligator"
Region	Date	Edition
United Kingdom	26 October 2009	Standard
United States, Canada	29 March 2010	Remix album
United Kingdom	29 March 2010	Remix album
United Kingdom	18 June 2010	Alligator (Remixes)
