= Kitsilano Pool =

Outdoor saltwater swimming pool in Vancouver, Canada

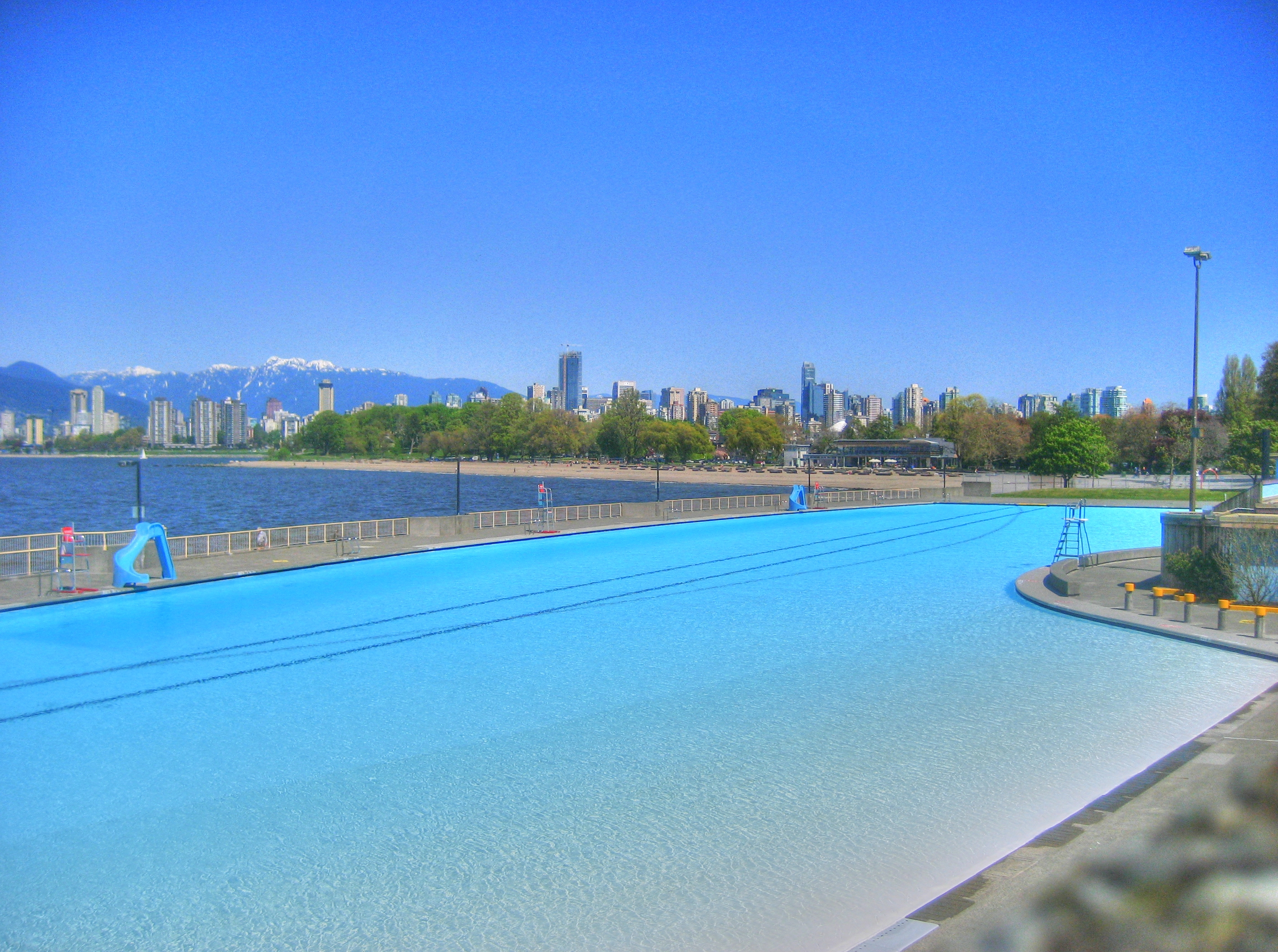
Kitsilano Pool

Kitsilano Pool is an outdoor saltwater swimming pool, located at Kitsilano Beach in Vancouver, Canada. At 137 metres long, it is the longest outdoor swimming pool in North America.

== History ==
Kitsilano Pool is situated at an area known to the Coast Salish people as Skwa-yoos, at the site of a former shell midden.

Kitsilano Pool opened 15 August 1931 by BC Provincial Attorney-General R.L. (Royal Lethington) Maitland and Vancouver Park Board chair Fred Crone, and originally was billed as "America's Largest Swimming Pool". The original pool was an elliptical shape, 660 by 200 feet (201 by 61 meters) and 2–8 feet deep, covering 2.3 acres, and containing 1.3 million litres of water. The project cost $50,000 at the time. It was filled by tidal water from English Bay and sealife such as mud sharks and octopuses were occasionally found in the pool. It was designed as a spot for bathers to swim during low tide and had a sandy bottom until the 1960s, when it was filled with concrete. 5,000 people showed up on the opening day to experience the new oceanside swimming pool.

To commemorate Vancouver's 50th birthday in 1936, a diving board was installed at the pool.

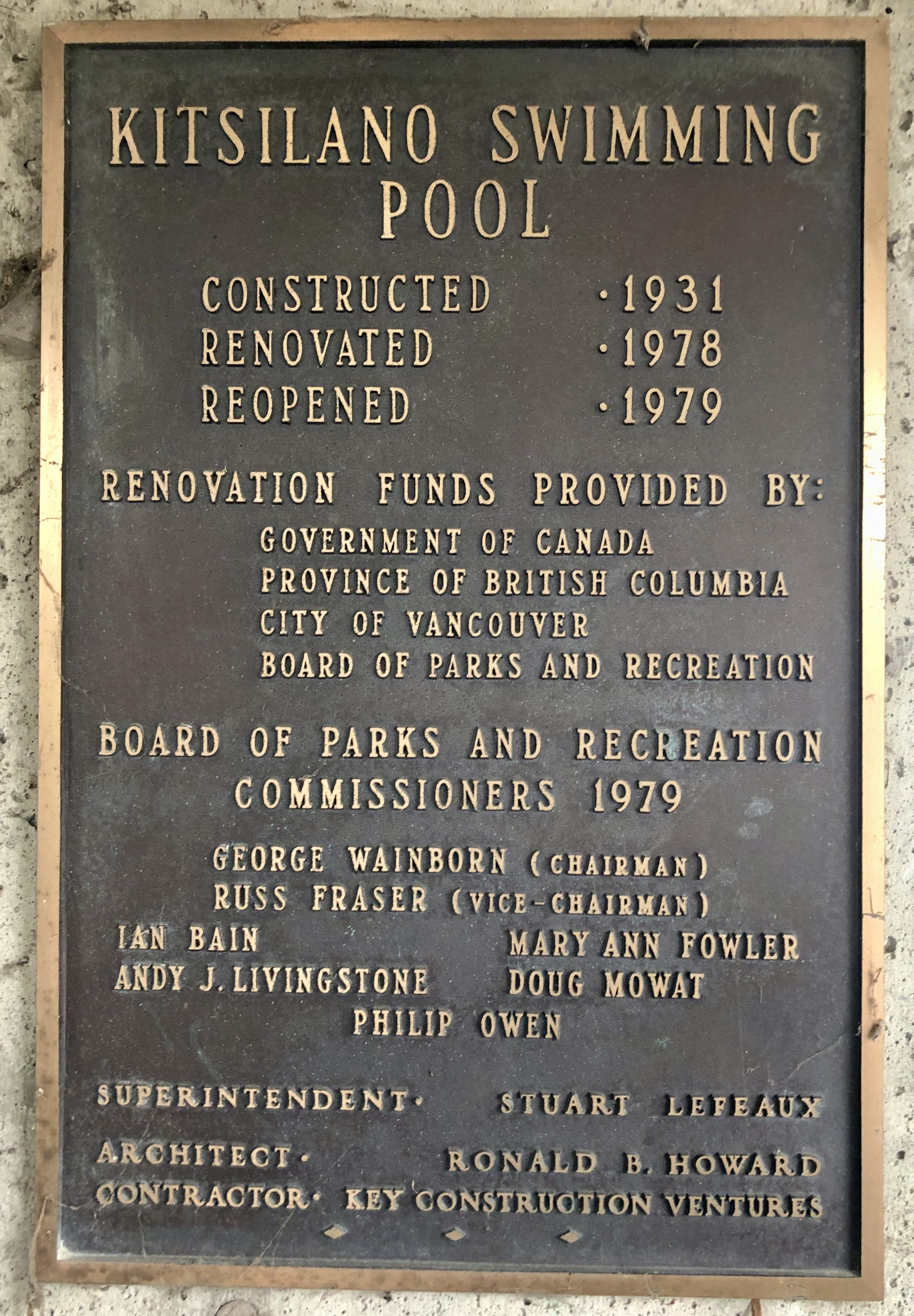
Opening plaque for 1978 upgrade

In 1978, the pool was replaced with the current design due to health concerns because of a lack of water circulation. The construction started in November 1977 and was scheduled to be completed by 15 July 1978 but, due to delays, was not completed until September 1978. This was too late for the summer swim season, so the new Kitsilano Pool opening was delayed until 1979. Designed by architect Ronald B. Howard and built at a cost of $2.2 million by Key Construction Ventures, the new pool featured heated water and a pump that pumped saltwater into the pool from English Bay. A seawall walkway around Kits pool was constructed at the same time.

In 2018 Kitsilano Pool underwent a major upgrade to reduce the amount of potable water used by the pool by 80%. The upgrade cost $3.3 million, $500,000 of which was paid by the government of Canada, and the remainder by the City of Vancouver. The pool basin membrane and caulking were replaced, and repairs were done on the gutter and pool deck structure.

In 2023, a Vancouver Park Board feasibility study found that the pool was leaking approximately 30,000 litres of water an hour. In May 2024, the pool opening was delayed due to "unforeseen repairs".

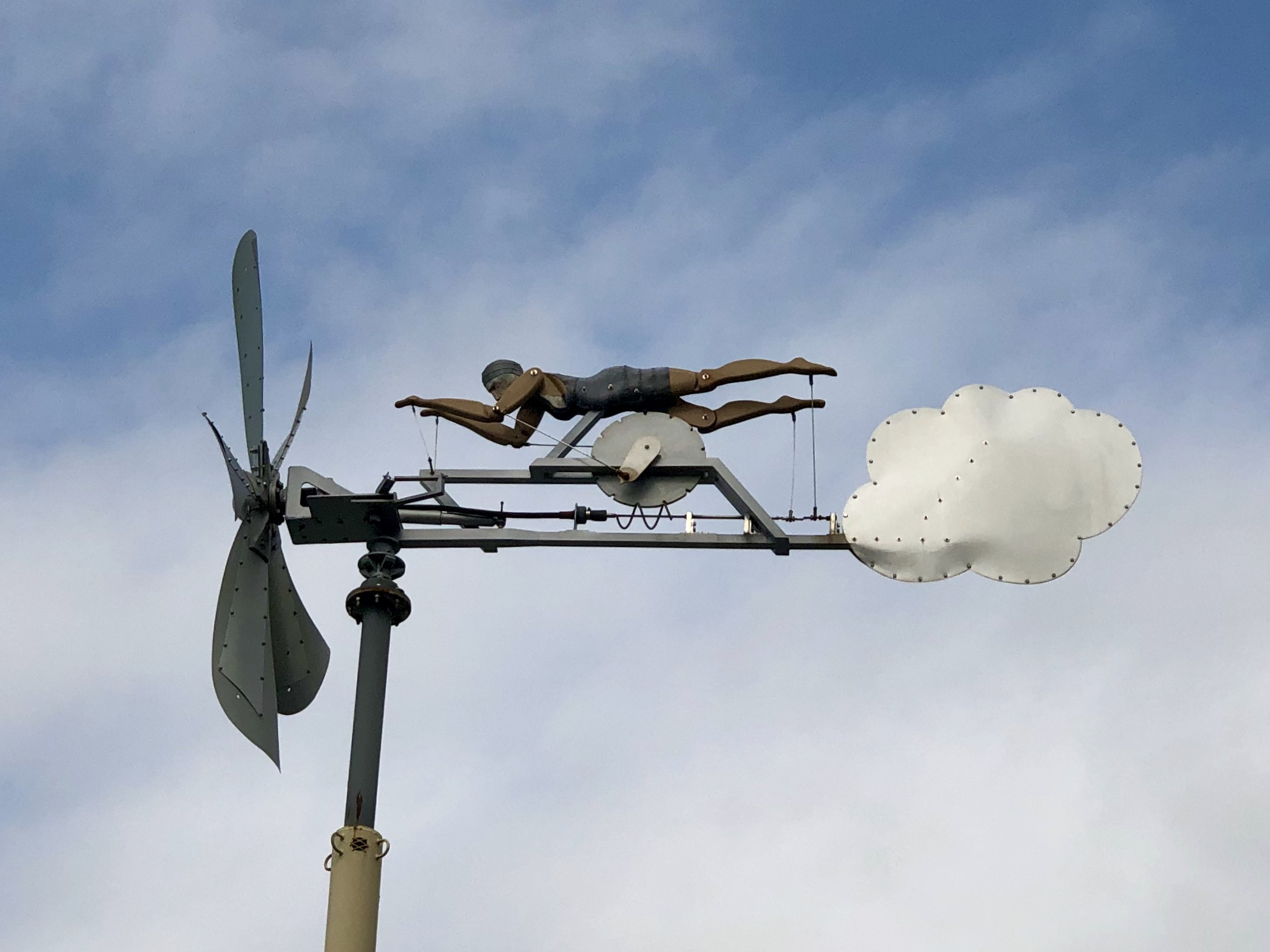
Wind Swimmer at Kitsilano pool, sculpted by Douglas R. Taylor and installed 22 April 1996

== Today ==
Today, Kitsilano pool is a popular swimming spot in Vancouver, operated by the Vancouver Board of Parks and Recreation. The pool normally opens on the Victoria Day long weekend and remains open until mid to late September. It is divided into three sections: a shallow section for children and family swimming, roped-off lanes for lap swimming and exercising, and a deep end for casual swimming. The pool was closed for majority of summer 2024 due to needed repairs, but reopened on 7 August 2024. The City of Vancouver has stated the Kitsilano pool is at the end of its service life, and beginning in June 2025 they are seeking public input on the future of the pool.

== Awards and recognition ==
- Third on Red Bull's list of "The Top 10 Sexiest Swimming Pools to Train in" (2018)
- CNN Travel's "World's Best Tidal and Oceanside Pools" (2019)
- CNN Travel's "20 of the World's Best Places for Swimming" (2020)
