= Sainthood (album) =

Studio album by Tegan and Sara
- Released: October 26, 2009
- Recorded: Mid-2009
- Studio: Sound City, Los Angeles, California; Two Sticks Audio, Seattle, Washington, United States
- Length: 36:55
- Label: Sire
- Producer: Chris Walla; Howard Redekopp

Tegan and Sara chronology
I'll Take the Blame (2007)	Sainthood (2009)	2010 Summer Tour (2010)

Singles from Sainthood
- 1. "Hell" Released: October 2, 2009; 2. "Alligator" Released: October 26, 2009

Sainthood is the sixth studio album by the Canadian indie pop duo Tegan and Sara, released in the UK on October 26, 2009, and in the US on October 27, by Sire Records.

The album was a shortlisted nominee for the 2010 Polaris Music Prize.

== Background ==
This is the first album by Tegan and Sara to feature a song co-written by the pair, as they usually choose to write separately. However, it was not written while Tegan and Sara stayed together in New Orleans as an attempt to write together. No songs from that time made it on to the album, although one such song lends its title to that of the record. The album title was inspired by a Leonard Cohen lyric. The record also includes co-written songs from Tegan's side project with Hunter Burgan, bassist of AFI.

The album is described by the band as such:

Tegan and Sara's sixth studio album – Sainthood – addresses secular themes of devotion, delusion, and exemplary behavior in the pursuit of love and relationships. Inspired by emotional longing and the quiet actions we hope may be noticed by the objects of our affection, Sainthood is about obsession with romantic ideals.

In the service of relationships we practice being perfect. We practice our sainthood in the hope that we will be rewarded with adoration. As we are driven to become anything for someone else, we sometimes become martyrs for our cause.

Love, like faith, can never be held in an individual's hands. But the story of a great love affair – especially one that is unrequited or has ended too soon – can be woven like scripture or a bedtime story. And so the themes of Sainthood are tied together by this simple title, borrowed, with great respect, from the lyrics of the Leonard Cohen song "Came So Far for Beauty":

I practiced all my sainthood / I gave to one and all / But the rumours of my virtue / They moved her not at all.

== Release ==
Sainthood was released in the UK on October 26, 2009.

The album was produced by Death Cab for Cutie guitarist Chris Walla and was tracked at Sound City Studios in Los Angeles and Two Sticks Audio in Seattle during the summer of 2009.

Tegan and Sara released the full album for online streaming on their MySpace page on October 20, 2009.

EE Storey, the band's artistic director, designed the album artwork.

When speaking with Alter the Press! in November 2009, the band revealed that the second single to be lifted from Sainthood would be "Alligator".

== Critical reception ==
Professional ratings
Review scores
Source	Rating
AllMusic	3.5/5 stars
Alter the Press!	5/5 stars
The A.V. Club	A−
Pitchfork	7.3/10
PopMatters	6/10
Robert Christgau	A−
Rolling Stone	3.5/5 stars
Slant Magazine	4/5 stars
Spin	4/5 stars

The album was generally well received by critics, scoring 78 out of 100 from 17 reviews on review aggregator Metacritic.

Their song "Hell" came in at number 99 on the Australian Triple J Hottest 100, 2009.

== Commercial performance ==
In Canada, Sainthood debuted at number four on the Canadian Albums Chart. The album was certified gold by Music Canada denoting sales of over 40,000 copies in Canada. In the United States, The album debuted at number 21 on the US Billboard 200, selling 22,665 copies in its first week. As of December 2013, the album has sold 115,000 copies in the United States.

== Track listing ==
All tracks are written by Tegan Quin and Sara Quin, except where noted

No.	Title	Length
1.	"Arrow"	3:06
2.	"Don't Rush" (T. Quin, S. Quin, Hunter Burgan)	2:43
3.	"Hell" (T. Quin, S. Quin, Burgan)	3:24
4.	"On Directing"	2:46
5.	"Red Belt"	2:11
6.	"The Cure" (T. Quin, S. Quin, Burgan)	3:22
7.	"Northshore"	2:04
8.	"Night Watch"	2:33
9.	"Alligator"	2:42
10.	"Paperback Head"	2:38
11.	"The Ocean"	3:06
12.	"Sentimental Tune"	3:23
13.	"Someday"	2:57
Total length:		36:55

Bonus tracks

iTunes deluxe edition
No.	Title	Length
14.	"Wrists"	2:48
15.	"Light Up"	2:19
Total length:		42:02

iTunes preorder edition
No.	Title	Length
16.	"It Was Midnight"	2:03
Total length:		44:05

== Personnel ==
- Howard Redekopp – production, engineering
- Chris Walla – production, mixing (tracks: 1, 7, 11)
- Dave Sardy – mixing (tracks: 2, 3, 4, 5, 6, 8, 9, 10, 12, 13)
- Stephen Marcussen – mastering
- Andrew Maury – Logic operator
- Adam Fuller – Sound City assistant
- Jackson Long – Two Sticks assistant
- Alec Gomez – assistance
- Andy Brohard – engineering

== Charts ==
Chart performance for Sainthood
Chart (2009)	Peak position
Australian Albums (ARIA)	21
Belgian Albums (Ultratop Flanders)	92
Canadian Albums (Billboard)	4
US Billboard 200	21
US Top Alternative Albums (Billboard)	7

== Certifications ==
Certifications and sales for Sainthood
Region	Certification	Certified units/sales
Canada (Music Canada)	Gold	40,000^{^}
United States	—	115,000
^{^} Shipments figures based on certification alone.
