= The Reason (band) =

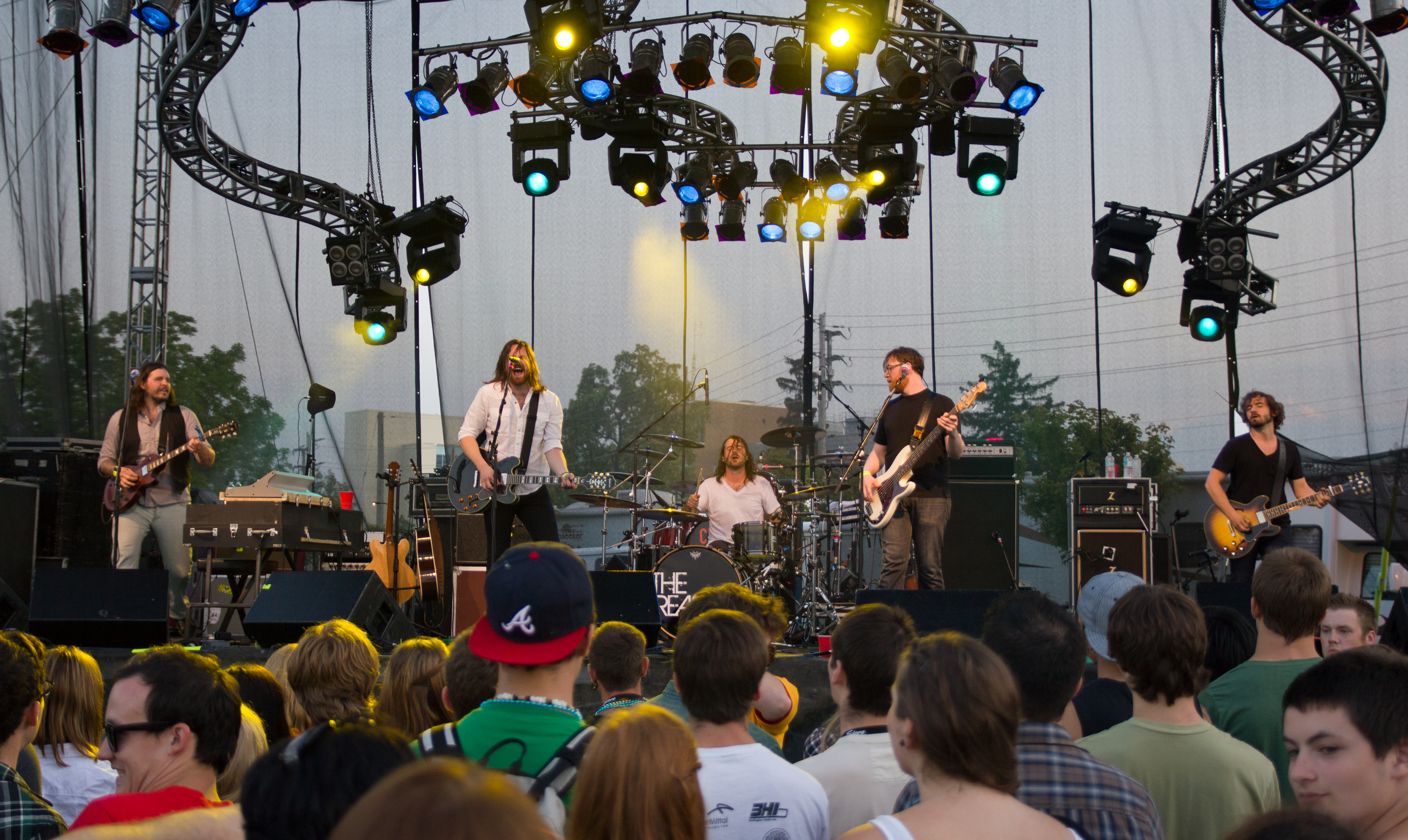
- Performing at the 2011 Burlington Sound of Music festival

Background information
- Origin: Hamilton, Ontario, Canada
- Genres: Indie rock; rock; emo; post-hardcore (early)
- Years active: 2003 – present
- Labels: Smallman, Anthem
- Members: Adam White; James Nelan; Ronson Armstrong; Serge Sargento
- Past members: Sean Palmer; Erik Mikalauskas; Joe "Juice" Demars; Cam Bordignon; Jeremy Widerman; Steve Kiely; Mike Caputo; Christopher Swinney

The Reason is a Canadian rock band, formed by Adam White and James Nelan in 2003 in Hamilton, Ontario.

== History ==
Adam White (vocals) and James "Cubby" Nelan (guitar) formed The Reason in late 2003 after the passing of their punk rock band, Sewing With Nancie. Eventually adding Erik Mikalauskas (guitar), Cam Bordignon (drums; who replaced original drummer Joe Demars) and Sean Palmer (bass), The Reason began to write songs and immediately released their first EP - Problems Associated With Running. The band replaced Mikalauskas with Jeremy Widerman on guitar shortly afterwards, and went on tour. They soon signed to Smallman Records & Management after the label witnessed the band performing a concert. In the 12 months that followed they played over 200 shows across Canada and the northern USA.

They released their first full-length album, Ravenna, on Smallman Records in 2004, which helped them join tours with Alexisonfire, Boys Night Out, Murphy's Law, No Use for A Name and Strung Out, and shows at CMW, Wakefest, Edgefest, and Wakestock. The album combined aggressive pop with punk that triggered comparisons to Grade and early Get Up Kids. According to Chart Magazine, The Reason had "sharpened their attack, tightened up arrangements and honed their harmonies to precision-drilled perfection"

In 2005, The Reason replaced Sean Palmer with Ronson Armstrong on bass and started work on their next release, patiently writing and recording songs over the next two years. They attracted the attention of Juno-winning producer Gavin Brown (Billy Talent, Three Days Grace, Thornley), who agreed to work with The Reason "as a labour of love" after hearing the demo. With Brown's help, The Reason's album, Things Couldn't Be Better, was released March 20, 2007.

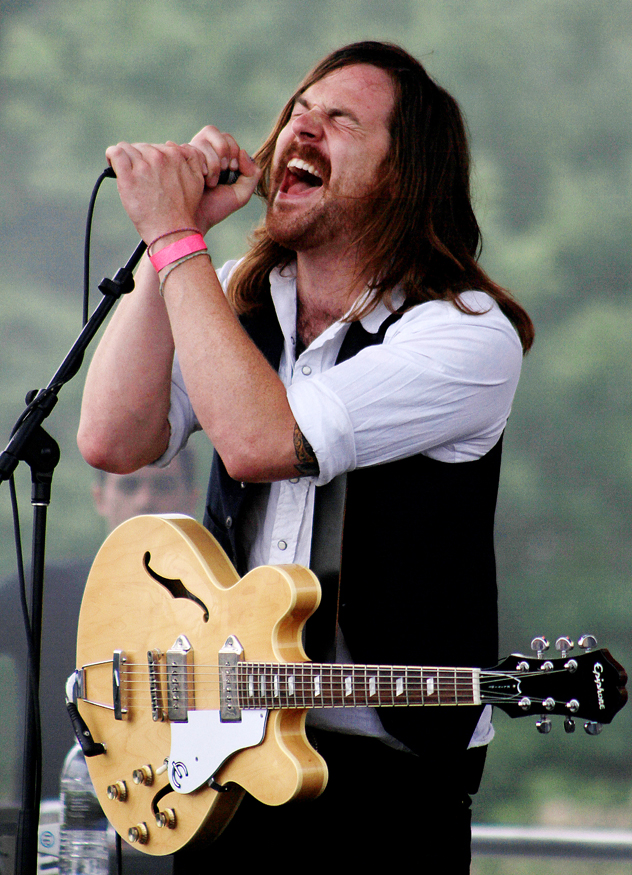
Adam White in August, 2011.

At the end of September 2008, the band announced via myspace that drummer Cam Bordignon had left the band during the writing process for Fools, their upcoming record. The split was amicable and it was also announced that close friend Steve Kiely was to replace Cam as the new permanent drummer for The Reason.

The band recorded Fools at Echo Mountain Studios in Asheville, North Carolina in November 2008. The month-long experience had a rejuvenating effect on the band, partly because of the great locale and partly because of the work of producer Steven Haigler (The Pixies, Brand New, Clutch). Haigler played a pivotal role in developing the band's new sound, which steered away from its previous heavier style.

In 2010, the band parted ways with Smallman and are now managed by SRO/Anthem (Rush, Thornley). They also said goodbye to guitarist Jeremy Widerman who went on to be a founding member of the band Monster Truck, who was replaced by Michael Caputo.

Fools was released on August 24, 2010, as the band begun a cross-Canada tour.

By 2012, The Reason were back in the studio working on their fourth studio release with Canadian producer Howard Redekopp (Mother Mother, Tegan & Sara, The New Pornographers). A Facebook update on June 26 stated, "Our new record is nearly done being mixed. More news to come!".

Near the end of 2012, the band released the first single off their 2013 EP release called "Drive Me Home". The song was the iTunes "Free Single of the Week" for the week of January 14, 2013. The band's new EP Hollow Tree was released on January 15, 2013. The EP contains 6 songs, including the single "Drive Me Home".

== Band members ==
- Adam White – lead vocals, guitar (2003–present)
- James Nelan – guitar, keyboards, backing vocals (2003–present)
- Ronson Armstrong – bass, backing vocals (2005–present)
- Serge Sargento – drums (2013–present)

Former members

- Sean Palmer – bass (2003–2005)
- Erik Mikalauskas – guitar (2003–2004)
- Joe "Juice" Demars – drums (2003–2004)
- Cam Bordignon – drums (2004–2008)
- Jeremy Widerman – guitar (2004–2010)
- Steve Kiely – drums (2009-2011)
- Mike Caputo – guitar (2009–2012)
- Christopher Swinney – Aux Guitar, Tour Manager (2004)

Session members

- Christopher Henry- Drums; Hollow Tree e.p. (2013)

== Discography ==
=== EPs ===
- Problems Associated with Running (2003)
- Hollow Tree (2013)
  - Produced, Mixed, & Engineered by Howard Redekopp
  - Track Listing
    1. Drive Me Home
    2. Those Days Are Dead
    3. Don't Fail Me
    4. Just So You Know
    5. Grow up
    6. Over Now

=== Albums ===
- Ravenna (2004)
- Things Couldn't Be Better (2006)
- Fools (2010)

=== Singles ===
Year	Title	Chart Positions	Album
Year	Title	CAN Rock	Album
2005	"150"	-	Ravenna
2007	"This Is Just the Beginning"	-	Things Couldn't Be Better
2007	"All I Ever Wanted"	-	Things Couldn't Be Better
2007	"We're So Beyond This"	-	Things Couldn't Be Better
2010	"The Longest Highway Home"	3	Fools
2011	"Where Do We Go from Here"	-	Fools
2012	"Drive Me Home"	11	Hollow Tree EP
2013	"Those Days Are Dead"	9	Hollow Tree EP

=== Music videos ===
Year	Title	Album	Director
2005	"150"	Ravenna	Marc Ricciardelli
2007	"This Is Just the Beginning"	Things Couldn't Be Better	Sean Michael Turrell
2007	"All I Ever Wanted"	Things Couldn't Be Better	Sean Michael Turrell
2007	"We're So Beyond This"	Things Couldn't Be Better	Sean Michael Turrell
2010	"The Longest Highway Home"	Fools	Micha Dahan
2011	"Where Do We Go from Here"	Fools	Micha Dahan

== Trivia ==
- Their official video for "We're So Beyond This" features Sara Quin of Tegan and Sara, who contributed vocals to the song.

== Interviews ==
- Interview With The Reason at Virgin Festival 2007- From Toronto Music Scene

== See also ==
- List of bands from Canada
