= If It Was You =

Studio album by Tegan and Sara
- Released: August 20, 2002
- Recorded: 1999–2001
- Genres: Alternative rock; indie rock; emo
- Length: 37:26
- Labels: Vapor; Sanctuary
- Producers: John Collins; David Carswell

Tegan and Sara chronology
This Business of Art (2000)	If It Was You (2002)	So Jealous (2004)

Professional ratings
Review scores
Source	Rating
Allmusic	3/5 stars
NOW	4/5 stars
PopMatters	(favorable)
Uncut	3/5 stars
The Village Voice	(choice cut)

If It Was You is the third studio album by Canadian indie pop duo Tegan and Sara, released on August 20, 2002. Officially, it is their second release through Vapor Records, though they independently released Under Feet Like Ours in 1999.

If It Was You was recorded on Galiano Island and the Factory Studio, with the exception of the track "And Darling (This Thing That Breaks My Heart)", which was recorded at Tegan's house.

An enhanced version of If It Was You was released on June 3, 2003. This version includes one bonus track ("Come On Kids"), two music videos ("Monday Monday Monday" and "I Hear Noises"), and two tour videos ("Born in the Eighties Tour" and "The Never-Ending Tour").

The singles released from this album include "Time Running", "I Hear Noises", and "Monday Monday Monday". A video of "Living Room" was directed by Kaare Andrews.

== Track listing ==
No.	Title	Writer(s)	Length
1.	"Time Running"	Tegan Quin	2:11
2.	"You Went Away"	T. Quin	2:00
3.	"Monday Monday Monday"	Sara Quin	3:18
4.	"City Girl"	T. Quin	4:02
5.	"Not Tonight"	S. Quin	2:37
6.	"Underwater"	S. Quin	2:50
7.	"I Hear Noises"	T. Quin	3:35
8.	"Living Room"	T. Quin	2:50
9.	"Terrible Storm"	S. Quin	3:28
10.	"And Darling (This Thing That Breaks My Heart)^{1}"	T. Quin	1:42
11.	"Want to Be Bad"	S. Quin	3:55
12.	"Don't Confess"	T. Quin	4:32

2003 re-release bonus track
No.	Title	Writer(s)	Length
13.	"Come On Kids"	T. Quin	2:52

== Personnel ==
- Tegan Quin – main performer, photography
- Sara Quin – main performer, album design and layout
- Gabe Cipes – bass guitar
- Rob Chursinoff – drums, percussion
- David Carswell – multi instruments, producer, mixing, engineer
- Michael Ledwidge – organ, keyboards, slide guitar
- Ezra Cipes – banjo
- Sheldon Zaharko – engineer
- Pascal Leclair – assistant engineer
- Steve Hall – mastering
- John Collins – multi instruments, mixing, producer, engineer
- Melanie – photography
- Demoe – album design and layout
- Kaare Andrews – cover photography and original ideas

== Song placement and cover versions ==
- "Time Running" would later be featured in the What's New Scooby Doo? episode, "Mummy Scares Best".
- In 2004, Matt Sharp and Maya Rudolph of The Rentals recorded a cover version of Tegan and Sara's song "Not Tonight" and released it for free on the Internet.

== Notes ==
1.The titles of the songs "And Darling (This Thing That Breaks My Heart)" and "Don't Confess" are often mixed up, in that the parenthesis stands next to "Don't Confess" instead of "And Darling". This can most likely be traced back to the track listing on the back of the CD, where the parenthesis is located under "And Darling", but next to "Don't Confess" (presumably for lack of space). The line "this thing that breaks my heart" can be found in the lyrics to "And Darling", however.
