= High School (book) =

Memoir by Sara Quin and Tegan Quin

- First edition cover
- Author: Sara Quin and Tegan Quin
- Audio read by: Sara Quin and Tegan Quin
- Language: English
- Subject: Memoir
- Publisher: Simon & Schuster Canada
- Publication date: September 24, 2019
- Publication place: Canada
- Media type: Print (hardcover)
- Pages: 384
- ISBN: 978-1-9821-1266-0
- Dewey Decimal: 782.42166092/2 B
- LC Class: ML421.T408 Q56 2019
- Website: teganandsara.com/highschool

High School is a 2019 memoir by twin sisters Sara Quin and Tegan Quin, of the Canadian indie pop group Tegan and Sara. It is their first book and was published on September 24, 2019, by Simon & Schuster Canada. It recounts their childhood and adolescence in Alberta as well as their musical beginnings. It was published three days before the release of their ninth studio album, Hey, I'm Just Like You, which contains re-recordings of unreleased songs that the duo recorded as teenagers.

The book received favorable reviews and won a 2020 Alex Award. In 2022, the book was adapted into the Amazon Freevee television series of the same name.

== Summary ==
The book covers the sisters' childhood and adolescence and their first relationships while growing up during the mid-1990s as queer teenagers in Calgary, Alberta. It also covers their musical beginnings, up until their career began to take off. It is written in alternating chapters from both Tegan's point of view and Sara's.

== Background ==
High School was announced on December 11, 2018, nine months ahead of its publication. It was first published on September 24, 2019, by Simon & Schuster Canada in Canada (ISBN 978-1-9821-1266-0); by MCD, an imprint of Farrar, Straus and Giroux, in the United States (ISBN 978-0-374-16994-7; and Virago Press (Hachette UK) in the United Kingdom (ISBN 978-0-349-01196-7).

The book was published three days before the release of Tegan and Sara's ninth studio album, Hey, I'm Just Like You, which contains re-recordings of unreleased demo songs that the duo recorded as teenagers. The album was conceived when Tegan and Sara unearthed the original cassette tapes after twenty years of being unheard, and they "recognized the songs as an essential part of [their] high school story."

== Reception ==
Jon Dolan of Rolling Stone praised the book, calling it "a quietly heroic rock and roll origin story" and writing, "Those explosively detailed depictions of their earliest experiences trying to find girlfriends are worthy of an excellent YA novel, thanks to Tegan or Sara's unsparingly real, matter-of-fact prose style." Spencer Kornhaber of The Atlantic wrote, "While Tegan and Sara are hilarious in their onstage banter, on the page their anecdotes read as spooky, solemn obstacle-running. A melancholy tone runs throughout. Queerness complicates what otherwise might seem like just hijinks."

Kirkus Reviews and Publishers Weekly gave the book positive reviews, but both magazines felt that the memoir would mostly appeal to those who are already fans of the band." Jancee Dunn, writing for The Washington Post, gave the book a positive review, calling the sisters "skilled writers with an eye for detail" and praising their account of their experience as twins and as teenagers, but lamented that the book suffered from the "stream-of-consciousness verbosity" of a diary.

The book debuted at number fifteen on The New York Times Hardcover Nonfiction best-sellers list for the week ending September 28, 2019. It won a 2020 Alex Award.

In 2023, the book was banned, in Clay County District Schools, Florida.

== Television adaptation ==
In 2020, it was announced that Brad Pitt's production company Plan B Entertainment had plans to produce a TV show adapted from the memoir. The pilot episode would be written, directed and executive produced by Clea Duvall. It premiered on Amazon Freevee on October 14, 2022.
