= The Inevitable Backlash =

American rock band

- Origin: Los Angeles, California, United States
- Genres: Alternative rock, indie rock
- Years active: 2006–present
- Labels: Hegemony Records (US); Wetandry (UK)
- Members: John Renton
- Past members: Jason Mackenroth; Chris Stein; Frances Miranda; Laena Myers-Ionita; Matt Grossman
- Website: http://theinevitablebacklash.tumblr.com

The Inevitable Backlash is a rock band based in Los Angeles, California. The band released their debut in March 2007. The Inevitable Backlash's lineup has changed frequently, with only singer John Renton, a former member of Abby's Gone remaining from the original incarnation. Past and current members have included Jason Mackenroth on drums, Matt E. Grossman on drums/percussion. Chris Stein, currently a member of Saccharine Trust on bass, Laena Myers Lonita of Residual Echoes and Starlight Desperation on bass.

The band released its first record in March 2007, the Sex for Safety. The group's style was compared to bands such as The Replacements and None More Black. It was recorded by Frances Miranda at Wetandry Studios on analog tape with zero overdubs. It was a critical success with Punk Planet magazine hailing it as "Rock and Roll enveloped with lyrical themes of the industry's most assured seller –sex" and the Providence Daily Dose and 75 or Less calling it "One of the ten best records of 2007".

After the release of Sex for Safety, the band embarked on the Sex for Safety Tour with members John Renton, Matt E. Grossman, and Laena Myers Lonita. It was chronicled in the tour for life tumblr blog on the band's official website.

In July 2010, one of the members of The Inevitable Backlash appeared on the Adam Carolla podcast in a segment called "Who the F*** Sells this S***?" in which Carolla speaks to someone selling random items on Craigslist. The member of the band was selling 86 beers for the best offer.

== Albums ==
- Sex for Safety (Hegemony Records, 2007 EP)
- My Two Brooks (Hegemony Records, 2009 LP)
- Gives You Hell (Hegemony Records, 2010 Single)
- Boys Got A Future (Hegemony Records, 2011 LP)
