= This Business of Art =

Studio album by Tegan and Sara
- Released: July 18, 2000
- Studio: Hawksleytown Studios
- Genre: Indie rock
- Length: 35:38
- Label: Vapor
- Producer: Hawksley Workman

Tegan and Sara chronology
Under Feet Like Ours (1999)	This Business of Art (2000)	If It Was You (2002)

Singles from This Business of Art
- 1. "The First" Released: 2000

Professional ratings
Review scores
Source	Rating
Allmusic	3/5 stars
Music Emissions	3.5/5 stars

This Business of Art is the second studio album by Canadian indie pop duo Tegan and Sara, released in 2000. It is their first official release through Vapor Records, though they independently released Under Feet Like Ours the previous year. Six of the songs originally appeared on its predecessor; "Proud", "Hype", "Freedom", "More for Me", "Come On" and "Superstar". "Frozen" was later included on the 2001 re-release of their debut album. This album was recorded at Hawksleytown Studios and mixed and mastered at Umbrella Sound in Toronto.

"My Number" was featured on the Sweet November soundtrack. In 2013, "Freedom" became the soundtrack to a Freederm advertising campaign in the UK.

== Track listing ==
No.	Title	Writer(s)	Length
1.	"The First"	Tegan Quin	3:13
2.	"Proud"	Sara Quin	2:50
3.	"Frozen"	T. Quin	2:44
4.	"Hype"	S. Quin	3:29
5.	"My Number"	T. Quin	4:11
6.	"All You Got"	S. Quin	3:00
7.	"Freedom"	T. Quin	2:42
8.	"Not with You"	S. Quin	3:33
9.	"More for Me"	T. Quin	3:00
10.	"Come On"	S. Quin	3:06
11.	"Superstar"	T. Quin	3:42

== Personnel ==
- Tegan and Sara Quin – vocals, lyrics, music, guitars
- Hawksley Workman – drums, bass guitar, piano, guitar, keyboards, harmonica, producer
- Karl Mohr – drum programming, keyboards
- Joao Carvalho – mixing, mastering, additional recording
- Greg O'Shea – additional recording
- Greg Hall – album layout and design, photography
- Ivan Otis – photography
