= Boyfriend (Tegan and Sara song) =

Single by Tegan and Sara

from the album Love You to Death
- Released: April 8, 2016
- Genre: Synth-pop; bubblegum pop
- Length: 2:47
- Label: Vapor; Warner Bros.
- Songwriters: Tegan Quin; Sara Quin; Greg Kurstin
- Producer: Greg Kurstin

Tegan and Sara singles chronology
"Everything is Awesome" (2014)	"Boyfriend" (2016)	"Stop Desire" (2016)

Music video
- "Boyfriend" on YouTube

"Boyfriend" is a song written and recorded by Canadian musical duo Tegan and Sara for their eighth studio album, Love You to Death (2016). The twins co-wrote the track with its producer, Greg Kurstin, who had previously worked with them on the majority of their breakthrough album, Heartthrob (2013). Released to digital retailers April 8, 2016 through Vapor Records and Warner Bros. Records, "Boyfriend" serves as the album's lead single and their first non-soundtrack single in nearly three years.

Upon its release, "Boyfriend" was met with generally positive reviews and moderate commercial reception. In the duo's native Canada, the song entered the Billboard Canadian Hot 100 at number 92 and has impacted multiple national airplay charts.

== Background and release ==
After a three-year gap since the release of their more commercial, pop-oriented album, Heartthrob (2013), Tegan and Sara announced their then-upcoming eighth studio album, Love You to Death, in March 2016. They reconnected with Greg Kurstin, who produced over half of the former (including all four of its official and promotional singles), for the entirety of the new album. "Boyfriend" was selected as the album's lead single and the duo released a teaser video to YouTube on March 30, 2016.

The song premiered in full through Beats 1 radio on April 7, 2016; it was then made available to download the following day, on April 8, 2016. Official remixes were commissioned by the duo's record label, Warner Bros. Records, in May and the resulting remix extended play was released on May 27, 2016. "Boyfriend" impacted American hot adult contemporary and AC radio formats on June 6, 2016.

== Lyrics and composition ==
"Boyfriend" is a synth-pop song with elements of new wave, written by Tegan Quin, Sara Quin, and Greg Kurstin and produced by Kurstin. The song is set in common time and lasts for a duration of two minutes and forty-seven seconds. Blaring synths accompany a "thundering" percussion beat, while the song also makes use of hand claps. The soundscape of "Boyfriend" has been compared to that of Heartthrob in addition to being described as "bombastic" and "stadium-shaking...full-on pop."

Lyrically, the song tackles the subject of defining a relationship, with the chorus listing contradictory behaviour that makes the narrator feel sometimes like a lover and other times like a friend. Inspired by a love triangle from Sara Quin's past in which she was dating a bisexual woman who had never dated another woman and was still also dating a man, "Boyfriend" also touches on LGBT themes including societal heteronormativity. On the relatability of the song, Sara Quin explained: "Obviously, being gay, there's sort of a bit of a gender twist in the song... that sometimes doesn't seem immediately relatable to everybody[...]. But...we've all been in that situation where we really like someone and we want to make it official and they're not ready, that's what the song is about."

== Critical reception ==
Music blog Idolator gave the song a 7.3/10 based on three contributors' reviews. "The duo aren't just simply sticking with what they do best this time around," writes Robbie Daw, who graded the song an 8/10, "they're fine-tuning it." Mike Wass also awarded the song an 8/10 and described the song as "joyous and anthemic—albeit with a bittersweet edge" while also praising the unique perspective. A more mixed review came from the blog's Carl Williott, who graded the song a 6/10, expressing that he was "disappointed" in the song's "glossy" pop sound but appreciated the twins' presence on the track.

Jenn Pelly of Pitchfork wrote that the chorus "plants itself firmly into your skull" and that it is "inspiring" the way Tegan and Sara "come into their own" on the song. In an advance review of the album, Christopher Bohlsen of Renowned for Sound cited "Boyfriend" as a "great example of the sheer quality of the sisters' writing" for their ability to "cut right to the emotional heart of the concept." Bohlsen also praised Kurstin's production and the "gendered" language.

Billboard ranked "Boyfriend" at number 87 on their "Billboard's 100 Best Pop Songs of 2016: Critics' Picks" list, writing "Today in pop singles that should have been massive hits: After working with Greg Kurstin for portions of 2013's Heartthrob, Tegan and Sara Quin team with the producer for 10 shimmering synth-pop gems, including this infectious tale of being in a relationship that's everything but public, topped off by a towering chorus. "

== Track listing ==
Digital download – single
No.	Title	Length
1.	"Boyfriend"	2:47

Digital download – Remixes EP
No.	Title	Length
1.	"Boyfriend" (Gilligan Moss remix)	6:28
2.	"Boyfriend" (Shura remix)	4:25
3.	"Boyfriend" (Robokid remix)	2:27
4.	"Boyfriend" (Alex Ghenea remix)	3:29

== Music video ==
The official music video for "Boyfriend" was directed by Clea DuVall and premiered April 27, 2016. In it, the twins take part in a fashion photo shoot organized by a fictionalized Rachel Antonoff which involved dogs, confetti, and a fan. Parenthood actresses Mae Whitman and Sarah Ramos also make cameo appearances.

== Live performances ==
Tegan and Sara performed "Boyfriend" live on The Tonight Show Starring Jimmy Fallon during the May 10, 2016 episode on which they served as a musical guest. They also performed the song on The Late Late Show with James Corden as a musical guest on June 8, 2016.

== Charts ==
=== Weekly charts ===
Chart (2016)	Peak position
Canada Hot 100 (Billboard)	64
Canada AC (Billboard)	16
Canada CHR/Top 40 (Billboard)	20
Canada Hot AC (Billboard)	9

== Release history ==
Country	Date	Format	Label	Ref.
Worldwide	April 8, 2016	Digital download	Warner Bros.	
Worldwide	May 27, 2016	Digital download – Remixes EP	Warner Bros.	
United States	June 6, 2016	Hot / Modern / AC radio	Warner Bros.	
