= Love You to Death (album) =

Studio album by Tegan and Sara
- Released: June 3, 2016
- Genre: Synth-pop
- Length: 31:27
- Labels: Vapor; Warner Bros.
- Producer: Greg Kurstin

Tegan and Sara chronology
Heartthrob (2013)	Love You to Death (2016)	Hey, I'm Just Like You (2019)

Singles from Love You to Death
- 1. "Boyfriend" Released: April 8, 2016; 2. "Stop Desire" Released: August 25, 2016

Love You to Death is the eighth studio album by Canadian indie pop duo Tegan and Sara, released on June 3, 2016, on Neil Young's label Vapor Records through Warner Bros. Records. Produced by Greg Kurstin, it is the follow-up to the duo's 2013 release Heartthrob, also produced in part by Kurstin. "Boyfriend" was released as the album's lead single on April 8, 2016. The same day, "U-Turn" was also released as a promotional single.

== Background ==
It was revealed in November 2015 by Stereogum that Tegan and Sara had completed recording of the then untitled album. The band announced the name of the album on their official Facebook on March 10, 2016, with the official album art released the next day on their official Instagram account.

== Recording and production ==
At the Beats 1 premiere interview, Sara explained the concept behind the album's lead single "Boyfriend":

As Quin explained to DJ Matt Wilkinson, the song details a love triangle she found herself in with a woman who not only hadn't dated another girl before, but was still seeing another man. "I think that's pretty relatable. Obviously, being gay, there's sort of a bit of a gender twist in the song, and I get that that sometimes doesn't seem immediately relatable to everybody, whether they're straight or whatever. But this idea, you know, that we've all been in that situation where we really like someone and we want to make it official, and they're not ready, that's what the song is about."

== Release ==
The album became available for pre-order on iTunes, Amazon Music, Google Play, and in retail stores and other music distribution platforms on April 8, 2016, and was released on June 3, 2016.

=== Singles ===
Since the album has become available for pre-order, one official single has been released from the album, titled "Boyfriend". The single first became available to listen to via Beats 1 on April 7, 2016, and was available to download the next day.

The twins announced via their Instagram account that "Stop Desire" would be released as the second single from the album. The track is also featured on the soundtrack and in the trailer of The Sims 4: City Living expansion pack.

=== Promotional singles ===
"U-turn" was released as a promotional single along with "Boyfriend" on April 8, 2016, for listeners who pre-ordered the album. "100x" was released as the second promotional single on May 6, 2016, and "Stop Desire" was released as the third and final promotional single on May 20, 2016.

== Critical reception ==
Professional ratings
Aggregate scores
Source	Rating
AnyDecentMusic?	7.6/10
Metacritic	78/100
Review scores
Source	Rating
AllMusic	4/5 stars
The A.V. Club	B+
The Guardian	4/5 stars
NME	5/5 stars
The Observer	4/5 stars
Pitchfork	7.1/10
Rolling Stone	3/5 stars
Spin	8/10
Uncut	9/10
Vice (Expert Witness)	A−

Love You to Death received generally positive reviews from music critics. At Metacritic, which assigns a normalized rating out of 100 to reviews from mainstream critics, the album has an average score of 78 out of 100 based on 24 reviews, which indicates "generally favorable reviews". Tim Sendra of AllMusic writes: "This is pop music that is all heart all the time, and for that, the sisters deserve every accolade that comes their way." Spin's Rachel Brodsky claims: "All over their eighth album, the Quins continue to demonstrate what makes them such fine songwriters." Jordan Bassett of NME calls it a "perfectly formed record full of buoyant pop songs." Exclaim!'s Ryan McNutt gave the album a positive review, calling it "another solid soundtrack for summer romances and road-trips alike". "Every track is a three-minute formalist construct that captures a mood... every one is catchy," said Robert Christgau in his review for Vice.

=== Accolades ===
Publication	Accolade	Rank	Ref.
AllMusic	Best of 2016	*	
AllMusic	Favorite Pop Albums	*	
Consequence of Sound	Top 50 Albums of 2016	27	
Cosmopolitan	The 15 Best Albums of 2016	15	
Diffuser	Top 40 Albums of 2016	19	
Digital Spy	20 Best Albums of 2016	20	
Entertainment Weekly	Best Albums of 2016	13	
FasterLouder	The 50 Best Albums of 2016	38	
The Guardian	The Best Albums of 2016	35	
NME	NME's Albums of the Year 2016	18	
Paste	The 50 Best Albums of 2016	28	
Under the Radar	Top 100 Albums of 2016	98	

== Commercial performance ==
Love You to Death entered the Billboard 200 at number 16. In its second week, the album fell to number 181. In the United Kingdom, Love You to Death reached number 30. In Canada, Love You to Death reached number three and spent three weeks on the chart.

== Track listing ==
Credits adapted from the iTunes pre-order listing.

No.	Title	Writer(s)	Length
1.	"That Girl"	Tegan Quin; Sara Quin	2:44
2.	"Faint of Heart"	T. Quin; S. Quin	2:54
3.	"Boyfriend"	T. Quin; S. Quin; Greg Kurstin	2:47
4.	"Dying to Know"	T. Quin; S. Quin; Kurstin; Jesse Shatkin	3:37
5.	"Stop Desire"	T. Quin; S. Quin	3:17
6.	"White Knuckles"	T. Quin; S. Quin	3:18
7.	"100x"	T. Quin; S. Quin; Shatkin	3:02
8.	"BWU"	T. Quin; S. Quin; Kurstin	3:21
9.	"U-Turn"	T. Quin; S. Quin; Kurstin	2:58
10.	"Hang On to the Night"	T. Quin; S. Quin	3:29
Total length:			31:27

== Personnel ==
Credits adapted from AllMusic.

Musicians

- Sara Quin – vocals
- Tegan Quin – vocals
- Greg Kurstin – keyboards (all tracks), bass (tracks 1–6, 9 and 10), drums (tracks 1–6, 8–10), guitar (tracks 1, 3, 5, 6 and 8), acoustic guitar (track 9), piano (tracks 4, 6 and 9)

Technical personnel

- Chris Allgood – mastering assistance
- Julian Burg – engineering
- Chris Galland – assistance
- Greg Kurstin – engineering, production
- Emily Lazar – mastering
- Pamela Littky – photography
- Manny Marroquin – mixing
- Alex Pasco – engineering
- Ike Schultz – assistance
- Jeff Sosnow – A&R
- E.E. Storey – art direction, design

== Charts ==
Chart (2016)	Peak position
Australian Albums (ARIA)	13
Belgian Albums (Ultratop Flanders)	61
Belgian Albums (Ultratop Wallonia)	156
Canadian Albums (Billboard)	3
Hungarian Albums (MAHASZ)	18
Irish Albums (IRMA)	29
UK Albums (Official Charts)	30
US Billboard 200	16
