= Things Couldn't Be Better =

Studio album by The Reason
- Released: March 6, 2007
- Genre: Rock; Alternative rock Indie Rock
- Label: Smallman Records
- Producer: Gavin Brown

The Reason chronology
Ravenna (2005)	Things Couldn't Be Better (2007)	Fools (2010)

Things Couldn't Be Better is a studio album by Canadian rock band The Reason. Their second release, the album's song "We're So Beyond This" features guest vocals by Sara Quin of Tegan and Sara and the artwork was designed by artist Emy 'EE' Storey.

== Track listing ==
1. "My Broken Legs"
2. "This Is Just The Beginning"
3. "All I Ever Wanted"
4. "Unquestionable"
5. "Is It Just Me?"
6. "This Is Where We Go It Alone"
7. "If My Tongue Could Talk"
8. "We're So Beyond This" feat. Sara Quin
9. "This Is Taking Forever"
10. "I Felt A Song Inside Me"
11. "Sleepyhead"
12. "Reset The Breaker"

- Produced by Gavin Brown - Engineered and mixed by Eric Ratz
