= So Jealous =

Studio album by Tegan and Sara
- Released: September 14, 2004
- Studios: Mushroom Studios (Vancouver); Divine Industries (Vancouver)
- Genres: Indie pop; indie rock; power pop; emo
- Length: 45:41
- Labels: Vapor; Sanctuary
- Producers: Sara Quin; Tegan Quin; John Collins; David Carswell; Howard Redekopp

Tegan and Sara chronology
If It Was You (2002)	So Jealous (2004)	The Con (2007)

So Jealous is the fourth studio album by Canadian indie pop duo Tegan and Sara, released on September 14, 2004. It is their third album on Vapor Records. The album went gold in Canada and was nominated for a Juno Award for Alternative Album of the Year. Two singles were released, "Walking with a Ghost" and "Speak Slow", with videos for each. "Walking with a Ghost" became the title song of their EP Walking with a Ghost, and was later covered by The White Stripes. The album art was created by designer EE Storey.

On February 11, 2022, the duo released Still Jealous, a completely acoustic reimagining of So Jealous.

== Critical reception ==
Professional ratings
Aggregate scores
Source	Rating
Metacritic	70/100
Review scores
Source	Rating
AllMusic	4/5 stars
Entertainment Weekly	B+
The Guardian	4/5 stars
Pitchfork	(3.4/10)
Robert Christgau	(1-star Honorable Mention)

At Metacritic, which assigns a weighted mean rating out of 100 to reviews from mainstream critics, the album received an average score of 70, which indicates "generally favorable reviews", based on 20 reviews.

Writing for Rolling Stone, Meredith Ochs praised the album for its "flashes of brilliance" and said that it probably marks the beginning of a successful career. She noted the progression from Tegan and Sara's previous "indie-folk" albums to a more "buoyant punk-pop" sound, inspired by 1980s pop. She cited "Where Does the Good Go" and "Speak Slow" as highlights.

In a review for AllMusic, Stephen Thomas Erlewine gave the album a star rating of four out of five. He described it as ambitious and lively, and called it Tegan and Sara's "most satisfying album" yet. He noted a shift in sound from their previous recordings, with what he described as "a heavy dose of new wave sensibility". He commented that although So Jealous may be more accessible to a wider audience, Tegan and Sara may still be an "acquired taste". Michael Endelman of Entertainment Weekly gave the album a B+ rating and noted its new wave and rock influences. In his 2005 book Music Lust, Nic Harcourt called the album "a collection of hooky power pop songs that make good use of their vocal harmonies and show them maturing as songwriters and performers".

Marc Hogan of Pitchfork gave the album a negative review, rating it 3.4 out of 10.

In December 2004, Rolling Stone named So Jealous one of the Top 50 records of 2004.

"Walking with a Ghost" earned an iTunes "Discovery Download" spotlight.

In 2024, the album won the public vote for the Slaight Family Polaris Heritage Prize at the 2024 Polaris Music Prize.

== Track listing ==
No.	Title	Writer(s)	Length
1.	"You Wouldn't Like Me"	Tegan Quin	2:56
2.	"Take Me Anywhere"	T. Quin	2:31
3.	"I Bet It Stung"	Sara Quin	3:35
4.	"I Know I Know I Know"	T. Quin	3:44
5.	"Where Does the Good Go"	T. Quin	3:37
6.	"Downtown"	S. Quin	4:25
7.	"I Won't Be Left"	T. Quin	2:38
8.	"Walking with a Ghost"	S. Quin	2:30
9.	"So Jealous"	S. Quin	2:58
10.	"Speak Slow"	T. Quin	2:21
11.	"Wake Up Exhausted"	T. Quin	3:16
12.	"We Didn't Do It"	S. Quin	3:48
13.	"Fix You Up"	T. Quin	2:53
14.	"I Can't Take It"	S. Quin	4:30

Japanese release bonus track
No.	Title	Writer(s)	Length
15.	"Love Type Thing"	S. Quin	1:48

== Personnel ==
Adapted from the So Jealous credits.

Musicians

- Nick Blasko – violin
- Chris Carlson – bass
- David Carswell – guitar, piano
- Rob Chursinoff — percussion, drums
- John Collins – guitar, percussion
- Howard Redekopp – guitar, keyboards
- Matt Sharp – keyboards, Moog synthesizer
- Tegan and Sara – organ, guitar, percussion, piano, keyboards

Design

- Dustin Rabin – photography
- Emily Storey – album cover

Production

- David Carswell – producer
- John Collins – producer
- Steve Hall – mastering
- Joel Livesey – assistant engineer
- Misha Rajaratnam – assistant engineer
- Howard Redekopp – producer, engineer, mixing
- Rob Stesanson – assistant engineer
- Tegan and Sara – producer

== In popular culture ==
On April 10, 2005, "Where Does the Good Go" was played in the fourth episode of season 1 of the ABC drama Grey's Anatomy titled "No Man's Land". It was played again in the season 10 finale "Fear (of the Unknown)" as the final scene between protagonist Meredith Grey and Cristina Yang.

"Walking with a Ghost" appears on the soundtrack for the 2005 movie Monster-in-Law and was used in the season 3 promo for Medium. The song was covered by The White Stripes on an EP released six months after their album Get Behind Me Satan.

In 2016, Tegan and Sara appeared on the parody talk show "Comedy Bang Bang" and explained jokingly that the ghost in question was Slimer from the Ghostbusters franchise.

In 2017, American rapper Lil Yachty released a song which sampled "Walking with a Ghost" called "Running with a Ghost" (featuring Grace). The song was released on his debut studio album Teenage Emotions without crediting Tegan and Sara for the sample.
