= Tegan and Sara =

Canadian indie rock/indie pop duo

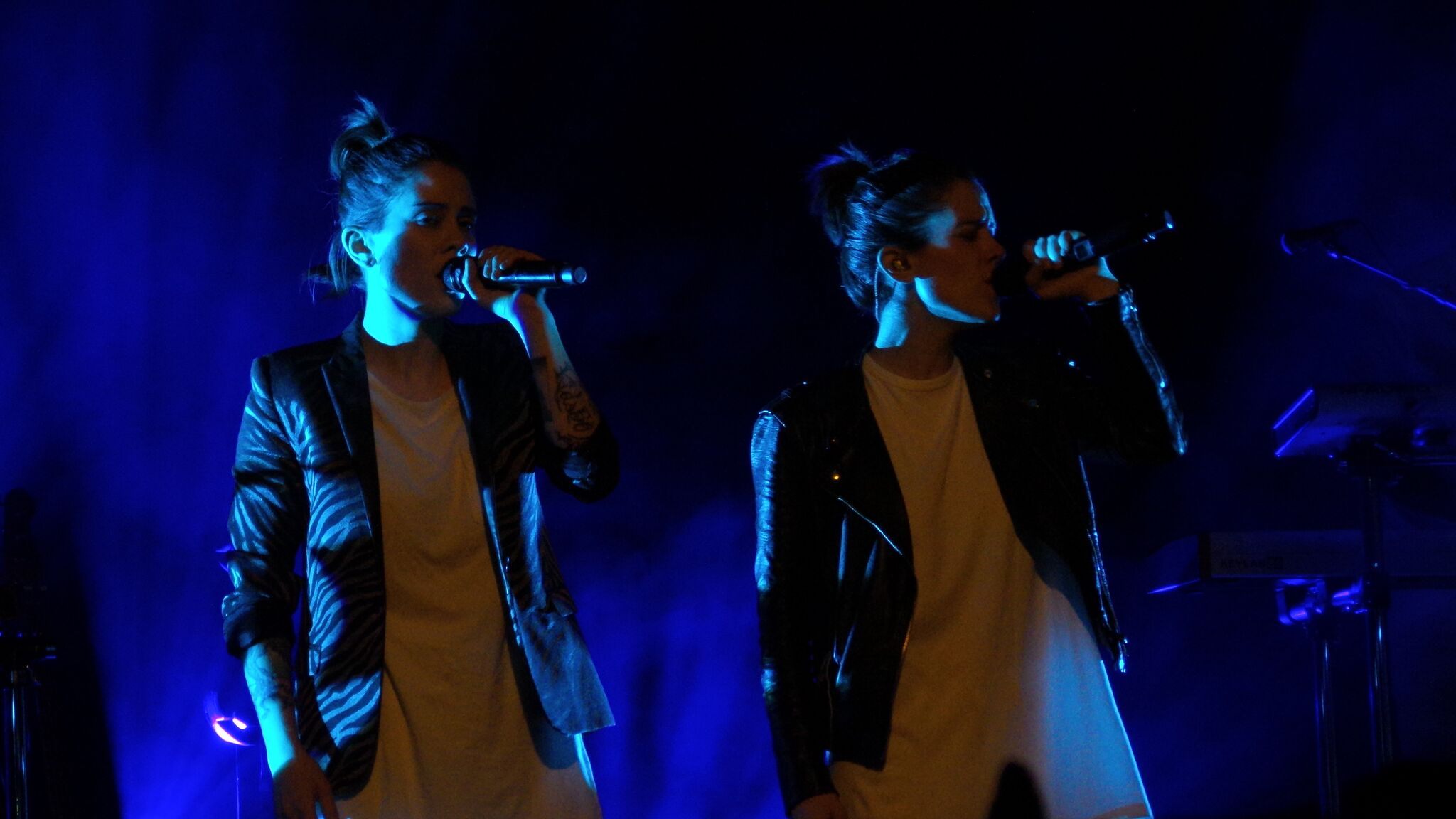
- Tegan and Sara performing live in 2017

Background information
- Born: Tegan Rain Quin; Sara Keirsten Quin; September 19, 1980 (age 46)
- Origin: Calgary, Alberta, Canada
- Genres: Indie pop; indie folk; synth-pop; indie rock; pop
- Works: Tegan and Sara discography
- Years active: 1995–present
- Labels: Vapor; Sire; Warner; Mom + Pop
- Members: Tegan Quin; Sara Quin
- Website: teganandsara.com

Tegan and Sara (/ˈtiːɡən, ˈsɛərə/) are a Canadian indie pop duo formed in 1998 in Calgary, Alberta. The band is led by identical twin sisters, Tegan Rain Quin and Sara Keirsten Quin (born September 19, 1980), both songwriters and multi-instrumentalists. After releasing a number of demos on cassette tape, the duo released their debut album in 1999, after which they were signed by Neil Young's Vapor Records. They have released ten studio albums, most recently Crybaby in 2022.

Tegan and Sara's 2011 video album Get Along received a Grammy nomination. Amongst other collaborations, in 2014 the duo performed "Everything Is Awesome" featuring The Lonely Island for The Lego Movie soundtrack. In 2019, they released a memoir titled High School, which in 2022 was adapted as a television series for Amazon Freevee. Both individuals are involved in the LGBTQ community.

== History ==
=== 1995–2002: Background and early work ===
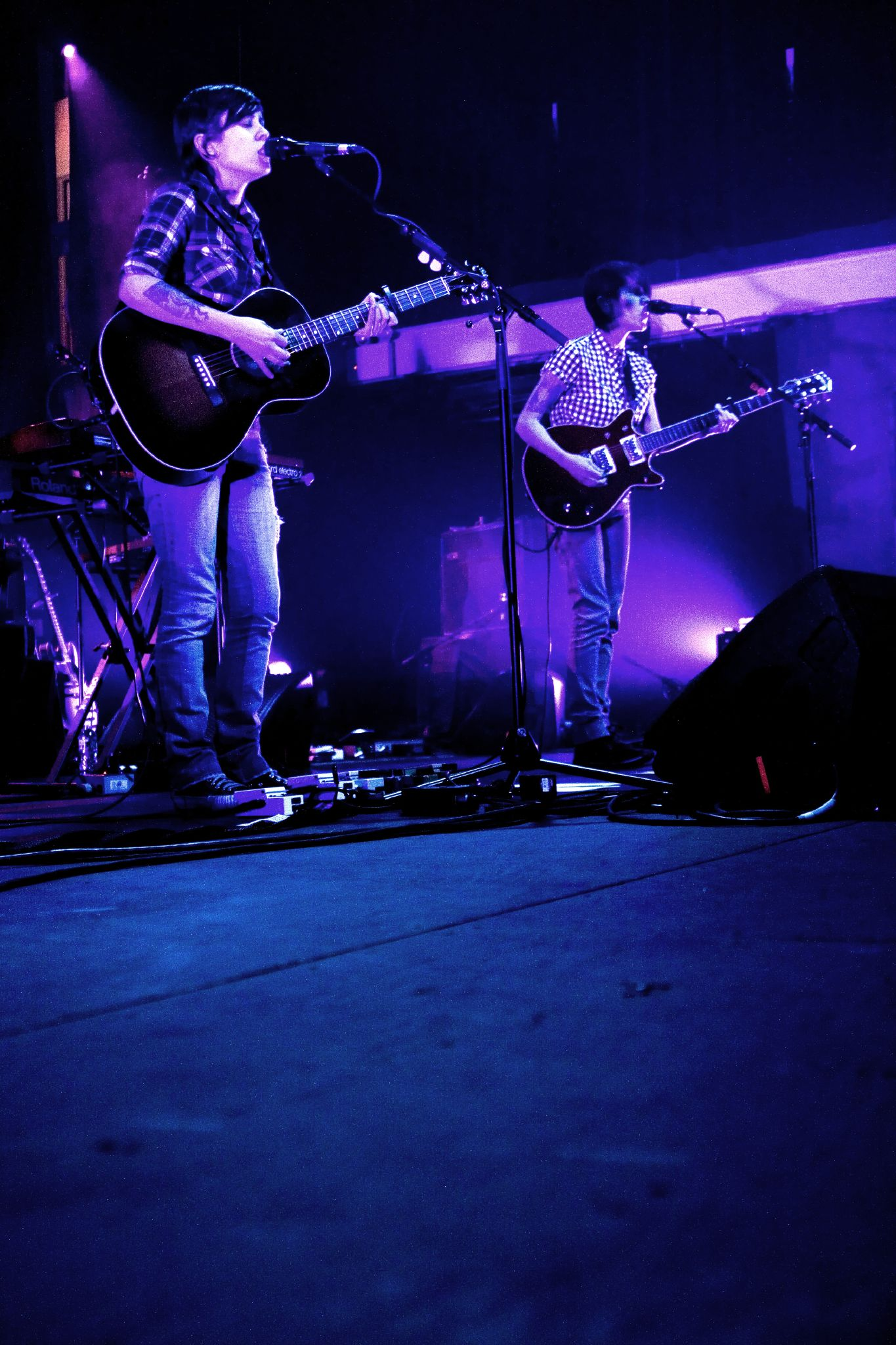
Tegan and Sara at Terminal 5, New York City, October 6, 2008

Tegan and Sara began writing songs at 14. One of the first songs they wrote was "Tegan Didn't Go To School Today", written by Sara and recorded by the pair on cassette tape. The band was first called "Plunk", short for "light punk", due to their lack of a drummer and bassist. In 1997, they used their school's recording studio to record two demo albums: So Who's in Your Band? and Play Day. In 1998 they won Calgary's "Garage Warz" competition, which awarded them studio time. They recorded their first professional demo called Yellow Tape under "Sara and Tegan" using this studio time. This was followed by Orange Tape and Red Tape. In May 1998, they opened for Hayden in Calgary, marking their first major show.

In 1999, they released their debut album, Under Feet Like Ours, as "Sara and Tegan", with producer Jared Kuemper., After listening to it, Elliot Roberts flew up from Los Angeles to meet them at the Starfish Room in Vancouver, British Columbia, and he offered them a record deal that same night. Two songs from Red Tape and two from Orange Tape appeared on the album. They later changed their name to "Tegan and Sara" because people regularly misheard "Sara and Tegan" as "Sara Antegan". They signed with Neil Young's Vapor Records and released This Business of Art through the label in 2000. According to Tegan, having no manager for the first three years of their career taught them to be “very cognizant and present” in every decision.

=== 2002–2011: Mainstream success ===
In 2002, Tegan and Sara released their third album, If It Was You. Their fourth album, So Jealous, was released in 2004 and led to wider success and attention, both locally and internationally. This album was released through both Vapor and Sanctuary. The band's 2007 album, The Con, was released by Vapor and Sire because Sanctuary no longer released new music in the United States. The album was co-produced by Chris Walla. Guests and collaborators on the album included Jason McGerr of Death Cab for Cutie, Matt Sharp of The Rentals (and previously Weezer), Hunter Burgan of AFI, and Kaki King.

On October 26, 2009, Tegan and Sara released their sixth album, Sainthood, produced by Chris Walla and Howard Redekopp. Sainthood debuted on the Billboard 200 chart at number 21, selling 24,000 copies in its first week. While recording the album, Tegan and Sara wrote songs together in New Orleans for a week. The song "Paperback Head" was the only song the pair wrote to appear on the album, making it the first song on any Tegan and Sara album they wrote together. Spin gave Sainthood four out of five stars and wrote, "Tegan and Sara's music may no longer be the stuff of teens, but its strength remains in how much it feels like two people talking." The duo also put out a three-volume book set titled ON, IN, AT that included stories, essays, journals, and photos of the band touring America in late 2008, writing together in New Orleans and touring Australia. Lindsey Byrnes and Ryan Russell took the photographs in the book.

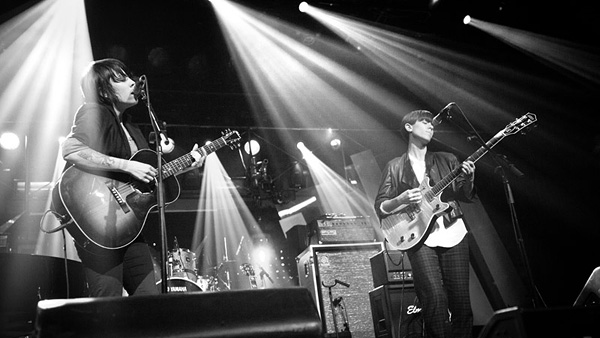
Tegan and Sara performing at the Polaris Music Prize Gala 2010

In 2011, they launched "2011: A Merch Odyssey", which saw at least one new item in the official online stores every month for the entire year. A live CD/DVD combination package titled Get Along was released on November 15 and contained three films titled "States", "India", and "For the Most Part". It was nominated for Best Long-Form Music Video at the 2013 Grammy Awards.

=== 2012–2018: Heartthrob, Love You to Death, and The Con X: Covers ===
Tegan and Sara began recording their seventh studio album, Heartthrob, on February 20, 2012. Greg Kurstin produced eight songs. Joey Waronker contributed drums to these songs. Two songs were produced by Mike Elizondo, with Victor Indrizzo contributing drums, Josh Lopez contributing guitar, and Dave Palmer contributing piano. Justin Meldal-Johnsen had the last two songs. The first single, "Closer", was released on September 25, 2012. The album was released on January 29, 2013, and debuted on the Billboard Top 200 at number 3, the band's highest-charting record, selling 49,000 copies in its first week. Heartthrob debuted at number 2 on the Canadian chart and digital downloads chart and hit number 1 on the rock and alternative album charts. In July 2013, the album was shortlisted for the 2013 Polaris Music Prize. In March 2014, Tegan and Sara won three Juno Awards for Single of the Year, Pop Album of the Year and Group of the Year making them the first female band and the first duo to win this award.

Tegan and Sara finished their eighth studio album on November 30, 2015. On March 10, 2016, they announced that the album's title would be Love You to Death, with the release date set for June 3 of that year. They released the album's lead single, "Boyfriend", on April 8. On April 25, tour dates were announced for their 2016 global tour to support the album. The duo released a music video for each track on the album.

Tegan and Sara collaborated with 17 artists, including Cyndi Lauper, to create The Con X: Covers in 2017 to commemorate the tenth anniversary of the release of The Con. The participating artists recorded covers of The Con's original songs to benefit the Tegan and Sara Foundation. Tegan and Sara also toured an acoustic version of The Con in 2017, with some of the proceeds supporting the Tegan and Sara Foundation.

=== 2019–2020: Hey, I'm Just Like You and memoir ===
In May 2018, at Out Web Fest, Tegan stated they were working on a book, podcast and new record. On September 24, 2019, their memoir High School was released by MCD Books, a division of Farrar, Straus, and Giroux, alongside Simon & Schuster Canada and Virago Press in the United Kingdom. The memoir details their teenage years, growing up in Canada and "worshipping" Nirvana, Green Day and the Smashing Pumpkins. The book also details the twins' exploration of their sexuality. While researching the book, Tegan and Sara found cassettes of some of their earliest songs.

In early 2019, Tegan and Sara announced they were working on their next record for release later that year. On July 9, 2019, they announced via Instagram that their ninth album would be called Hey, I'm Just Like You and would consist of 12 re-recorded songs they initially wrote as teenagers. It was released on September 27, 2019, three days after the release of their memoir.

In April 2020, the duo created a live "show" called Where Does the Good Grow to entertain their fans during the COVID-19 pandemic, with merchandise designed by EE Storey. The show was held every Thursday at 3 p.m. PST on their Instagram account until the series finale on July 23, 2020.

In 2021, it was announced that a TV show named High School, based on their memoir of the same name, would be filmed in Calgary and directed by Clea DuVall. Twins Railey and Seazynn Gilliland were cast as the main characters. The show was filmed from April to June 2022 and was released on Amazon Freevee in the fall of 2022.

=== 2021–2022: Still Jealous, new record label, and Crybaby ===
In July 2021, Tegan and Sara announced a return to the studio to work on their 10th album. On February 1, 2022, they announced Still Jealous, an utterly acoustic re-imagining of So Jealous. Still Jealous was released on February 11, 2022.

In April 2022, the duo announced they had left Warner Records and signed a new record deal with Mom + Pop. They also released the first single, "Fucking Up What Matters", from their 10th studio album on April 28, 2022. On July 12, 2022, they unveiled the album title, Crybaby, and that it would be released on October 21, 2022. The second single, "Yellow", was released on the same day, with the music video released on YouTube. The twins also announced their first tour in three years, which started in Philadelphia, PA, on October 26, 2022, and ended in Vancouver on November 20, 2022.

=== 2023–present: Junior High, Substack and Not Tonight Tour ===
In 2023, the duo released their first graphic novel, titled Junior High, based on their youth, with artwork by Tillie Walden. It explores the themes of growing up, coming out, and self-discovery through music and sisterhood, loosely serving as a prequel to their adolescence memoir, High School. In February 2024, the duo announced they would be introducing a new subscription to their already popular "Substack" called The Loners Club. This included the reintroduction of the pandemic-era Instagram show "Where does the good grow". In early 2024, the twins set out on tour to celebrate their album If It Was You (2002). The tour is centered around Ontario, Canada, starting in Richmond Hill in March 2024 and ending in Guelph in April 2024. In April 2024, the twins won the Juno Humanitarian award for their work with the Tegan and Sara Foundation.

In September 2026, Tegan and Sara released a single and music video for "Our Year" featuring fellow Canadian musicians Lights and Felix Cartal. The music video was filmed at multiple well-known Vancouver locations including the Museum of Vancouver, Kitsilano Pool,Burrard Bridge and the City Centre Artist Lodge. That same month, Tegan released her first solo novel called Merry Christmess.

== Influences ==
Tegan and Sara have credited Green Day, Nirvana, and Hole for "truly start[ing] to cement our desire to write and make our music". During their teenage years, the duo was influenced by Hayden, The Smashing Pumpkins, Violent Femmes, Dinosaur Jr., and Teenage Fanclub. Other artists who have influenced Tegan and Sara include Depeche Mode, Rihanna, Taylor Swift, Madonna, Kate Bush, David Bowie, Mike Elizondo, Pink, Lily Allen, Erasure, Ace of Base, Tom Petty, Britney Spears, Katy Perry, Ani DiFranco, the New Pornographers, Cyndi Lauper, Sinéad O'Connor, Against Me!, and Bruce Springsteen.

== Personal lives ==
Both twins identify as lesbian, and both are married. In 2018, Tegan married Sofia Snow, after dating for two years. In 2011, Sara married her longtime girlfriend Stacy Reader, and in August 2022, they welcomed their first child, a son. As of 2026, they have two children.

At 19, both Quins moved from their hometown of Calgary, Alberta, to Vancouver, British Columbia. In 2003, Sara moved to Montreal. Tegan lived in Vancouver and Los Angeles for many years, while Sara lived in Montreal and New York City. As of 2019, Tegan and Sara had both moved back to Vancouver.

Tegan and Sara are active politically and socially engaged. They advocate for LGBTQ equality, music education, literacy, and cancer research.

The sisters are cousins to musician Jen Twynn Payne, drummer and lead vocalist for the Vancouver-based band The Courtneys.

== Activism and involvement in the LGBTQ+ community ==
In 2012, they appeared on the cover of Under the Radar magazine's "Protest" issue. Both were photographed holding a sign: "The rights of the minority should never be subject to the whim of the majority." Also, they actively supported Quebec students protesting against the provincial government in Canada. In the U.S., both were vocal during California's Prop 8 debates.

In 2013, the band partnered with Coolhaus, their "favourite ice cream sandwich truck", to create an ice cream sandwich in favour of same-sex marriage. The sandwich featured "double chocolate" cookies and salted caramel ice cream and was named "Til Death Do Us Part". The duo partnered with Revel & Riot to create a T-shirt that would fund Revel & Riot's mission for LGBTQ rights. The "Animals" T-shirt features Tegan and Sara, a turtle, fox, koala, penguin and a dragonfly, all labelled with their Latin names. The text at the bottom reads, "Gay behaviour is found in over 1500 species. LGBTQ equality now." All sale proceeds go to benefit the work of Revel & Riot.

Due to the expansion of their audience, Tegan and Sara have gained a higher profile in the LGBTQ community. They were awarded Outstanding Music Artist at the GLAAD Media Awards, beating out high-profile musicians, including Lady Gaga and Elton John. In June 2014, Tegan and Sara joined WorldPride to perform in the closing ceremonies at Yonge–Dundas Square (now Sankofa Square) in downtown Toronto.

On November 10, 2016, rather than boycotting North Carolina for HB2, Tegan and Sara performed at The Orange Peel and donated their proceeds to Equality North Carolina to fight the legislation. This inspired the band Matt and Kim to match their donation with merchandise proceeds.

In December 2016, in the wake of the U.S. presidential election, the sisters founded the Tegan and Sara Foundation to advocate for "economic justice, health and representation for LGBTQ girls and women". They have since partnered with Kiehl's to release Ultra Facial cleansers with limited-edition packaging to raise funds for the foundation. Profits from The Con X: Covers and a portion of ticket prices from The Con's 10th-anniversary tour went to the Tegan and Sara Foundation. At the end of The Con's 10th-anniversary tour in 2017, they stated their plan to take two years off from touring to focus on the foundation and to make a new record.

In 2024, Tegan and Sara began activism in response to new policy pitched by the United Conservative Party in Alberta. The proposed bill was posed to impact LGBTQ youth by outing them to parents if they used new pronouns or names in school, and limited medical care for trans youth. The Tegan and Sara Foundation published an open letter signed by more than 400 Canadian musicians denouncing the UCP policy. The two also used their Juno Awards speech time to speak against this policy.

== Touring ==
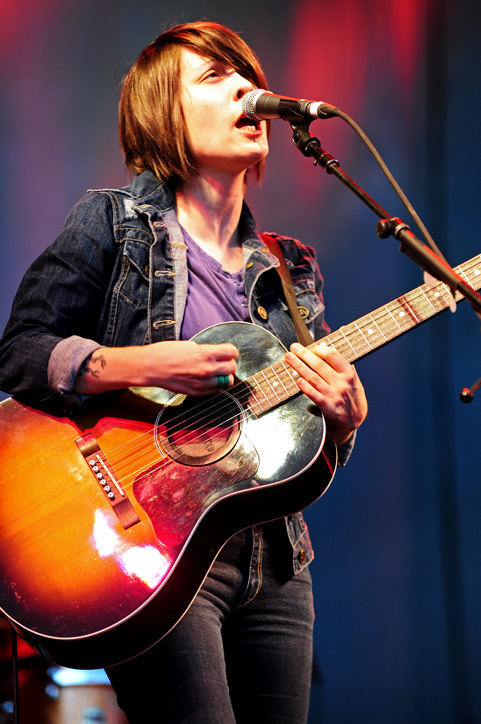
Tegan at NIB Stadium in December 2010

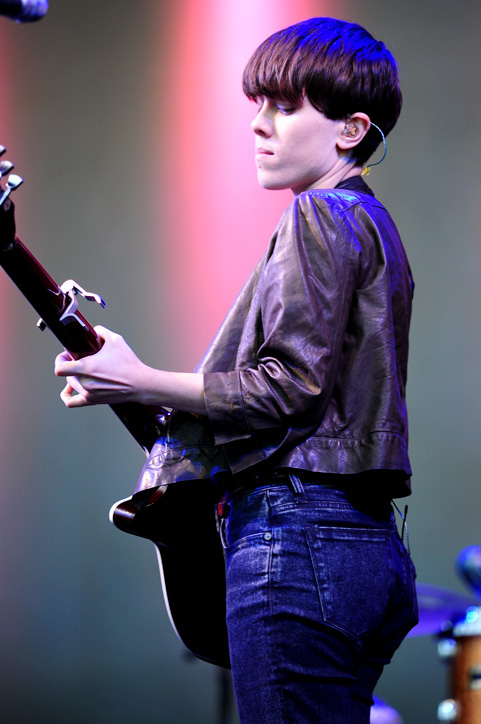
Sara at NIB Stadium in December 2010

Tegan and Sara began touring after graduating high school in 1998, travelling by car and Greyhound bus. In 2000, they toured with Neil Young and the Pretenders. Other notable touring mates include Ryan Adams, Weezer, Bryan Adams, Jack Johnson, the Black Keys, Ben Folds, Gogol Bordello, Cake, City and Colour, Death Cab for Cutie, Hot Hot Heat, the Killers, New Found Glory, Paramore, Rufus Wainwright, Eugene Francis Jnr, the Jezabels, An Horse, Steel Train, Holly Miranda and Speak.

The sisters engage in onstage banter, often including stories and commentary about their childhood, politics and life on the road. This has become a characteristic trait of their live shows.

They have performed at festivals including the Mariposa Folk Festival 2001; Sarah McLachlan's Lilith Fair 1999, 2010; Coachella 2005, 2008, 2013; Lollapalooza; SXSW 2005, 2013; Austin City Limits; Bonnaroo; Falls Festival: Sasquatch! 2010; Osheaga; Cyndi Lauper's True Colors Tour 2008; Southbound 2009; Glastonbury 2010; Australia's Groovin' the Moo 2010, 2013; Splendour in the Grass 2016; Winnipeg Folk Festival 2011; Newport Folk Festival 2011; saskTel Saskatchewan Jazz Festival 2011; Cisco Ottawa Bluesfest 2011, 2015; Outside Lands 2014; Firefly 2014 and Area506 in 2017 in Saint John, New Brunswick. They performed at the ending ceremony at Toronto World Pride 2014 and at Boston Calling in May 2014.

In 2013, Tegan and Sara opened for the band Fun. on their Most Nights Summer Tour, which started in Toronto, Ontario, on July 6 and ended in Bridgeport, Connecticut, on September 28. In January 2014, Katy Perry announced that Tegan and Sara, Capital Cities, and Kacey Musgraves would be the opening acts for the North American leg of her Prismatic World Tour. Tegan and Sara toured with Perry from September to October 2014.

On February 25, 2014, Tegan and Sara announced their Let's Make Things Physical Tour. The tour included various supporting acts for cities, including Lucius, the Courtneys, Waters, and My Midnight Heart. The tour kicked off on May 6 in Columbia, Missouri, and ended in November 2014. In July 2014, the pair opened for Lady Gaga's 2014 concert tour, ArtRave: The Artpop Ball Tour, in Quebec City in front of a crowd of 80,000 people.

Their 2016 tour for Love You to Death started in London and passed through Australia, Hong Kong, Singapore, and Taiwan in July before looping back to Canada and the U.S.

Tegan and Sara were a part of the WayHome summer 2017 line-up in Oro-Medonte, Ontario.

Tegan and Sara will be joining Hilary Duff as a supporting act on tour during part of her 2027 American leg of The Lucky Me Tour.

== Collaborations and other work ==
In 2009, Tegan and Sara worked as producers for the first time. Tegan worked with char2d2 on the 2009 Small Vampires EP, while Sara worked on the 2010 debut albums for Fences and Hesta Prynn.

=== Tegan ===
Tegan appeared on Against Me!'s song "Borne of the FM Waves of the Heart" and in the music video. She also sang backing vocals on Rachael Cantu's "Saturday" from her Run All Night.

In April 2008, Tegan wrote and recorded a song titled "His Love" at the request of Augusten Burroughs as a contribution to the audio version of his book A Wolf at the Table. The two headlined Spin's September 2008 Liner Notes benefit for Housing Works, a New York non-profit. Tegan sang with Jim Ward on his track "Broken Songs" and on the song "Contrails" by rapper Astronautalis, which appeared on his 2011 album This Is Our Science. She also appeared in the music video. Tegan was also featured in one of the songs from Dan Mangan's new LP Unmake, titled "Forgetery Redux". In 2017, Tegan was featured on Ria Mae's song "Broken".

=== Sara ===
Sara sings in Reason's song "We're So Beyond This" and appears in the music video. She was featured on rapper/songwriter/producer Theophilus London's track "Why Even Try" from his 2011 Lovers Holiday EP. Sara appears on Jonathan Coulton's 2011 album Artificial Heart, providing vocals for the album's remake of the song "Still Alive", which Coulton wrote for Valve's game Portal. Sara covered Alicia Keys' "Try Sleeping with a Broken Heart" from Doveman's Burgundy Stain Sessions in 2011. In Kaki King's music video for "Pull Me Out Alive", Sara can also be seen. Sara sang backup vocals on two songs from former Smashing Pumpkins member James Iha's 2012 album Look to the Sky: "To Who Knows Where" and "Dream Tonight".

=== Together ===
In December 2010, Tegan and Sara collaborated with the Yellow Bird Project to produce a charity T-shirt. The shirt was designed by EE Storey, with all profits benefiting FIERCE NYC, an organization that builds the leadership and power of LGBTQ communities in New York City.

Tegan and Sara have both ventured into songwriting for other artists. This includes two songs, "A Hot Minute" and "The Worst", featured in Lisa Loeb's 2013 release No Fairy Tale. Sara also co-wrote "Sweetie", which was included in the deluxe edition of Carly Rae Jepsen's album Kiss.

They both feature on the single "Getaway" for VINCINT's debut album There Will Be Tears.

They both feature on the single "Teenage Tears" with Arkells on the album Blink Twice

List of solo collaborations
Member(s)	Year	Collaborator(s)	Song	Album
Tegan	2005	Vivek Shraya	"The Alphabet"	A Composite of Straight Lines
Tegan	2005	David Usher	"Hey Kids"	If God Had Curves
Tegan	2006	Melissa Ferrick	"Never Give Up"	In the Eyes of Strangers
Tegan	2006	Kinnie Starr	"La Le La La"	In the Eyes of Strangers
Tegan	2006	Rachael Cantu	"Saturday"	Run All Night
Tegan	2007	Against Me!	"Borne on the FM Waves of the Heart"	New Wave
Tegan	2008	Alkaline Trio	"Wake Up Exhausted"	Agony & Irony
Tegan	2009	Jim Ward	"Broken Songs"	In the Valley, On the Shores EP
Tegan	2009	Rachael Cantu	"Saturday"	Far and Wide
Tegan	2009	Rachael Cantu	"Thieves and Their Hands"	Far and Wide
Tegan	2009	Rachael Cantu	"Blue House Baby"	Far and Wide
Tegan	2011	Astronautalis	"Contrails"	This Is Our Science
Sara	2007	The Reason	"We're So Beyond This"	Things Couldn't Be Better
Sara	2007	Ted Gowans and Kaki King	"Sweetness Follows" (R.E.M. cover)	Drive XV: A Tribute to Automatic for the People
Sara	2007	Vivek Shraya	"Your Name"	If We're Not Talking
Sara	2009	Dragonette	"Okay Dolore"	Fixin to Thrill
Sara	2010	Emm Gryner	"Top Speed"	Gem and I
Sara	2011	Theophilus London	"Why Even Try"	Lovers Holiday
Sara	2011	Jonathan Coulton	"Still Alive"	Artificial Heart
Sara	2014	Bleachers	"Shadow"	Strange Desire

=== Other appearances ===
Their songs have been featured in the films Dallas Buyers Club, The Lego Movie, G.B.F., Monster-in-Law, Sweet November, These Girls and The Carmilla Movie and in the television shows Degrassi: The Next Generation, 90210, Being Erica, Ghost Whisperer, Grey's Anatomy, The Hills, Hollyoaks, jPod, The L Word, Life Unexpected, Melrose Place, One Tree Hill, Parenthood, Rookie Blue, The Vampire Diaries, Veronica Mars, Waterloo Road, What's New, Scooby-Doo?, Awkward, Riverdale, Girls, BoJack Horseman, and Scott Pilgrim Takes Off.

Their song "Closer" was covered by Glee on the episode "Feud", which aired on March 14, 2013. The music is also used in the teaser trailer for the 2013 independent comedy, Exes. The songs "Closer" and "Back in Your Head" were featured in the 2016 video game LOUD on Planet X.

In 2011, Sara was a panellist on the CBC Radio One program Canada Reads, defending Jeff Lemire's graphic novel Essex County. The first graphic novel featured as part of Canada Reads was voted off after the first round but later placed in a "People's Choice" poll, collecting more votes than the other books combined.

In early 2014, Tegan and Sara collaborated with The Lonely Island on a song called "Everything Is Awesome" for The Lego Movie soundtrack. The movie opened in theatres on February 7, 2014. The song debuted at number 62 on the Billboard Hot 100 chart and number 24 on the Official UK Singles Chart. It received an Oscar nomination for Best Original Song at the 87th Annual Academy Awards. In 2016, the twins briefly appeared on Take My Wife, starring Cameron Esposito and River Butcher, through a particular YouTube-released holiday segment.

In September 2017, Tegan appeared as a guest on Esposito's podcast Queery. In October 2017, Sara was a guest on the show. In October 2019, both sisters appeared together on the podcast.

In 2020, their song "Make You Mine This Season" was featured in the film Happiest Season, starring Kristen Stewart and Mackenzie Davis. Clea DuVall, a friend of the duo, directed the film.

In January 2026, Tegan was announced as a panelist on the 25th edition of the CBC book competition Canada Reads, championing The Cure for Drowning, written by Loghan Paylor, a historical fiction book focused on queer Canadian characters. In April, Tegan went on to win Canada Reads 2026.

== Filmography ==
=== Film ===
Year	Title	Role	Notes	Ref.
2006	It's Not Fun, Don't Do It!	Themselves	Video album	
2007	The Con: The Movie	Themselves	Video album	
2011	Get Along	Themselves	Documentary/concert film	
2024	Fanatical: The Catfishing of Tegan and Sara	Themselves	Documentary film	

=== Television ===
Year	Title	Role	Notes	Ref.
2006	The L Word	Themselves	Episode: "Last Dance"	
2012	90210	Themselves	Episode: "The Things We Do for Love"	
2013	MTVU Woodie Awards	Co-hosts	Television special	
2016	Comedy Bang! Bang!	Themselves	Episode: "Tegan and Sara Wear Leather Jackets and Skinny Jeans"	
2022	High School	None	Executive producers	
2023	The Marvelous Mrs. Maisel	Special Performance	Episode: "Four Minutes"	
2023	Canada's Drag Race	Themselves	Season 4, episode 1 - Guest judges	

== Band members ==
- Tegan Quin – vocals, guitar, keyboards
- Sara Quin – vocals, guitar, keyboards

=== Backing musicians ===
- Adam Christgau – drums (2013–2014, 2022–present)
- Kirk Schoenherr – guitar (2023–present)
- Grant Zubritsky – bass, keyboards (2023–present)

=== Former backing musicians ===
- Aaron Burke – drums (1998–1999)
- Marc Tremblay – bass (1998–1999)
- Chris Carlson – bass (2002–2006)
- Rob Chursinoff – drums (2002–2006)
- Ted Gowans – guitar, keyboards (2004–2014)
- Johnny Andrews – drums (2005–2010)
- Dan Kelly – bass (2007)
- Shaun Huberts – bass (2007–2010)
- Jason McGerr – drums (2012)
- Jasper Leak – bass, keyboard bass (2012–2014)
- John Spence – keyboards (2012–2014)
- Eva Gardner – bass (2016)
- Brendan Buckley – drums (2016–2017)
- Vivi Rama – bass (2017)
- Gabrial McNair – keyboards (2016–2017)
- Tim Mislock – guitar (2017)
- Isaac Bolivar – guitar, keyboards (2022)

== Discography ==
- Under Feet Like Ours (1999)
- This Business of Art (2000)
- If It Was You (2002)
- So Jealous (2004)
- The Con (2007)
- Sainthood (2009)
- Heartthrob (2013)
- Love You to Death (2016)
- Hey, I'm Just Like You (2019)
- Crybaby (2022)

== Awards and nominations ==
Tegan and Sara were honoured with the Governor General's Performing Arts Award, 2018.

Year	Award	Category	Nominated work	Result	Ref.
2000	YTV Achievement Award	Band/Musical Group Achievement Award	Tegan and Sara	Won	
2003	Western Canadian Music Awards	Outstanding Pop Recording	If It Was You	Won	
2006	Juno Awards	Alternative Album of the Year	So Jealous	Nominated	
2007	Juno Awards	Music DVD of the Year	It's Not Fun Don't Do It	Nominated	
2008	Juno Awards	Alternative Album of the Year	The Con	Nominated	
2008	Polaris Music Prize	Polaris Music Prize Longlist	The Con	Nominated	
2008	MVPA Awards	Best Alternative Video	The Con	Nominated	
2009	Studio8	Song of August 2009	The Con	Won	
2010	Juno Awards	Alternative Album of the Year	Sainthood	Nominated	
2010	Polaris Music Prize	Polaris Music Prize Shortlist	Sainthood	Nominated	
2010	Western Canadian Music Awards	International Achievement Award	Tegan and Sara	Won	
2011	Indie Awards	Group or Duo of the Year	Tegan and Sara	Nominated	
2012	Juno Awards	Music DVD of the Year	Get Along	Nominated	
2013	Grammy Awards	Best Long Form Music Video	Get Along	Nominated	
2013	MTVU Woodie Awards	Tag Team Woodie	"Body Work"	Nominated	
2013	NewNowNext Awards	That's My Jam	"Closer"	Nominated	
2013	Canadian Radio Music Award	Best New Group - Dance/Urban/Rhythmic	"Closer"	Won	
2013	MuchMusic Video Awards	International Video of the Year by a Canadian	"Closer"	Nominated	
2013	Polaris Music Prize	2013 Polaris Music Prize Shortlist	Heartthrob	Nominated	
2013	MTV Europe Music Awards	Best Canadian Act	Tegan and Sara	Nominated	
2013	Rober Awards Music Poll	Guilty Pleasure	Tegan and Sara	Won	
2014	World Music Awards	World's Best Group	Tegan and Sara	Nominated	
2014	World Music Awards	World's Best Live Act	Tegan and Sara	Nominated	
2014	World Music Awards	World's Best Song	"I Was a Fool"	Nominated	
2014	GLAAD Media Awards	Outstanding Music Artist	Tegan and Sara	Won	
2014	Juno Awards	Group of the Year	Tegan and Sara	Won	
2014	Juno Awards	Songwriter of the Year	Tegan and Sara	Nominated	
2014	Juno Awards	Pop Album of the Year	Heartthrob	Won	
2014	Juno Awards	Single of the Year	"Closer"	Won	
2014	Canadian Radio Music Awards	Best New Group/Solo Artist - Mainstream AC	Tegan and Sara	Won	
2014	Canadian Radio Music Awards	Fans' Choice	Tegan and Sara	Nominated	
2014	Canadian Radio Music Awards	SOCAN Song of the Year	"Closer"	Nominated	
2014	MuchMusic Video Awards	Pop Video of the Year	"Goodbye, Goodbye"	Nominated	
2016	BDSCertified Spin Awards	"Feel It in My Bones" (with Tiësto)	50,000 Spins	Won	
2016	Rober Awards Music Poll	Guilty Pleasure	Tegan and Sara	Nominated	
2017	NME Awards	Best International Band	Tegan and Sara	Nominated	
2017	Juno Awards	Group of the Year	Tegan and Sara	Nominated	
2017	Juno Awards	Songwriter of the Year	Tegan and Sara	Nominated	
2017	Juno Awards	Pop Album of the Year	Love You to Death	Nominated	
2017	GLAAD Media Awards	Outstanding Music Artist	Tegan and Sara	Won	
2017	British LGBT Awards	Best Music Act	Tegan and Sara	Nominated	
2018	British LGBT Awards	Best Music Act	Tegan and Sara	Nominated	
2018	Governor General's Awards	Performing Arts Award	Tegan and Sara	Won	
2018	NYCLU	2018 Liberty Award	Tegan and Sara	Won	
2020	NME Awards	Best Music Book	High School	Nominated	
2020	Queerty Awards	Memorable Memoir	High School	Nominated	
2020	Alex Awards	Top 10 Best Adult Books	High School	Won	
2020	GLAAD Media Awards	Outstanding Music Artist	Hey, I'm Just Like You	Nominated	
2024	Juno Awards of 2024	Juno Humanitarian Award	Tegan and Sara	Won	
2024	Polaris Music Prize	Slaight Family Polaris Heritage Prize, Public Vote	So Jealous	Won	

== Bibliography ==
- High School (2019)
- Junior High (2023)
- Crush (2024)

== See also ==
- List of Canadian bands
