= The Con (album) =

Studio album by Tegan and Sara
- Released: July 24, 2007
- Recorded: January – March 12, 2007, in Portland, Oregon
- Genre: Indie rock; indie pop; alternative rock
- Length: 36:46
- Label: Vapor; Sire; London
- Producer: Tegan and Sara; Chris Walla

Tegan and Sara chronology
So Jealous (2004)	The Con (2007)	I'll Take the Blame (2007)

Singles from The Con
- 1. "Back in Your Head" Released: February 8, 2008; 2. "The Con" Released: February 22, 2008

The Con is the fifth studio album by Canadian indie pop duo Tegan and Sara, released on July 24, 2007. The album charted at number 4 in Canada and at number 34 on the Billboard 200 in the United States. Two singles were released from the album, "Back in Your Head" and "The Con", which both had music videos filmed for them.

Guest performers on the album include Jason McGerr of Death Cab for Cutie, Matt Sharp of The Rentals and formerly of Weezer (on Sara's songs), Hunter Burgan of AFI (on Tegan's songs) and Kaki King.

The title track was featured in rhythm video game Rock Band 3.

== Background ==
The album was written during a period of intense emotional turmoil for both Tegan and Sara. Sara was struggling with Canadian immigration to get her American-born girlfriend a working visa so they could live together, while Tegan was dealing with the breakup of a five-year relationship. The twins were also mourning the death of their grandmother who, according to Tegan, had been like a second mother to them. She stated that these factors combined to make The Con "very dark and also very much about reflecting on getting older, long-term relationships and the end of things". The songs Tegan wrote for The Con were heavily influenced by Against Me!'s album Against Me! as the Eternal Cowboy.

The DVD edition of the album reveals the title track "The Con" was tentatively titled "Encircle Me" and "Like O, Like H" was previously titled "SOS".

== Release ==
In March 2007, the band announced the release of The Con, along with the track listing and other information. The Con was released on July 24, 2007 on CD, vinyl and as a digital download. As announced on their MySpace blog, a special edition CD/DVD was released at the same time as the CD-only version. The CD/DVD release has a Parental Advisory warning for profanity on the DVD, although the CD contains no explicit content. The album debuted at number 4 in the Canadian Albums Chart. The album also debuted at number 34 on the US Billboard 200, selling about 19,000 copies in its first week. In its second week, the album fell out of the top 50, to No. 69, selling about 10,000 that week, totaling at 29,000. The album continued to chart that year until September, when it charted at number 192 before it fell out of the chart completely. In November, they released the I'll Take the Blame EP, which featured "Back in Your Head", a remix of that song, and two new songs, released on CD and as a digital download.

The first single from the album, "Back in Your Head", was released on CD and digital download in February 2008, and a music video was filmed for the song. Two weeks later, "The Con" was released as a single, also receiving a music video. A music video for "Call It Off" was also released on September 15, 2008. They also went on tour for the album, and for the United States portion of their world tour of this album, they have posted a series of videos called "Trailer Talk" on their MySpace profile.

== Critical reception ==
Professional ratings
Review scores
Source	Rating
AbsolutePunk	(92%)
AllMusic	4/5 stars
Entertainment Weekly	B+
The Observer	5/5 stars
Okayplayer	(83%)
Pitchfork	(6.6/10)
Rolling Stone	3.5/5 stars
BBC	(favourable)

The Con received positive reviews from the media, scoring 80 out of 100 on review aggregator Metacritic. AllMusic gave the album four stars out of five, saying that "Though each sister writes and sings lead on seven tracks, it is Sara especially who writes the more intricate pieces ("Relief Next to Me," "Like O, Like H"), showing a more adult songwriter, one who has matured since her first work came out, while Tegan draws more from simpler emo and pop-punk arrangements ("Nineteen," "Hop a Plane"), her songs more straightforward, both compositionally and lyrically, than her sister's." Adding "But this isn't to say that there's a kind of disparity or harsh contrast on The Con." BBC said that "Throughout The Con Tegan and Sara navigate a course that is both experimental and faithful to their pop music past. Alongside the lighter, less emotionally fraught leanings is a countering sharpness that cuts to the quick." Ending the review saying "With chameleonic deftness, Tegan and Sara have created a mystifyingly absurd but extraordinary album."

Filter magazine calls The Con "a startlingly dark, yet characteristically vibrant offering, featuring a band that's learned to harness the energy-highs, while tempering pretty (even pastoral) pop-folk with a new, deeply-affecting brand of melancholy." PopMatters gave The Con a score of 8 out of 10, calling it "very, very good. To be more precise, it is one of the best albums so far of 2007 and one of the best recent pop releases." The A.V. Club says that "ultimately even The Con's failings work in its favor, providing a macro version of what the best Tegan And Sara songs do, by stumbling along recklessly, then falling together."

The Observer writer Sarah Boden gave the album five stars out of five saying that "On The Con, their fifth album, the writing has acquired a melancholy, sophisticated bloom – the 14 songs here have a burnish that initially disguises end-of-the-affair wretchedness. Better still, it doesn't muddle emotion with overwrought hysterics." Ending with "When your heart feels like a stone in your breast, The Con will prove a perfect, sweetly addictive companion." Jessica Suarez of Pitchfork gave the album a 6.6 out of 10 saying that "Yet the record's most interesting bits-- a keen sense of melody-- disappear too quickly and can't carry the album over its production bumps. The edgiest thing about the sisters Quin continues to be their haircuts." Ending that ""Relief Next to Me" thumps like wet newspaper though, her weak similes never building up to a satisfying payoff: a big chorus, a cute melody. "Relief" gets one thing right though: When Sara sings about things "in the dark", you get the feeling that, for much of their young, female audience anyway, they can serve as a beacon."

=== Accolades ===
Year	Nominated work	Award	Result
2008	The Con	Juno Awards, Alternative Album of the Year	Nominated
2008	The Con	Polaris Music Prize Longlist	Nominated
2009	"The Con"	Studio8 Song of August 2009	Won

== Music videos ==
The video for "Back in Your Head" features the duo performing the song in front of an audience of people wearing white clothing and white balaclavas. In the middle there is one person wearing black clothing, and Sara looks over to Tegan and when she turns back the person has gone. Some more people wearing the black clothing appear behind Tegan and Sara, and they run away as the audience suddenly turns from people wearing white clothing to black clothing and balaclavas. The duo eventually find themselves back where they started, except the audience starts going back to people in white clothing and the curtains behind them are closed.

The video for "The Con" features Tegan in a tower block talking to a psychiatrist, while Sara is searching all over the building for her. Sara eventually climbs out of the window and onto the stairs outside and climbs to the room in which Tegan is in. The psychiatrist suddenly faints, when Sara knocks on the window. Tegan lets Sara in and they run out of the room and try to escape the building. Near the end of the video, there are shots of Tegan in her bed dreaming of her drowning in a bath interspersed in the video. The video ends as Tegan manages to get herself out of the water, and she wakes up from the dream.

The video for "Call It Off" features Tegan in the middle of a room singing the song as Sara wraps colourful telephone cables around her.

== Commercial performance ==
The Con debuted at number four on the Canadian Albums Chart. The album was eventually certified gold by Music Canada for sales of over 50,000 copies in Canada. In the United States, the album charted at number 34 on the US Billboard 200 chart. The Con marked Tegan and Sara's first chart entry not only in North America but internationally, peaking at number 32 in Australia and number 47 in Belgium.

== Track listing ==
No.	Title	Writer(s)	Length
1.	"I Was Married"	Sara Quin	1:32
2.	"Relief Next to Me"	S. Quin	3:01
3.	"The Con"	Tegan Quin	3:30
4.	"Knife Going In"	S. Quin	2:10
5.	"Are You Ten Years Ago"	T. Quin	3:17
6.	"Back in Your Head"	S. Quin	3:00
7.	"Hop a Plane"	T. Quin	1:49
8.	"Soil, Soil"	T. Quin	1:23
9.	"Burn Your Life Down"	S. Quin	2:22
10.	"Nineteen"	T. Quin	2:56
11.	"Floorplan"	S. Quin	3:38
12.	"Like O, Like h"	S. Quin	2:40
13.	"Dark Come Soon"	T. Quin	3:07
14.	"Call It Off"	T. Quin	2:21
Total length:			36:46

DVD features

- The Con: The Movie (Making of the album)
- Extras
  - Ptosis: Explained
  - Ptosis Outtakes
  - Duct Tape Dreads
  - Feelings Report
  - Video Chapters

== Tegan and Sara Present the Con X: Covers ==
On October 20, 2017, the duo released a compilation album titled Tegan and Sara Present the Con X: Covers, to celebrate the tenth anniversary of The Con. The compilation contains covers of each song performed by various artists, as well as a previously unreleased demo “Miami Still”, performed by the duo.

No.	Title	Performer(s)	Length
1.	"I Was Married"	Ruth B.	1:34
2.	"Relief Next to Me"	Muna	2:57
3.	"The Con"	Shura	4:25
4.	"Knife Going In"	Mykki Blanco	3:20
5.	"Are You Ten Years Ago"	Pvris	4:40
6.	"Back in Your Head"	Ryan Adams	3:09
7.	"Hop a Plane"	City and Colour	2:41
8.	"Soil, Soil"	Kelly Lee Owens	2:19
9.	"Burn Your Life Down"	Bleachers	2:40
10.	"Nineteen"	Hayley Williams	4:11
11.	"Floorplan"	Sara Bareilles	3:48
12.	"Like O, Like H"	Shamir	2:35
13.	"Dark Come Soon"	Trashique (Grimes X Hana)	3:00
14.	"Call It Off"	Chvrches	5:00
15.	"Back in Your Head"	Cyndi Lauper	3:41
16.	"One Second"	Bleached	3:10
17.	"I Take All the Blame"	Vivek Shraya	3:04
18.	"Miami Still" (Demo)	Tegan and Sara	3:36
Total length:			59:50

Notes

- Ryan Adams’s cover of “Back in Your Head” is not available on the US edition of the compilation. Cyndi Lauper’s cover is placed on track 6 on the US edition.

== Personnel ==
- Tegan Quin – guitars, keyboards, piano, vocals
- Sara Quin – guitars, keyboards, piano, vocals
- Christopher Walla – guitars (6, 10), keyboards (12), organ (6), shakers (6), cymbals (5), tiny guitars (5, 14), bass (4, 9)
- Ted Gowans – guitars (2, 3, 6, 7, 9, 10, 14), keyboards (2, 4, 5, 6, 10, 11, 12, 13), organ (13)
- Matt Sharp – bass (1, 2, 4, 6, 9, 11, 12) on all of Sara's songs
- Hunter Burgan – bass (3, 5, 7, 8, 10, 13, 14) on all of Tegan's songs
- Kaki King – lap steel (4), guitar (11)
- Jason McGerr – drums, percussion
- Ted Jensen - Mastering

== Charts ==
=== Weekly charts ===
Chart (2007)	Peak position
Australian Albums Chart (ARIA)	32
Belgian Albums (Flanders)	47
Canadian Albums Chart	4
US Billboard 200	34
US Alternative Albums	11
US Digital Albums	17
US Top Rock Albums	10
US Tastemaker Albums	4

== Certifications ==
Region	Certification	Certified units/sales
Canada (Music Canada)	Gold	50,000^{^}
^{^} Shipments figures based on certification alone.

== Release history ==
Region	Date	Label	Edition
Canada	July 24, 2007	Vapor, Sire	Standard; DVD
United States	July 24, 2007	Vapor, Sire	Standard; DVD
Australia	July 24, 2007	Vapor, Sire	Standard
Belgium	July 24, 2007	Vapor, Sire	Standard
United Kingdom	February 25, 2008	London	Standard
