= Billy Bush (music producer) =

American musician

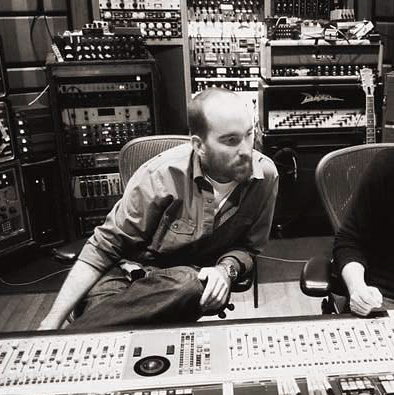

Background information
- Origin: St Louis, Missouri, US
- Genres: Rock
- Occupations: Musician, songwriter, record producer, audio engineer, remixer
- Instrument: Guitars
- Years active: 1996–present
- Spouse: Shirley Manson (m. 2010)

Billy Bush is a multi-Grammy nominated American record producer, audio engineer and mixer known for his work with Garbage, The Naked and Famous, Neon Trees, Julia Stone, Fink, Foster the People, Muse, Natasha Bedingfield, Jake Bugg, Ilse DeLange, and The Boxer Rebellion. He lives in Los Angeles and works from his studio Red Razor Sounds in Atwater Village.

In 1995, Bush was hired by Garbage to help reconcile the band's technology needs with their live performance for their first concert tour. Initially a guitar technician, he was promoted to production manager and live engineer. He remained with the group and performed audio engineering duties on each of their subsequent albums, working closely with Butch Vig. He later worked alongside Vig on records for artists including Beck, Alanis Morissette, Limp Bizkit, Korn and Ash. In 2010, Bush married Garbage lead singer Shirley Manson. He is currently represented by Global Positioning Services management.

== Discography ==
Artist	Year	Name of work	Producer	Engineer	Mixer
Garbage	2025	Let All That We Imagine Be the Light	check	check	check
Garbage	2021	No Gods No Masters	check	check	check
Dolly Parton	2019	Dumplin' (soundtrack)			check
Slothrust	2018	The Pact	check	check	check
Paul McCartney	2018	Egypt Station		check	
Willa Amai	2018	"Harder Better Faster Stronger"			check
L7	2017	Scatter the Rats	check	check	check
OpenSide	2017	Push Back			check
Vikings	2017	Animal Kingdom			check
Garbage	2016	Strange Little Birds	ad-P	check	check
The Boxer Rebellion	2016	Ocean by Ocean	check	check	check
Grizfolk	2016	Waking Up The Giants	check	check	check
James Lavelle	2015	Global Underground 041: Naples			check
Lupe Fiasco	2015	Tetsuo & Youth			check
Dweezil Zappa	2015	Via Zammata'			check
Angus & Julia Stone	2014	Angus & Julia Stone			check
Fink	2014	Hard Believer	check	check	check
The Boxer Rebellion	2013	Promises	check	check	check
Tegan And Sara	2013	"Closer" – Heartthrob		check	
Jake Bugg	2013	Shangri La			check
Against Me!	2013	Transgender Dysphoria Blues			check
NO	2013	El Prado			check
The Naked And Famous	2013	In Rolling Waves		check	
Superbus	2012	Sunset	check	check	check
Garbage	2012	Not Your Kind of People	ad-P	check	check
Neon Trees	2012	Picture Show		check	check
Mr Little Jeans	2012	"Rescue Song" (The Naked and Famous remix)			check
Snow Patrol	2012	"In The End" – Fallen Empires			check
Foster the People	2011	"Helena Beat" – Torches		check	
Fink	2011	Perfect Darkness	check	check	check
Maritime	2011	Human Hearts	ex-P		check
The Boxer Rebellion	2011	"Losing You" – The Cold Still			check
Against Me!	2011	White Crosses		check	
The Naked And Famous	2010	Passive Me, Aggressive You			check
Never Shout Never	2010	Harmony		check	
Lunakate	2010	「dégagé」			check
Muse	2010	"Neutron Star Collision" – The Twilight Saga: Eclipse			check
Get Him to the Greek	2010	(Score and soundtrack)			check
Ilse Delange	2010	Live at Ahoy DVD & CD			check
Guy Sebastian	2009	Like It Like That		check	
Ilse DeLange	2008	Incredible		check	check
Laura Jane Grace	2008	Heart Burns	co-P	check	check
The Subways	2008	All Or Nothing		check	
Pat Monahan	2007	Last of Seven		check	check
Against Me!	2007	New Wave		check	
Eric Avery	2007	Help Wanted	co-P	check	check
Garbage	2007	Absolute Garbage		check	
Garbage	2005	Bleed Like Me		check	
Garbage	2001	Beautiful Garbage		check	
Garbage	1999	"The World Is Not Enough" (James Bond theme song)		check	
Garbage	1998	Version 2.0		check	

== Discography sources ==
- Billy Bush at AllMusic
- Billy Bush discography at Discogs
