= The Unanswered Question =

Musical work by Charles Ives, early twentieth century

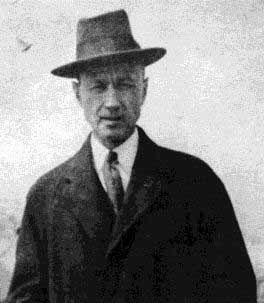
Charles Ives in 1913

The Unanswered Question is a musical work by American composer Charles Ives. Originally paired with Central Park in the Dark as Two Contemplations in 1908, (Note: The Unanswered Question is often erroneously dated 1906. The original sketch has "The unanswered Q??" marked above it.) The Unanswered Question was revised by Ives in 1930–1935. As with many of Ives' works, it was largely unknown until much later in his life, and was not performed until 1946.

Against a background of slow, quiet strings representing "The Silence of the Druids", a solo trumpet poses "The Perennial Question of Existence", to which a woodwind quartet of "Fighting Answerers" tries vainly to provide an answer, growing more frustrated and dissonant until they give up. The three groups of instruments perform in independent tempos and are located separately, with the strings offstage.

== Composition ==
The score of The Unanswered Question printed by Southern Music Publishing in 1953 lists the following three instrumental groups:

- A woodwind quartet. The foreword to the score states "If a large string orchestra is playing, the full treble woodwind choir may be used at the discretion of the conductor..."
  - Flute I
  - Flute II
  - Flute III (or Oboe)
  - Flute IV (or Clarinet)
- A solo instrument, preferably a trumpet. The Foreword states "the trumpet should use a mute unless playing in a very large room, or with a larger string orchestra."
  - Trumpet (or English Horn, or Oboe or Clarinet)
- A string quartet or string orchestra (con sordini). The Foreword states that the group "if possible, should be 'off stage', or away from the trumpet and flutes." It also states: "If more than four strings, a basso may play with the 'cellos (8va basso). The strings play ppp throughout with no change in tempo."
  - Violin I
  - Violin II
  - Viola
  - Violoncello (8va Contrabass)

The groups play in independent tempos, and typically require separate conductors.

Ives provided a short text by which to interpret the work, giving it a narrative as in program music. Throughout the piece the strings sustain slow tonal triads that, according to Ives, represent "The Silence of the Druids — who Know, See and Hear Nothing". Against this background, the trumpet poses a nontonal phrase — "The Perennial Question of Existence" — seven times, to which the woodwinds "answer" the first six times in an increasingly erratic way. Ives wrote that the woodwinds' answers represented "Fighting Answerers" who, after a time, "realize a futility and begin to mock 'The Question'" before finally disappearing, leaving "The Question" to be asked once more before "The Silences" are left to their "Undisturbed Solitude". The piece ends with the strings "hum[ming] softly in the distance, like the eternal music of the spheres."

The strings twice repeat a pianississimo thirteen-bar progression, so slowly it has a static feel. It uses voice leading, passing tones, and ornamental notes in a manner reminiscent of a hymn or chorale. After the repetition, the strings' part varies in subtle ways that are difficult for the listener to detect. In contrast to this ever-changing but seemingly regular "Silence", the trumpet repeats the same "Question": five notes, of which the last alternates between C and B. It is the woodwinds' atonal answers that change in obvious ways, growing increasingly agitated and dissonant. After the woodwinds finally give up, the trumpet poses the question quietly one last time.

== History ==
Ives composed The Unanswered Question, parenthetically subtitled "a Cosmic Landscape" in Ives's work papers, in 1908 (though it is often erroneously dated 1906), and revised it in 1930–1935, at which time he included a 13-bar introduction, made the woodwind parts more dissonant, and added further dynamic and articulation indications. He also made a small but significant change to the "question motif", which had originally ended on the note that began it, but now remained unresolved.

During 1930–1935 he also worked on a version of The Unanswered Question for chamber orchestra. The premiere performance of this version occurred on May 11, 1946 at McMillin Theatre, Columbia University in New York City, played by a chamber orchestra of graduate students from the Juilliard School and conducted by Edgar Schenkman (on-stage), with the strings led by Theodore Bloomfield (off-stage). The same concert featured the premieres of Central Park in the Dark and String Quartet No. 2. (Note: Elliott Carter recalled: "Two of the works that intrigued me a great deal were The Unanswered Question and Central Park in the Dark. As I was then teaching at Columbia University and there was an annual Ditson Festival, I persuaded the festival committee to include premieres of these two works on the program [May 11, 1946]. I wrote to Mrs. Ives to ask if these were in fact first performances and for other program information. She wrote back a very charming letter quoting her ill husband, that they would not want to say those works were having their premieres - Mrs. Ives wanted to be fair to those 'old fellers' who had played them in between the acts of a theatrical performance around 1907 or 1908.") The first recording of the piece by the Polymusic Chamber Orchestra conducted by Will Lorin was released in 1951 on the Polymusic label.

The original version of the work was not premiered until March 17, 1984, when Dennis Russell Davies and the American Composers Orchestra performed it at Symphony Space in New York City as part of the "Wall-to-Wall Ives" series.

In 1985, Paul Echols and Noel Zahler produced an edition of The Unanswered Question that included both the original version and the revised 1930–1935 edition. Echols and Zahler were fortunate in that sufficiently complete sources were available to work from for both scores.

== Notational and performance considerations ==
In his essay "The Rhythmic Basis of American Music," Elliott Carter noted that "the combination of different rhythmic planes involved Ives in complex problems of notation." In The Unanswered Question, the strings and trumpet play at a tempo marked "Largo molto sempre". But meanwhile the winds gradually accelerate, with tempo markings for the six "Answers" of Adagio, Andante, Allegretto, Allegro, Allegro molto, and Allegro, accel to Presto, and their bar lines going out of sync with those of the other instruments. In the foreword to the score, Ives wrote that the wind's music "need not be played in the exact time position indicated. It is played in somewhat of an impromptu way..." He also noted: "'The Answers' may be played somewhat sooner after each 'Question' than indicated in the score, but 'The Question' should be played no sooner for that reason." Regarding the ending of the piece, Ives wrote: "The flutes will end their part approximately near the position indicated in the string score; but in any case, 'The Last Question' should not be played by the trumpet until 'The Silences' of the strings in the distance have been heard for a measure or two. The strings will continue their last chord for two measures or so after the trumpet stops. If the strings shall have reached their last chord before the trumpet plays 'The Last Question', they will hold it through and continue after, as suggested above."

In terms of dynamics, the strings play ppp throughout, fading to pppp at the end. The trumpet plays p throughout, except for the last "Question", which is pp. The winds, however, gradually increase in loudness: dynamic markings for the six "Answers" are p, mp, mf, f < ff, f < ff, and ff < fff < ffff. Ives noted: "During some of the louder passages of the flutes, the strings may not be heard, and it is not important that they should be."

== Views ==
Linda Mack called The Unanswered Question "a study in contrasts. Strings intone slow diatonic, triadic chords; a solo trumpet asks the question seven times; the flutes try to answer the question, each time getting more and more agitated and atonal." Leonard Bernstein added in his 1973 Norton Lectures, which borrowed its title from the Ives work, that the woodwinds are said to represent our human answers growing increasingly impatient and desperate, until they lose their meaning entirely. Meanwhile, right from the very beginning, the strings have been playing their own separate music, infinitely soft and slow and sustained, never changing, never growing louder or faster, never being affected in any way by that strange question-and-answer dialogue of the trumpet and the woodwinds. Bernstein also talks about how the strings are playing tonal triads against the trumpet's non tonal phrase. In the end, when the trumpet asks the question for the last time, the strings "are quietly prolonging their pure G major triad into eternity". This piece graphically represents the 20th century dichotomy of both tonal and atonal music occurring at the same time.

Another view of the piece was written by Austin Frey:

The 'cosmic landscape' of The Unanswered Question, a trumpet repeatedly poses 'the eternal question of existence' against a haunting background of strings, finally to be answered by an eloquent silence. By that work of 1906, Ives was over half a century ahead of his time, writing in collage-like planes of contrasting styles. In 1951, the Polymusic Chamber Orchestra, conducted by Will Lorin, first recorded the piece.

Henry and Sidney Cowell wrote: "Silence is represented by soft slow-moving concordant tones widely spaced in the strings; they move through the whole piece with uninterrupted placidity. After they have gone on long enough to establish their mood, loud wind instruments cut through the texture with a dissonant raucous melody that ends with the upturned inflection of the Question."

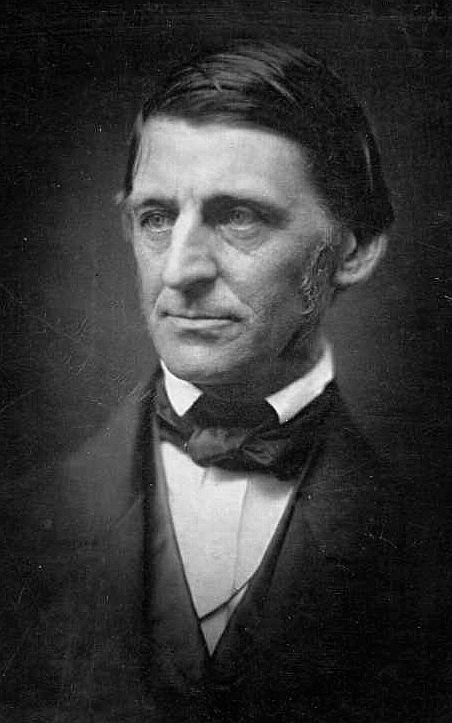
Ives may have been quoting the line "Thou art the unanswered question" from Emerson's 1847 poem "The Sphinx".

Ives scholar Wayne Shirley believed that The Unanswered Question shared "imagery, structure, and worldview" with "The Sphinx" (1847) by American Transcendentalist poet Ralph Waldo Emerson, and that the title derived from a line from the poem: "Thou art the unanswered question". While at Yale, Ives wrote his senior essay on Emerson, and shortly after composing The Unanswered Question, he composed his Emerson Overture, parts of which were later incorporated into the Concord Sonata.

Matthew McDonald noted that Ives "recalled how The Unanswered Question was one of several pieces that was 'played — or better tried out — usually ending in a fight or hiss...'" shortly after its composition. He concludes that "It is possible... to associate the Answerers with Ives's public, initially confused by, and ultimately dismissing and mocking, his music... We might... conceive of The Unanswered Question, then, as thickly veiled autobiography, in which Ives elevated the trope of the misunderstood artist to the loftiest heights imaginable, a struggle of cosmic proportions."

== Reception and legacy ==
Ives biographer Jan Swafford called the piece "a kind of collage in three distinct layers, roughly coordinated". Aaron Copland, who often conducted the composition, considered it to be "among the finest works ever created by an American artist".

Ives use of separate groups of instruments placed apart on the stage and playing in independent tempos influenced the work of American composer Henry Brant.

== In popular culture ==
The music was used in the 1972 short film directed by Donald Fox based on the tale "Young Goodman Brown" by author Nathaniel Hawthorne. It was also used in the 1998 film Run Lola Run.

"The Unanswered Question" was also used in The Thin Red Line (1998), performed by Orchestra of St. Luke's and conducted by John Adams.

The part for strings was also used at the end of Terence Davies' biopic of Emily Dickinson, A Quiet Passion (2016). It is performed by the Brussels Philharmonic.

The piece was also used in Oliver Hermanus' 2020 film Moffie.

It was performed on electronic instruments by Japanese synthesist Isao Tomita on his 1978 album Kosmos.

The introduction was reused by Owen Pallett for an alternative version of the song "The CN Tower Belongs to the Dead" as a B-side of the "Many Lives → 49 MP" single; it is humorously called the "Many Ives version" as a clear reference to Charles Ives. This version is also played live with orchestras.

A version of the composition was also performed on the 2013 Fink album, Fink Meets the Royal Concertgebouw Orchestra.
