= Martin Harley (musician) =

Welsh musician

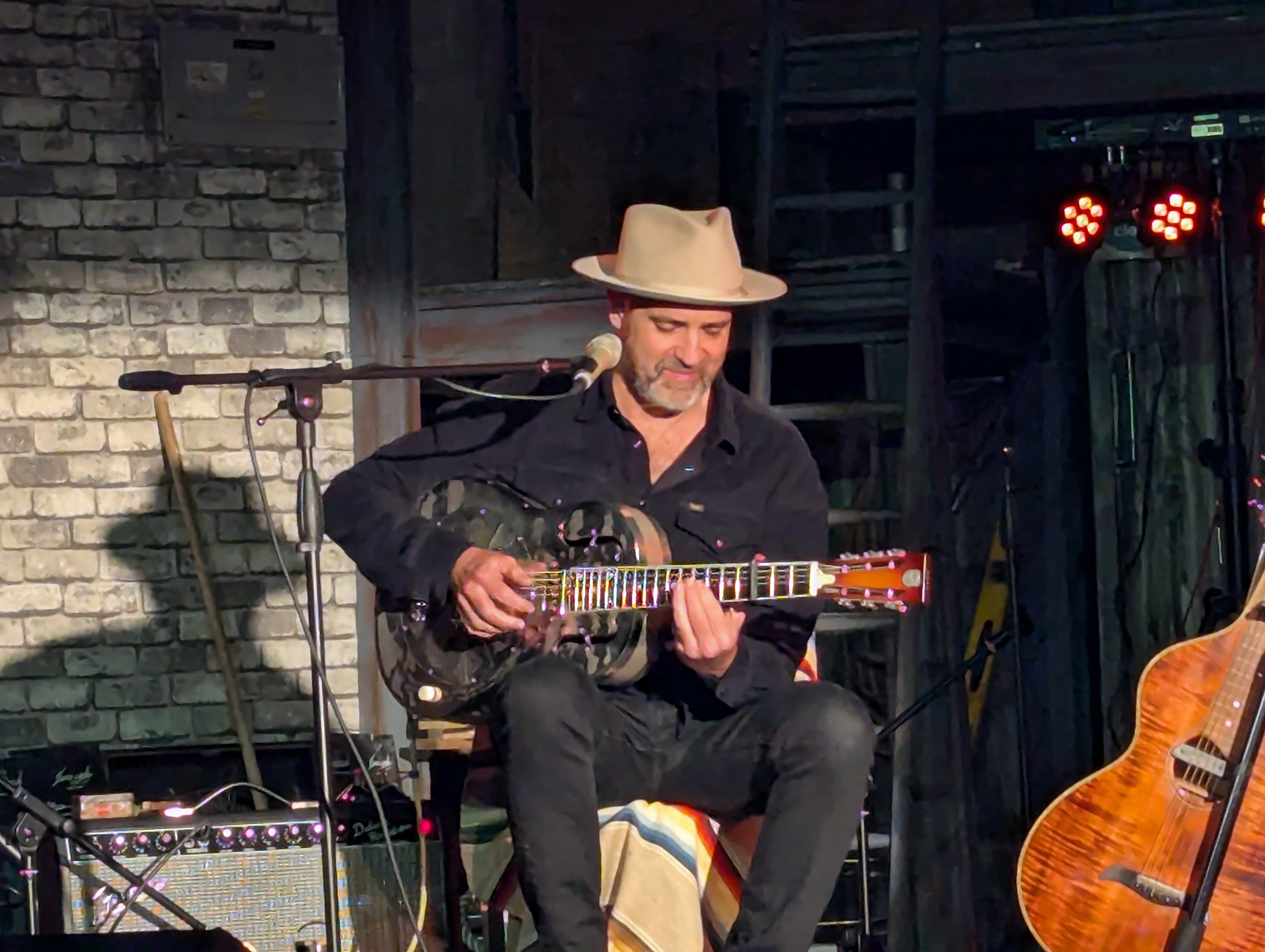
- Martin Harley performing at Bromley blues club

Background information
- Born: 1975 (age 50–51); Cardiff, Wales
- Genres: Folk, blues
- Label: Villainous Records
- Website: martinharley.com

Martin Harley is a Welsh singer-songwriter and slide guitarist. He focuses on roots music and blues and has released several albums.

== Biography ==
Martin Harley was born in 1975 in Cardiff, Wales. He later moved with his family to Woking, Surrey.

=== Musical career ===
==== Band ====
Harley was the founder of The Martin Harley Band, a British blues trio which toured in the United Kingdom and abroad. The band was noted for its use of obscure instrumentation, including a Weissenborn acoustic guitar, balalaika, cocktail drum kit, cajon and double bass. It also featured laptop slide guitar and three-part vocal harmonies.

The band released five albums on independent record labels and appeared on the Aled Jones, Bob Harris and Johnnie Walker shows on BBC Radio 2. They appeared on a charity compilation album which was sold to raise money for Rural Revival and CARE International.

==== Solo career ====
Harley performs solo as Martin Harley. His musical genre is roots and blues. He established a solo career in the United States after the release of his first album, Mojo Fix, in 2012, for which he collaborated in Texas with former Los Angeles studio bassist and producer Bob Parr. He launched Mojo Fix in Boulder, Colorado, gained airplay on non-commercial, adult alternative radio across the US, and performed concerts in the US and the UK.

Mojo Fix was the first time that Harley had worked with outside musicians and featured a rock-tinged approach, with more use made of the Weissenborn guitar. Guest musicians on the album included Santana and Steve Winwood veteran Walfredo Reyes on drums; McKenzie Smith of Midlake; and Charlie Bisharat, a violinist known for his work with Shadowfax. Harley recorded a solo album in Australia at the beginning of his recording career.

Harley has been interviewed by Guitarist magazine, and featured in a three DVD set providing slide guitar tips and tricks.

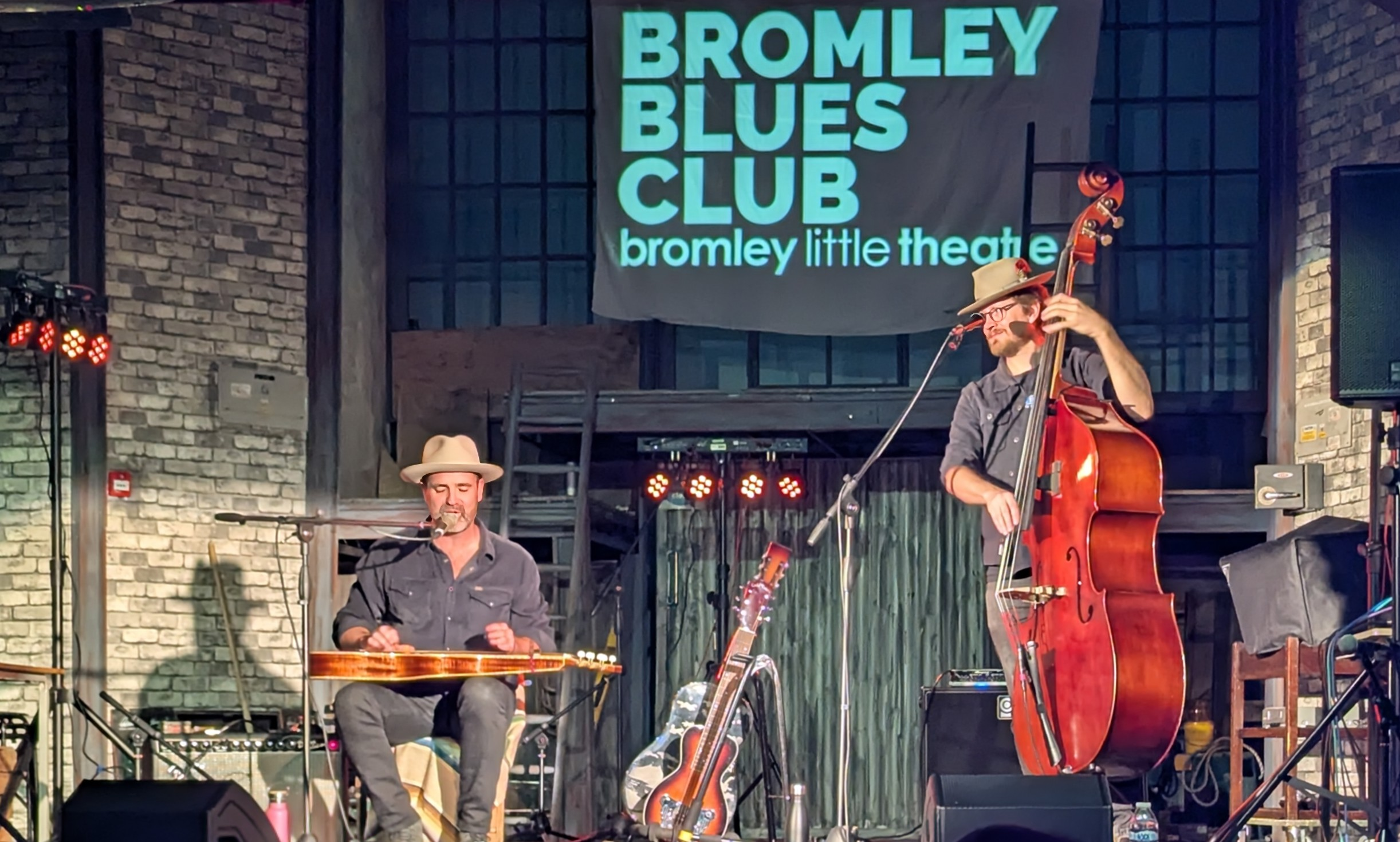
Harley playing a Weissenborn slide guitar

=== Travel ===
In 2005, Harley participated in what the Guinness World Records has recognised as the 'Highest Gig in the World', in which he played at an elevation of 21,000 feet on Kala Patthar in the Himalayas.

In early 2007, he spent six weeks travelling through Mali, Guinea and Senegal and playing with local musicians, including Malian singer/guitarist Vieux Farka Toure. The visit was recorded by a French film crew. A CD and DVD were scheduled for release.

In 2010, Harley undertook the "Blues Gone Green Tour", a 27-show, 1,200-mile acoustic tour of the UK by bicycle over thirty-one days. The tour was supported by the charities Sustrans and Villages in Action, and the Rural Touring Circuit.

=== Collaborations ===
Harley's slide guitar work can be heard on Kate Walsh's Tim's House, Fink's Biscuits for Breakfast, and Hardkandy's Second to None.

== Discography ==
- Martin Harley (2003) (self release)
- Money Don't Matter (2005) Transistor Records
- Grow Your Own (2008) – mastered by Bob Katz.
- Drumrolls for Sommersaults (2010) Villainous Records – produced by Nigel Stonier and featuring Thea Gilmore on the track "Hand to Hold".
- Mojo Fix (2012)60/20 Records – produced by Bob Parr and featuring "Mojo Fix", "Cardboard King", "Ball & Chain" and "Outlaw"
- Live At Southern Ground (2015) Del Mundo Records - with Daniel Kimbro (upright bass), recorded without edits at Southern Ground studio in Nashville
- Static In The Wires (2017) Del Mundo Records - with Daniel Kimbro (upright bass), feat. Jerry Douglas, Derek Mixon and Micah Hulscher
- Roll With The Punches (2019)
- Morning Sun (2024)
