= Sort of Revolution =

Studio album by Fink
- Released: 25 May 2009
- Recorded: at 7Dials Studios, Brighton, UK
- Label: Ninja Tune ZEN146

Fink chronology
Distance and Time (2007)	Sort of Revolution (2009)	Perfect Darkness (2011)

Professional ratings
Review scores
Source	Rating
BBC Music	(positive)
NME	7/10 stars
Rockfeedback	3/5 stars
Sputnik Music	2.5/5 stars
Tiny Mix Tapes	3.5/5 stars

Sort of Revolution is the fourth album of original studio material from British musician Fink, also known as Fin Greenall. It was released on 25 May 2009, on the Ninja Tune independent record label.

== Track listing ==
All tracks are written by Fin Greenall, except where noted.

No.	Title	Writer(s)	Length
1.	"Sort of Revolution"		6:33
2.	"Move on Me"	Greenall, John Legend	3:38
3.	"Six Weeks"	Greenall, Guy Whittaker	3:03
4.	"Nothing Is Ever Finished"		4:07
5.	"See It All"		5:13
6.	"Q & A"	Greenall, Whittaker	6:16
7.	"If I Had a Million"		4:43
8.	"Pigtails"		3:51
9.	"Maker"	Greenall, Legend	5:35
10.	"Walking in the Sun"	Jeff Barry	3:18

== Personnel ==
Fink

- Fin Greenall – vocals, acoustic guitar, Vox (tracks 1, 3), electric guitar (4), percussion (5, 6), electric piano (6), synthesizer (6), keyboards (9)
- Guy Whittaker – bass (exc. 7), effects (9)
- Tim Thornton – drums (exc. 3, 7), effects (9)

Additional musicians

- Blair Mackichan – piano (1, 5, 6), Wurlitzer organ (6)
- John Legend – piano (2)
- Ellie Wyatt – string arrangement (2)
- Son of Dave – harmonica (8)
- Andrea Triana – backing vocals (10)

Technical personnel

- Produced by Fin Greenall
- Recorded by Fin Greenall and Guy Whittaker at 7Dials Studios, Brighton, except

the piano on "Move on Me" recorded by Anthony "Rocky" Gallo at The Cutting Room, New York City, and
the acoustic percussion on "See It All" recorded by Kieron Menzies at Track Record, Los Angeles.

- Mixed by Fin Greenall at 7Dials Studios, Brighton
- Mastered by Kevin Metcalfe at The Soundmasters, London
- Artwork by Kate O'Connor
- Design by Panda Yoghurt

== Chart performance ==
Chart (2011)	Peak position
French Albums (SNEP)	136
Dutch Albums (Album Top 100)	60
