= I'm Not Your Hero =

2012 promotional single by Tegan and Sara

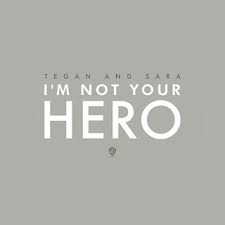

Promotional single by Tegan and Sara

from the album Heartthrob
- Released: October 21, 2012
- Recorded: 2012
- Studio: Echo Studio (Los Angeles, California); EastWest Studios (Hollywood, California)
- Genre: New wave; synthpop
- Length: 3:51
- Label: Warner Bros.
- Songwriters: Tegan Quin; Sara Quin
- Producer: Greg Kurstin

"I'm Not Your Hero" is a song written, recorded and performed by Canadian duo Tegan and Sara and produced by Greg Kurstin for the album Heartthrob (2013). Recorded at Echo Studio and EastWest Studios in California in 2012, it was released on October 21 of that year as a promotional single. The lyrics for the new wave synthpop ballad were written by Sara Quin, and discuss her teenage life in the 1990s when she was unable to identify with the lives of pop culture figures and had unforeseen thoughts about her later life. Guitar chords, drums, bass guitar, synths and harmonized vocals are also played in the track.

"I'm Not Your Hero" was mostly well received by critics for its songwriting and composition. The track garnered comparisons to the works of Santigold, Fleetwood Mac and The Temper Trap. Commercially, it peaked at number 58 on the Billboard Canadian Hot 100 and 157 on the French SNEP singles chart. Tegan and Sara have performed it at the Austin City Limits Music Festival, their Let's Make Things Physical tour, and on shows and services such as Soundcheck and Queen's TV.

== Production and composition ==
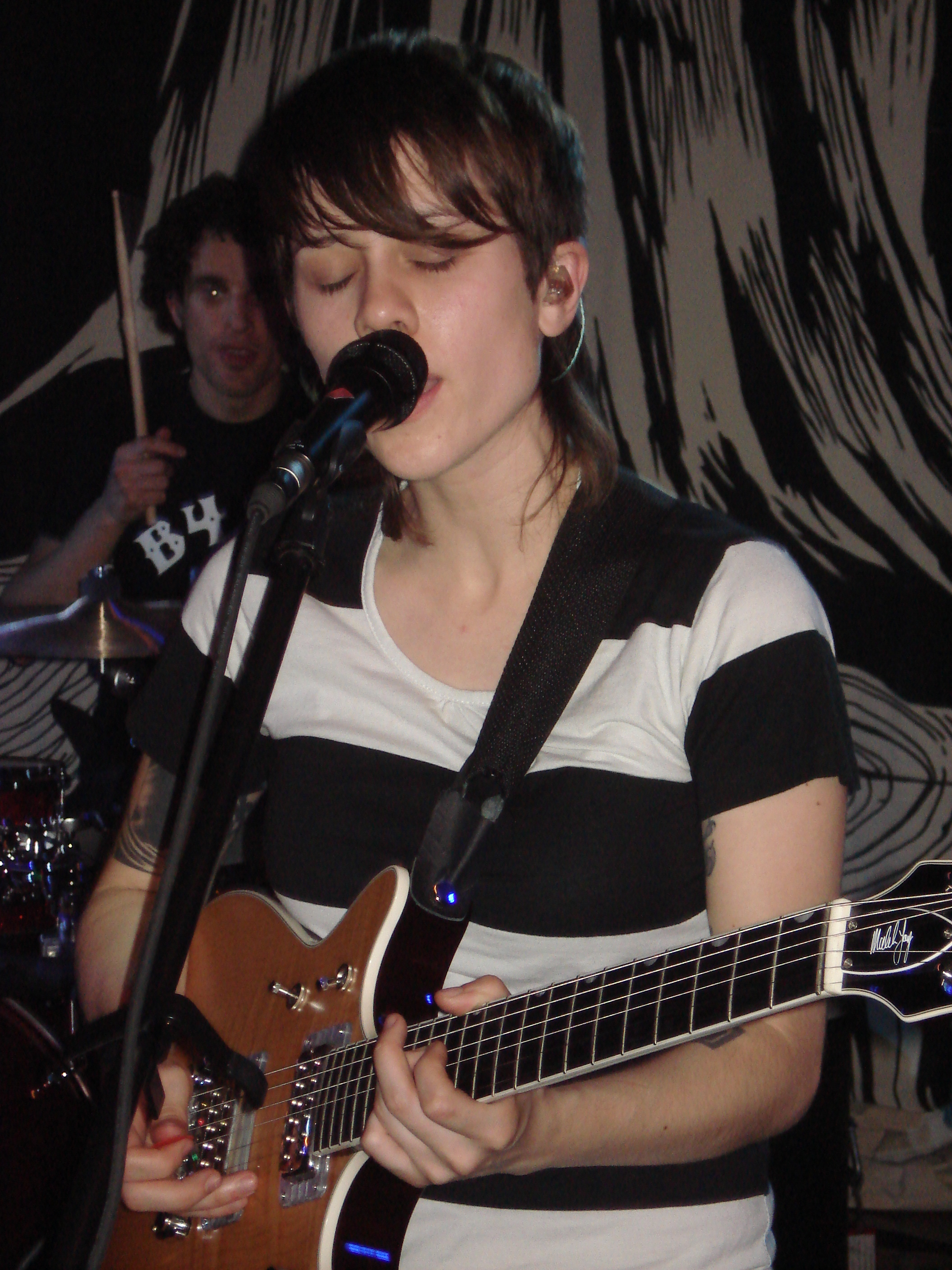
Sara Quin wrote "I'm Not Your Hero" based on her inability to identify with the lives of pop culture figures, as well as her political views and her sexuality.

In November 2011, it was revealed on Tegan and Sara Quinn's official website that they were writing new material for their seventh studio album: "[we] are back in our home studios working away at more songs. We’re really looking forward to making a new record now. Our hope is to be in the studio by early 2012." "I'm Not Your Hero" was written for the album, which was later named Heartthrob and recorded between February and May 2012. Sara, who wrote the lyrics, said the song was based on her life as a teenager when she was unable to identify with the lives of pop culture figures and had unforeseen thoughts about her future. She claimed the lyrics were about her political views from watching The West Wing, her identity and her sexuality. Tegan stated that when Sara showed the song to her and the producers, it was initially more of a love song and much more acoustic and slow than the final mix that would be released, and said she "was haunted by it almost immediately. I found the verses to be quintessential Sara."

According to the sheet music published at Musicnotes.com by Naked in a Snowsuit Publishing, the new wave synthpop ballad is performed in common time at a tempo of 122 beats per minute. It is composed in the key of A Major, with the vocal range spanning from E_{4} to D_{6}. A chord progression of A5−E5−F♯m−Dmaj7−F♯m−E−Dmaj7 is followed in the verse, D−A in the pre-chorus, and D−E−F♯m−D in the chorus. The track opens with guitar chords before loud drums are played. Harmonized vocals, bass guitar and blurred synthesizers are also parts of the track's arrangement. Reviewers made comparisons of its musical structure to songs such as "L.E.S. Artistes" by Santigold, The Temper Trap's "Sweet Disposition", and the works of Fleetwood Mac.

== Release and live performances ==
"I'm Not Your Hero" was first available for digital download in the United Kingdom as part of their compilation extended play called In Your Head: An Introduction to Tegan and Sara, which was issued on October 19, 2012. On October 21, it was released as a promotional single for worldwide streaming. It received mostly positive reviews from critics upon its release, some calling it one of the best songs off Heartthrob. Brodsky described it as "a track that honors their previous work but shows their dedication to musical development." Bryne Yancey of Punknews.org wrote the song "blows out its chorus rather impressively from the verses with some neat, alternated instrumentation." A more mixed opinion came from Billboard's Jason Lipshutz; he praised the song's "eloquent" message, but felt the track overall was not as engaging as the other songs on the album.

In an interview with MTV Hive, Tegan and Sara said "I'm Not Your Hero" was one of their favorite songs to perform live. The duo first did so, along with "Now I'm All Messed Up" and "I Was a Fool", in Vancouver on September 23, 2012. They performed it at the 2012 Austin City Limits Music Festival, and the song was also a part of the set list of their 2014 "Let's Make Things Physical" promotional tour. In April 2014, the pair played it at the Juno Awards in Burton Cummings Theatre live on Queen's TV. The duo has performed two acoustic renditions of the song, one in November 2012 in a studio session for Alter The Press!, and in July 2013 on their interview by the WNYC program Soundcheck.

== Credits and personnel ==
The following information adapted from the liner notes of Heartthrob:

Locations

- Recorded and engineered at Echo Studio, Los Angeles, California; drums recorded at EastWest Studios, Hollywood, California
- Mixed at Larrabee Sound Studios, Los Angeles, California
- Mastered at Bernie Grundman Mastering, Hollywood, California.

Personnel

- Songwriting, vocals – Tegan Quin, Sara Quin
- Production, recording, engineering, programming, keyboards, guitar, bass – Greg Kurstin
- Drums recording – Billy Bush
- Drums recording assistant – Andrew Ford, Jeremy Miller
- Additional engineer – Jesse Shatkin
- Mixing – Manny Marroquin
- Mixing assistant – Chris Galland, Del Bowers
- Mastering – Brian Gardner

== Charts ==
Chart (2013–14)	Peak position
Canada Hot 100 (Billboard)	58
Canada AC (Billboard)	11
Canada CHR/Top 40 (Billboard)	43
Canada Hot AC (Billboard)	16
France (SNEP)	157
