= Sorry I'm Late (disambiguation) =

Sorry I'm Late is a 2014 album by Cher Lloyd.

Sorry I'm Late may also refer to:

- Sorry I'm Late (John Regan album), 2010
- Sorry I'm Late (Mae Muller album), 2023
- Sorry I'm Late, a 2021 EP by Bnxn
- "Sorry I'm Late", song by Fink from Biscuits for Breakfast
- "Sorry I'm Late", 2011 KBS2 Korean drama with Yoon Joo-sang
- Sorry I'm Late, an art exhibition by Anthea Hamilton at Firstsite
