= I Was a Fool =

Single by Tegan and Sara

from the album Heartthrob
- Released: April 24, 2013
- Recorded: 2012
- Genre: Pop
- Length: 3:24
- Label: Vapor; Warner Bros. Records
- Songwriters: Tegan Quin; Sara Quin
- Producer: Greg Kurstin

Tegan and Sara singles chronology
| "Closer" (2012) | "I Was a Fool" (2013) | "Goodbye, Goodbye" (2013) |

"I Was a Fool" is a song written and performed by Canadian duo Tegan and Sara for their seventh studio album, Heartthrob (2013). Inspired by Rihanna's singles "Unfaithful" (2006) and "Umbrella" (2007), the song is about a woman who is in a troubled relationship but doing nothing to fix it, making her seem like a fool.

"I Was a Fool" was released in Canada as the second single from the album on April 24, 2013, and peaked at nineteen on Canadian Hot 100 and number one on CBC Radio 2 Top 20, making Tegan and Sara the first twins in history to take the top spot on the chart. In July 2013 "I Was a Fool" was certified Gold in Canada.

== Writing ==
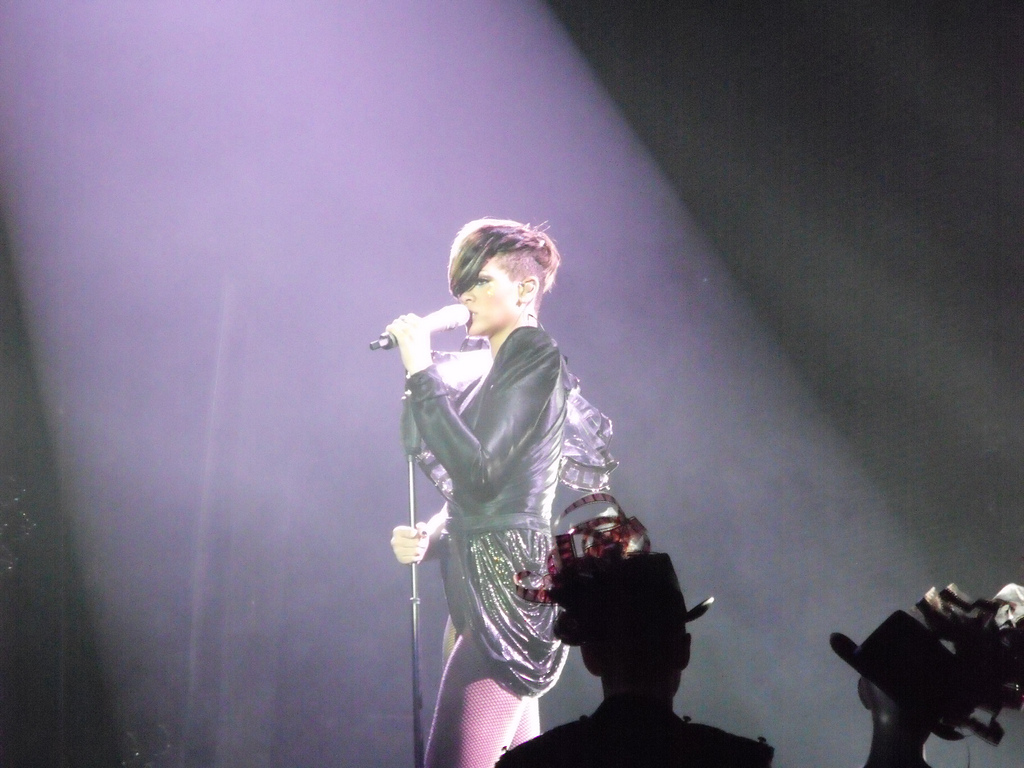
Rihanna on her Last Girl on Earth Tour performing her single "Unfaithful" (2006) which inspired Tegan Quin to write "I Was a Fool."

In November 2011, Tegan and Sara announced that they were writing new material for their seventh studio album, with Tegan saying that "[we] are back in our home studios working away at more songs. We’re really looking forward to making a new record now. Our hope is to be in the studio by early 2012." Tegan composed "I Was a Fool" and wrote the verses and chorus. She began the composition process on a guitar, then moving it to the piano. After listening to Rihanna's single "Unfaithful" (2006), she wanted to create a similar piano riff. She added: "I was deliberately writing a song that I thought someone like Rihanna would want. I also wrote it thinking of her sort of character, someone who is in the media all the time and is probably not the person they're portrayed to be." She also wanted "I Was a Fool" to be "something really sad and kind of fucked, but something that everybody would relate to", in the vein of Rihanna's "Umbrella" (2007).

As Tegan recalls writing the lyrics, "I was in Los Angeles where I have a place with my girlfriend and I was messing around on the guitar. We ran out to do some errands and halfway there, I said to my girlfriend, 'We have to go back.' I had the line 'I did behave' stuck in my head so I went home and recorded that one part. It sat on my computer for about a week then I sat down to continue writing and the rest of the song came together really fast." Sara wrote the bridge, with Tegan explaining in a track-by-track commentary, "There were eight or 16 bars of silence in the song—I can't remember what the number was—that I'd just left for her. She called me and was like, "That is impossible! You need to put a guitar or something in there." So I ended up just using the same chords from the chorus, and she sang overtop of it."

== Production ==
The original demo of "I Was a Fool" consisted only of a piano, an acoustic guitar and synths. Tegan showed it with six producers, one of them who was Greg Kurstin: "he was the only producer out of all of the producers we talked to who was like, 'This is a pop song, a huge pop single ballad.' I was like, "What?" It's awesome that he heard that." This helped the duo decide who they were going to work with on the seventh album, which was titled Heartthrob and recorded between February and May 2012.

The entire production of "I Was a Fool" took place in studios in Los Angeles, California. The original mix of "I Was a Fool" was produced, engineered with Jesse Shatkin, and programmed by Greg Kurstin, who also played keyboards, guitar, bass and piano, at Echo Studio. Billy Bush recorded the drums, which were played by Joey Waronker, at EastWest Studios in Hollywood, with Andrew Ford and Jeremy Miller assisting. The track was mixed by Manny Marroquin at Larrabee Studios with help from Chris Galland and Del Bowers. Finally, Brian Gardner mastered it at Bernie Grundman's studio, also in Hollywood. Sara said about the song in a MTV Hive interview, "I think that it surprised me so much, it was a beautifully-written song of Tegan’s, but something in production and mixing really, to me, sounded like a super-classic song. Almost like I couldn’t believe that it was our song." She also said it was one of their favorite songs from Heartthrob to perform live.

== Composition ==
The three-minute, 24-second "I Was a Fool" is performed in common time at a tempo of 88 beats per minute. Originally composed in the key of B♭ minor, the vocal range spans from A♭_{3} to D♭_{5}. The lyrics of "I Was a Fool" deal with a troubled relationship but doing nothing about it, repeatedly packing her bags without leaving, making her a fool. Annie Zaleski of The A.V. Club and AbsolutePunk critic Drew Beringer opined "I Was a Fool" to be reminiscent of 1980s big-hair-era power ballads by Heart. Consequence of Sound reviewer Sarah H. Grant wrote the song sounded like the Irish band The Corrs, while Spin's Chris Martins described it as a Kate Bush-style ballad. Carolyn Vallejo of Alter the Press! said it sounded like a song from Britney Spears' album ...Baby One More Time.

== Critical reception ==
"I Was a Fool" was given positive reviews by critics and publications. Carl Williott of Idolator described it as "a warm, shimmering song that makes you want to sway", and another writer for the site, Stephen Sears, called it the best song of Heartthrob, writing that "Gwen Stefani’s make-up will run as she cries with jealousy over [the track]". Stereogum journalist Michael Nelson also honored it as the best track of the record, saying that it "sounds like an instant classic, the type of thing that should soundtrack a few million breakups over the next few years and still be prominent in our cultural consciousness three decades from now". Marc Burrows of Drowned in Sound called "I Was a Fool" one of the album's "best moments", along with "Love They Say" and "Now I'm All Messed Up", praising the lyrical content: "the heartbreak comes in waves, but it's never cloying, never over the top. Instead it gives real punch..."

Sarah H. Grant, reviewing Heartthrob for Consequence of Sound, called it "magnificent", and named it an "essential track" of the album, along with "Now I’m All Messed Up" and "Closer". In a review by Pitchfork Media, Laura Snapes used the song as an example to show the LP avoided being anything generic or radio-friendly. Billboard's Jason Lipshutz said, "The lyrics are simple but effective, and Tegan delivers each word with purpose." However, in a positive review of the album by Paste, Dan Weiss called "I Was a Fool" an "early misfire", also noting it as the only track that didn't have "one memorable phrase you won’t be able to excise from your head ‘til at least April." Carolyn Vallejo wrote for Alter the Press! that it fell "short of irony-pop and find themselves stuck in boy band territory", describing it as "sickeningly sweet and a bit too naïve".

== Commercial performance ==
"I Was a Fool" debuted on the Billboard Canadian Hot 100 at number 73, on the issue dated May 18, 2013. By July 20, 2013, it made its peak position of 19. It lasted a total of 22 weeks on the chart. It topped the CBC Radio 2 Top 20, making Tegan and Sara the first twins in history to get a number-one on the chart. By July 2013, it had been certified gold by Music Canada. On the American Billboard Adult Top 40 chart, it landed in the top 40 at number 37, making it the duo's second to appear on the chart after "Closer". It entered at number 143 on the UK Singles Chart, their first single to chart in the country.

== Music video ==
The video was released on April 24, 2013, simultaneously with the single. Tegan is shown singing the song while playing the piano. A woman portrayed by Mae Whitman is shown crying, looking at a painting signed "Sid" as well as turning her phone over after receiving a call from the same person, whose name is revealed to be Sidney. Sara is seen singing on the balcony. The woman is later shown next to smashed up records as she picks up a copy of Heartthrob. She also throws away paintings and burns more of Sidney's possessions, and then proceeds to throw the shards of the broken records from her balcony and smile. Tegan and Sara are then shown on both sides of a glass window as Tegan places her hand to it; Sara disappears and Tegan is then replaced by the woman with her hand to the window, looking out at the sun.

== Live performances ==
The duo premiered "I Was a Fool", along with "Now I'm All Messed Up" and "I'm Not Your Hero", in Vancouver on September 23, 2012. Tegan and Sara appeared on Jimmy Kimmel Live! to perform "I Was a Fool" and "Closer". Kyle McGovern of Spin opined on their performance of "I Was a Fool": "the Canadian pair beautifully blended acoustic guitar strums and their signature harmonies with a lilting piano line, deservedly earning cheers and whistles from the crowd." In February 2013, the duo played the song in February 2013 at the Virgin Red Room. In January 2014, they performed it at Billboard Women in Music 2013.

== Cover and remixes ==
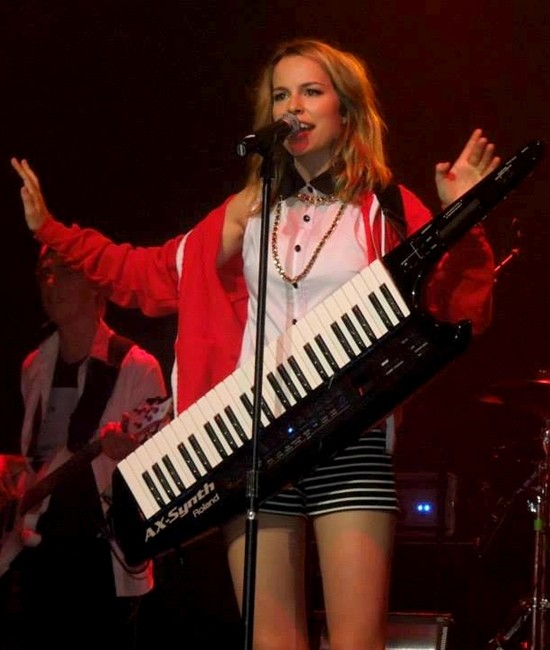
Bridgit Mendler released her cover of "I Was a Fool" in February 2013.

In February 2013, American singer Bridgit Mendler released her cover of "I Was a Fool". The music video was released on February 20, 2013, on Mendler's official YouTube channel and on social networking services. Mendler said she decided to record the song after spending weeks singing it nonstop. In the video she sings on an old stage with great curtains in the background. A guitarist and a keyboardist accompany Mendler. The video is shot in black and white. The cover was positively received. Carl Smith of Sugar Space was positive about Mendler's cover and said he loved it, while also remarking that "Bridgit's given the tune an acoustic twist with a dramatic black and white video to match. There is literally nothing this girl cannot do." Richard Dawson of 5 Things About Pop compared the cover to Mendler's own song "Hold On for Dear Love" and said that the version was lovely. Writers for Teen Beat said they were falling in love with the song, and Mendler was very excited. In May 2013 Mendler performed the song on MTV Live UK.

Matthew Dear premiered his remix of "I Was a Fool" on April 18, 2013. Its consists of an "icy, slow-building ambient bassline and beat" that Michael Nelson of Stereogum said to have made Tegan and Sara's vocals "somehow even more heartbreaking". On May 21, 2014, the duo teamed up with Indaba Music to start a remix contest for the song, with the prize being $750, inclusion on one of their official releases, autographed merchandise products and exposure on their official website. The contest lasted until June 18, 2014, with the winner being the VBND remix. On September 30, 2014, a release consisting of sixteen remixes, including remixes by Matthew Dear and VBND, was issued.

== Credits and personnel ==
The following information adapted from the liner notes of Heartthrob:

Locations

- Recorded and engineered at Echo Studio, Los Angeles, California; drums recorded at EastWest Studios, Hollywood, California
- Mixed at Larrabee Sound Studios, Los Angeles, California
- Mastered at Bernie Grundman Mastering, Hollywood, California.

Personnel

- Songwriting, vocals – Tegan Quin, Sara Quin
- Production, recording, engineering, programming, keyboards, guitar, bass – Greg Kurstin
- Drums – Brian Gardner
- Drums recording – Billy Bush
- Drums recording assistant – Andrew Ford, Jeremy Miller
- Additional engineer – Jesse Shatkin
- Mixing – Manny Marroquin
- Mixing assistant – Chris Galland, Del Bowers
- Mastering – Brian Gardner

== Charts and certifications ==
=== Weekly charts ===
| Chart (2013—14) | Peak position |
|---|---|
| Canada Hot 100 (Billboard) | 19 |
| Canada AC (Billboard) | 9 |
| Canada CHR/Top 40 (Billboard) | 11 |
| Canada Hot AC (Billboard) | 8 |
| UK Singles (OCC) | 143 |
| US Adult Pop Songs (Billboard) | 37 |

=== Year-end charts ===
| Chart (2013) | Peak position |
|---|---|
| Canada (Canadian Hot 100) | 62 |

=== Certifications ===
| Region | Certification | Certified units/sales |
|---|---|---|
| Canada (Music Canada) | Platinum | 80,000^{*} |
^{*} Sales figures based on certification alone.

== Release history ==
| Country | Date | Format | Label |
|---|---|---|---|
| Canada | April 24, 2013 | Digital download | Vapor, Warner Bros. Records |
| Ireland | June 7, 2013 | Digital download | Vapor, Warner Bros. Records |
| United Kingdom | June 7, 2013 | Digital download | Vapor, Warner Bros. Records |
