= Diamonds (The Boxer Rebellion song) =

Single by The Boxer Rebellion
- Released: 26 March 2013
- Recorded: 2012
- Studio: The Sound Factory (Los Angeles, CA)
- Genre: Indie rock
- Length: 4:02
- Label: Absentee Recordings
- Songwriter(s): The Boxer Rebellion
- Producer(s): Billy Bush, The Boxer Rebellion

The Boxer Rebellion singles chronology
"No Harm" (2011)	"Diamonds" (2013)	"Keep Moving" (2013)

"Diamonds" is a song by the British indie rock band The Boxer Rebellion. It was released on 26 March 2013 as the lead single from the band's fourth studio album Promises. The song was not a hit in the band's native United Kingdom but instead gained widespread popularity in the Netherlands, peaking at No. 27 on the Dutch Single Top 100 and No. 30 on the Dutch Top 40 and being voted in second place for the 2013 NPO 3FM Song of the Year award, behind Daft Punk's "Get Lucky".

"Diamonds" remains popular with the Dutch people, being voted into Dutch national radio station NPO Radio 2's annual Top 2000 songs of all time countdown every year since its release. It reached a highest spot of No. 415 in 2022.

== Reception ==
The song has been described as a "serene synth-backed masterpiece" with "shoegaze-meets-Verve guitar soundscapes".

== Commercial performance ==
The chart success of "Diamonds" in the Netherlands came as a surprise to The Boxer Rebellion. Vocalist Nathan Nicholson said, "It’s a really good song and I felt good about it, but at first I didn’t even think it would be a single."

On 31 August 2013, "Diamonds" peaked at No. 30 on the Dutch Top 40. It was the second of the song's three weeks on the chart.

== Charts ==
Chart (2013)	Peak position
Netherlands (Dutch Top 40)	30
Netherlands (Single Top 100)	27

=== Year-end charts ===
Chart (2013)	Position
Netherlands (Dutch Top 40)	188
