= Martin Harley =

Martin Harley may refer to:

- Martin Harley (jockey)
- Martin Harley (musician)
