= Perfect Darkness =

Studio album by Fink
- Released: 13 June 2011
- Length: 46:54
- Label: Ninja Tune
- Producer: Billy Bush, Fink

Fink chronology
Sort of Revolution (2009)	Perfect Darkness (2011)	Fink Meets the Royal Concertgebouw Orchestra (2013)

Professional ratings
Aggregate scores
Source	Rating
Metacritic	69/100
Review scores
Source	Rating
AllMusic	3.5/5 stars
BBC Music	(positive)
The Guardian	4/5 stars
PopMatters	7/10
Under the Radar	5/10

Perfect Darkness is the fifth studio album from British musician Fink, and the fourth to be recorded with his self-titled band. It was released on 13 June 2011 on Ninja Tune.

== Background ==
The album was recorded in the space of 20 days with the intention of capturing a "sense of right nowness" and an "organic sounding recording". The title was chosen because it sounded "really first-tracky" to the band. Behind the title is also a deliberate misinterpretation of the genre of folk, and the album is described by Greenall not to be "a collection of songs about being dumped or ships leaving meadows or whatever it is people think folk's supposed to be nowadays, [it] is not that at all."

The album was produced by Billy Bush (who has worked with artists such as Beck and Garbage) and recorded in Brighton and Los Angeles.

== Critical reception ==
Perfect Darkness was met with "generally favorable" reviews from critics. At Metacritic, which assigns a weighted average rating out of 100 to reviews from mainstream publications, this release received an average score of 69 based on 7 reviews.

In a review for The Guardian, critic reviewer Caroline Sullivan wrote: "His [Fink] fifth album often achieves such loveliness you don't want it to end. An organic warmth prevails on even the most emotionally chaotic songs – delicate fingerpicking and squeaking guitar strings sweeten the scathing "Honesty", while his hungover rasp on "Berlin Sunrise" paints an oddly seductive picture of the new day."

== Track listing ==
All tracks are written by Fin Greenall, Tim Thornton and Guy Whittaker, except where noted.

No.	Title	Writer(s)	Length
1.	"Perfect Darkness"	Greenall; Thornton; Whittaker; Matt Kelly	6:39
2.	"Fear Is like Fire"		3:58
3.	"Yesterday Was Hard on All of Us"		4:55
4.	"Honesty"	Greenall; Thornton; Whittaker; Blair Mackichan	4:33
5.	"Wheels"		3:04
6.	"Warm Shadow"		5:46
7.	"Save It for Somebody Else"	Greenall; Thornton; Whittaker; Michael Flury	3:49
8.	"Who Says"		5:04
9.	"Foot in the Door"		5:03
10.	"Berlin Sunrise"		4:04

== Personnel ==
Fink

- Fin Greenall – vocals, acoustic guitars, sound effects ("FX")
- Guy Whittaker – electric and acoustic bass
- Tim Thornton – drums, electric and acoustic guitars

Additional personnel

- Matt Kelly – string arrangement (on "Perfect Darkness")
- Michael Flury – trombone (on "Save It for Somebody Else")
- Shane Beales – electric keyboard (on "Foot in the Door")

Production

- Billy Bush – producer
- Emily Lazar – mastering
- Joe LaPorta – mastering

== Chart performance ==
Chart performance for Perfect Darkness
Chart (2011)	Peak position
Dutch Albums (Album Top 100)	32
French Albums (SNEP)	149

== Release history ==
Region	Date	Label	Catalogue
United Kingdom	13 June 2011	Ninja Tune	ZENCD170
United States	19 July 2011	Ninja Tune	ZENCD170
