= Union (The Boxer Rebellion album) =

Studio album by The Boxer Rebellion
- Released: January 11, 2009
- Recorded: 2008
- Genre: Indie rock
- Length: 45:15
- Label: Unsigned

The Boxer Rebellion chronology
Exits (2005)	Union (2009)	The Cold Still (2011)

Professional ratings
Review scores
Source	Rating
BBC	positive 2009
Daily Music Guide	link
Drowned In Sound	8/10 link
Q Magazine	4/5
Robert Christgau	link

Union is the second album by The Boxer Rebellion, released worldwide on January 11, 2009, only through iTunes.

The track "Silent Movie" stops at around 4:30 leaving 39 seconds of silence at the end of the track.

The track "Semi-Automatic" featured on a Waterloo episode in 2009.

A physical release has been available since September 14 (UK) and September 11 (ROI). It is available in physical format, exclusively at HMV stores in Canada and has been so since 7 July 2009.

"Evacuate" and "Spitting Fire" were featured on the soundtrack of Going the Distance

== Track listing ==
No.	Title	Length
1.	"Flashing Red Light Means Go"	5:25
2.	"Move On"	4:17
3.	"Evacuate"	3:31
4.	"Soviets"	4:08
5.	"Spitting Fire"	2:52
6.	"Misplaced"	6:13
7.	"The Gospel of Goro Adachi"	3:38
8.	"These Walls Are Thin"	2:32
9.	"Forces"	4:04
10.	"Semi-Automatic"	3:25
11.	"Silent Movie"	5:11
12.	"Broken Glass (US iTunes Bonus Track)"	4:47
13.	"Murder Ballad (US iTunes Bonus Track)"	4:16

== Charts ==
Chart (2009)	Peak position
US Billboard 200	82

== Awards ==
iTunes Alternative Album of (2009)
