= Ocean by Ocean =

Studio album by The Boxer Rebellion
- Released: 29 April 2016
- Recorded: 2016
- Genre: Indie rock
- Length: 39:48
- Label: Amplify
- Producer: Billy Bush

The Boxer Rebellion chronology
Promises (2013)	Ocean by Ocean (2016)	Ghost Alive (2018)

Professional ratings
Review scores
Source	Rating
AllMusic	3.5/5 stars
Belfast Telegraph	8/10 stars
MusicOMH	3/5 stars
Q	4/5 stars

Ocean by Ocean is the fifth album by The Boxer Rebellion, released on 29 April 2016. On 15 February 2016, they showcased two tracks to be taken from the album, "Keep Me Close", followed by "Big Ideas", the latter being the first single off the record.

When talking about "Big Ideas", Nathan Nicholson stated that "it's about meeting someone special but at the wrong time in your life. You feel lucky to have met them but also, because of the bad timing, like you have the very kind of worse luck."

In regards to "Keep Me Close", Nicholson said that it was "about the leap you take when you give yourself over, unwaveringly, to someone else. It's about letting yourself be judged, about being open to change to be closer to someone."

The last track of the album, "Let It Go", is a lament inspired by Nathan reading to his two-year-old son, and reminding himself of his place in the world.

== Track listing ==
No.	Title	Length
1.	"Weapon"	3:15
2.	"Big Ideas"	4:26
3.	"Let's Disappear"	4:17
4.	"Pull Yourself Together"	3:18
5.	"Firework"	3:27
6.	"Keep Me Close"	4:31
7.	"Redemption"	3:57
8.	"The Fog I Was Lost In"	2:55
9.	"You Can Love Me"	5:16
10.	"Let It Go"	4:26
Total length:		39:48

== Charts ==
Chart (2016)	Peak position
Belgian Albums (Ultratop Flanders)	106
Belgian Albums (Ultratop Wallonia)	154
Dutch Albums (Album Top 100)	23
Swiss Albums (Schweizer Hitparade)	58
UK Albums (Official Charts)	89
