= Exits (album) =

Studio album by The Boxer Rebellion
- Released: May 2, 2005
- Recorded: 2005
- Genre: Indie rock, shoegaze
- Label: Mercury

The Boxer Rebellion chronology
Exits (2005)	Union (2009)

Professional ratings
Review scores
Source	Rating
Drowned in Sound	(8/10)
PopMatters	(favorable)

Exits is the debut album by The Boxer Rebellion, released on 2 May 2005 via the Mercury record label. The album combined tracks from the band first EP, "The Boxer Rebellion EP" with a host of new tracks. The song "Watermelon" was used as part of the soundtrack of the game UEFA Euro 2004.

== Track listing ==
No.	Title	Length
1.	"Flight"	4:12
2.	"All You Do Is Talk"	3:02
3.	"We Have This Place Surrounded"	4:26
4.	"Watermelon"	3:26
5.	"The New Heavy"	2:13
6.	"World Without End"	4:15
7.	"Never Knowing How Or Why"	4:10
8.	"Lay Me Down"	5:21
9.	"Cowboys & Engines"	3:35
10.	"The Absentee"	5:51
