= Ghost Alive (album) =

Studio album by The Boxer Rebellion
- Released: 23 March 2018
- Recorded: 2017
- Genre: Indie rock
- Label: Absentee Records
- Producer: Andrew Smith; Adam Cecil Bartlett

The Boxer Rebellion chronology
Ocean by Ocean (2016)	Ghost Alive (2018)

Professional ratings
Review scores
Source	Rating
[sic] Magazine	8/10 stars

Ghost Alive is the sixth studio album by The Boxer Rebellion, released on 23 March 2018. Four singles were released before the album: "What the Fuck", "Goodnight", "Love Yourself" and "Here I Am". "Love Yourself" was released in conjunction with CALM (Campaign Against Living Miserably) to promote wellbeing in mental health.

The album was a joint production between the band's guitarist Andrew Smith and co-producer, Adam 'Cecil' Bartlett.

== Track listing ==
No.	Title	Length
1.	"What the Fuck"
2.	"Rain"
3.	"Love Yourself"
4.	"Fear"
5.	"Here I Am"
6.	"Don't Look Back"
7.	"Lost Cause"
8.	"Don't Ever Stop"
9.	"River"
10.	"Under Control"
11.	"Goodnight"
