= The Cold Still =

Studio album by The Boxer Rebellion
- Released: 7 February 2011
- Genre: Indie rock
- Length: 39:24
- Label: Absentee Recordings
- Producer: Ethan Johns

The Boxer Rebellion chronology
| Union (2009) | The Cold Still (2011) | Promises (2013) |

The Cold Still is the third album from the UK band The Boxer Rebellion; it was released 7 February 2011 in the UK and Europe. The album was released exclusively on iTunes on 1 February 2011. The Cold Still was produced and mixed by Ethan Johns, engineered by Dom Monks, and managed by Embargo Management.

The band performed "Step Out of the Car" on the Late Show with David Letterman on 2 February 2011.

== Reception ==
Stereoboard described the album as the start of "a bright future" for the band, taking inspiration from recent "popular music habits" leading to a diverse range of songs which "are near flawless in their own way".

Professional ratings
Aggregate scores
| Source | Rating |
|---|---|
| AnyDecentMusic? | 6.6 |
| Metacritic | 66 |
Review scores
| Source | Rating |
| The Guardian | 3/5 stars |
| NME | 6/10 |
| Q | 3/5 stars |
| Drowned in Sound | 7/10 |

== Track listing ==
| No. | Title | Length |
|---|---|---|
| 1. | "No Harm" | 4:02 |
| 2. | "Step Out of the Car" | 3:07 |
| 3. | "Locked In the Basement" | 3:42 |
| 4. | "Cause for Alarm" | 3:34 |
| 5. | "Caught by the Light" | 4:51 |
| 6. | "Organ Song" | 3:28 |
| 7. | "Memo" | 3:05 |
| 8. | "Both Sides Are Even" | 5:05 |
| 9. | "The Runner" | 3:39 |
| 10. | "Doubt" | 4:57 |

Bonus Tracks
| No. | Title | Length |
|---|---|---|
| 1. | "325" (previously unreleased) | 3:27 |
| 2. | "Secret Handshake" (previously unreleased) | 3:34 |
| 3. | "Semi Automatic" (alternate version) | 3:54 |
| 4. | "Spitting Fire" (acoustic) | 2:36 |

== Charts ==
Chart performance for The Cold Still
| Chart (2011) | Peak position |
|---|---|
| Dutch Albums (Album Top 100) | 94 |
| Scottish Albums (OCC) | 86 |
| UK Albums (OCC) | 70 |
| US Independent Albums (Billboard) | 24 |
| US Top Alternative Albums (Billboard) | 25 |
