= Hard Believer =

Studio album by Fink
- Released: 14 July 2014
- Recorded: November 2013 in Los Angeles
- Length: 55:00
- Label: R'COUP'D, Ninja Tune
- Producer: Billy Bush

Fink chronology
Fink Meets the Royal Concertgebouw Orchestra (2014)	Hard Believer (2014)	Horizontalism (2015)

Singles from Hard Believer
- 1. "Looking Too Closely" Released: 8 July 2014

Hard Believer is the sixth studio album by English musician Fink. It was released globally by Ninja Tune's imprint R'COUP'D on 14 July 2014.

== Promotion ==
"Looking Too Closely" was released as the lead single to promote the album on 8 July 2014. An official music video for the song, directed by Joffrey Jans and Kai Kurve (Wolf&Lamm Directors Duo), was released onto YouTube on 2 July 2014.

On 7 October 2014, a music video for the second single, "Shakespeare", premiered on YouTube. It was directed by Oliver Murray. An extended play containing remixes of the song will be released digitally on 13 October 2014.

== Track listing ==
All tracks are written by Fin Greenall, Tim Thornton and Guy Whittaker, except where noted.

No.	Title	Writer(s)	Length
1.	"Hard Believer"		5:26
2.	"Green and the Blue"		6:06
3.	"White Flag"		5:04
4.	"Pilgrim"	Fink, B. Mackichan	7:03
5.	"Two Days Later"		5:41
6.	"Shakespeare"		6:19
7.	"Truth Begins"		5:05
8.	"Looking Too Closely"		5:11
9.	"Too Late"		4:16
10.	"Keep Falling"	Fink, Ryan Keen	4:30

== Personnel ==
Fink

- Fin Greenall – lead and harmony vocals, acoustic guitars, keyboards
- Guy Whittaker – electric and acoustic bass, BVs
- Tim Thornton – drums, electric and acoustic guitars, BVs

Additional musicians

- Ruben Hein – piano
- Zac Rae – synths and effects
- Mentrix – backing vocals

== Chart performance ==
Chart (2014)	Peak position
Austrian Albums (Ö3 Austria)	37
Belgian Albums (Ultratop Flanders)	45
Belgian Albums (Ultratop Wallonia)	61
Dutch Albums (Album Top 100)	8
French Albums (SNEP)	72
German Albums (Offizielle Top 100)	25
UK Independent Albums (OCC)	14
USA Heatseekers	30
