= Fink Meets the Royal Concertgebouw Orchestra =

Live album by Fink
- Released: 14 October 2013
- Recorded: 29 April 2012 in Amsterdam
- Genre: Indie rock, folk-pop, blues, classical
- Length: 68:00
- Label: Ninja Tune
- Producer: Rob Kamer, Joost Dellebarre, Fink

Fink chronology
Perfect Darkness (2011)	Fink Meets the Royal Concertgebouw Orchestra (2013)	Hard Believer (2014)

Fink Meets the Royal Concertgebouw Orchestra is the second live album to be released by British band Fink. It was released globally by Ninja Tune on 14 October 2013.

== Background ==
In October 2011 Fink were approached by the Royal Concertgebouw Orchestra of the Netherlands, and Dutch classical music charity Entree, to perform with the orchestra on the traditional Queen's night concert the following year. The concert took place on 29 April 2012 at the Concertgebouw in Amsterdam, and featured classical pieces chosen by the band, along with exclusive arrangements of 6 songs from across Fink's catalogue, scored by Jules Buckley of the Heritage Orchestra. Also performed was Buckley's arrangement of Henry Purcell's "What Power Art Thou", sung by Greenall. Claudia Cuypers of OOR stated that "the orchestra gives [Fink's] songs a new, unexpected power and lightness... in this hall his songs become complete, even though you'd thought they already were."

The orchestra commissioned a special iPad application for the event, on which worldwide viewers could stream audio and video footage of the concert live, in real time: the first time such an application has been used for this purpose in the Netherlands.

The following year, it was decided to release the highlight of the concert as a live album. The recordings, made by Dutch producer Joost Dellebarre, were finessed by Fink and the band's live sound engineer, Rob Kamer.

== Track listing ==
All songs written by Fin Greenall, Tim Thornton and Guy Whittaker except as noted.

1. "Berlin Sunrise" – 6:37
2. "Yesterday Was Hard on All of Us" – 5:37
3. "What Power Art Thou" (Henry Purcell) – 3:14
4. "The Infernal Machine" (Christopher Rouse) – 6:01
5. "Wheels" – 5.06
6. "This Is the Thing" (Fink/B. Mackichan) - 6:04
7. "The Unanswered Question" (Charles Ives) – 6:57
8. "Perfect Darkness" – 8:14
9. "Sort of Revolution" – 9:56

== Personnel ==
- Fin Greenall – Vocals, acoustic guitars, sound effects ("FX")
- Guy Whittaker – Electric and acoustic bass
- Tim Thornton – Drums, electric guitar
- Jules Buckley - Arrangements
- Ivan Meylemans - Conductor
- The Royal Concertgebouw Orchestra

== Chart performance ==
Chart (2013)	Peak position
Belgian Albums (Ultratop Flanders)	159
Belgian Albums (Ultratop Wallonia)	118
Dutch Albums (Album Top 100)	78
