= Distance and Time =

Studio album by Fink
- Released: 1 October 2007
- Length: 36:55
- Label: Ninja Tune; ZEN136

Fink chronology
| 'Biscuits for Breakfast' (2006) | Distance and Time (2007) | 'Sort of Revolution' (2009) |

Professional ratings
Review scores
| Source | Rating |
|---|---|
| Contactmusic.com | 3.5/5 stars |
| MusicOMH | 4/5 stars |
| PopMatters | 8/10 |

Distance and Time is the third album of original studio material from British musician Fink. It was released on 1 October 2007 on the Ninja Tune independent record label.

The track "Make It Good" is a variation on a song that Fink appeared in, "If You Stayed Over", which was released on the album Days to Come by British musician Bonobo.

== Track listing ==
1. "Trouble's What You're In" - 4:27
2. "This Is the Thing" - 4:33
3. "If Only" - 4:22
4. "Blueberry Pancakes" - 4:22
5. "Get Your Share" - 3:18
6. "Under the Same Stars" - 4:10
7. "So Many Roads" - 4:04
8. "Make It Good" - 3:37
9. "Little Blue Mailbox" - 4:10
