= Closer (Tegan and Sara song) =

Single by Tegan and Sara

from the album Heartthrob
- Released: September 25, 2012
- Recorded: 2012
- Genre: Synth-pop; dance-pop
- Length: 3:32
- Label: Vapor; Warner Bros.
- Songwriters: Tegan Quin; Sara Quin; Greg Kurstin
- Producer: Greg Kurstin

Tegan and Sara singles chronology
"Feel It in My Bones" (2010)	"Closer" (2012)	"I Was a Fool" (2013)

Music video
- "Closer" on YouTube

"Closer" is a song by Canadian duo Tegan and Sara from their seventh studio album, Heartthrob (2013). The song was written by Tegan Quin with contributions from Sara Quin and Greg Kurstin. It was released as the lead single from the album in September 2012. Closer won "Single of the Year" at the 2014 Juno Awards. The song has been featured on TV series such as Glee and BoJack Horseman. In 2013, it peaked at number one on Billboard's Hot Dance Club Songs chart. It also became their first single to chart on the Billboard Hot 100. On April 20, 2013, 3600 vinyl copies of Closer Remixed, including four more tracks than the digital EP, were exclusively released for Record Store Day 2013. On July 4, 2013, "Closer" was certified platinum in Canada.

== Lyrics and composition ==
"Closer"
The song introduces a change in dynamics during the chorus.

Tegan spoke of the song during an interview with Rolling Stone magazine in September 2012, saying, "Although I do imagine that this would be an okay song to make out to, all I intended was to write something sweet that reminded the listener of a time before complicated relationships, drama and heartbreak. I was writing about my youth, a time when we got closer by linking arms and walking down our school hallway, or talked all night on the telephone about every thought or experience we'd ever had. It wasn't necessarily even about hooking up or admitting your feelings back then. In fact, that rarely happened. It was the anticipation of something maybe happening that was truly exciting and satisfying. We were perpetually getting closer, yet we rarely got physical with one another, if ever. These relationships existed in a state of sexual and physical ambiguity." Sara encouraged Tegan to be less self-deprecating when writing the song. Tegan was hesitant about writing a straightforward love song and was concerned that using the phrase "get physical" would remind listeners of Australian singer Olivia Newton-John's 1981 single "Physical".

A synth-pop and dance-pop song, "Closer" is set in common time with a tempo of 137 beats per minute. Its rhythm uses a four-to-the-floor beat with a prominent kick drum. The song is written in C major, with a I-IV-V-I circle progression. The song's sections make use of sharply contrasting dynamics, eventually leading to a synthesizer breakdown. The song was influenced by Tegan's "favorite, mid-'90s dance tracks" by Erasure and Ace of Base.

== Critical reception ==
"Closer" placed thirteenth on The Village Voice's 2013 Pazz & Jop singles list. Consequence of Sound called it "genius levels of fun", while Alter the Press! compared the song to "Dancing on My Own" by Robyn. In 2019, Billboard included the song in its list of the "30 Lesbian Love Songs".

== Music video ==
The music video for "Closer" premiered on November 29, 2012, on Tegan and Sara's official YouTube channel. It starts with Tegan and Sara performing karaoke of the song. It then begins to feature different scenes in-between such as various couples doing various party activities as well as putting make-up on one another, playing spin the bottle, and kissing on top of a car. Tegan and Sara are also seen singing on a swing set and jumping on a trampoline.

== In popular culture ==
The song was covered on Glee in the episode "Feud" (2013) by Ryder Lynn (Blake Jenner) and Jake Puckerman (Jacob Artist) with New Directions. It was featured in the pilot of the Freeform original series Young & Hungry and was later featured again in the season 5 episode "Young & Amnesia". The song was also featured in season 12 of Degrassi. The song plays over the final moments and end credits of first-season finale of the Netflix original series BoJack Horseman which aired on 22 August 2014. It was later used in an AT&T commercial in 2015. It was featured in the 2017 Netflix series Friends from College. WWE also used this song in a promo package to highlight former WWE Diva, AJ Lee. In 2019, it was featured in fifth episode of HBO TV series Mrs. Fletcher. In 2020 it was used as the lipsync song in the semi-final episode of the first season of Canada's Drag Race, in a lipsync between Jimbo and Rita Baga.

== Track listing ==
=== Digital download ===
No.	Title	Writer(s)	Length
1.	"Closer"	Tegan Quin, Sara Quin, Greg Kurstin	3:29

=== Digital remix EP ===
(Released March 8, 2013)

No.	Title	Length
1.	"Closer" (Sultan & Ned Shepard Remix)	5:53
2.	"Closer" (Morgan Page's Talk Is Cheap Remix)	3:30
3.	"Closer" (Until the Ribbon Breaks Remix)	4:54
4.	"Closer" (The Knocks Remix)	4:34
5.	"Closer" (Bradley Hale Remix)	4:30
6.	"Closer" (Yeasayer Remix)	3:44

=== Vinyl remix EP ===
(Released exclusively for Record Store Day 2013)

No.	Title	Length
1.	"Closer" (Sultan & Ned Shepard Remix)	5:53
2.	"Closer" (Morgan Page's Talk Is Cheap Remix)	3:30
3.	"Closer" (Until the Ribbon Breaks Remix)	4:54
4.	"Closer" (The Knocks Remix)	4:34
5.	"Closer" (Bradley Hale Remix)	4:30
6.	"Closer" (Yeasayer Remix)	3:44
7.	"Closer" (WALLA Remix)	5:48
8.	"Closer" (Damian Taylor Remix)	3:30
9.	"Closer" (Ted Gowans Remix)	4:07
10.	"Closer" (C-ro & Sofa Remix)	5:52

== Charts ==
=== Weekly charts ===
Chart (2013)	Peak position
Canada Hot 100 (Billboard)	13
Canada AC (Billboard)	7
Canada CHR/Top 40 (Billboard)	11
Canada Hot AC (Billboard)	8
US Billboard Hot 100	90
US Adult Pop Airplay (Billboard)	30
US Dance Club Songs (Billboard)	1
US Hot Rock & Alternative Songs (Billboard)	16
US Pop Airplay (Billboard)	20

=== Year-end charts ===
Chart (2013)	Position
Canada (Canadian Hot 100)	46
US Dance Club Songs (Billboard)	3
US Hot Rock Songs (Billboard)	41

== Certifications ==
Region	Certification	Certified units/sales
Canada (Music Canada)	2× Platinum	160,000^{*}
United States (RIAA)	Gold	500,000^{‡}
^{*} Sales figures based on certification alone.^{‡} Sales+streaming figures based on certification alone.

== Awards and nominations ==
Year	Nominated work	Award	Result
2013	"Closer"	NewNowNext Awards, That's My Jam	Nominated
2013	"Closer"	MuchMusic Video Awards, International Video of the Year by a Canadian	Nominated
2014	"Closer"	Juno Award for Single of the Year	Won

== See also ==
- List of number-one dance singles of 2013 (U.S.)
