= Heartthrob (album) =

Studio album by Tegan and Sara
- Released: January 29, 2013
- Recorded: February – May 2012
- Genre: Synth-pop
- Length: 36:36
- Labels: Vapor; Warner Bros.
- Producers: Greg Kurstin; Mike Elizondo; Justin Meldal-Johnsen; Rob Cavallo

Tegan and Sara chronology
2010 Summer Tour (2010)	Heartthrob (2013)	Love You to Death (2016)

Singles from Heartthrob
- 1. "Closer" Released: September 25, 2012; 2. "I Was a Fool" Released: April 24, 2013; 3. "Goodbye, Goodbye" Released: November 4, 2013

Heartthrob is the seventh studio album by Canadian indie pop duo Tegan and Sara, released on January 29, 2013, on Neil Young's label Vapor Records through Warner Bros. Records. Heartthrob debuted at number 3 on the Billboard 200 chart, selling 49,000 copies in its first week and securing the band's highest chart position to date. It is also the first Tegan and Sara record to chart in New Zealand, the UK and Ireland. On July 4, 2013, Heartthrob was certified Gold in Canada. As of April, Heartthrob has sold 199,000 copies in the United States.

== Background ==
In November 2011, it was revealed that Tegan and Sara were writing new material for their seventh studio album. Tegan said that "(we) are back in our home studios working away at more songs. We’re really looking forward to making a new record now. Our hope is to be in the studio by early 2012." As for what the album will sound like, she stated "…we’re not really sure of that either. We’re meeting with lots of different producers, writing lots of different types of songs, and challenging ourselves to do a lot of really new things within those songs. So hopefully it sounds like T+S but with a whole new element of awesomeness."

== Recording and production ==
Tegan and Sara started recording their seventh studio album on February 20, 2012, and finished recording in May of the same year. While making the record, the band released a series of eight videos documenting the recording process, entitled "Carpool Confessional".

In recording and producing what Rolling Stone called their "most commercial record of their career", Sara Quin said:

"We didn't want to take a small step. We wanted to take a big step. We felt like we closed out our decade with Sainthood. We turned 30 at the end of that album and we had officially been in the industry making music professionally for a decade. This is the time to say, 'What is Tegan and Sara now? What is the future gonna look like for this band?' Some of the answers were really boring....We went through numbers: 'How much do we want to sell? What kind of venues do we want to play? What's our dream size of venue? What countries do we want to play that we haven't played before?' We took all that information and said to ourselves, 'OK, we can't make another record that sounds like what people expect from Tegan and Sara. We can make a record that maybe marries what we've done with the band in the past and then work with a producer who is going to help us embellish and sort of amp up the sound a bit.' I honestly didn't know what to expect from this process. Tegan and I work extensively, independently on our own, writing and creating full demos with bass drums, programming, the whole thing. We're used to keeping a little bit of that, and adding other musicians into it. Within a day or two in the studio with Greg Kurstin, I was like, 'Oh my God, this is amazing.' It was very obvious he wasn't going to take gentle, slow steps towards something. He was just going to throw it out. If we didn't like it, he would throw it out, but he wasn't going to fool around."

Tegan and Sara consider Heartthrob their "pop" album and credit Taylor Swift for inspiring them to cross over to pop music. Other musicians who influenced the album include Katy Perry, Britney Spears, Kate Bush, Tom Petty, Erasure, Ace of Base, Lily Allen, Pink, Madonna, Cyndi Lauper and Rihanna. The record was produced by Greg Kurstin, Justin Meldal-Johnsen and Mike Elizondo. The artwork was designed by the band's longtime art director Emy Storey with photos taken by Lindsey Byrnes.

== Release ==
Heartthrob was released on Neil Young's label Vapor Records through Warner Bros. Records on January 29, 2013. At the time of its release, it was made available on CD, vinyl and as a digital download.

=== Singles ===
The first single, "Closer", was released on September 25, 2012, and reached number 1 on the MuchMusic Top 30 countdown. It is also Tegan and Sara's first single to be certified Platinum in Canada. The music video for "Closer", directed by Isaac Rentz, debuted November 28, 2012 on Spin.com.

The second single released from Heartthrob was "I Was a Fool", on April 24, 2013. The music video for the song was released the same day. The single reached number 1 on CBC Radio 2 Top 20, making Tegan and Sara the first twins in history to take the top spot on the chart. In July 2013 "I Was a Fool" was certified Gold in Canada.

The third single released was "Goodbye, Goodbye". The music video premiered September 17, 2013 on Digital Spy, and the single had an official impact date of November 4, 2013.

=== Other songs ===
"I'm Not Your Hero" was released October 21, 2012 as a promotional single in support of the album. The song charted in Canada (at No. 58) and France (at No. 157) and also impacted the CHR, AC, and Hot AC airplay charts in Canada.

Recorded during the Heartthrob studio sessions, the song "Shudder to Think" was released on the Dallas Buyers Club soundtrack on October 29, 2013.

== Critical reception ==
Professional ratings
Aggregate scores
Source	Rating
AnyDecentMusic?	7.5/10
Metacritic	75/100
Review scores
Source	Rating
AllMusic	4.5/5 stars
The A.V. Club	B+
The Daily Telegraph	4/5 stars
Entertainment Weekly	A−
The Independent	4/5 stars
Los Angeles Times	3/4 stars
NME	8/10
Pitchfork	7.3/10
Rolling Stone	3.5/5 stars
Spin	8/10

Heartthrob received generally positive reviews from music critics upon its release. At Metacritic, which assigns a normalized rating out of 100 to reviews from mainstream critics, the album has received an average score of 75, based on 31 reviews, indicating "generally favorable" feedback.

Jason Lipshutz of Billboard stated: "Most impressively, both Quin sisters maintain their sense of identity amidst the ear candy" and called it "one of the best LPs of this young year." SPIN's Jon Young said: "they've largely ditched the guitars and cast their lot with slick mainstream hooks. Fortunately, they're quite good at it." Writing for Drowned in Sound, Marc Burrows gave the album 9 of 10 rating and also stated that "they may have churned their sound into something new, but their heart and their character is still very much in the right place, and that’s what makes Heartthrob more than just a brilliant pop album, it's unarguably a brilliant Tegan & Sara album and it's very, very close to being perfect".

In a 3 stars and a half review, Nick Catucci of Rolling Stone mentioned that "their seventh album is a veritable bouncy castle of lush, up-to-the-minute indie synth-pop and blown-out radio choruses, less fussy and more whee than anything they've done". Tim Sendra of AllMusic gave the album a 4 and a ½ stars out of 5 rating and stated that "Heartthrob is the sound of Tegan and Sara taking on modern pop music head-on and winning in triumphant style. One would have to go a long way to find a pop record that is as easy to swallow, yet contains such depth". Sarah H. Grant from Consequence of Sound in a 4 star review wrote that "it all circles back to heartthrobs — the fantasies that come and go as abruptly as the closing of a locker door. After all, the canyon between lust and heartbreak is the space all great pop songs occupy. Tegan and Sara have known this for a long time, but with Heartthrob, they fill the canyon with great meaning and melodies — enough to Flashdance from one end to the other and back again". According to Laura Snapes of Pitchfork, "at its best, however, Heartthrob brings the 32-year-old siblings' more adult, romantic touch to a record that roundly avoids turning into any old generic, radio-friendly collection". The album received a 7.3 of 10 rating.

Heartthrob made numerous "Best of 2013" lists. It was ranked number 33 on NME's 50 Best Albums of 2013, number 13 on SPIN's 50 Best Albums of 2013, number 30 on Rolling Stone's 50 Best Albums of 2013, number 7 on Idolator's 2013's Best Albums, number 19 on Stereogum's 50 Best Albums of 2013, and number 43 on MusicOMH's Top 100 Albums of 2013.

It appeared at number 3 on SPIN's Top 20 Pop Albums of 2013, at number 3 on PopMatters's Top 20 Canadian Albums of 2013, at number 24 on PopMatters's list of the 75 Best Albums of 2013, at number 72 on Drowned in Sound Top 100 Albums of 2013, and at number 36 on This Is Fake DIY Readers' Poll 2013.

== Track listing ==
Credits adapted from the liner notes of Heartthrob.

Heartthrob – Standard edition
No.	Title	Writer(s)	Producer(s)	Length
1.	"Closer"	Tegan Quin; Sara Quin; Greg Kurstin	Kurstin	3:29
2.	"Goodbye, Goodbye"	T. Quin; S. Quin	Kurstin	3:26
3.	"I Was a Fool"	T. Quin; S. Quin	Kurstin	3:24
4.	"I'm Not Your Hero"	T. Quin; S. Quin	Kurstin	3:51
5.	"Drove Me Wild"	T. Quin; S. Quin; Ossama Al Sarraf; Ned Shepard	Justin Meldal-Johnsen	3:49
6.	"How Come You Don't Want Me"	T. Quin; S. Quin; Jack Antonoff	Meldal-Johnsen	2:53
7.	"I Couldn't Be Your Friend"	T. Quin; S. Quin	Kurstin	4:19
8.	"Love They Say"	T. Quin; S. Quin	Rob Cavallo; Kurstin	3:35
9.	"Now I'm All Messed Up"	T. Quin; S. Quin	Kurstin	4:08
10.	"Shock to Your System"	T. Quin; S. Quin	Kurstin	3:36
Total length:				36:36

Heartthrob – Japanese deluxe edition bonus tracks
No.	Title	Writer(s)	Producer(s)	Length
11.	"Guilty as Charged"	T. Quin; S. Quin; Mike Elizondo	Elizondo	4:05
12.	"I Run Empty"	T. Quin; S. Quin	Elizondo	4:19
Total length:				45:00

== Personnel ==
- Tegan Quin – vocals (all tracks), guitar (5, 6), keyboards (5–7), acoustic guitar (8)
- Sara Quin – vocals (all tracks), guitar (5, 6), keyboards (2, 5, 6, 10), programming (2, 8, 10)
- Greg Kurstin – producer, keyboards, guitar (1–4, 7–10), mixing (9), programming (1–4, 7, 8, 10), bass (1–4, 7, 9), piano (3, 9)
- Justin Meldal-Johnsen – producer, bass, guitar, keyboards, programming (5, 6)
- Mike Elizondo – producer, keyboards, programming (11, 12), acoustic guitar (12)
- Rob Cavallo – producer, additional guitar, additional percussion (8)
- Manny Marroquin – mixing (1–8, 10, 11)
- Damian Taylor – mixing (12)
- Joey Waronker – drums (1–3, 7–10)
- Victor Indrizzo – drums (5, 6, 11, 12), percussion (5, 6, 12)
- Dorian Crozier – drums, percussion (8)
- Chris Chaney – bass (8)
- Tim Pierce – guitar (8)
- Yonathan Garfias – arrangements (4, 5, 8)
- Jamie Muhoberac – keyboards (8)
- Josh Lopez – guitar (11)
- Dave Palmer – keyboards, piano (11, 12)

== Charts ==
=== Weekly charts ===
Chart (2013)	Peak position
Australian Albums (ARIA)	14
Austrian Albums (Ö3 Austria)	57
Belgian Albums (Ultratop Flanders)	97
Canadian Albums (Billboard)	2
Dutch Albums (Album Top 100)	94
Finnish Albums (Suomen virallinen lista)	30
German Albums (Offizielle Top 100)	70
Irish Albums (IRMA)	24
New Zealand Albums (RMNZ)	27
UK Albums (Official Charts)	38
US Billboard 200	3
US Top Rock Albums (Billboard)	1

=== Year-end charts ===
Chart (2013)	Position
US Top Rock Albums (Billboard)	54

== Awards and nominations ==
Year	Nominated work	Award	Result
2013	"Closer"	NewNowNext Awards, That's My Jam	Nominated
2013	Tegan and Sara	Canadian Radio Music Awards, Best New Group – Dance/Urban/Rhythmic	Won
2013	"Closer"	MuchMusic Video Awards, International Video of the Year by a Canadian	Nominated
2013	Heartthrob	2013 Polaris Music Prize	Nominated
2014	Heartthrob	Juno Award for Pop Album of the Year	Won
2014	"Closer"	Juno Award for Single of the Year	Won
2014	Tegan and Sara	Juno Award for Group of the Year	Won
2014	Tegan and Sara	Juno Award for Songwriter of the Year	Nominated
2014	Heartthrob	GLAAD Media Award for Best Music Artist	Won
