= The Boxer Rebellion (band) =

British band

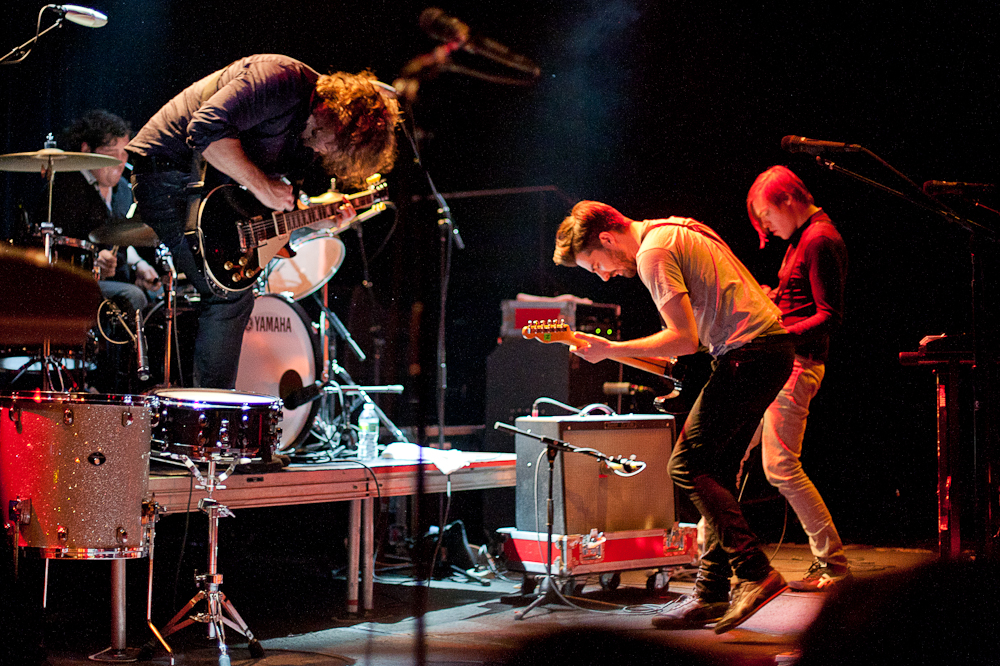
- The Boxer Rebellion at the Music Hall of Williamsburg in Brooklyn, New York

Background information
- Origin: London, United Kingdom
- Genres: Indie rock
- Years active: 2001–present
- Label: Unsigned
- Members: Nathan Nicholson; Andrew Smith; Adam Harrison; Piers Hewitt
- Past members: Todd Howe
- Website: TheBoxerRebellion.com

The Boxer Rebellion is an international indie band formed in London, United Kingdom in 2001, consisting of Tennessee-native Nathan Nicholson (vocals, guitar, keyboards) and Englishmen Andrew Smith (lead guitar), Adam Harrison (bass guitar), and Piers Hewitt (drums). They have so far released an eponymous EP, six studio albums, Exits (2005), Union (2009), The Cold Still (2011), Promises (2013), Ocean by Ocean (2016) and Ghost Alive (2018), as well as a compilation album, B-Sides & Rarities Collection, Vol. 1 & 2 (2012).

== History ==
=== Early years: Inception and self-titled debut EP (2000–2004) ===
In 2000, singer Nathan Nicholson left his hometown of Maryville, Tennessee after the death of his mother and moved to London. Nicholson connected with guitarist Todd Howe through an online posting for musicians that resulted in the creation of a firm friendship and the beginnings of a band.

They soon attracted the attention of drummer Piers Hewitt, who was just graduating from London Music School. Their first project was known as Slippermen. Rob Loflin, a friend of Nicholson's from Tennessee, played bass on early sessions before leaving the band to enter medical school and being replaced by current bassist Adam Harrison, who graduated from London Music School along with Hewitt. As Slippermen they produced a single and an EP, "Lens" and The Traveler respectively, but received limited commercial success.

After re-branding as The Boxer Rebellion and with a massive overhaul in their sound they reworked their ensemble and began building a fan-base.

Last minute support slots at the London Astoria for alt-rock super group A Perfect Circle on 2 October 2003 as well as for Lenny Kravitz at Wembley Arena on 7 July 2004 and The Cooper Temple Clause led to more awareness in the UK music press culminating in widespread features in magazines such as Kerrang!, The Fly and TNT.

As a result of the PlayLouder competition, in June 2003, the band played the Glastonbury New Bands tent ahead of Keane. Shortly after this appearance they were signed by Alan McGee to his ill-fated Poptones record label.

Their first single "Watermelon" was released by Poptones on 4 October 2003. It featured three tracks including "The New Heavy" which appeared on their debut LP Exits. The band then recorded the self-titled The Boxer Rebellion EP which featured the same songs as the "Watermelon" single with two new additions, "Code Red" and "In Pursuit", both songs which would be released as singles later. The EP was produced by Pete Hoffman and mastered by Ray Staff.

Following the release of their debut EP, the band were to embark on a tour with The Killers. However while on tour with The Raveonettes, Nicholson became seriously ill with a burst appendix which required five hours of surgery and months of recovery forcing them to cancel the forthcoming tour.

=== Exits (2005–2008) ===
After three singles following their debut EP, their first full-length album, Exits, was released on 2 May 2005. "Watermelon", seen as the band's signature track, was featured on The Football Factory soundtrack (along with Razorlight, The Libertines, and The Buzzcocks).

The album was produced by Mark Robinson and Chris Sheldon at The Bunker Studios and Jacobs Studios respectively. Exits received glowing reviews from the UK music press with features and reviews in widespread publications including The Sun, Rock Sound, NME and Kerrang!.

Two weeks after the album was released the Poptones label imploded, rendering the band without a label, which they announced at a gig at the ICA on 16 May. They have been unsigned ever since.

The band continued to finance their own gigs and play throughout the UK and mainland Europe. They continued to hold support slots for such artists as the Editors, Lenny Kravitz and Gary Numan, while continuing to write and record.

Their music can be heard on Ewan McGregor and Charley Boorman's second motorcycle adventure, Long Way Down.

The band released their first music video "World Without End" in 2005.

=== Union (2009–2011) ===
The band released their self-funded full-length album, Union on 14 September 2009. It was exclusively released via iTunes with the lead single "Evacuate" (previously a limited edition vinyl release in 2008) hosted as "iTunes single of the week". Within 5 days of its release, Union peaked at No. 4 in the iTunes UK top 100 album chart, and reached No. 2 in the alternative chart (second only to Kings of Leon's late 2008 album Only by the Night). The album was released as a physical copy worldwide in August 2009.

They were the first band to partner with HMV in the UK to manufacture, promote and distribute an independent band's album due to the fact that the band could not afford to make Union available on CD, hence the digital-only release.

The band released the first music video from Union for the song "Broken Glass", originally saved as a bonus track on the album but used as a promotional clip several months before the album was released. The first single from Union was the song "Evacuate", also released with a video.

Their song "Semi-Automatic", from the album Union, was featured in the CW show One Tree Hill on 21 September 2010 ("I Can't See You, But I Know You're There") as well as an episode of Human Target ("A Problem Like Maria") on Fox, 5 January 2011.

Due to the lack of a physical copy in 2009, Union could not enter the official UK chart based on downloads alone despite high charting positions, a situation which achieved media coverage in NME, The Daily Telegraph, and The Evening Standard. This led to the band becoming the first musical act in history to break into the Billboard Album Chart on a digital only release.

The Boxer Rebellion's songs have been featured in a number of television episodes, commercials, and films, including NCIS, Fox's Human Target, USA Network's Royal Pains and WWE Raw, HBO's 24/7, a Buick car advertisement entitled Power, CBS's Ghost Whisperer and Accidentally on Purpose, The CW's One Tree Hill, Spike TV's 2010 Scream Awards, ABC Family's Huge and Lincoln Heights, ABC's television series Grey's Anatomy, the 2004 film The Forgotten, the 2010 independent film Flying Lessons, and the 2010 film Going the Distance. The song "Spitting Fire" was also featured in the 2011 film The Art of Getting By.

The band was featured prominently in the 2010 film Going the Distance. "Evacuate" and "Spitting Fire" were performed from Union, as well as an original song, "If You Run", written specifically for the film's finale. The film was released on 3 September 2010. The song Spitting Fire was also featured in the film The Art of Getting By.

In December 2009, The Boxer Rebellion's album, Union was named the Best Alternative Album of 2009 by the editors of iTunes (US).

In 2010, the band performed at South by Southwest, an annual music, film, and interactive conference and festival held in Austin, Texas. They were awarded Best Men In Black by SPIN magazine's online review.

Piers Hewitt currently performs a weekly radio show on Brentwood radio station Phoenix FM. He also runs his own personal blog dedicated to writing about life on the road and personal thoughts about the music industry.

Renowned British comedian Simon Pegg stated in 2010 in Q Magazine that he is a fan of the band, comparing their sound to "grand indie meets Sigur Ros".

At the conclusion of their 2010 U.S. tour they announced the title and track listing of their new album The Cold Still to be released in February 2011. A lot of the tracks from this coming album were showcased during the 2010 tour of the U.S.

=== The Cold Still (2011–2012) ===
The Boxer Rebellion's third studio album, The Cold Still (2011) was mixed and produced by Ethan Johns at Peter Gabriel's Real World Studios. The Cold Still was released in the U.S. on 1 February 2011 on iTunes and is available on CD worldwide. The album became available on iTunes and in select music outlets in the UK and Europe on 7 February 2011.

The album was also made exclusively available on iTunes for a month after release. The album charted on iTunes at #24 with a peak position of #20, spending 9 days on the US iTunes album chart.

The band made their network television debut on 2 February 2011 on CBS's Late Show with David Letterman, where they performed the single "Step Out of the Car" live. The Boxer's new song "Both Sides are Even" was featured on ABC's Grey's Anatomy on 3 February 2011. "Both Sides are Even" was also featured on the SyFy series Being Human in Season 3 episode 11: "If I Only Had Raw Brain."

Since the release of The Cold Still, the band have had several music placements including two in the videogame industry. "Step Out Of The Car" from The Cold Still was used in 2011's Rocksmith game and original composition "Losing You" was written exclusively for the Batman: Arkham City game soundtrack. Additionally "Caught By The Light" was used in the serial drama Nikita and NCIS in season 8 episode 24 on one of the characters funeral.

Also in 2011 the band released their first full-length live record Live In Tennessee. It was recorded and mixed by Ben McAmis and featured 16 tracks from a single concert.

On 10 October 2011, the band cancelled their North American tour, saying "Due to personal tragedy we have made the difficult but necessary decision to cancel our upcoming appearances in Mexico, Canada, and the United States." They rescheduled an extended North American tour covering the US, Canada, and Mexico for 7 weeks between April and May 2012.

The band played the Austin City Limits festival on the AMD stage on 14 October 2012. This was the final show the band played in 2012.

=== B-Sides and Rarities Collection, Vol. 1 & 2 and Promises (2012–2013) ===
On 7 November 2012, the band announced the release of their two volume B-Sides & Rarities Collection, Vol. 1 & 2, which contains tracks that had been previously recorded, but not included on initial releases of any of the studio albums. Volume one focused on material before and around the band's debut, Exits, and volume two included tracks that were released around and after Union, as well as some rarities that didn't make the cut or were included as bonus tracks for The Cold Still. The two part collection is available for download only on most major online music retailers.

=== Promises (2013) ===
The band finished recording their fourth studio album, Promises, in the late part of February 2013. The music video for the debut single from the album, "Diamonds," was released on 26 March. The single gained widespread airplay on Dutch radio during that summer, giving the band a large new audience in The Netherlands and culminating in a 2nd place spot in NPO 3FM's 'Song of the year' awards that year, pipped at the post by Daft Punk's 'Get Lucky'. The success of the song also lead to a TV appearance on 'The Tonight Show with Jay Leno' in The US. Songs from the album were widely used in TV shows including 'Grey's Anatomy', 'The Originals' and 'The Vampire Diaries', alongside widespread usage in sports coverage such as MLB, Nascar and The NFL. The album released on 14 May, with a summer tour covering select areas of North America, and a single date in London, UK in October.

=== Ocean by Ocean (2016) ===
On 7 February 2016, the band announced their fifth studio album, Ocean by Ocean, which was released on 29 April 2016. On 15 February 2015, they released the first single "Keep Me Close", followed by "Big Ideas" on 2 March and "Weapon" on 15 April.

At the end of October 2016, the band released the Waves & Waves EP which saw four of the tracks from Ocean by Ocean re-recorded in alternative versions. The four tracks were "Big Ideas", "Keep Me Close", "Pull Yourself Together" (featuring Hey Anna) and "The Fog I Was Lost In".

=== Ghost Alive (2018) ===
In October 2017, the band issued a new single "What the Fuck", to be featured on a sixth studio album called Ghost Alive, to be released on 23 March 2018.

On 19 November 2017, in support of CALM (The Campaign Against Living Miserably) and to mark the upcoming International Men's Day, the band unveiled a poignant video for the new single 'Love Yourself' lifted from their upcoming album. According to Nathan Nicholson the track came to be after facing his own demons in the wake of the loss of his mother and unborn child. Subsequently, the single 'Here I am' was released on 16 February 2018 ahead of a UK tour.

On Monday 9 April 2018, Nathan Nicholson was interviewed by the Independent about recording the band's new album 'Ghost Alive', its themes centred on issues of mental health and their legacy as one of the many British indie bands that emerged in the early noughties.

== Musical styles and influences ==
The Boxer Rebellion emerged at the tail end of the Oasis and Radiohead-dominated era of British music as part of a newer scene of British bands adding an element of post-rock to the rock charts. The band's first single "Watermelon" was greeted with great enthusiasm by the British music press with The Fly magazine describing the band as "the current Bright Young Things of Britrock, sounding like a bubbling mixture of The Cooper Temple Clause with the added bonus of Verve-esque melodies and Music-esque madness". Kerrang! in 2009 recommended the band for fans of Muse and Biffy Clyro, the latter of whom The Boxer Rebellion supported in the UK during 2004. Q magazine described their Union album as "redolent of The Bends-era Radiohead". Stereoboard stated the band as "clearly taking influence from the recent success of bands such as The National and British Sea Power".

Todd Howe, the band's former lead guitarist is known to be an avid Frank Zappa fan, owning over 36 of his records.

Todd Howe announced he was leaving the band on Facebook, 29 April 2014. According to Nathan Nicholson, the split was entirely amicable – Todd Howe had married someone who lives and works in Arizona, so it became too hard to work together.

On 20 October 2020, it was announced that Nathan Nicholson and Adam Harrison were forming a new band called Big Ideas with a preview of new music to be released on 29 October 2020

== Appearances in media ==
=== TV ===
- Lethal Weapon (TV Series) – "Here I Am"
- MLB on Fox Sports 1 – "Keep Moving"
- Trigger Happy TV – "Weapon", "Big Ideas"
- US Open on Fox – "Keep Moving"
- Bull (2016 TV series) – "A Redemption"
- The Royals – "You Can Love Me"
- Kentucky Derby Promo – "Firework"
- Beauty & the Beast – "Keep Moving"
- NCIS – "Caught by the Light"
- Human Target – "Semi-Automatic"
- Grey's Anatomy – "Both Sides Are Even", "New York", "You Belong to Me", "Dream"
- Royal Pains – "Doubt"
- One Tree Hill – "Both Sides Are Even", "Semi-Automatic"
- 24/7 (HBO) – "Both Sides Are Even"
- Ghost Whisperer – "Spitting Fire"
- Huge – "Soviets"
- CSI: New York – "Locked in the Basement"
- A Gifted Man – "Both Sides Are Even"
- Nikita – "Caught by the Light"
- The Vampire Diaries – "Code Red", "Dream"
- The Originals (TV series) – "Promises"
- The Forgotten – "Silent Movie"
- Accidentally on Purpose – "Soviets"
- Lincoln Heights – "Soviets"
- Being Human (North American TV series) – "Both Sides Are Even"
- Long Way Down – "Semi-Automatic"
- Shameless – "Both Sides Are Even", "Caught by the Light", "Code Red"
- Legit (2013 TV series) – "Keep Moving"
- Forever – "New York"
- Shadowhunters− "Here I Am"

=== Film ===
- Going the Distance – "If You Run", "Spitting Fire", "Evacuate'"
- The Art of Getting By – "Spitting Fire"
- Flying Lessons – "Flashing Red Light Means Go"
- The Dead Outside – "Evacuate"
- Room – "Dream"
- The Accountant 2 – "Safe House"

=== Video games ===
- Rocksmith – "Step Out of the Car"
- FIFA Football 2004 – "Watermelon"

=== Commercials ===
- Buick "Power" commercial – "Spitting Fire"
- Draper – "Big Ideas"
- National Geographic brand Anthem – "Keep Moving"

=== Soundtrack albums ===
- Batman: Arkham City – "Losing You"
- Going the Distance – "If You Run", "Spitting Fire"
- Long Way Down – "The Gospel of Goro Adachi"

== Discography ==
=== Studio albums ===
List of studio albums, with selected chart positions and certifications
Title	Album details	Peak chart positions								
Title	Album details	UK	UK Indie	BEL (FL)	BEL (WA)	NL	SCO	SWI	US	US Indie
Exits	Released: 5 May 2005; Label: Mercury; Formats: CD, digital download	—	—	—	—	—	—	—	—	—
Union	Released: 13 January 2009; Label: Independent; Format: CD	144	19	—	—	—	—	—	82	5
The Cold Still	Released: 8 February 2011; Label: Absentee; Formats: CD, digital download	70	6	—	—	94	86	—	— (Note: The Cold Still did not enter the Billboard 200 chart, but peaked at number 164 on the Current Album Sales chart.)	24
Promises	Released: 14 May 2013; Label: Absentee; Formats: CD, digital download, vinyl	68	16	159	197	13	73	—	69	14
Ocean by Ocean	Released: 29 April 2016; Label: Amplify; Formats: CD, digital download, vinyl	89	11	106	154	23	71	58	— (Note: Ocean by Ocean did not enter the Billboard 200 chart, but peaked at number 90 on the Current Album Sales chart.)	20
Ghost Alive	Released: 23 March 2018; Label: Absentee Recordings; Formats: CD, digital download, vinyl	—	—	—	—	—	—	—	—	—
The Second I'm Asleep	Released: 27 March 2026; Label: Absentee Recordings; Formats: CD,digital download,vinyl,streaming	—	—	—	—	—	—	—	—	—
"—" denotes a release that did not chart or was not issued in that region.

=== Live albums ===
- 2009: iTunes Live from London (iTunes exclusive)
- 2011: Live in Tennessee
- 2014: Live at the Forum

=== Compilations ===
- 2012: B-Sides & Rarities Collection, Vol. 1 & 2 (download albums)

=== EPs ===
- 2003: The Boxer Rebellion EP (500 only of which 100 signed by the band in gold)
- 2004: "Work in Progress" (promo)

=== Singles ===
Title	Year	Peak chart positions					Album
Title	Year	UK	UK Indie	NL	SCO	US Rock	Album
"Watermelon"	2003	187	—	—	—	—	Exits
"In Pursuit"	2004	57	7	—	90	—	Non-album singles
"Code Red"	2004	61	—	—	80	—	Non-album singles
"All You Do Is Talk"	2007	—	—	—	—	—	Exits
"World Without End"	2007	—	—	—	—	—	Exits
"Evacuate"	2008	—	—	—	—	—	Union
"Flashing Red Light Means Go"	2009	—	—	—	—	—	Union
"Semi-Automatic"	2009	—	—	—	—	—	Union
"Step Out of the Car"	2011	— (Note: "Step Out of the Car" did not enter the UK Singles Chart, but peaked at number 37 on the UK Physical Singles Chart Top 100.)	—	—	—	—	The Cold Still
"The Runner"	2011	—	—	—	—	—	The Cold Still
"No Harm"	2011	—	—	—	—	—	The Cold Still
"Diamonds"	2013	—	—	27	—	—	Promises
"Keep Moving"	2013	—	—	—	—	—	Promises
"Promises"	2014	—	—	—	—	—	Promises
"Always"	2014	—	—	—	—	—	Promises
"Big Ideas"	2016	—	—	—	—	42	Ocean by Ocean
"Weapon"	2016	—	—	—	—	—	Ocean by Ocean
"Let's Disappear"	2016	—	—	—	—	—	Ocean by Ocean
"WTF"	2017	—	—	—	—	—	Ghost Alive
"Love Yourself"	2017	—	—	—	—	—	Ghost Alive
"Here I Am"	2018	—	—	—	—	—	Ghost Alive
"Open Arms"	2024	— (Note: "Open Arms" did not enter the UK Singles Chart, but peaked at number 76 on the UK Single Sales Chart Top 100.)	—	—	—	—	Non-album single
"—" denotes single that did not chart or was not released
