= Fink (singer) =

English musician (born 1972)

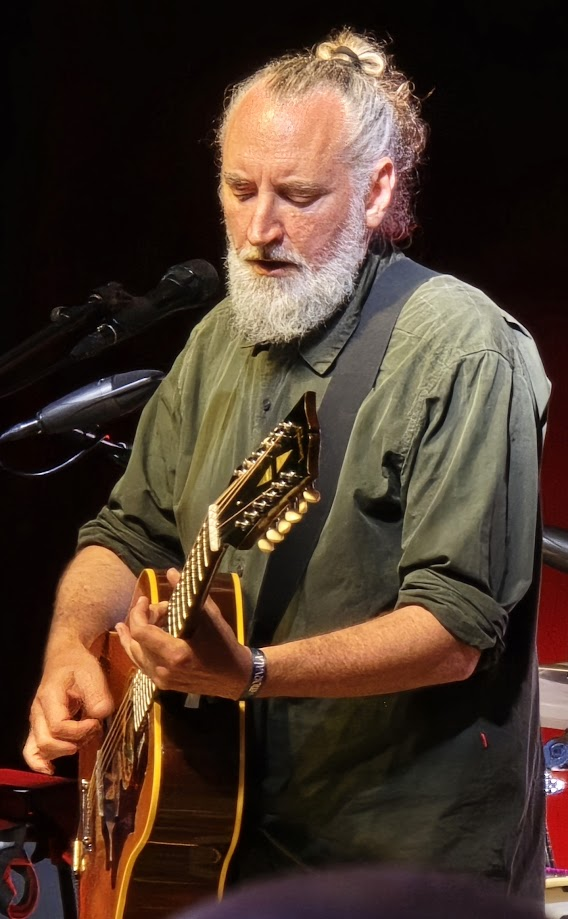
- Greenall in 2026

Background information
- Also known as: Fin Greenall
- Born: 27 November 1972 (age 53); St Ives, Cornwall, England
- Genres: Folk; indie rock; blues; trip hop
- Occupations: Songwriter; guitarist; singer; disc jockey; music producer
- Years active: 1993–present
- Labels: R'COUP'D; Ninja Tune
- Members: Fin Greenall; Tim Thornton; Guy Whittaker
- Website: finkmusic.net

Fin Greenall, known professionally as Fink, is an English singer, songwriter, guitarist, producer and disc jockey born in Cornwall and currently based in Berlin and London. From 1997 to 2003, he focused on electronic music and DJ'd internationally, releasing in 2000 his debut album Fresh Produce on Ninja Tune. Since the 2006 release of his album Biscuits for Breakfast, the name Fink has also referred to the recording and touring trio fronted by Greenall himself, completed by Guy Whittaker (bass) and Tim Thornton (drums/guitar).

Greenall has written in collaboration with John Legend, Banks, Ximena Sarinana and Professor Green. With Amy Winehouse, he co-wrote the song "Half Time", which appears on Winehouse's posthumous collection Lioness: Hidden Treasures. In 2012, Fink collaborated and performed with the Royal Concertgebouw Orchestra in Amsterdam, resulting in the live album Fink Meets The Royal Concertgebouw Orchestra. Fink's first label was Ninja Tune, moving in 2014 to his own label, R'COUP'D Records, originally a subsidiary of Ninja Tune and now independent.

== Early life ==
Greenall was born 1972 in Cornwall and grew up in Bristol. Greenall recalls "the one thing of his dad's that he wasn't allowed to touch was the old Martin acoustic guitar." Greenall said, "It was his one possession where he said, 'everything in this house is owned by everybody – apart from that.'" Their presence influenced his future in music. "The great thing about growing up in a house where music is a big factor... was the fact that music being part of your life was a perfectly natural thing." During his teenage years, he accumulated eclectic musical interests, gravitating towards The Cure, The Smiths, The Orb, African music, and Japanese hardcore, before discovering electronic and dance music at University of Leeds.

He earned his degree in History and English at University of Leeds and, with student friends, formed the short-lived dance act EVA, who signed to Kikin' Records in 1993. For the remainder of the 1990s and much of the early 2000s, Greenall worked in the music industry for various London-based labels, including Virgin's Source, Def Jam, and Sony. Simultaneously, he pursued a musical career, remixing and producing for various artists, including Ryuichi Sakamoto and Elbow but also as a DJ.

== Career ==
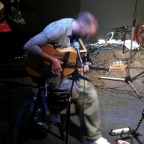
Greenall performing in Lausanne, Switzerland

Fink's serious recording career began with Ninja Tune subsidiary N-Tone's release of his debut single "Fink Funk" in 1997, followed by the album Fresh Produce in 2000, which was well received. In the following years, he continued to produce other artists, including Martin Taylor, Michael Pitt and Robert Belfour.

Towards the mid-2000s, Greenall developed a disillusionment with dance music and being a DJ and began to turn to more traditional musical avenues. It was this feeling which resulted in 2006's Biscuits for Breakfast, the first album to feature current collaborators Guy Whittaker and Tim Thornton, with whom Greenall had been friends for a few years but had not yet worked. Built around his bluesy voice, finger-picking acoustic guitar and the stripped-back live rhythm section, the self-produced Biscuits boasted a fledgling pop sensibility while retaining some of the signature Ninja Tune sonic hallmarks. He became the label's first singer/songwriter. The album, along with single "Pretty Little Thing", helped define his style and began to bring his name to a wider, and higher-profile, audience, notably Zero 7, who invited Fink to support them on their UK tour.

=== 2007–2010: Distance and Time and Sort of Revolution ===
During the extensive European and American tours which accompanied Biscuits, Greenall began to write songs for the follow-up album. For this, he collaborated both with his bandmates and third parties, teaming up with Blair MacKichan for the writing of the "This is the Thing", and producer Andy Barlow of Lamb. The eventual album, Distance and Time, was released through Ninja Tune in October 2007, and was immediately recognised as a more robust, band-led affair than its predecessor, with musicOMH stating that "the soft-spoken confessionals of their debut are more accomplished this time, taken to the big city and returned home just as wounded, but more worldly-unwise than their little brothers." The tour following Distance's release took Fink to new territories such as Germany, South Africa and Canada, and also saw the band supporting Italian rock band Negramaro at their climactic San Siro stadium show in Milan.

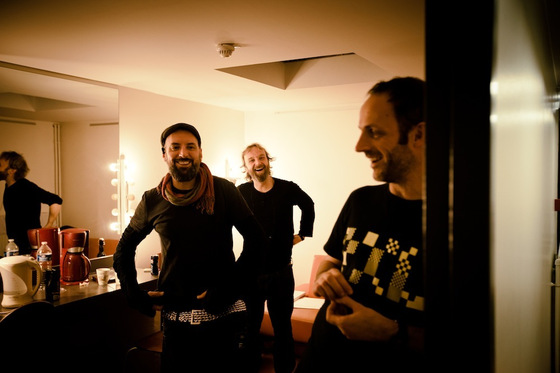
The Fink trio (L-R Greenall, Whittaker, Thornton)

One of Distance and Time's tracks "If Only" attracted the attention of American singer-songwriter John Legend, with whom Greenall collaborated on tracks for his album Evolver. The hit single "Green Light", featuring André 3000, won a BMI Award for Greenall in 2010. Legend reciprocated by collaborating on songs for Fink's 2009 album Sort of Revolution. Greenall decided to return to production duties for this set, resulting in a more experimental approach that the BBC's Keira Burgess described as a "sublime study in the art of pleasing yourself without drowning in indulgence". Radiohead became a fan of Fink's work at this time, posting the song "Q&A" on their website playlist. BBC Radio One DJ Gilles Peterson, who commissioned a live session for his late-night show, recorded at the BBC's Maida Vale Studios.

Sort of Revolution's accompanying tour was more extensive than previous outings, taking the band to China and Australia for the first time. In the latter country, Fink headlined a three-night stand at the Sydney Festival. It was during this trip that Greenall met Professor Green, and the pair decided on a collaboration for Green's upcoming debut album, 2010's Alive Till I'm Dead. The track, "Closing The Door", features a rap from Green, a sung vocal from Greenall and instrumental backing from Thornton and Whittaker. The experience led Green to request a further partnership, this time for his 2011 release At Your Inconvenience, another full-band collaboration on "Spinning Out", a reworking of The Pixies 1987 classic "Where Is My Mind".

On the American trip for the Revolution album, Fink was invited to perform at a tribute concert for R.E.M. at New York City's Carnegie Hall. Greenall performed a solo rendition of "The Apologist" from the band's 1998 album Up.

=== 2011–2013: Perfect Darkness and "Queen's Night" concert with Royal Concertgebouw Orchestra ===
Songwriting sessions for Fink's fifth full-length album began in early 2010. For this album, Greenall's process was very different. Greenall recounted in an interview that "after all the live shows and all the fun we'd had on stage, we jammed first as a band. No vocals, just these massive soundscapes. We did about 30 of them. Then a couple of weeks later, go through them, pick the best bits. "Perfect Darkness", the song, was one riff, one bass line and one moment of a 20-minute jam." The band travelled to Los Angeles to record the subsequent album with producer Billy Bush.

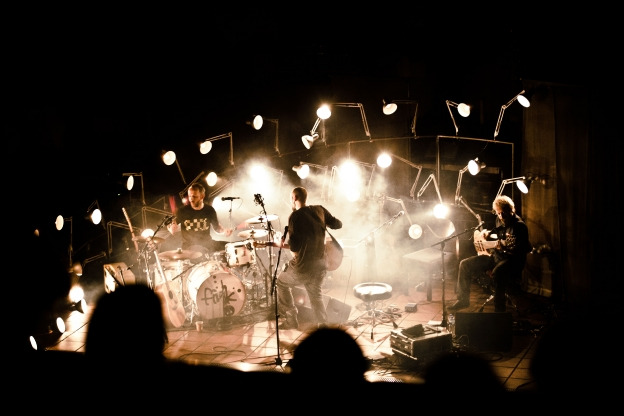
Fink onstage at Paradiso, Amsterdam, 2011, with 59 Productions' stage set

On 27 March 2011, the track "Perfect Darkness" was made available for free download via the band's website, followed by the album release on 13 June. The critical reception the album received was positive, with The Guardian's Caroline Sullivan describing it as a "delight... achieves such loveliness you don't want it to end", and the BBC's Ian Wade calling the set "a writhing, surprisingly meaty addition to the over-crowded singer-songwriter genre."

To support the album, the band took the decision to enlarge their stage show considerably, not with additional musicians but with a visual production, designed by 59 Productions, famed for working with Jónsi and on the stage show War Horse. Says Greenall: "They’ve been part of the album big time since the moment we started to write it because we knew that they would be involved with the stage show. They've custom engineered the show that doesn’t overpower the music but just kind of embraces you and it emphasises some of the atmospherics in the music." The live show involved a frame to which 48 Anglepoise lamps were screwed, and eight gauze visual screens. The subsequent tour took Fink on 49 dates in fourteen countries throughout autumn 2011, including London's Union Chapel, where The Times' David Sinclair found the show "a perfect storm of profound, brooding emotion."

In 2012, Fink featured alongside Professor Green on "Read All About It, Pt. II", a new version of Green's hit single "Read All About It" featuring Emeli Sandé. The song was recorded for Q magazine. In November 2012, Fink played their largest UK headline show to date, at London's Shepherd's Bush Empire.

In October 2011 Fink were approached by the Royal Concertgebouw Orchestra of the Netherlands, and Dutch classical music charity Entree, to perform with the orchestra on the traditional Queen's night concert the following year. The concert took place on 29 April 2012 at the Concertgebouw in Amsterdam, and featured classical pieces chosen by the band, along with exclusive arrangements of 6 songs from across Fink's catalogue, scored by Jules Buckley of the Heritage Orchestra. Also performed was Buckley's arrangement of Henry Purcell's "What Power Art Thou", sung by Greenall. Claudia Cuypers of OOR stated that "the orchestra gives [Fink's] songs a new, unexpected power and lightness... in this hall his songs become complete, even though you'd thought they already were."

The orchestra commissioned a special iPad application for the event, on which worldwide viewers could stream audio and video footage of the concert live, in real time: the first time such an application has been used for this purpose in the Netherlands.

On 14 October 2013, a live album of the concert was released through Ninja, entitled Fink Meets The Royal Concertgebouw Orchestra.

=== 2014–2016: Hard Believer and Horizontalism ===
On 19 March 2014, Fink released the first song from their new album, "Hard Believer". The song was made available for free download from the band's website, and streaming on SoundCloud. A week later, Fink confirmed that a new album entitled Hard Believer would be released in summer 2014.

Hard Believer was released on 14 July 2014 through a new Ninja Tune imprint R'COUP'D. Like its predecessor, it was produced by Billy Bush. Buoyed by the radio success of the single "Looking Too Closely", the album charted in several territories, including a top 10 appearance in the Netherlands (number 8), number 25 in Germany, and at Top 30 slot on the Billboard Heatseekers album chart in the US.

Following the success of the Hard Believer album Greenall made an alternative version of the album using some more of the atmospheric sounds from the record, which emerged in May 2015 as Horizontalism.

=== 2017–2019: Fink's Sunday Night Blues Club, Vol. 1, Resurgam and Bloom Innocent ===
On 10 March 2017, Fink released a more blues-oriented album called Fink's Sunday Night Blues Club, Vol. 1. Considered a side project, "after the pressure of Hard Believer, and the studio time of Horizontalism, to do something raw, rough, and live, a record that just was, for its own sake", it was recorded in Fink's apartment in Berlin. The album was produced and mixed by Fink and Flood. Each track was recorded "fast, live, using one vintage mic, and one vintage amp." The track "Cold Feet" was later used in the television show Better Call Saul.

On 15 September 2017, again through R'COUP'D, Fink released the album Resurgam, with prior releases of the singles "Cracks Appear" on 31 July and "Not Everything Was Better in the Past" on 29 August. The album was recorded entirely at the Assault & Battery studios in London, with producer Flood. Fink subsequently announced an autumn tour with more than sixty dates across nineteen countries, with the band including two drummers for their live performances.

Fink's eighth studio album Bloom Innocent was released in October 2019. It was once again produced by Flood.

=== 2020-present: Beauty in Your Wake and The City Is Coming To Erase It All ===
Announced on his own website, Fink's album Beauty in Your Wake was released on 5 July 2024.

In March 2026, Fink released the single "Memorise Your Senses" as the lead single to the June 2026 album The City Is Coming To Erase It All.

=== Other collaborations ===
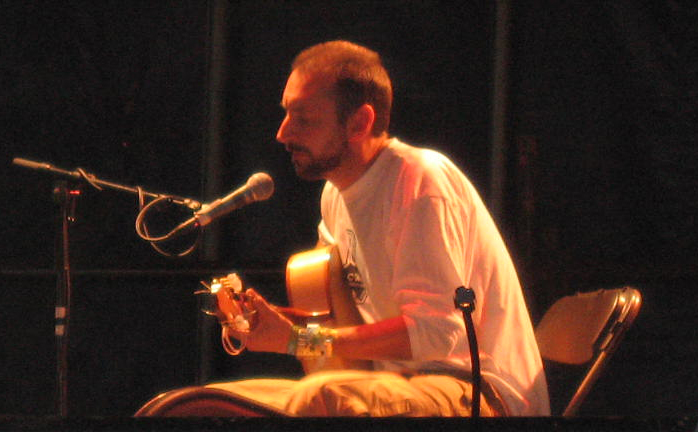
Fink in 2006

In 2005, Greenall sings the track "Dead Man" on Nitin Sawhney's album Philtre.

Fink appeared on Bonobo's 2006 album Days to Come for the track "If You Stayed Over" (an adaptation of which became "Make It Good", from Fink's own Distance And Time album).

In 2008, Fink appeared on the John Legend album Evolver, having co-written "Greenlight" and co-produced and co-written "Set Me Free".

Fink also continues to operate within the dance music scene under the name Sideshow on Will Saul's Simple Records, with seven releases to his name. An album, Admit One, was released in January 2009. He also continues to record under various guises, currently Quantum Entanglement with Berlin-based DJ Lee Jones.

In November 2011, he has spoken of his early sessions with Amy Winehouse, saying, "the songs were there, her voice was there, and she was genuinely who she was, and that was obvious even at 17. She was a no compromise, full-on artist. It was just awesome to work with her."

In 2012, Fink appeared on the Season 2 pilot episode of an Indian musical show called The Dewarists along with composer Salim–Sulaiman from India and Shafqat Amanat Ali from Pakistan.

In 2013 Fink collaborated with John Legend on the soundtrack album to 12 Years a Slave, having co-written and performed "Move".

== Discography ==
=== Studio albums ===
Title	Album details	Peak chart positions							
Title	Album details	UK Indie	UK Indie Break.	AUT	BEL (Fl)	FRA	GER	NED	SWI
Fresh Produce	Released: 13 June 2000; Label: Ntone/Ninja Tune (NTONE CD/LP #39)	—	—	—	—	—	—	—	—
Biscuits for Breakfast	Released: 24 April 2006; Label: Ninja Tune (ZEN104)	—	—	—	—	—	—	—	—
Distance and Time	Released: 1 October 2007; Label: Ninja Tune (ZEN136)	—	—	—	—	139	—	—	—
Sort of Revolution	Released: 25 May 2009; Label: Ninja Tune (ZEN146)	—	—	—	—	136	—	60	—
Perfect Darkness	Released: 13 June 2011; Label: Ninja Tune (ZENCD170)	—	6	—	—	149	—	32	—
Hard Believer	Released: 14 July 2014; Label: R'COUP'D, Ninja Tune	14	3	37	45	72	25	8	21
Horizontalism	Released: 18 May 2015; Label: R'COUP'D, Ninja Tune	—	—	—	123	—	—	84	—
Fink's Sunday Night Blues Club, Vol. 1	Released: 10 March 2017; Label: R'COUP'D, Ninja Tune	—	—	—	53	—	—	53	59
Resurgam	Released: 15 September 2017; Label: R'COUP'D, Ninja Tune	—	—	47	72	171	84	39	39
Bloom Innocent	Released: 25 October 2019; Label: R'COUP'D, Ninja Tune	—	—	—	—	—	—	—	83
Beauty in Your Wake	Released: 5 July 2024; Label: R'COUP'D, Republic of Music	2	1	—	–	—	20	–	–
"—" denotes a recording that did not chart or was not released in that territory.

2026 * The City Is Coming To Erase It All

=== Live albums ===
List of albums, with selected chart positions
Title	Album details	Peak chart positions		
Title	Album details	UK	BEL (Vl)	NED
Wheels Turn Beneath My Feet	Released: 18 September 2012; Label: Ninja Tune	—	156	—
Fink Meets the Royal Concertgebouw Orchestra	Released: 14 October 2013; Label: Ninja Tune	—	159	78
"—" denotes a recording that did not chart or was not released in that territory.

=== Extended plays ===
Title	Album details
Fink Funk	Released: 1 July 1997; Label: Ninja Tune

=== Singles ===
Title	Year	Peak chart positions			Album
Title	Year	UK Indie	UK Indie Break.	NED	Album
"Pretty Little Thing"	2006	—	—	—	Biscuits for Breakfast
"So Long"	2006	—	—	—	Biscuits for Breakfast
"This Is the Thing"	2007	34	18	—	Distance and Time
"Yesterday Was Hard on All of Us"	2011	—	—	—	Perfect Darkness
"Perfect Darkness"	2011	—	—	—	Perfect Darkness
"Looking Too Closely"	2014	—	—	89	Hard Believer
"Shakespeare"	2014	—	—	—	Hard Believer
"Cracks Appear"	2017	—	—	—	Resurgam
"Not Everything Was Better in the Past"	2017	—	—	—	Resurgam
