= Promises (The Boxer Rebellion album) =

Studio album by The Boxer Rebellion band

Studio album by The Boxer Rebellion
- Released: 13 May 2013
- Recorded: 2012
- Genre: Indie rock
- Label: Absentee Recordings

The Boxer Rebellion chronology
B-Sides & Rarities Collection, Vol. 1 & 2 (download albums) (2012)	Promises (2013)	Ocean by Ocean (2016)

Singles from Promises
- 1. "Diamonds" Released: 26 March 2013

Professional ratings
Review scores
Source	Rating
Allmusic	4.5/5 stars
Filter	86%
The Fire Note	4.5/5 stars
Music OMH	3/4 stars

Promises is the fourth studio album by The Boxer Rebellion, released worldwide on 13 May 2013. Four singles were released from the album; "Diamonds", "Promises", "Keep Moving" and "Always".

"Promises" featured in the Google Grad's campaign with "Keep Moving" and "New York" featuring in the TV series' Legit and Forever respectively.

"Always" was re-recorded acoustically to celebrate new guitarist Andrew Smith coming on board to replace Todd Howe and one other song, "I Fell in Love", left over from the sessions (but not included on the album) was released as a free download.

The album peaked at number 69 on the official Billboard 200 chart in 2013.

== Track listing ==
No.	Title	Length
1.	"Diamonds"	4:02
2.	"Fragile"	4:27
3.	"Always"	3:35
4.	"Take Me Back"	3:36
5.	"Low"	3:11
6.	"Keep Moving"	4:02
7.	"New York"	2:52
8.	"Safe House"	4:55
9.	"You Belong to Me"	3:34
10.	"Dream"	5:09
11.	"Promises"	4:36
