= Biscuits for Breakfast =

Studio album by Fink
- Released: 24 April 2006
- Recorded: 2005 in Brighton and London, UK
- Genre: Indie rock, folk-pop, blues
- Length: 38:02
- Label: Ninja Tune ZEN104
- Producer: Fin Greenall, Dean James, Ben Thackeray

Fink chronology
Fresh Produce (2002)	Biscuits for Breakfast (2006)	Distance and Time (2007)

Biscuits for Breakfast is the second album from British musician Fin Greenall and, collectively as Fink, the band's debut album. It was released in 2006 on Ninja Tune.

== Background ==
Prior to this album, Fin Greenall had been DJing and producing for label Ninja Tune from around 1997. He cites listening to Zero 7's first album Simple Things as one of the many inspirations for him to try something a little different from his dub roots, and old friend Guy Whittaker as well as newly acquainted Tim Thornton saw the rebirth of the name "Fink" as a trio. It was released throughout Europe in the spring of 2006.

== Critical reception ==
The album has received generally positive reviews from music critics. Thom Jurek from Allmusic gave the album 3 1/2 stars out of 5, commenting that "there is a wonderfully intimate smokiness in Fink's approach to his songs". Ben Hogwood of musicOMH gave the album 4 out of 5 stars, saying of Greenall that he "sounds totally at ease expressing himself in this medium" and the album is "a small gem of a record". Pixelsurgeon awarded 9 circles out of 10, with Sam Gilbey praising the effort, as the "whole album swaggers with a natural confidence that few manage within any genre".

== Track listing ==
No.	Title	Composer(s)	Length
1.	"Pretty Little Thing"	Fin Greenall	4:35
2.	"Pills in My Pocket"	Fin Greenall, Tim Thornton, Guy Whittaker	4:31
3.	"You Gotta Choose"	Fin Greenall, Martin Haley, Tim Thornton, Guy Whittaker	3:16
4.	"All Cried Out"	Steve Jolley, Alison Moyet, Tony Swain	4:40
5.	"Hush Now"	Tina Grace, Fin Greenall	4:11
6.	"Biscuits for Breakfast"	Fin Greenall, Tim Thornton, Guy Whittaker	3:53
7.	"So Long"	Fin Greenall, E WanDan, Guy Whittaker	3:49
8.	"Kamlyn"	Fin Greenall, Martin Haley, Tim Thornton, Guy Whittaker	4:28
9.	"Sorry I'm Late (XFM Flo-Motion Session)"	Fin Greenall	4:34

== Personnel ==
- Fink – Vocals (exc. track 5), acoustic guitar, bass (on track 1), slide guitar (2, 4), keyboards (1, 5, 8), background vocals (5), effects (6), percussion (7)
- Guy Whittaker – Bass (2, 3, 6–8)
- Tim Thornton – Drums (2, 3, 6–8)
- Tina Grace – Vocals (5)
- E WanDan – Human beatbox (7)
- Martin Haley – Slide guitar (8)
- Produced and engineered by Fink, except

"Pills in My Pocket" produced and engineered by Ben Thackeray
"Sorry I'm Late" produced by Dean James and Sumit Bothra and engineered by Dean James

- Sumit Bothra – Management
- Kate O'Connor – Cover illustration
