= Tim Thornton (musician, born 1973) =

English musician, composer and novelist (born 1973)

Tim Thornton (born 1973) is an English musician, composer and novelist. He is best known as the drummer and guitarist for the English indie act Fink.

== Early life ==
He was born in Darlington. After a boarding-school education, he completed a degree in drama.

== Musicianship ==
In 2012, Thornton's music for the British short film Fish! was nominated for Best Score (Short Film) at the Idyllwild International Festival of Cinema and gained an Honorable Mention. In 2016 Thornton scored the music for another short film, The Five Wives and Lives of Melvyn Pfferberg, directed by Damian Samuels and starring Brooke D'Orsay and Callum Blue.

In 2006 Thornton was asked by a friend, singer/songwriter Fin Greenall of Fink, to contribute drums to the band's album Biscuits for Breakfast. He has been the band's drummer ever since, appearing on six studio albums for Ninja Tune: Biscuits for Breakfast (2006), Distance and Time (2007), Sort of Revolution (2009), Perfect Darkness (2011), Hard Believer (2014) and Resurgam (2017). Perfect Darkness was described by the BBC as "a writhing, surprisingly meaty addition to the over-crowded singer-songwriter genre".

== Writing ==
Thornton's debut novel The Alternative Hero (Jonathan Cape/Knopf, 2009) was described by The Guardian as "the indiest book of all time". It follows a young man's obsession with a band. His second novel, Death of an Unsigned Band, was published by Cape in July 2010. This also has a music-industry setting.

His third novel Felix Romsey's Afterparty was published by Unbound in Spring 2018.

Thornton is a regular blog contributor to The Huffington Post.
