= Garbage 2024 =

2024 concert tour by Garbage

- Tour by Garbage
- Location: Europe; North America
- Associated album: No Gods No Masters
- Start date: June 26, 2024
- End date: July 20, 2024
- Legs: 1 (1 cancelled)
- No. of shows: 16 (Europe); 3 (North America, cancelled)

Garbage concert chronology
- Garbage & Noel Gallagher's High Flying Birds: Live in Concert (2023); Garbage 2024 (2024); Happy Endings tour (2025)

Garbage 2024 is a 2024 headline concert tour by American alternative rock band Garbage in support of their seventh studio album No Gods No Masters. Initially, the tour was solely a European tour which included dates in Scotland, Spain, Italy, France, England and Germany. By the conclusion of the European tour, Garbage announced three North American festival dates as an extension to the tour, with dates in Mexico and the United States, however the North American leg was later cancelled after frontwoman Shirley Manson suffered an injury during the tour that would require surgery and rehabilitation as confirmed by the band's official Instagram account.

== Background ==
Posting on their official Instagram page on March 4, 2024, Garbage announced their first European tour in over five years, saying "So excited to announce that after 5 long years, we are finally returning to Europe this summer. Hope you will be able to join us". Tickets for the tour went on sale to the general public across Europe on 8 March 2024, with a pre–sale available on 7 March 2024. Garbage last toured in Europe in the summer of 2019, therefore this tour marks the first time the band plays songs from their album No Gods No Masters in the continent.

The first date of the tour was held in Italy on June 26 at the Circolo Magnolia in Milan. The tour continued with nine more dates in continental Europe and closed with six dates in the United Kingdom, the last date being at the OVO Arena Wembley in London, England on July 20.

The band was joined by Ginger Pooley on bass and backing vocals, marking the first time that another female musician performed with Garbage on tour and also that someone sang backing vocals.

Support was given by Lucia & The Best Boys in all dates except in Italy, where Romina Falconi opened for Garbage. Jehnny Beth was an additional guest on the closing show at the OVO Arena Wembley in London.

Following this headline tour and prior to the cancellation, Garbage was to play three festival dates: Festival Hera HSBC in Mexico City on August 24, HFStival in Washington D.C. on September 21, and Ohana Festival in Dana Point, California on September 27, before mixing and mastering their eighth studio album.

== Setlist ==
Milan (June 26, 2024)

1. "#1 Crush"
2. "Godhead"
3. "I Think I'm Paranoid"
4. "Cherry Lips (Go Baby Go!)"
5. "Special"
6. "The Men Who Rule the World"
7. "Metal Heart"
8. "Run Baby Run"
9. "Hammering in My Head"
10. "The Creeps"
11. "The Trick Is to Keep Breathing"
12. "Bleed Like Me"
13. "Stupid Girl"
14. "Wolves"
15. "No Gods No Masters"
16. "Cities in Dust"
17. "Push It"
18. "When I Grow Up"
19. "Why Do You Love Me"
20. "Vow"
1. "Milk"
2. "Only Happy When It Rains"

Garbage played five songs from No Gods No Masters, including its three singles "The Men Who Rule the World", "No Gods No Masters" and "Wolves" and album tracks "Godhead" and "The Creeps", the latter being performed for the first time on this tour. They also played their cover of "Cities in Dust" originally by Siouxsie and the Banshees, from that era. The rest of the setlist is made up of songs from all the other Garbage albums except Not Your Kind of People and Strange Little Birds. In Milan, the band let the fans choose the first song of the encore between "Milk" and "No Horses"; the audience chose the former. The setlist remained unchanged for the remainder of the European leg of the tour.

== Tour dates ==
The tour began on 26 June 2024, and ended on 20 July 2024. The band played a total of 16 shows across Europe.

Date	City	Country	Venue
June 26, 2024	Milan	Italy	Circolo Magnolia
June 27, 2024	Lausanne	Switzerland	Les Docks
June 29, 2024	Tilburg	Netherlands	013
June 30, 2024	Esch-sur-Alzette	Luxembourg	Rockhal
July 2, 2024	Wiesbaden	Germany	Kulturzentrum Schlachthof
July 4, 2024	Berlin	Germany	Verti Music Hall
July 5, 2024	Cologne	Germany	Palladium
July 6, 2024	Paris	France	Grand Rex
July 9, 2024	Barcelona	Spain	Razzmatazz
July 10, 2024	Madrid	Spain	Mad Cool
July 12, 2024	Glasgow	Scotland	TRNSMT Festival
July 14, 2024	Edinburgh	Scotland	Usher Hall
July 15, 2024	Bridlington	England	Bridlington Spa
July 17, 2024	Wolverhampton	England	Wolverhampton Civic Hall
July 19, 2024	Manchester	England	O2 Apollo
July 20, 2024	London	England	OVO Arena Wembley

=== Cancelled dates ===
Date	City	Country	Venue	Reason
August 24, 2024	Mexico City	Mexico	Festival Hera	Shirley Manson's injury
September 21, 2024	Washington D.C.	United States	HFStival	Shirley Manson's injury
September 27, 2024	Dana Point	United States	Ohana Festival	Shirley Manson's injury
