= No gods, no masters (disambiguation) =

No gods, no masters is a slogan originating in the anarchist and labor rights movements.

No gods, no masters may also refer to:

- No Gods No Masters, a 2021 album by Garbage
  - "No Gods No Masters" (song), a 2021 single by Garbage and the title track
- No Gods No Masters, a 2004 album by Criminal
- No Gods No Masters, a 2010 album by Harms Way
- "No Gods, No Masters", a 2011 song by Arch Enemy from Khaos Legions
- "No Gods, No Masters", a 2022 song by Machine Head from Of Kingdom and Crown
- No Gods No Masters: An Anthology of Anarchism, a 1965 book by Daniel Guérin
- No Gods No Masters, a part of the 1923 work September by Bulgarian author Geo Milev
- No God, No Master, a 2012 American crime film
