= The Jump with Shirley Manson =

Music podcast hosted by Shirley Manson

Presentation
- Hosted by: Shirley Manson
- Genre: Music
- Language: English
- Length: 15-25 minutes

Production
- Production: Mailchimp Presents, Little Everywhere
- No. of seasons: 3
- No. of episodes: 28

Publication
- Original release: June 24, 2019 – August 24, 2021

The Jump with Shirley Manson is a music podcast hosted by Garbage's singer Shirley Manson and co-produced by Mailchimp Presents and Little Everywhere, with executive producers Dann Gallucci, Jane Marie and Hrishikesh Hirway. Each episode of The Jump features a guest musician talking about a defining song that represented a breakthrough in the artist's own career and “the moments in an artist’s career where they decide to take a leap into something new.”

== Background ==
In 2014, Manson was interviewed by Hirway on episode 10 of the Song Exploder podcast about Garbage's song "Felt". Hirway presented her name to Mailchimp as a possible contender host for a new music podcast The Jump, a series that focuses on songs representing the turning points in the careers of successful musicians, and contacted Manson to offer her the position. Initially hesitant, Manson was convinced by her manager Paul Kremen to accept the call.

The first season features seven episodes, most of which were recorded in-person with only two recorded remotely. The first episode of the season was released on June 24, 2019, with other episodes coming weekly throughout July and August 2019. In 2020, The Jump was renewed for a 12-episode second season, which was released in August 2020. A 9-episode third season was released in August 2021. All the episodes of the third season were recorded remotely due to the COVID-19 pandemic.

Manson chose the guests of the series with talent booker Mara Davis in a collaborative process she defined "effortless". Guests are chosen from some of Manson's favourite artists of all time as well as new talents. In the process, Manson and Davis present a list of potential guests to Mailchimp, who have the final say on the decision. Manson wanted there to be both men and women, as well as provide LGBT representation on the show.

Episodes are often under 25 minutes in length. Manson explained that the main focus of the series is music making and song-writing, "the actual obsession with chasing an idea." Before each episode, Manson studies the artist's background "to have an idea of what’s been happening in their lives". However, she prefers to listen and ask questions based on the conversation rather than preparing a set list of questions prior to the interview.

Interviews for the podcast have inspired Manson's own song-writing and vocal production on Garbage's seventh studio album No Gods No Masters. In particular, Liz Phair's episode in the second season inspired Manson to pitch her vocals low like Phair on the track "Flipping the Bird" whilst the episode with George Clinton inspired the lyrics for the opening track and lead single "The Men Who Rule the World". Manson said the interview with Clinton was "one of the most extraordinary experiences of [her] life."

=== Future ===
Discussing the future of the podcast with Kyle Meredith, Manson is unsure whether the show will be renewed for a fourth season. In November 2021, Mailchimp, the company that initially signed Manson, got sold to Intuit, a bigger company. In the meantime, Manson's contract expired and she expressed doubts about it being renewed by Intuit, saying "the big company - I don't even know if they knew who I was [...] it just sort of fell by the wayside." Manson partly saw this as a personal failure: "I was sort of bummed, but then I was also like 'well, 'cause you're not that good'. I got really put down on myself."

== Episodes ==
Season 1
Episode	Guest	Song	Length
1	Perfume Genius	"Learning"	18:15
2	Big Boi	"Git Up, Git Out"	22:48
3	Esperanza Spalding	"I Want It Now"	20:12
4	Courtney Love	"Boys on the Radio"	16:40
5	Karen O	"Maps"	15:48
6	Dave 1	"100%"	24:54
7	Neko Case	"The Fox Confessor Brings the Flood"	17:39
Season 2
Episode	Guest	Song	Length
1	George Clinton	"Chocolate City"	17:56
2	Sharon Van Etten	"Love More"	19:42
3	Matt Berninger	"Fake Empire"	17:47
4	Jónsi	"Svefn-g-englar"	25:54
5	Brittany Howard	"Sound & Color"	21:27
6	DJ Shadow	"Six Days"	22:53
7	Juliette Lewis	"Hard Lovin' Woman"	21:01
8	Peaches	"Fuck the Pain Away"	19:43
9	Angel Olsen	"Shut Up Kiss Me"	19:02
10	Open Mike Eagle	"Qualifiers"	28:16
11	Laura Jane Grace	"I Was A Teenage Anarchist"	23:35
12	Liz Phair	"6'1""	23:04
Season 3
Episode	Guest	Song	Length
1	David Byrne	"Loco de Amor"	19:51
2	Joe Talbot	"1049 Gotho"	19:43
3	Rapsody	"Afeni"	25:17
4	Patti Smith	"Pissing In The River"	20:27
5	Run the Jewels	"A Christmas Fucking Miracle"	20:12
6	Kelsey Lu	"Let all the Poisons that Lurk in the Mud Seep Out"	16:55
7	Thundercat	"Dragonball Durag"	17:52
8	Robyn	"With Every Heartbeat"	23:30
9	Alanis Morissette	"You Oughta Know"	17:21

== Reception ==
Abby Jones from Consequence commended Manson's ability to conduct interviews despite being her first time as interview host, adding "[her] whip-smart sense of humor and unbridled passion lay the groundwork for incredibly enhancing, raw conversations." In an enthusiastic review for Girl Underground Music, Janette Ayub wrote on the first season that "Manson’s meaningful questions, alongside each guest’s story, leaves a surreal and refreshing take for all aspiring artists and dreamers alike." NME's Greg Cochrane and The Guardian's Hannah Verdier also praised Manson's hosting abilities.

The second season of the podcast was nominated at the 2021 Webby Awards.
