= Wolves (Garbage song) =

Single by Garbage

from the album No Gods No Masters
- Released: May 19, 2021
- Recorded: 2018–2020
- Genre: Alternative rock
- Length: 4:16
- Label: Stunvolume
- Songwriter: Garbage
- Producers: Garbage; Billy Bush

Garbage singles chronology
| "No Gods No Masters" (2021) | "Wolves" (2021) | "Witness to Your Love" (2022) |

"Wolves" is a song by American alternative rock band Garbage. It was released as the third and final single from the band's seventh studio album No Gods No Masters (2021) on May 19, 2021 by their independent label Stunvolume.

== Background and composition ==
"Wolves" is a guitar-driven alternative rock song with industrial, grunge and electronic elements. Singer Shirley Manson described it as the album's "pop song."

"Wolves" was inspired by the two wolves story which Manson read somewhere on Easter-European folklore about "the boy who had the wolves inside and this wrestling of good and evil". After she read the story, Manson left a note of it on her computer and never went back to it again, so she doesn't recall where it was from or who wrote it. The story was popularized by Billy Graham in his book The Holy Spirit: Activating God's Power in Your Life.

Manson said "Wolves" is "a song about inner conflict. About regret. About duality," dealing with the choice of good vs. evil and questioning "[w]ho are you going to be as a person? Are you going to be a force of harm or are you going to try to do good in the world?" She added "it's mostly to do with the battle with self and how we're all made up with different facets of our personality, and some are good, some are less impressive. And it's the struggle within oneself to try to be kind, try to be good, try to be the best you can be in your life and not resort to the worst version of yourself", joking that she finds as a human being she often resorts to being the worst version of herself.

Manson also conceded the song is a reflection on her cruelty and aggressiveness towards other people during her youth, explaining "[i]n the past I have hurt so many people in my life, both knowingly and unknowingly. But when you’re young and in self-survival mode, much like a baby rattlesnake, you have no idea how strong your venom is. But it has the power to kill. Meanwhile you’re just out there having fun." She further added that she believes aggressive behaviour as a response to an offense can be controlled and she pledges to do it by "choos[ing] kindness instead," continuing "I want to try and control the hardcore wolf and let the kind, soft wolf out instead." The lyrics were not only inspired by personal experiences, but also by Manson's nephew Syd, who she claims has a similar emotional makeup to her.

The artwork is an edit of an illustration of a wolf of Southern States by English soldier, artist and naturalist Charles Hamilton Smith.

== Release and promotion ==
"Wolves" was released as the third and final single from No Gods No Masters on May 19, 2021. The song was premiered on Apple Music 1 for The Zane Lowe Show 30 minutes before the release. The same day, the music video was released on the band's YouTube channel. The single edit of the song features shorter intro and a fade-out outro.

On June 10, a day before the No Gods No Masters release, Garbage performed "Wolves" on the Late Night with Seth Meyers show. A live performance of the song recorded at the Mates Rehearsal Studios in North Hollywood was sent to World Cafe to promote the album while keeping social distance during the ongoing COVID-19 pandemic.

== Music video ==
The music video was directed by Chilean video director and artist Javi Mi Amor. The animated video makes heavy use of stop motion and rotoscoping and features two wolves reflecting the song's theme of duality. The video also makes reference to previous Garbage music videos, featuring an animated version of the light bulb-headed man and the nuns surrounding Manson from the "Push It" music video and a female figure coloured in a pink-blue gradient representing Manson in the "Androgyny" music video. Due to the depiction of female nudity and allusions to sex, the YouTube video was flagged for adult content.

== Reception ==
Critical reception to "Wolves" was positive, with critics often remarking a similarity of the sound with Garbage's older works. James Rettig of Stereogum described the song as "a scorcher with some tangled-up guitars and a mewling Shirley Manson hook" whilst Mark Millar of XS Noize qualified it as "angularly powerful, hook-driven" and Damian Jones of NME as "stomping" and "vitriolic." Tyler Golsen of Far Out called the song a "glammy techno stomper." In his 8/10 review for No Gods No Masters on Under the Radar, Andy Von Pip praised "Wolves" for being "classic Garbage demonstrating their innate ability to craft futuristic dystopian doom pop." Austin Jones of Paste magazine also complimented the track, saying it was reminiscent of vintage Garbage. Andrew Trendell was also positive in his review of the album for NME, calling the track "a devious little desert rock pop beast." Lori Gava of XS Noize called the track "a free-wheeling examination of Narcissism run amok," saying it is "catchy as hell" and singling it out as a "must listen to" track on the album. Wall of Sound particularly complimented the track's and previous single "No Gods No Masters'" production, defining it "eighties style."

== Charts ==
Chart performance for "Wolves"
| Chart (2021) | Peak position |
|---|---|
| US Adult Alternative Airplay (Billboard) | 37 |
