= Happy Endings tour =

2025 concert tour by Garbage

- Tour by Garbage
- Location: North America
- Associated album: Let All That We Imagine Be the Light
- Start date: April 4, 2025
- End date: November 14, 2025
- No. of shows: 42
- Supporting acts: Starcrawler; My Chemical Romance

Garbage concert chronology
- Garbage 2024 (2024); Happy Endings tour (2025)

Happy Endings was a concert tour by American rock band Garbage in support of their eighth studio album Let All That We Imagine Be the Light (2025). The tour was announced on March 25 and includes 29 United States dates and two Canadian dates.

== Background ==
On March 22, 2025, a headlining Garbage concert at the Mountain Winery in Saratoga, California, was announced for October 23 with Starcrawler as special guests and tickets going on sale on March 28. The concert was later revealed to be part of the Happy Endings tour, the band's first headline tour of the US and Canada in 3 years, announced on March 25. The previous Garbage headline tour in the United States was a 7-date tour at the end of June 2022, which was cut short due to illness in the band. Thus, this marks the first long headline tour of the band in North America in seven years.

The tour begins with a concert in Orlando, Florida, on September 3, and ends with a show in Phoenix, Arizona, on November 2. Starcrawler will be special guests for the entire duration of the tour. Tickets were made available for pre-sale on April 1 and went on sale for the general public on April 4.

== Tour dates ==
List of 2025 concerts
Date (2025)	City	Country	Venue	Opening act
April 4 (Note: This show was part of Tecate Pal Norte.)	Monterrey	Mexico	Fundidora Park	—N/a
May 17 (Note: This show was part of Cruel World Festival.)	Pasadena	United States	Brookside at the Rose Bowl	—N/a
July 20 (Note: This show is set to be part of Minnesota Yacht Club Festival.)	Saint Paul	United States	Harriet Island	—N/a
August 2 (Note: This was an opening set for My Chemical Romance as part of their Long Live The Black Parade Tour)	Arlington	United States	Globe Life Field	—N/a
September 3	Orlando	United States	Hard Rock Café	Starcrawler
September 5	Pompano Beach	United States	Pompano Beach Amphitheatre	Starcrawler
September 6	St. Petersburg	United States	Jannus Live	Starcrawler
September 8	Atlanta	United States	The Eastern	Starcrawler
September 10	Nashville	United States	The Pinnacle	Starcrawler
September 12	Cleveland	United States	Agora Theatre	Starcrawler
September 13	Detroit	United States	Masonic Cathedral Theatre	Starcrawler
September 16	Philadelphia	United States	Franklin Music Hall	Starcrawler
September 17	Washington	United States	The Anthem	Starcrawler
September 18	Boston	United States	Roadrunner	Starcrawler
September 20	New York	United States	Brooklyn Paramount	Starcrawler
September 21	New Haven	United States	College Street Music Hall	Starcrawler
September 23	Pittsburgh	United States	Stage AE	Starcrawler
September 24	Toronto	Canada	History	Starcrawler
September 26 (Note: This show is set to be part of Ohana Festival.)	Dana Point	United States	Doheny State Beach	—N/a
September 29	Chicago	United States	The Salt Shed	Starcrawler
September 30	Newport	United States	MegaCorp Pavilion	Starcrawler
October 1	Columbus	United States	KEMBA Live!	Starcrawler
October 3	Madison	United States	The Sylvee	Starcrawler
October 4	Minneapolis	United States	First Avenue	Starcrawler
October 6	Kansas City	United States	Midland Theatre	Starcrawler
October 7	Dallas	United States	The Bomb Factory	Starcrawler
October 8	Austin	United States	ACL Live at The Moody Theater	Starcrawler
October 10	Oklahoma	United States	The Criterion	Starcrawler
October 12	Denver	United States	The Mission Ballroom	Starcrawler
October 15	Seattle	United States	Paramount Theatre	Starcrawler
October 17	Boise	United States	Knitting Factory	Starcrawler
October 18	Spokane	United States	Knitting Factory Spokane	Starcrawler
October 20	Vancouver	Canada	Orpheum	Starcrawler
October 21	Portland	United States	McMenamins Crystal Ballroom	Starcrawler
October 23	Saratoga	United States	The Mountain Winery	Starcrawler
October 24	San Francisco	United States	The Warfield	Starcrawler
October 26	Reno	United States	Silver Legacy Resort Casino	Starcrawler
October 29	Salt Lake City	United States	Rockwell at The Complex	Starcrawler
October 31	Las Vegas	United States	The Cosmopolitan of Las Vegas	Starcrawler
November 2	Phoenix	United States	The Van Buren	Starcrawler
November 5	Los Angeles	United States	Hollywood Palladium	Starcrawler
November 14 (Note: This show is set to be part of Corona Capital Festival.)	Mexico City	Mexico	Autódromo Hermanos Rodríguez	—N/a
