= The Chemicals =

Single by Garbage
- Released: April 18, 2015
- Recorded: 2015; California, US
- Genre: Alternative rock; electronica
- Length: 4:20
- Label: Stunvolume
- Songwriter: Garbage
- Producer: Garbage

Garbage singles chronology
"Girls Talk" (2014)	"The Chemicals" (2015)	"Empty" (2016)

"The Chemicals" is a single released by rock band Garbage for Record Store Day 2015. It features Brian Aubert (of Silversun Pickups) on co-vocals. The song was the first track recorded by the band during sessions for their sixth album, Strange Little Birds. Drummer Butch Vig described "The Chemicals" as "a very dense Garbage track".

In 2021, both "The Chemicals" and "On Fire" would be included on the deluxe edition bonus disc of Garbage's seventh album, No Gods No Masters.

== Release ==
For Record Store Day 2015, the single was pressed onto 10" fluorescent orange vinyl and backed with a new cut titled "On Fire". The sleeve art was designed by Ryan Corey for Smog Design, from a traditional 19th century Mexican retablo depicting the Catholic church iconography of the "anima sola", or lonely soul in purgatory.

In the United States, "The Chemicals" was listed as a Record Store Day Exclusive release, and limited to 4,000 units. The single was the number 46 biggest selling Record Store Day (RSD) release of that year. In the United Kingdom, the pressing was limited to 500 copies, and debuted at number 49 on the Physical Singles chart. The following week, the single rose to number 33, and debuted at number 32 on the Vinyl Singles chart. A worldwide digital release of the two tracks followed on June 2, under the title "The Chemicals / On Fire".

"The Chemicals" is the third consecutive single release recorded by Garbage for Record Store Day, following 2014's "Girls Talk", and their 2013's cover version of "Because the Night". In 2012, there were also RSD pressings of Not Your Kind of People singles "Blood for Poppies"" and "Battle In Me".

== Music video ==
Director Sophie Muller created a visual clip for "The Chemicals" by editing footage of her family and friends that was filmed at a London nightclub with the audio track. Manson and Muller had discussed the aesthetics of small punk rock clubs, and their demise over the past thirty or so years. Both women had experienced such concerts in their formative years: "sweaty excitement... the sensuality that comes when you cram people in such a tiny space." Muller offered to cut the footage she had to "The Chemicals".

The music video premiered on the Mashable website on April 15, 2015. KROQ commended the use of underground rave imagery, and of the European/Berlin club scene that the visuals evoke, as well as Muller's shots and editing.

== Reception ==
Nylon magazine gave a positive write-up to "The Chemicals", declaring that the song "flaunts Shirley Manson's signature sultry vocals in a simple, building chorus that teems with anticipation, ready to erupt into a burst of head-banging bass and percussion."

== Track listing ==
- 10" single STNVOL011 (Record Store Day release)
- Digital single (titled "The Chemicals / On Fire")
1. "The Chemicals" – 4:20
2. "On Fire" – 5:07

== Charts ==
Chart performance for "The Chemicals"
Chart (2015)	Peak position
UK Physical Singles (Official Charts Company)	33
UK Vinyl Singles (Official Charts Company)	32

== Release history ==
Release history and formats for "The Chemicals"
Region	Release date	Record label	Format
United States, United Kingdom	April 18, 2015	Stunvolume	10" vinyl
Various	June 2, 2015	Stunvolume	Digital release
