= No Gods No Masters =

Studio album by Garbage
- Released: June 11, 2021
- Recorded: 2020–2021
- Studios: Red Razor (Atwater Village, California); GrungeIsDead (Silver Lake, California)
- Genres: Electronic rock; industrial rock; synth-pop; post-grunge
- Length: 46:07
- Labels: Stunvolume; Infectious Music
- Producers: Garbage; Billy Bush

Garbage chronology
Strange Little Birds (2016)	No Gods No Masters (2021)	Anthology (2022)

Singles from No Gods No Masters
- 1. "The Men Who Rule the World" Released: March 30, 2021; 2. "No Gods No Masters" Released: April 28, 2021; 3. "Wolves" Released: May 19, 2021

No Gods No Masters is the seventh studio album by American rock band Garbage. It was released on June 11, 2021, through the band's own label Stunvolume. The album was distributed worldwide by Infectious Music and BMG and preceded by the singles "The Men Who Rule the World", "No Gods No Masters" and "Wolves".

"This is our seventh record, the significant numerology of which affected the DNA of its content: the seven virtues, the seven sorrows, and the seven deadly sins," singer Shirley Manson explained, describing No Gods No Masters as "a critique of the rise of capitalist short-sightedness, racism, sexism and misogyny across the world."

== Background and recording ==
In 2017, Garbage recorded and released a standalone digital single titled "No Horses", which the band hinted could be the direction their new material would sound. They began recording for their seventh album in April 2018 in Palm Springs, following preliminary work at Butch Vig's home studio. The quartet sketched out the skeleton of the album over two weeks, jamming, experimenting and feeling the songs out. Work was paused in the latter half of 2018, as Garbage marked the twentieth anniversary of their second album Version 2.0 (1998) with the two-month 20 Years Paranoid tour, before reconvening in Los Angeles to finish the project.

In mid-2019, Vig said they had about 35 jams and seven or eight of them were beginning to shape into songs. Manson described the material from the album writing sessions as "cinematic". Vig remarked on musical references to Roxy Music and Talking Heads, while also noting that the album was quite eclectic, similar to 2001's Beautiful Garbage, in that each song has its own identity. At first Vig thought the album would go in a more orchestral direction, but this changed when the music was developed further to match the intensity of Manson's vocals. "It's certainly a different-sounding record than our last couple [of albums]. It has lots of guitars, lots of melodies and hooks. It's poppier than the last record," explained Manson, "We were very inspired by the weird, subversive pop of Roxy Music—that was kind of our muse. Not that it sounds anything like Roxy Music, but that was definitely something we thought about a lot."

Recording work began in earnest from September until March 2020, when COVID-19 restrictions impacted after the final week of recording. Various bass guitar parts were recorded by Eric Avery, Justin Meldal-Johnsen and Daniel Shulman, all of whom had played on previous Garbage albums. Finishing touches were applied via digital collaboration; the album was mixed throughout July 2020. The album was completed in September 2020. No Gods No Masters is self-produced by Garbage, in collaboration with their long-time studio engineer and mixer Billy Bush. It was mastered by Heba Kadry.

On March 30, 2021, Garbage announced the deluxe edition of the album would include a second disc featuring "No Horses" and other seven tracks, including collaborations with Screaming Females, Brian Aubert, Brody Dalle and John Doe and Exene Cervenka of X, previously released from 2013 to 2018 on Record Store Day. The bonus tracks on the deluxe edition were remastered by Heba Kadry, except "No Horses", "Starman" and "Destroying Angels" mastered by Joe Laporta, and "On Fire" and "Time Will Destroy Everything" mastered by Emily Lazar.

Two outtakes from the album sessions, "Blue Betty" and "Adam and Eve", were released on April 22, 2023, on the Record Store Day vinyl exclusive Witness to Your Love EP.

The album's title and its title track are named after the anarchist slogan "no gods, no masters" as a reaction to the frustration Manson felt having no power to speak up against "Trump's racism" and how "organized religion is responsible for [...] allowing other seats of power to get away with stomping on the rights of other human beings." The cover of the album is a photograph taken by Manson in the Dean Cemetery, in Edinburgh, Scotland. Manson photographed the statue of two sister angels and sent it to the band's graphic artist Ryan Corey, who edited one of the two angels out.

== Composition ==
Manson had written most of the lyrics for the album by the end of 2019, with a few finishing touches at the end of the sessions in February/March 2020. As the album title suggests, many songs on the album deal with different aspects of the concept of power, referencing social injustice, racism, patriarchy and the disillusionment with organized religion, touching upon the Black Lives Matter and MeToo movements, and also being fueled by the lack of empathy of white people towards protests for human rights happening all around the world. Vig felt that Manson's lyrics were reflective of the current political period, describing them as "kind of dark and edgy" and that the lyrics might not have been explicit and direct had they written the songs 10 or 15 years earlier. Manson remarked how the lyrics seemed prescient of the sociopolitical shifts caused by the COVID-19 pandemic, which was posthumous to the writing of the album.

The album opens with the lead single "The Men Who Rule the World", which according to Manson is an anti-racist, anti-capitalist and anti-patriarchal statement of intent. Prior to the writing of the song, Manson had interviewed George Clinton for the second season of her podcast The Jump, and was inspired by his P-Funk Mothership concept, which is based on the idea of creating an alternative reality free of racism and hate. Some of the lyrics were also inspired by the revolts of South American women who stood outside the government buildings "with their fists in the air, screaming [...] "you are the violator, we want to destroy you" kind of thing".

"The Creeps" was developed from words Manson had written in 2009 describing when she was dropped as a solo artist by Interscope, not long after the dissolution of Garbage's deal with Geffen, but had tried for 12 years to use elsewhere. The song deals with anxiety, insecurity and feelings of worthlessness and references an autobiographical episode where Manson was driving in Los Feliz Boulevard in Los Angeles and saw a life-sized poster of Garbage in a garage sale "for something like three bucks", which left her feeling ashamed and humiliated. Another personal track, "Uncomfortably Me", had been aided by overindulging in mezcal cocktails; it mentions the hardships of being Scottish living in a foreign country and the difficulty Manson had to endure after the death of her mother.

Described as the album's "pop song" and referencing the Two Wolves legend, "Wolves" recalls the power of youth and the danger therein. It was released as the album's third single. Centrepiece track "Waiting for God" is about police shootings of Black people and the disbelief towards organized religion in the face of injustice and lack of empathy. The song was written long before the 2020 murder of George Floyd and was instead inspired by the 2012 killing of Trayvon Martin, a 17-year old boy who was shot walking home at night from a grocery store after engaging in a physical altercation with another man.

"Godhead" examines the patriarchal structures at place in modern society. Many critics and interviewers noted the influence of Depeche Mode on the sound of the track, a sentiment that Manson ascribed to them being a "touchstone" influence for Garbage and to the fact that the song was written around a drum machine loop with basic guitars and keyboards. The most Roxy Music-inspired track on the album, "Anonymous XXX", is lyrically based on Manson's own fascination with "the hidden and the secrets and the self-deception" driving people to casual sexual relationships. "A Woman Destroyed" started as an attempt to flip the narrative on what was happening with the MeToo movement, where Manson felt women were being victimized by the media. Inspired by the Persian movie A Girl Walks Home Alone at Night, by Ana Lily Amirpour, the song is "a cinematic fantasy of revenge.”

Manson's podcast interview with Liz Phair inspired the vocals of "Flipping the Bird", where she deliberately pitched her vocal low like Phair. The song's lyrics were inspired by the book Men Explain Things to Me by Rebecca Solnit and deal with episodes of mansplaining. Title track "No Gods No Masters" came from Manson seeing graffiti on heritage buildings in Santiago, Chile, when she visited during civil demonstrations (estallido social) for the making of the Peace Peace Now Now documentary. The song reimagines a future society without corporate greed. The first lyric of the song, "be kind", was made prominent in the album's booklet and used as slogan on the band's touring gear throughout the 2021-2022 tour dates. "This City Will Kill You" began as Manson's love song to Los Angeles, but developed into something darker, an "elegy to loss and the past", which she believes is the most sophisticated song that she has ever written.

== Release and promotion ==
No Gods No Masters was announced on March 30, 2021, with pre-orders going live at the same time the audio and music video for "The Men Who Rule the World", directed by Chilean artist and director Javi Mi Amor, were released. A second single, the title track, and its music video, directed by Scott Stuckey, were released digitally on April 28. Third single and video "Wolves", also directed by Javi Mi Amor, was released on May 19.

The album was released on CD and both white and neon green vinyl LP pressings, as well as a deluxe edition featuring a bonus disc of the band's standalone singles released between 2013 and 2018. The deluxe edition was also made available digitally. A Record Store Day pink-vinyl pressing (with alternate cover art) was released in a limited edition run of 2,700 units.

On June 10, Garbage performed "Wolves" on the Late Night with Seth Meyers show. Over the summer, Garbage provided videos of live performances from the album recorded at Mates Rehearsal Studios in North Hollywood in May to Ouï FM, Rolling Stone France, iHeart Radio and World Cafe. On June 17, the music video of "The Creeps" premiered on the band's YouTube channel, followed by the music video of "Anonymous XXX" on October 7. Both videos were directed by Javi Mi Amor. To promote the album, Shirley Manson featured on the Australian Today show, on The Project, on FaceCulture, on Entertainment Tonight Canada, on Channel 4 News, on Sunday Brunch, and on Virgin Radio Italia.

No Gods No Masters was supported in summer 2021 with an arena concert tour with Garbage as guests of Alanis Morissette. The tour went on to become the most successful female-fronted tour of the year, selling more than 500,000 tickets. On October 20, the 10-date UK Against the Odds Tour by Blondie featuring Garbage as special guest was announced for November. However, the tour was later postponed to spring 2022, featuring Johnny Marr instead of Garbage as special guest due to scheduling conflicts. On November 21, Tears for Fears announced the 21-date May-June 2022 United States wing of The Tipping Point World Tour featuring Garbage as special guest. On March 9, 2022, Morissette announced her July 2022 tour dates celebrating 25 years of Jagged Little Pill, featuring Garbage as opening act in 10 of the 14 North American dates. On April 14, Garbage announced a 7-date United States headline tour at the end of June supported by Glass Battles. However, the last four dates of the tour were cancelled due to illness in the band.

On September 7, Garbage revealed their third best-of compilation, Anthology, released on October 28; it includes three songs from No Gods No Masters remastered in 2022: "No Horses", "The Men Who Rule the World" and "No Gods No Masters". On October 4, Garbage performed their James Bond theme "The World Is Not Enough" at the Royal Albert Hall in London with the Royal Philharmonic Orchestra as part of The Sound of 007 in Concert curated by composer David Arnold, marking the 60th anniversary of the Bond franchise. On October 22, Garbage played at Audacy's 9th annual We Can Survive at the Hollywood Bowl in Los Angeles.

On December 9, a music video for "Godhead" was uploaded to the band's YouTube channel. It was presented to the band by long-time fan Eduardo Bernal Pérez. In Summer 2023, Garbage embarked on a 25-date North American co-headline tour with Noel Gallagher's High Flying Birds, with support from Metric, followed by four Latin American tour dates in September.

On March 4, 2024 Garbage announced their first European tour in five years. The sixteen-dates tour marks the first time the band played songs from No Gods No Masters in the continent.

== Critical reception ==
Professional ratings
Aggregate scores
Source	Rating
AnyDecentMusic?	7.2/10
Metacritic	77/100
Review scores
Source	Rating
AllMusic	4.5/5 stars
Clash	8/10
DIY	3.5/5 stars
Exclaim!	4/5
The Independent	3/5 stars
NME	4/5 stars
Pitchfork	7.3/10
Record Collector	3/5 stars
Rolling Stone	3.5/5 stars
Slant Magazine	3.5/5 stars

The album was generally well received by critics. At Metacritic, which assigns a weighted average score out of 100 to reviews and ratings from mainstream critics, the album has received a metascore of 77, based on 21 critic reviews.

In his 4/5 review, Andrew Trendell of NME called No Gods No Masters the band's best album in 20 years, a perception shared by other reviewers as well. Wall of Sound scored the album 8/10, revealing: "There will be those that will argue that this is an anti-male record, and that Garbage have gone too woke. But in reality, it's an anti-power record, and that power needs to be held to account." In the review for AllMusic, Neil Z. Yeung called it "a highlight in their discography and one of their best works to date, a potent and outspoken dose of genre-blending artistry that confidently returns Garbage to their position as a band perpetually ahead of the curve." Clash's Chloe Waterhouse claimed that the album "screams quintessential Garbage, maturing into the political elder sister of their 1995 debut", and that it "feels like listening to Garbage again for the very first time, which is a terrifically thrilling prospect."

Reviewing the album for DIY, Ben Tipple described it as "[b]oth rhythmic and chaotic, it mirrors the frenetic turbulence of the times that have inspired it." Comparing the release to Garbage's previous albums, Pitchfork's Alfred Soto declared it "Faster and friskier than expected, No Gods, No Masters is their strongest album since Version 2.0." In Rolling Stone, Kory Grow stated that "for all of the group's abundant signature moves on No Gods No Masters, the record never feels like a nostalgia bid. That's because after 26 years, Garbage know who they are and are comfortable with themselves."

The Independent's Roisin O'Connor assessed the level of creativity displayed on the album; "On No Gods No Masters, Garbage stretch beyond the gilded cage of their Nineties icon status to reach for something new – often, but not always, to effective ends." In the review for American Songwriter, Hal Horowitz was more critical of the record; "The heightened level of fury and overall frustration about the state of society is admirable. Some might say there is not enough of it in today's music. But that needs to be balanced with songs which beckon you back for another listen, an aspect of the confrontational No Gods No Monsters [sic] that too often falls short."

== Commercial performance ==
In US the album peaked at number 33 on the US Billboard 200 with 17,000 units (16,000 album sales 1,000 SEA units) sold in its first week. The album entered the charts at number five in the UK, representing the band’s highest chart position since 2005’s Bleed Like Me. It also peaked at number 2 on the UK Independent Albums charts, staying on the charts for six weeks. It re-entered the chart on January 6, 2022 at number 48. In Australia, it's the seventh consecutive Top 10 Garbage album, peaking at number 5.

== Track listing ==
All tracks are written by Shirley Manson, Duke Erikson, Steve Marker, and Butch Vig, except where noted.

Standard edition
No.	Title	Length
1.	"The Men Who Rule the World"	4:27
2.	"The Creeps"	3:33
3.	"Uncomfortably Me"	3:16
4.	"Wolves"	4:16
5.	"Waiting for God"	4:04
6.	"Godhead"	4:08
7.	"Anonymous XXX"	4:07
8.	"A Woman Destroyed"	5:32
9.	"Flipping the Bird"	3:37
10.	"No Gods No Masters"	4:31
11.	"This City Will Kill You"	4:36
Total length:		46:07

Deluxe edition bonus disc
No.	Title	Writer(s)	Length
1.	"No Horses"		5:23
2.	"Starman"	David Bowie	4:08
3.	"Girls Talk" (featuring Brody Dalle)		3:34
4.	"Because the Night" (featuring Screaming Females)	Patti Smith; Bruce Springsteen	4:55
5.	"On Fire"		5:07
6.	"The Chemicals" (featuring Brian Aubert)		4:20
7.	"Destroying Angels" (featuring John Doe and Exene Cervenka)	Manson; Erikson; Marker; Vig; Doe; Cervenka	5:01
8.	"Time Will Destroy Everything"		4:44
Total length:			37:12

LP side one
No.	Title	Length
1.	"The Men Who Rule the World"	4:27
2.	"The Creeps"	3:33
3.	"Uncomfortably Me"	3:16
4.	"Wolves"	4:16
5.	"Anonymous XXX"	4:07
6.	"Waiting for God"	4:04
Total length:		23:43

LP side two
No.	Title	Length
1.	"Godhead"	4:08
2.	"A Woman Destroyed"	5:32
3.	"Flipping the Bird"	3:37
4.	"No Gods No Masters"	4:31
5.	"This City Will Kill You"	4:36
Total length:		22:24

== Personnel ==
Garbage

- Shirley Manson – vocals, keyboards, production, cover photo, band photo
- Duke Erikson – guitar, keyboards, percussion, background vocals, production, band photo; piano (2.2), bass (2.4, 2.5, 2.8)
- Steve Marker – bass, drum programming, drums, guitar, humming, keyboards, programming, background vocals, production, band photo
- Butch Vig – drums, guitar, keyboards, background vocals, production, band photo

Additional musicians

- Justin Meldal-Johnson – bass (1.1, 1.7)
- Eric Avery – bass (1.4, 1.9, 1.10, 2.6)
- Daniel Shulman – bass (1.11)
- Brody Dalle – vocals (2.3)
- Michael Abbate – bass (2.4)
- Jarrett Dougherty – drums (2.4)
- Marissa Paternoster – vocals, guitar (2.4)
- Brian Aubert – vocals (2.6)
- Chris Wagoner – accordion, violin (2.7)
- John Doe – bass, guitar (2.7)
- Christine Cervenka – vocals (2.7)

Technical

- Billy Bush – production, mixing, engineering
- Heba Kadry – mastering (1.1–1.11)
- Joe LaPorta – mastering (2.1, 2.2, 2.7)
- Brendan Dekora – mastering (2.2, 2.7)
- Emily Lazar – mastering (2.5, 2.6, 2.8)
- Mike Fasano – mastering (2.7), instrument technician (2.2)

Design

- Ryan Corey – art direction, design

== Charts ==
Chart performance for No Gods No Masters
Chart (2021)	Peak position
Australian Albums (ARIA)	5
Austrian Albums (Ö3 Austria)	13
Belgian Albums (Ultratop Flanders)	134
Belgian Albums (Ultratop Wallonia)	10
Dutch Albums (Album Top 100)	79
French Albums (SNEP)	40
German Albums (Offizielle Top 100)	6
Irish Albums (Official Charts)	42
Italian Albums (FIMI)	63
New Zealand Albums (RMNZ)	34
Portuguese Albums (AFP)	48
Scottish Albums (Official Charts)	2
Spanish Albums (Promusicae)	35
Swiss Albums (Schweizer Hitparade)	13
UK Albums (Official Charts)	5
UK Independent Albums (Official Charts)	2
US Billboard 200	33
US Independent Albums (Billboard)	3
US Top Alternative Albums (Billboard)	3
US Top Rock Albums (Billboard)	5

== Release history ==
Release dates and formats for No Gods No Masters
Region	Date	Label	Distributor	Format(s)
Australia and New Zealand	June 11, 2021	Stunvolume	Liberator Music	Standard: CD; LP (white/green) Deluxe: 2×CD, digital album
Various	June 11, 2021	Stunvolume	Infectious Music; BMG	Standard: CD; LP (white/green) Deluxe: 2×CD, digital album
United States and United Kingdom	June 10, 2021	Stunvolume	Infectious Music; BMG	Standard: LP (pink) (Record Store Day release)
