= Jane Marie =

American journalist and podcast producer

- Born: Jane Marie Golombisky; 1978 (age 47–48); Ann Arbor, Michigan
- Occupations: Podcast producer, journalist
- Children: 1
- Writing career
- Pen name: Jane Marie
- Period: Contemporary
- Genre: Nonfiction
- Subjects: Business/finance, health
- Notable works: This American Life, The Dream

Jane Marie (February 12, 1978) is a Peabody and Emmy Award-winning journalist well known for producing This American Life for nearly a decade. She now co-owns Little Everywhere, a podcast production house and recording studio in Los Angeles.

== Biography ==
Marie was born Jane Marie Golombisky in Ann Arbor, Michigan on February 12, 1978. After dropping out of high-school and earning a diploma through the mail, she graduated with honors from the University of Illinois. Marie started her career in 2002 as an intern at This American Life before being promoted to producer and music supervisor of TAL and television series of the same name.

Marie still consults as music supervisor on the TAL radio show. Also a writer, she served as an editor for Jezebel and The Hairpin and has penned regular columns for sites including The Toast and Cosmopolitan. Marie launched a Jezebel advice column titled "Dear Jane" in 2017, answering questions on everything from sex to racism.

External videos
- After Words interview with Jane Marie on Selling the Dream, March 15, 2024, C-SPAN

In 2016, she partnered with musician, producer and audio engineer Dann Gallucci to open a podcast production house and recording studio called Little Everywhere. In addition to working with clients Midroll, Earwolf, Stitcher and Audible, she is the host of Tinder's official podcast, DTR. In 2024, her book Selling the Dream: The Billion Dollar Industry Bankrupting Americans about the multi-level marketing industry was published by Simon & Schuster's Atria Publishing Group.

Her decision to go solely by her first and middle names came after marrying and subsequently divorcing Rick Feltes and comedian Julian McCullough, with whom she has a daughter, Goldie. Marie and Goldie live in Los Angeles, California.

== Awards ==
- 2020: The Webbys Award: Best Podcast Writing
- 2019: iHeart Radio Award, Best Branded Podcast "DTR"
- 2009: Emmy Award nomination, Outstanding Nonfiction Series, This American Life
- 2008: Emmy Award, Outstanding Nonfiction Series, This American Life
- 2007: IDA Continuing Series Award, This American Life
- 2006: Peabody Award, This American Life
