= Garbage & Noel Gallagher's High Flying Birds: Live in Concert =

2023 concert tour

- Co-headline tour by Garbage and Noel Gallagher's High Flying Birds
- Garbage & Noel Gallagher's High Flying Birds: Live in Concert poster
- Start date: June 2, 2023
- End date: July 15, 2023
- No. of shows: 23 in the United States (1 cancelled); 1 in Canada; 24 total (1 cancelled)
- Guests: Metric
Noel Gallagher's High Flying Birds tour chronology
Stranded on the Earth World Tour (2018–19)	Garbage & Noel Gallagher's High Flying Birds: Live in Concert (2023)
Garbage tour chronology
20 Years Paranoid (2018)	Garbage & Noel Gallagher's High Flying Birds: Live in Concert (2023)	Garbage 2024 (2024)

Garbage & Noel Gallagher's High Flying Birds: Live in Concert was a co-headline concert tour by American alternative rock band Garbage and British alternative rock band Noel Gallagher's High Flying Birds. The North American tour consisted of 24 United States dates and one Canadian date, with Metric as special guests in the United States dates.

The tour was announced on February 13, 2023, with tickets going on sale on February 17. An Atlanta date was added on February 27, with tickets going on sale on March 3. It began on June 2 in Auburn and ended on July 15 in Boston.

Noel Gallagher's High Flying Birds toured in support of their fourth studio album, Council Skies, which was released on the day the tour began. Garbage continued their tour in support of their seventh studio album, No Gods No Masters (2021).

== Tour dates ==
Date	City	Country	Venue
June 2, 2023	Auburn	United States	White River Amphitheatre
June 3, 2023	Ridgefield	United States	RV Inn Style Resorts Amphitheater
June 6, 2023	Concord	United States	Concord Pavilion
June 7, 2023	Santa Barbara	United States	Santa Barbara Bowl
June 9, 2023	Los Angeles	United States	Greek Theatre
June 10, 2023	San Diego	United States	North Island Credit Union Amphitheatre
June 11, 2023	Phoenix	United States	Talking Stick Resort Amphitheatre
June 13, 2023	Salt Lake City	United States	USANA Amphitheatre
June 15, 2023	Denver	United States	Levitt Pavilion Denver
June 17, 2023	Dallas	United States	Dos Equis Pavilion
June 18, 2023	Del Valle	United States	Germania Insurance Amphitheater
June 21, 2023	West Palm Beach	United States	iTHINK Financial Amphitheatre
June 22, 2023	Tampa	United States	Credit Union Amphitheatre
June 24, 2023	Alpharetta	United States	Ameris Bank Amphiteatre
June 25, 2023	Franklin	United States	FirstBank Amphitheater
June 27, 2023	Chicago	United States	Huntington Bank Pavilion at Northerly Island
June 29, 2023	Noblesville	United States	Ruoff Music Center
July 1, 2023	Cincinnati	United States	Riverbend Music Center
July 3, 2023	Toronto	Canada	Budweiser Stage
July 6, 2023	Clarkson	United States	Pine Knob Music Theatre
July 8, 2023 (Note: The 8 July 2023 concert was called off following Metric and Garbage's sets due to a bomb threat at the venue. As such, Noel Gallagher's High Flying Birds did not perform.)	Saratoga Springs	United States	Saratoga Performing Arts Center
July 10, 2023	New York City	United States	Capital One City Parks Foundation SummerStage
July 13, 2023	Columbia	United States	Merriweather Post Pavilion
July 14, 2023	Philadelphia	United States	TD Pavilion at the Mann
July 15, 2023	Boston	United States	MGM Music Hall at Fenway

=== Cancelled Dates ===
Date	City	Country	Venue	Reason
June 28, 2023	Madison	United States	Breese Stevens Field	Poor air quality brought on by the ongoing Canadian wildfires
