= Garbage (band) =

American rock band

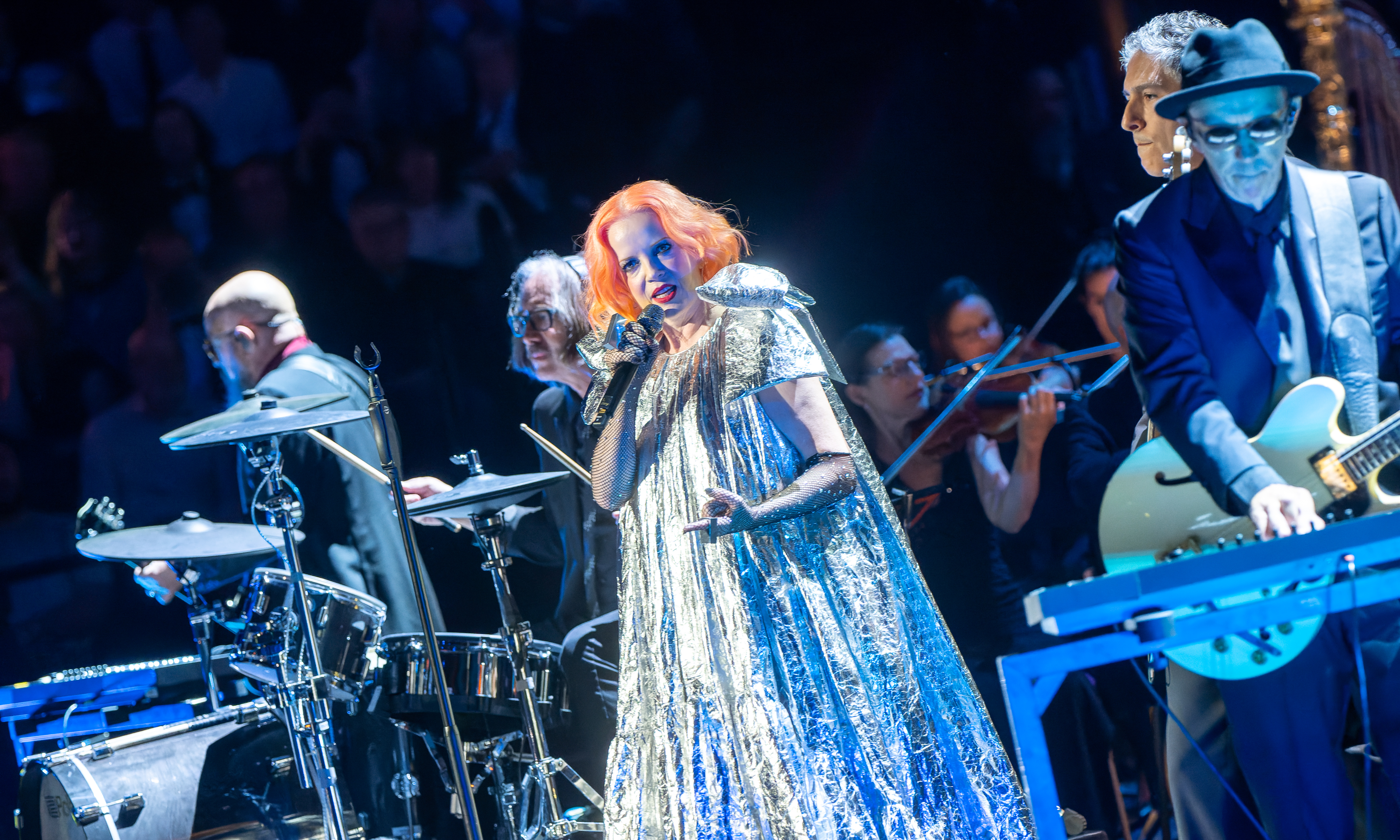
- Garbage in 2022

Background information
- Origin: Madison, Wisconsin, U.S.
- Genres: Alternative rock; electronic rock; dance-rock; trip hop; industrial rock
- Years active: 1993–2005; 2007; 2010–present
- Labels: Almo Sounds; Interscope; Geffen; A&E; Stunvolume
- Spinoff of: Angelfish; Fire Town; Spooner
- Members: Duke Erikson; Butch Vig; Steve Marker; Shirley Manson
- Website: garbage.com

Garbage is an American rock band formed in 1993 in Madison, Wisconsin. The band's line-up, consisting of Scottish musician Shirley Manson (vocals) and American musicians Duke Erikson (guitar, bass, keyboards), Steve Marker (guitar, keyboards), and Butch Vig (drums, percussion), has remained unchanged since its inception. All four members are involved in songwriting and production. Garbage has sold over 17 million albums worldwide.

The band's 1995 eponymous debut album was critically acclaimed, selling over four million copies and achieving double platinum certification in the UK, the US, and Australia. It was accompanied by a string of increasingly successful singles, including "Stupid Girl" and "Only Happy When It Rains". Follow-up Version 2.0 (1998) was equally successful, topping the UK Albums Chart and receiving two Grammy Award nominations. The band followed this by performing and co-producing the theme song to the 19th James Bond film The World Is Not Enough (1999). Their third album Beautiful Garbage (2001) was also critically praised, but failed to match the commercial success of its predecessors, despite selling over a million copies in its first three months.

Garbage quietly disbanded amidst the troubled production of their fourth album Bleed Like Me (2005), but regrouped to complete the album, which peaked at a career-high number four in the US. The band cut short their Bleed Like Me concert tour and announced an indefinite hiatus to pursue separate interests. It was briefly interrupted in 2007, when they recorded new tracks for their greatest hits album Absolute Garbage. The band reunited in 2011, and self-released their fifth album, Not Your Kind of People (2012), on their own label Stunvolume to positive reviews. They followed it with Strange Little Birds (2016) and No Gods No Masters (2021). The band's eighth studio album, Let All That We Imagine Be the Light, was released on May 30, 2025.

== History ==
=== Formation (1993–1994) ===
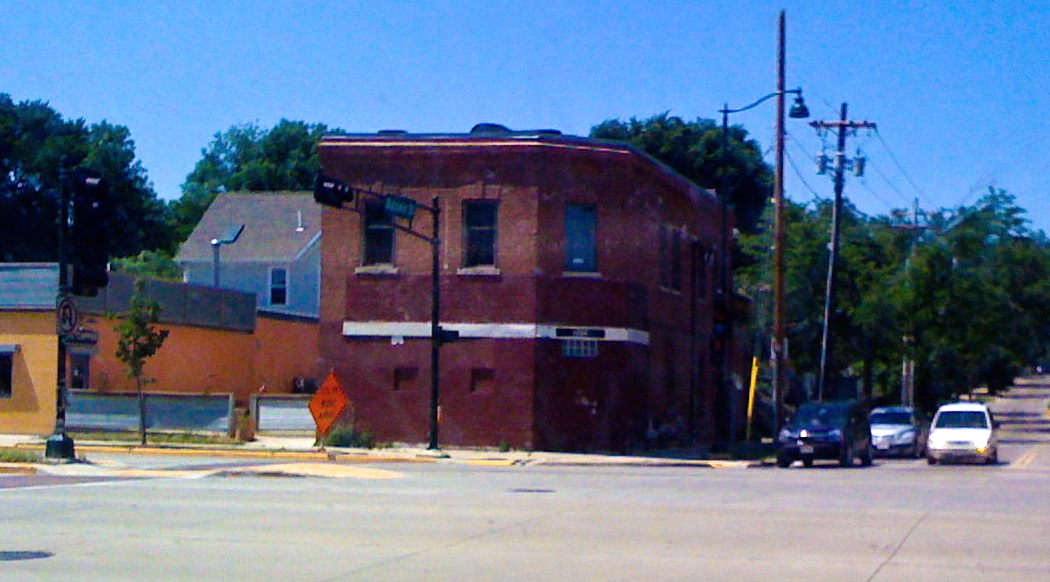
Smart Studios was established in 1983 by Vig and Marker, and was where Manson auditioned for the band

Duke Erikson and Butch Vig had been in several bands together, including Spooner and Fire Town (with Steve Marker as a sound engineer). In 1983, Vig and Marker founded Smart Studios in Madison and Vig's production work brought him to the attention of Sub Pop. Spooner reunited in 1990 and released another record, but disbanded in 1993 as Vig and Marker's career as producers took over. In 1994, as Vig had become "kind of burned out on doing really long records". He collaborated with Erikson and Marker by doing remixes for acts such as U2, Depeche Mode, Nine Inch Nails, and House of Pain. The remixes featured different instrumentation, and often highlighting new guitar hooks and bass grooves. This experience inspired the three men to form a band, where they "wanted to take that remix sensibility and somehow translate it into all of the possibilities of a band setup."

According to Vig, the team drew inspiration for its name from a hostile early comment, when a friend of the band heard recording material said, "This shit sounds like garbage!" However, according to This Is the Noise That Keeps Me Awake, an autobiography of the band, Vig wrote in his 1993 studio journal about the creative process; of working for long periods of time, "without coming up with anything cool... and when you least expect it, it all falls into place." The name derives from the last line of this entry: "I hope that all this garbage will become something beautiful!".

=== Early years and Manson joins (1994–1995) ===
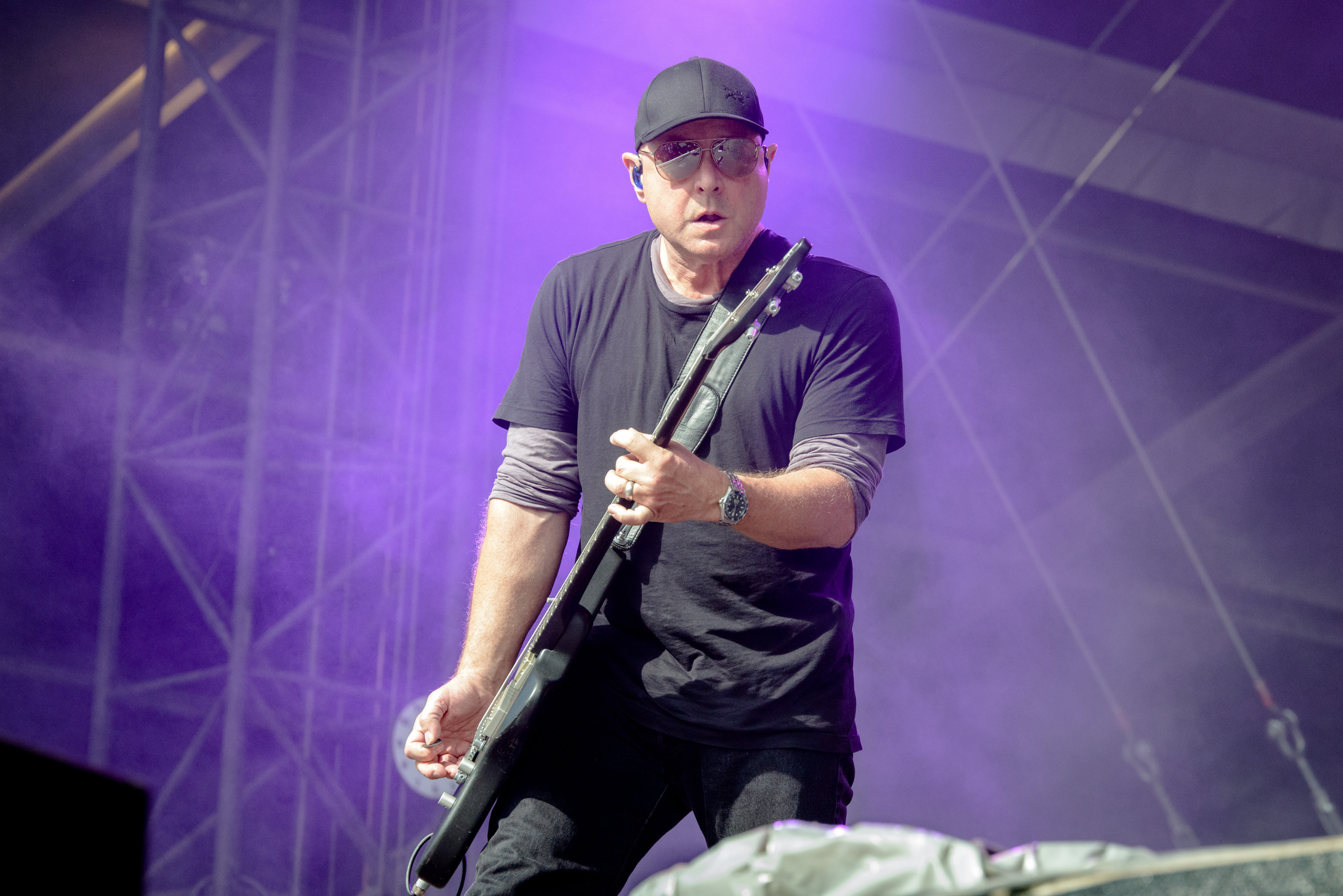
Steve Marker saw the music video for "Suffocate Me" by Manson's band Angelfish on MTV's 120 Minutes and invited her to record with Garbage

Initial sessions with Vig on vocals, along with the members' past work with all-male groups, led to the band's desire for a woman on lead. Vig declared that they wanted to find a female vocalist like "Debbie Harry, Patti Smith, Chrissie Hynde and Siouxsie Sioux—all really strong, unique personalities". Marker and Vig desired someone "who didn't have a high, chirpy, girly quality to her voice" and who could sing in an understated way, in contrast to "these alterna-rock singers [that] have a tendency to scream". Marker was watching 120 Minutes when he saw the music video for Scottish band Angelfish's "Suffocate Me", and had been watching 120 Minutes in order to seek a singer for the newly formed band by himself, Vig and Erikson. He showed the video to Erikson and Vig while their manager Shannon O'Shea tracked down the band's singer, Shirley Manson. When Manson was contacted, she did not know who Vig was and was urged to check the credits on Nevermind, the Nirvana album which Vig had produced.

On April 8, 1994, Manson met Erikson, Marker, and Vig for the first time in London. Later that evening Vig was informed of Nirvana frontman Kurt Cobain's suicide. Garbage was put on hold until Angelfish was finished touring North America in support of Live. Erikson, Marker, and Vig attended the Metro Chicago date, and Manson was invited to Madison to audition for the band. The audition did not go well, but Manson socialized with the men while there and they found they had a similar taste in music. Angelfish disbanded at the end of the Live tour. Manson called O'Shea and asked to audition again, feeling that "it could work out".

Manson described her first session with the band as "a disaster", as she had no experience as a session player, and she and the band were "two parties totally uncomfortable with the situation", but the "mutual disdain" from that meeting managed to pull the band together. Manson was granted a second chance by the band who were instantly impressed by her "quiet vocals" on the song "Queer". As a result, Manson relocated to Madison, Wisconsin from her hometown of Edinburgh to begin work on the band's debut album. The first songs were skeletal versions of the songs "Stupid Girl", "Queer" and "Vow", which led to some ad-libbed lyrics by Manson. Manson had never written a song prior to this session; nevertheless, this time she was invited to join the band. Lyrics were penned at a cabin in the north woods of Wisconsin while the songs were recorded at Smart Studios. Conscious of the grunge genre that had made their names, particularly Vig's, the band made every effort to avoid sounding similar, deliberately striving to make a pop record.

Garbage sent out demo tapes with no bio, to avoid a bidding war over Vig's production history. Garbage signed with Mushroom UK worldwide (excluding North America) and secured the band a Volume magazine compilation inclusion. The only potential candidate for release was "Vow", as it was the only song for which the band had completed production. When released in December, "Vow" began to receive radio airplay on XFM and from Radio 1 DJs Steve Lamacq, John Peel, and Johnnie Walker. Word-of-mouth on "Vow" took the track back to the US. On December 21, Garbage signed to Jerry Moss's label Almo Sounds for North America. Manson was licensed to both Mushroom and Almo by Radioactive Records for a single album, with no compensation from any of Garbage's labels.

Garbage had not considered "Vow" for inclusion on the album or even as a single. Because the exclusive licensing of Volume prevented a full commercial single release, on March 20, 1995, Mushroom issued "Vow" in a limited 7-inch vinyl format through Discordant, a label set up just to launch Garbage. By May, commercial alternative radio in the US had picked up on the track, and it began to receive heavy rotation nationwide. "Vow" debuted on Hot Modern Rock Tracks at No. 39. It climbed gradually over the following weeks, peaking at No. 26 in July. "Vow" bubbled under for two weeks before it spent two weeks on the Billboard Hot 100 staying at No. 97 both weeks.

=== Garbage and international breakthrough (1995–1997) ===
Garbage perform "Milk" at Rockpalast in Germany, 1996

On August 15, 1995, Garbage debuted on the Billboard 200 at No. 193. In the United Kingdom, its release was preceded by non-album track "Subhuman" and "Only Happy When It Rains" as singles to promote the album instead of "Queer". The album debuted on the UK album chart at No. 12. In Australia, the album debuted at No. 5. "Queer" was quickly released in the United Kingdom and Europe, while Garbage began their first tour. Garbage was nominated for Brit Awards for Best New Band and Best International Newcomer. Following the initial success of the album, Jim Merlis, the public relations manager at Geffen Records claimed that "Vig was the only member of this band that matters" as a result of his previous success as a record producer. Recollections of the meeting between both Manson and Merlis differ between the two, however, Merlis claims that he did not insinuate during the meeting that Vig would be needed to promote in order for the band to sell records. Following the meeting, Geffen Records concluded that the band appeared to "want the press campaign to go", and that they wish to be perceived "as a band, and not as a Butch Vig side project".

Following the release of Garbage, Manson's personality during interviews was highly praised, with Merlis claiming that she treats an interview "like a performance", acknowledging that in reality the press was not interested in Vig, but rather were equally interested in Manson. Initially projected as "three producers and a girl", the band were critical of this statement given each of their musical history in their respective bands prior to forming Garbage. Garbage had no plans to perform on stage, but once urged to play live during the recording of the music video for "Vow", they enjoyed the performance and decided to schedule a tour. The Garbage tour started in November 1995, and continued throughout 1996, with the band making their first public performance in Minneapolis with Daniel Shulman recruited by the band to play bass guitar. During the tour, Manson later recalled she "didn't feel like I belonged there" or that "anyone would take her seriously" which led her to feeling self conscious. Almo was considering cancelling the remainder of the Garbage tour after only four performances as they were not impressed by the band live, however, after convincing Almo to remain committed to the tour, the band's live performances throughout the tour began receiving critical acclaim.

Manson performing at the 1996 Osterfest Festival

"Only Happy When It Rains" was released as a single in North America; "Stupid Girl" was released to promote European dates. MTV announced that "Only Happy When It Rains" was certified a "Buzz clip", guaranteeing heavy rotation on its network from February 13. "Only Happy" peaked at No. 55 on the Hot 100. "Stupid Girl" received frequent video and radio airplay in the UK and peaked at No. 4, becoming the band's first top 10 hit on the UK Singles Chart and elevated the album to No. 6. In May, Garbage reworked "Milk" with Tricky in a Chicago recording studio before supporting Smashing Pumpkins on their arena tour until the overdose of Pumpkins keyboardist Jonathan Melvoin. "Stupid Girl" peaked at No. 24 on the Hot 100. Its Top 40 radio remix by Todd Terry received massive airplay. Garbage Video, a compilation of the album's promotional videos, was released in November 1996. Garbage was nominated for the Grammy Award for Best New Artist, while "Stupid Girl" received two nominations for Best Rock Song and Best Rock Performance By A Duo Or Group.

Worldwide, the final single release from the album was the reworked version of "Milk", which became the band's second UK top 10 hit. The band performed the song live at the MTV Europe Music Awards in London on November 14; Garbage won the Breakthrough award at the event. In North America, Almo Sounds released album track "Supervixen" to Modern Rock radio, while Mushroom Records released a remix of "#1 Crush" in March 1997 as a single from the soundtrack to Romeo + Juliet, which topped the Modern Rock Tracks chart for four weeks from the start of the year; the remix was also featured as the theme for the TV show Hex. "#1 Crush" was later nominated for Best Song From a Movie at the 1997 MTV Movie Awards.

=== Version 2.0 and continued popularity (1997–2000) ===
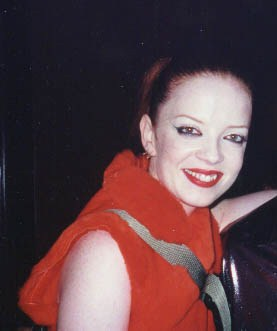
Lead singer Shirley Manson during the Version 2.0 era

Garbage relocated to Friday Harbor, Washington on March 1, 1997 to write songs for their second album. The band had "little hesitation" to begin work on a follow up album from their successful debut, with the bands chemistry said to have been "cemented" as a result of the intense touring schedule during 1995 and 1996 to promote Garbage. During these sessions, the band produced the beginnings for songs which would later become "Push It", "I Think I'm Paranoid", "Hammering In My Head", "When I Grow Up" and "Wicked Ways". Returning to Smart Studios a short while later, the band found themselves under intense pressure to repeat the success of Garbage. The band decided not to change their formula, but progress musically by pushing their sound as far as it could go—hence the album's eventual title Version 2.0, which was completed by February 15, 1998. In March, the first single "Push It" became the No. 1 most added record at the UK Alternative Radio. It became their third consecutive UK top ten hit at No. 9.

Anticipation for the release of the album was high, and in May 1998, Version 2.0 debuted at No. 1 in the UK and at No. 13 in the Billboard 200. Anticipation was so great that the band had been asked to be the musical guests on Saturday Night Live before the official release of the album. Garbage rejected, with Erikson claiming that the "band were not ready", claiming that "the performance on Saturday Night Live would hurt more than giving no performance at all". Garbage began touring Version 2.0 that month, a tour which lasted until the end of 1999. "I Think I'm Paranoid" was released worldwide in July, while the music video for "Push It" received eight nominations at the 1998 MTV Video Music Awards. By October 12, "Special" was released and Garbage was nominated for three MTV Europe Music Awards: "Best Group", "Best Rock Act" and "Best Video" for "Push It". Given the success of Version 2.0 and the band themselves, they recruited a "more experienced management team" on the advice of Jerry Moss and Paul Kremen from Almo Sounds and also renegotiated their contract terms with Mushroom Records, whose general manager, Gary Ashley, who initially signed the band, had since left. Their initial contract included a "key man" clause which, if interpreted to be Gary Ashley, could give the band the option to terminate the agreement. However, the owner of Mushroom Records, Michael Gudinski, deemed Garbage "too important" for the label, and successfully prevented Virgin Records from signing the band.

Garbage performing "I Think I'm Paranoid" on TFI Friday, 1998

In early 1999, Version 2.0 received two Grammy Award nominations for Album of the Year and Best Rock Album "Special" was No. 1 most added single at the Top 40 radio. In Europe, Garbage began their biggest headline tour, releasing singles for "When I Grow Up" and "The Trick Is to Keep Breathing". In April, "When I Grow Up" was released to Modern Rock radio. "When I Grow Up" was then featured on the movie Big Daddy. Version 2.0 was awarded the European Platinum Award by the International Federation of the Phonographic Industry for one million sales across Europe and the United States. "You Look So Fine" was released as the final single from Version 2.0 worldwide, as Garbage toured Europe, including headlining in Edinburgh to mark the opening of the Scottish Parliament.

On August 4, Garbage was contracted to perform the theme for the James Bond film The World Is Not Enough and worked with composer David Arnold in London and Vancouver. Garbage co-headlined an Australian tour with Alanis Morissette, while "When I Grow Up" spent three months in the Australian chart, becoming the band's most successful single there. "The World Is Not Enough" reached the top 10s in Italy, Latvia, Lithuania, Norway and Finland, as well as the top 40 in Germany, Austria, Switzerland and the United Kingdom. "Special" received Grammy nominations for Best Rock Song and for Best Rock Performance by a Duo or Group, while "When I Grow Up" was re-issued in Europe.

=== Beautiful Garbage (2001–2002) ===
Shirley Manson interview from 2001, around the release of Beautiful Garbage

Garbage regrouped on April 10, 2001. The group began work on their third record, and put aside plans for a B-sides album due to the sale of Almo Sounds to the UMG. Manson ran an online blog throughout the recording of the album named Beautiful Garbage. During the recording of the album, Garbage invoked a provision of its contract to leave Almo, and sued UMG when it refused to terminate the contract. UMG threatened to use Manson's 1993 solo contract to tie Garbage to the label. The suit was settled on July 29, 2001, and Garbage moved to Interscope. Lead single "Androgyny" was released to radio by the end of August, and its video was released on September 10. The following day, due to the September 11 attacks in New York City and Washington D.C., the promotion schedule for the album was put on hold.

Released three weeks after the September 11 attacks, the album suffered from lack of promotion, mixed reaction from critics and fans alike, and the failure of its lead single "Androgyny" to achieve high chart positions. "Androgyny" was later described as "the wrong song for the moment", largely in part due to its "upbeat nature" and radio stations "not knowing what to do" with such an upbeat song. During recording an episode of Top of the Pops, Korda Marshall from Mushroom Records claimed that "we cannot get "Androgyny" played on any radio station" and advised the band that they had no alternative available. Manson recalled that the band "had never had a problem getting airplay in the United Kingdom before" and given the success of Version 2.0 had "no reason to believe that we would meet such sudden resistance". Despite faltering in major markets, Beautiful Garbage debuted at number one on Billboard's Top Electronic Albums chart where it stayed for eight weeks, topped the album charts in Australia, and was named one of Rolling Stone's "Top 10 Albums of the Year".

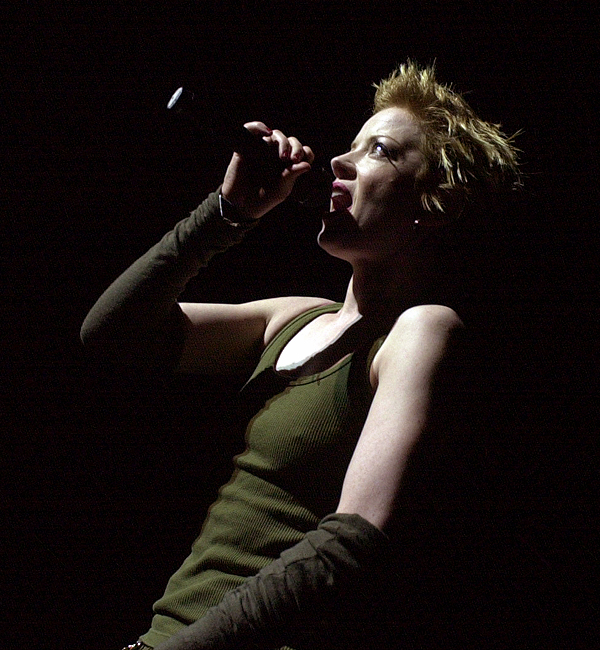
Shirley Manson performing live at Voodoo Festival, 2002

In October, Beautiful Garbage achieved a No. 13 debut on the Billboard 200, reached number six on the Top Internet Albums chart, and topped the Electronic Albums chart for seven weeks. In its first three months on sale, Beautiful Garbage sold 1.2 million copies. Garbage supported U2 on the third leg of their Elevation Tour. After the last show, Vig contracted Hepatitis A and was replaced by Matt Chamberlain for European dates. In December "Breaking Up the Girl" was released as a single. On December 27, Rolling Stone's United States and Australian editions named Beautiful Garbage as one of their critics "Top 10 Albums of the Year".

"Cherry Lips" was released at the end of 2001, becoming a massive hit in Australia, peaking at number seven on the ARIA Charts, and number eleven in the highly influential Triple J Hottest 100, 2001. Sony Music Japan released an exclusive E.P. of rare tracks titled Special Collection. Following the release of Beautiful Garbage, the band were dropped by their record label, Interscope, with Manson feeling as if the band "was finished". Manson claimed that the band had been told by Interscope that there "was no room for the record company to promote more than one female rock band" and ultimately they decided to progress with No Doubt fronted by Gwen Stefani rather than Garbage. Manson worried that her career was over following the band being dropped by the label, claiming that "I was 40 at the time, and I was thinking 'no woman in alt rock has got out of this situation with her career intact'. I really believed my career was over". Manson and the band ultimately felt that Interscope had been trying to turn the band into a pop–style oriented band, something which Garbage were ultimately against.

=== Bleed Like Me, hiatus and Absolute Garbage (2003–2007) ===
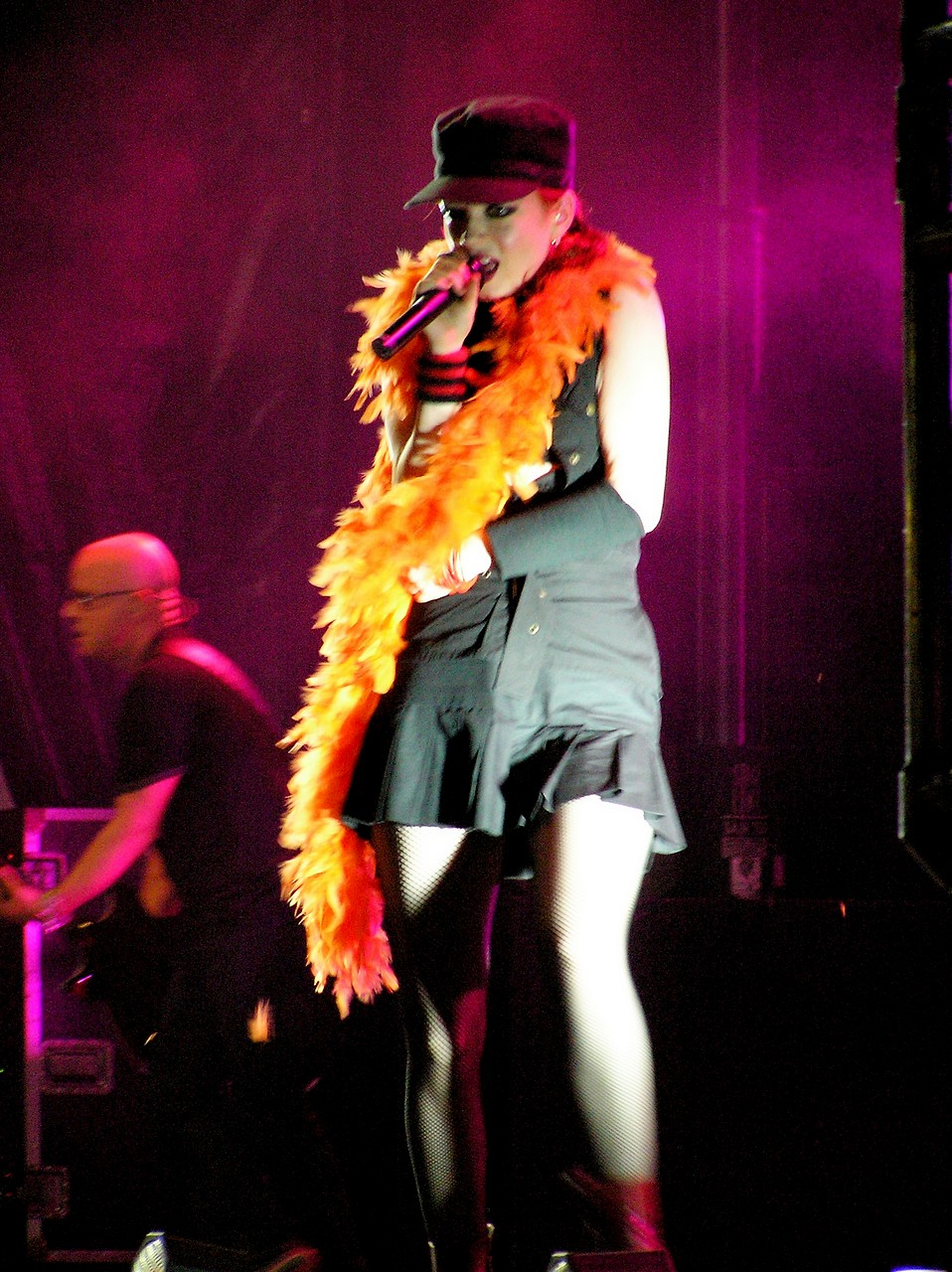
Shirley Manson and Steve Marker in 2005 during the Bleed Like Me tour

Garbage started proper work on their fourth record in March 2003, writing "Right Between the Eyes" in 30 minutes. It was a false start. Recording was halted during the summer when Manson underwent surgery on her right vocal cord and was not given the okay to sing again until August. By October, due to rising tension within the band and a breakdown in communication, Vig relocated to Los Angeles while Manson returned to Scotland. During the Christmas period, Vig decided to give the band another chance, having met excited fans eager to hear how the album was going. In January 2004 Garbage reconvened in Los Angeles with Dust Brothers' John King, drummer Matt Chamberlain, bassist Justin Meldal-Johnsen, and on February 6, Dave Grohl performed drums on "Bad Boyfriend". His performance was regarded by the band as "raising the bar" for the record. Following the John King sessions, the band formally relocated to Los Angeles and wrote "Metal Heart" and "Boys Wanna Fight", both more energetic than they had been writing and lyrically more "overtly political"; both songs referenced the United States and the United Kingdom-led 2003 invasion of Iraq.

In 2005, lead single "Why Do You Love Me" debuted on the Modern Rock Tracks chart at No. 39. as well as No. 97 and No. 81 on the Billboard Hot 100 and Pop 100 charts respectively, becoming the band's most successful single for six years. Their fourth album, Bleed Like Me, entered Top 10 in the US. On August 25, 2005 Garbage cancelled their scheduled October tour dates in France, Belgium and the United Kingdom. They released a statement that the band had "somewhat overextended themselves" and decided to conclude their tour in Australia on October 1. Ahead of the Australian tour, "Sex Is Not The Enemy" was released to Australian radio. The end of the tour marked the end of active promotion for Bleed Like Me. The band confirmed that they were going "on indefinite hiatus" to dispel reports of a split. "We were barely even speaking," Manson later admitted. "We didn't want to talk to anyone outside of the band about the problems we were having with our career, so of course it turned into this whole passive-aggressive thing between us. I just wanted to get the fuck out of there and go home."

Garbage ended their 18-month hiatus on January 31, 2007, at a benefit show in Glendale, California, organised by Vig to help pay musician Wally Ingram's medical care following treatment for throat cancer. Prior to this, Garbage had been sharing song ideas via the internet and were keen on getting into the recording studio to complete them. Garbage began work on the new songs in earnest during February and March at Vig's home studio, completing four tracks including "Tell Me Where It Hurts", which was released as the album's lead single.

Absolute Garbage was released in July, remastered and including a special edition bonus remix package. The release of Absolute Garbage concluded their recording contracts with Almo Sounds, Geffen and the Interscope/Universal deal (Universal Music Enterprises) in the United States, and with Warner Bros. and A&E Records in the United Kingdom and Australia. A DVD format rounded out the package; among the fifteen Garbage music videos included was a documentary film titled "Thanks For Your, Uhhh Support" featuring backstage and behind-the-scenes footage, live performances and interviews. A Garbage track called "Witness to Your Love" was released on a charity, "limited availability", compilation in the US. The release was available from Urban Outfitters from Wednesday, October 15, 2008, to Thursday, January 31, 2009, and went on radio in the US on October 17.

=== Return and Not Your Kind of People (2010–2015) ===
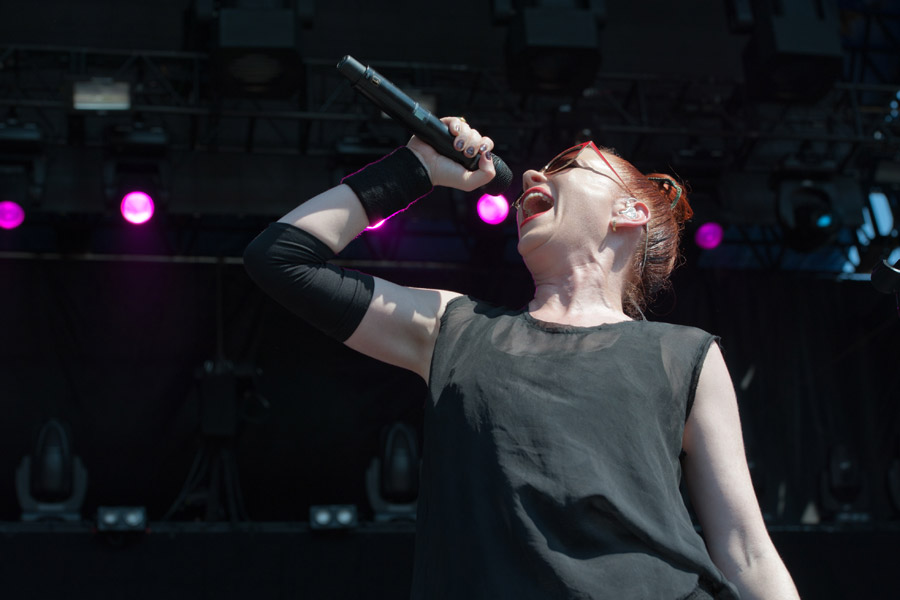
Garbage perform at the Music Midtown in Atlanta, September 2012

On February 1, 2010, it was confirmed through Shirley Manson's official Facebook profile that she spent a week in the studio with her bandmates. In the post, Manson wrote "Guess who I just spent a week in the studio with? Would you be pleased if I said one of them was called Steve and one of them was called Duke and another was a Grammy-winning producer?" In October 2010, it was officially confirmed that Garbage were recording their fifth studio album. In an interview with Jason Tanamor, Duke stated in regard to the band reuniting after seven years, "It's kind of amazing we all happen to be in the right place at the same time. I don't know. The stars were aligned or something. It was quite coincidental we were all on the same page and ready to give it another go."

On September 17, 2011, the band clarified that their forthcoming 11-track LP would be mixed by October 17, while another 12 songs would be finalized by the end of the year and see release as "b-sides, extra tracks and maybe one might even come your way simply as a Christmas present from Garbage as a thank you to you all for sticking around," though this did not materialize.

The band announced to Billboard that their fifth studio album would be released independently of any major label support. On January 6, 2012, the band announced that they had entered Red Razor Studios in Glendale, California to record bonus material for their forthcoming album, later confirming on Twitter that a further five tracks were being worked on, including the new title "What Girls Are Made Of". Not Your Kind of People was released on May 14, 2012, to generally positive reviews. The album reached number 13 on the Billboard 200, and number 10 on the UK Albums Chart. The band supported the album with the year-long Not Your Kind of People World Tour. The song "Not Your Kind of People" was used in a trailer for the video game, Metal Gear Solid V: The Phantom Pain.

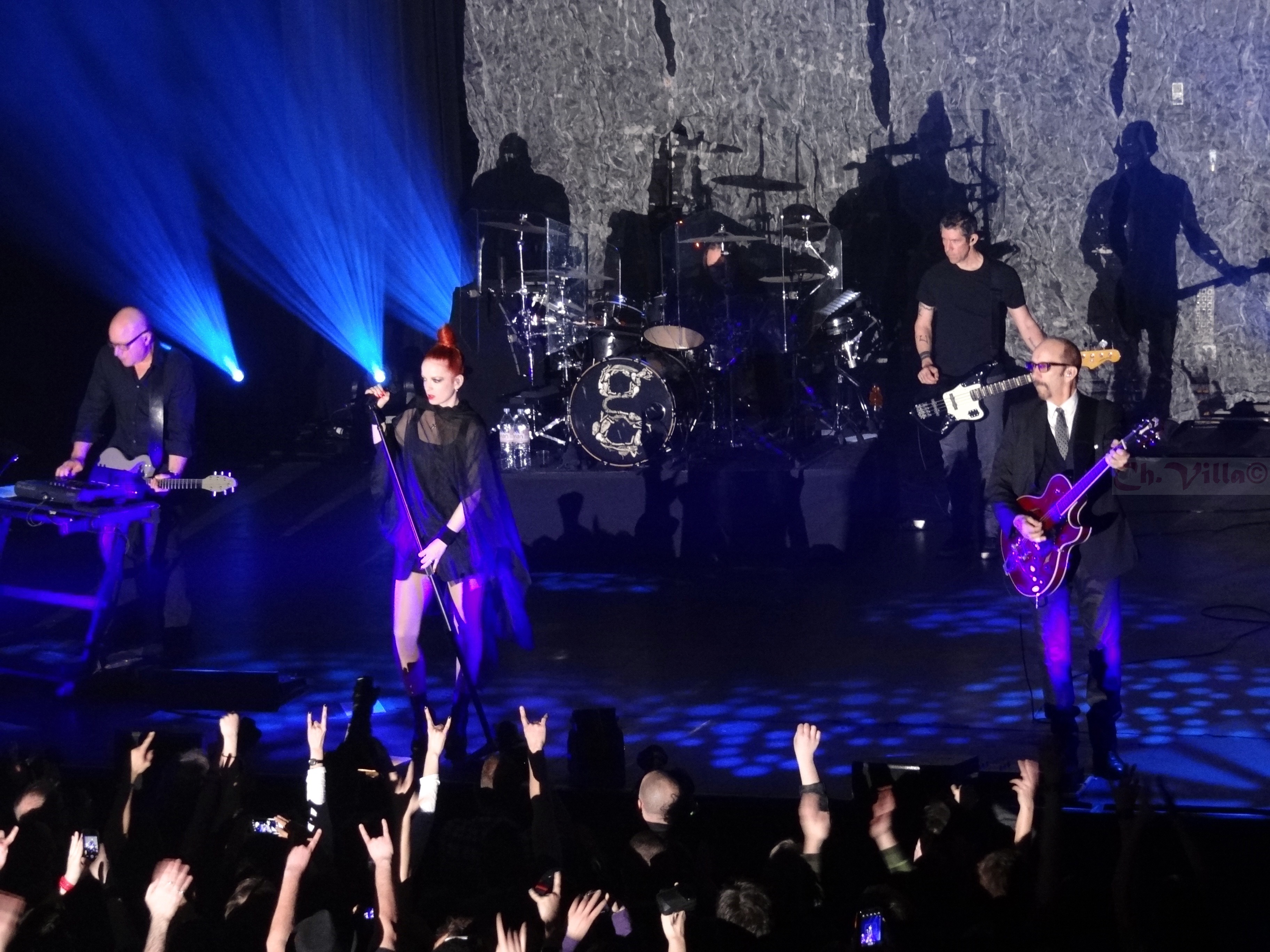
Garbage performing during their Not Your Kind of People tour in March 2013

Garbage and Screaming Females recorded a cover of "Because the Night" for Record Store Day 2013. They released a video directed by Sophie Muller. The band released their first live DVD, One Mile High... Live, in May 2013. Shirley Manson confirmed that they would release two new songs for Record Store Day on April 19, 2014. "Girls Talk", an out-take from the Absolute Garbage sessions, was re-recorded to include vocals from Brody Dalle, and was backed by an out-take from the Not Your Kind of People sessions, "Time Will Destroy Everything".

In 2014, Manson confirmed that the band is working on a book, and noted that the next record would be her "romance novel". On January 23, 2015, Garbage confirmed on their Facebook page that they completed two new songs for Record Store Day 2015; "The Chemicals", which features vocals from Brian Aubert of Silversun Pickups, was released on April 18, 2015. The band played the Pa'l Norte Rock Festival in Monterrey, Mexico, on April 25, 2015.

On October 2, 2015, the band released the Deluxe Edition of their debut album, in commemoration of the 20th anniversary of the album. The album was remastered from the original tapes, and all b-sides (called G-sides on the album), were included. During the 20 Years Queer tour, Vig announced that mixing of the new album would be finished by February 1, 2016, and that it would be promoted by a world tour beginning in the summer.

=== Strange Little Birds and 20 Years Paranoid tour (2016–2021) ===
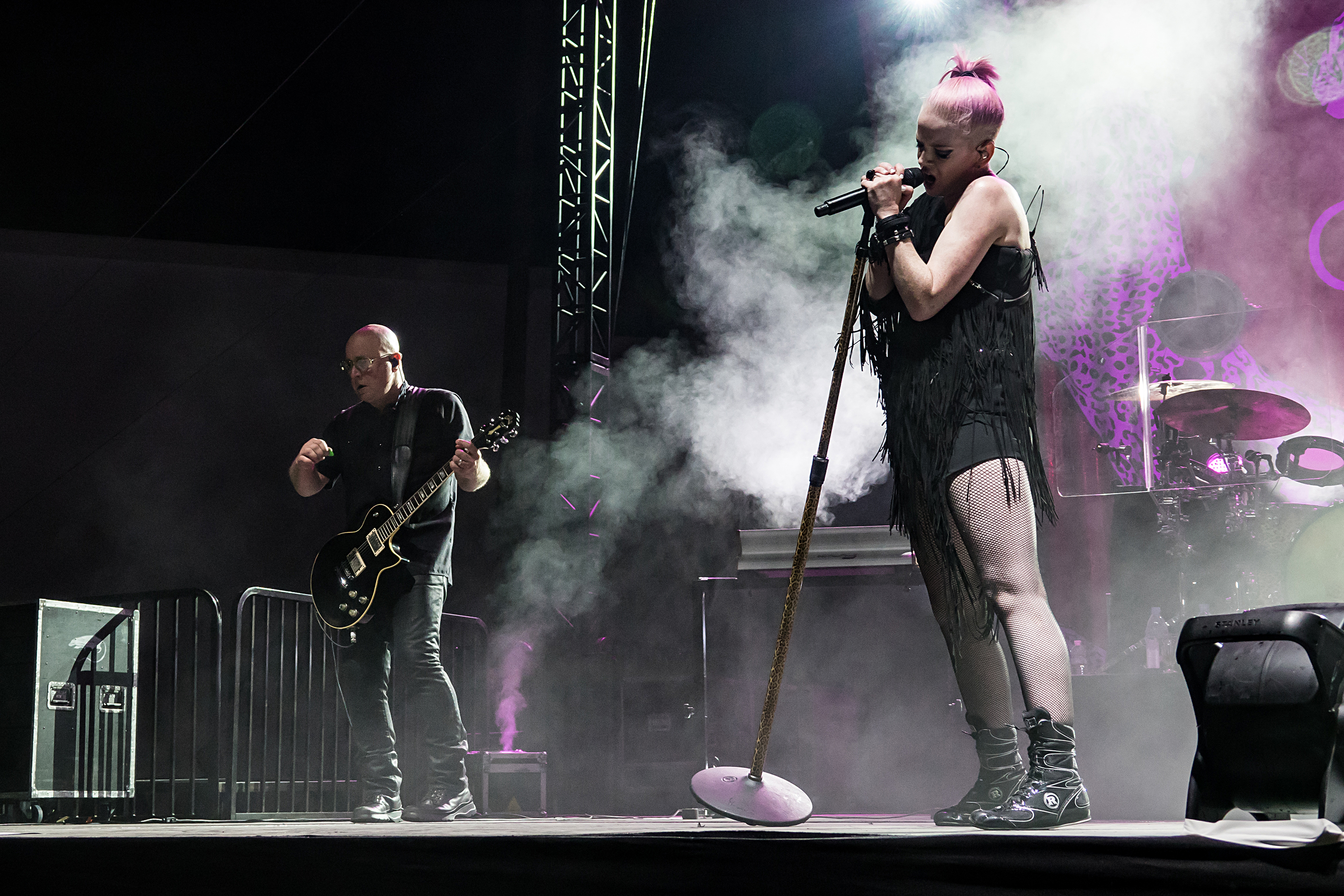
Garbage performing in Los Angeles, 2016

On February 6, 2016 Garbage stated on their Facebook page that mixing was almost done: "Our new record is an inch away, just an inch away from being done. And I do mean an inch away from being completely done. Recorded. Mixed. And soon to be mastered." Vig also confirmed the title of a new song, "Even Though Our Love is Doomed". Three days later, Garbage announced that they had completed the album. Strange Little Birds, the band's sixth studio album, was released on June 10, 2016.

Writing and recording for Strange Little Birds took over two years, starting in early 2013. Garbage recorded over twenty tracks during the sessions. The band recorded the album in Vig's basement and at engineer Billy Bush's Red Razor Sounds studio in Los Angeles. Vig stated, "we mixed it so it's kind of confessional, almost confrontational. On a lot of songs, Shirley's voice sounds really loud, in your face, and really dry. There are not a lot of effects. There are some moments on the record that get really huge, but a lot of it is really intimate." Two of the songs written during the sessions, "The Chemicals" and "On Fire", were given a vinyl release on Record Store Day the previous year.

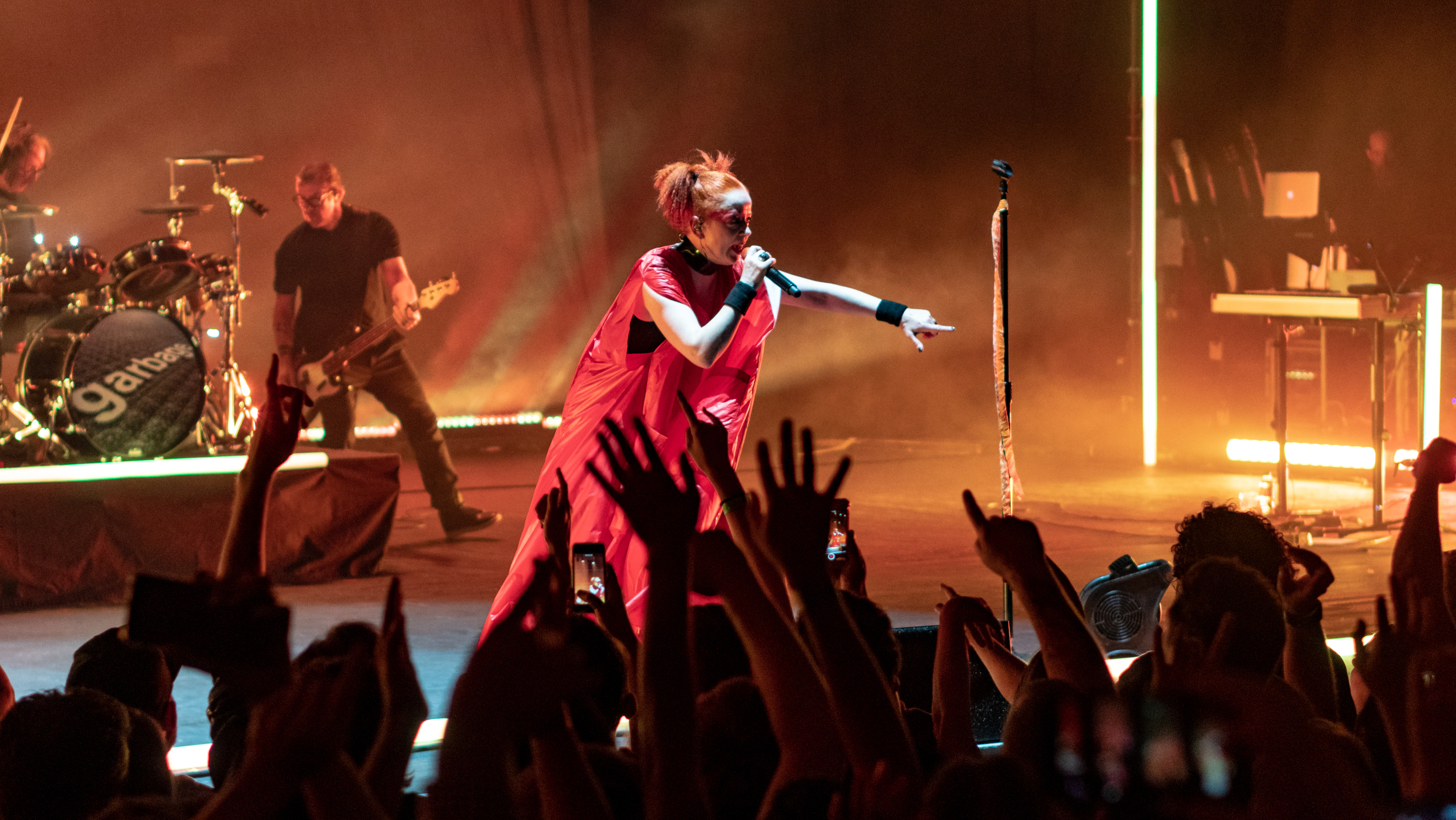
Garbage during the 20 Years Paranoid tour, 2018

In 2017, Garbage recorded and released a standalone digital single titled "No Horses", which the band hinted could be the direction their new material would sound. Writing for Garbage's seventh album began in April 2018, following some preliminary work at Butch Vig's home studio, the band set up space in Palm Springs to write demos. The quartet sketched out the skeleton of the album over two weeks, jamming, experimenting and feeling the songs out. Work was paused in the latter half of 2018, as Garbage marked the twentieth anniversary of their second album Version 2.0 (1998) with the two-month 20 Years Paranoid tour, before reconvening in Los Angeles to finish the project.

The band announced that in May 2018 the band would release a 20th anniversary edition of their second album Version 2.0 in a similar fashion to the 20th anniversary edition of their self-titled debut album. The anniversary edition would also see Garbage commit to touring for this celebration which took place towards the end of 2018. As of March 2018, Garbage had also been working on a new studio album which, according to Shirley Manson, was due for a 2020 release.

=== No Gods No Masters and Anthology (2021–2024) ===
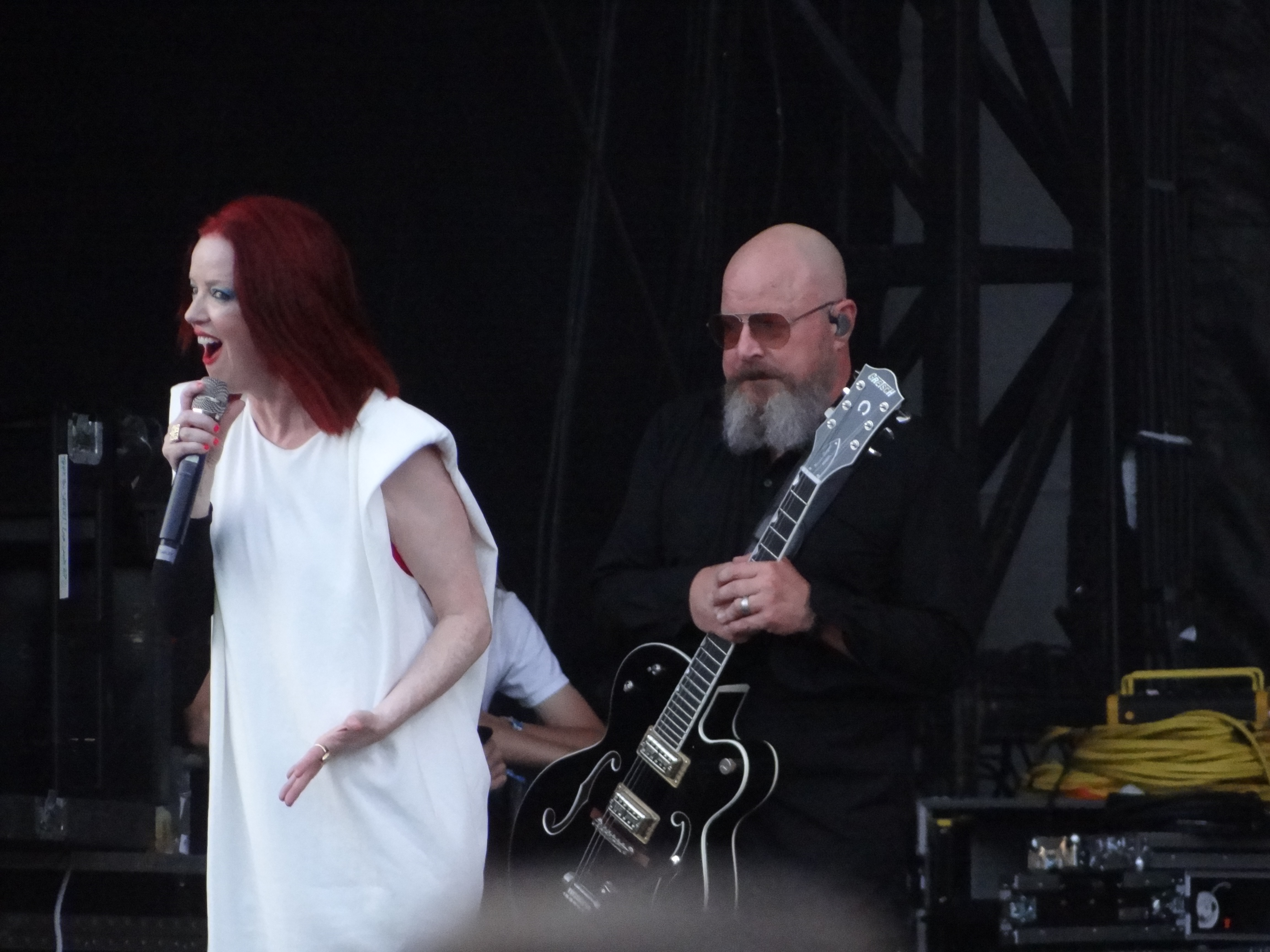
Shirley Manson and Steve Marker at the Shaky Knees Festival, 2021

On March 30, 2021, Garbage released the song "The Men Who Rule the World", the lead single from their seventh studio album, No Gods No Masters, which was released on June 11, 2021. On April 28, the album's title track "No Gods No Masters" was released as the second single, followed by "Wolves" on May 19. No Gods No Masters was supported in summer 2021 with an arena concert tour with Garbage as guests of Alanis Morissette. The tour went on to become the most successful female-fronted tour of the year, selling more than 500,000 tickets. In August 2021, Garbage announced that they would release a 20th anniversary edition of their third studio album, Beautiful Garbage, which was originally released in 2001. This follows previous reissued anniversary editions of Garbage (1995, reissued in 2015) and Version 2.0 (1998, reissued in 2018). The reissue features a previously unheard version of the album's lead single "Androgyny", with Manson explaining, "We wanted to celebrate the release of our third album in the same manner as we have celebrated the 20th anniversaries of our previous two records, as we cherish this third child of ours just as much as its predecessors". The reissued version of Beautiful Garbage was released on November 5, 2021.

On October 20, a 10-date UK Tour by Blondie featuring Garbage as special guest was announced for November. However, the tour was later postponed to spring 2022, featuring Johnny Marr instead of Garbage as special guest due to scheduling conflicts. In May 2022, Garbage joined Tears for Fears for the 21-date United States wing of The Tipping Point World Tour as special guest. In summer, Garbage toured the United States and Canada with Alanis Morissette for 10 dates of her Jagged Little Pill 25th anniversary tour. On April 14, Garbage announced a 7-date United States headline tour at the end of June supported by Glass Battles. However, the last four dates of the tour were cancelled due to illness in the band.

On September 7, 2022, Garbage announced their third greatest hits album Anthology, released on October 28. The compilation features 35 newly remastered tracks celebrating three decades of career, including "Witness To Your Love", which was released as single. On October 4, Garbage performed "The World Is Not Enough" at the Royal Albert Hall in London with the Royal Philharmonic Orchestra as part of The Sound of 007: Live at the Royal Albert Hall curated by David Arnold, marking the 60th anniversary of the Bond franchise. The event was made available for streaming on Prime Video on October 5. A documentary by Matt Whitecross titled The Sound of 007 featuring an interview with Garbage premiered on Prime Video the same day. Prior to the event, the 2022 remaster of "The World Is Not Enough" was released as digital single. On October 22, Garbage performed at Audacy's 9th annual We Can Survive at the Hollywood Bowl in Los Angeles.

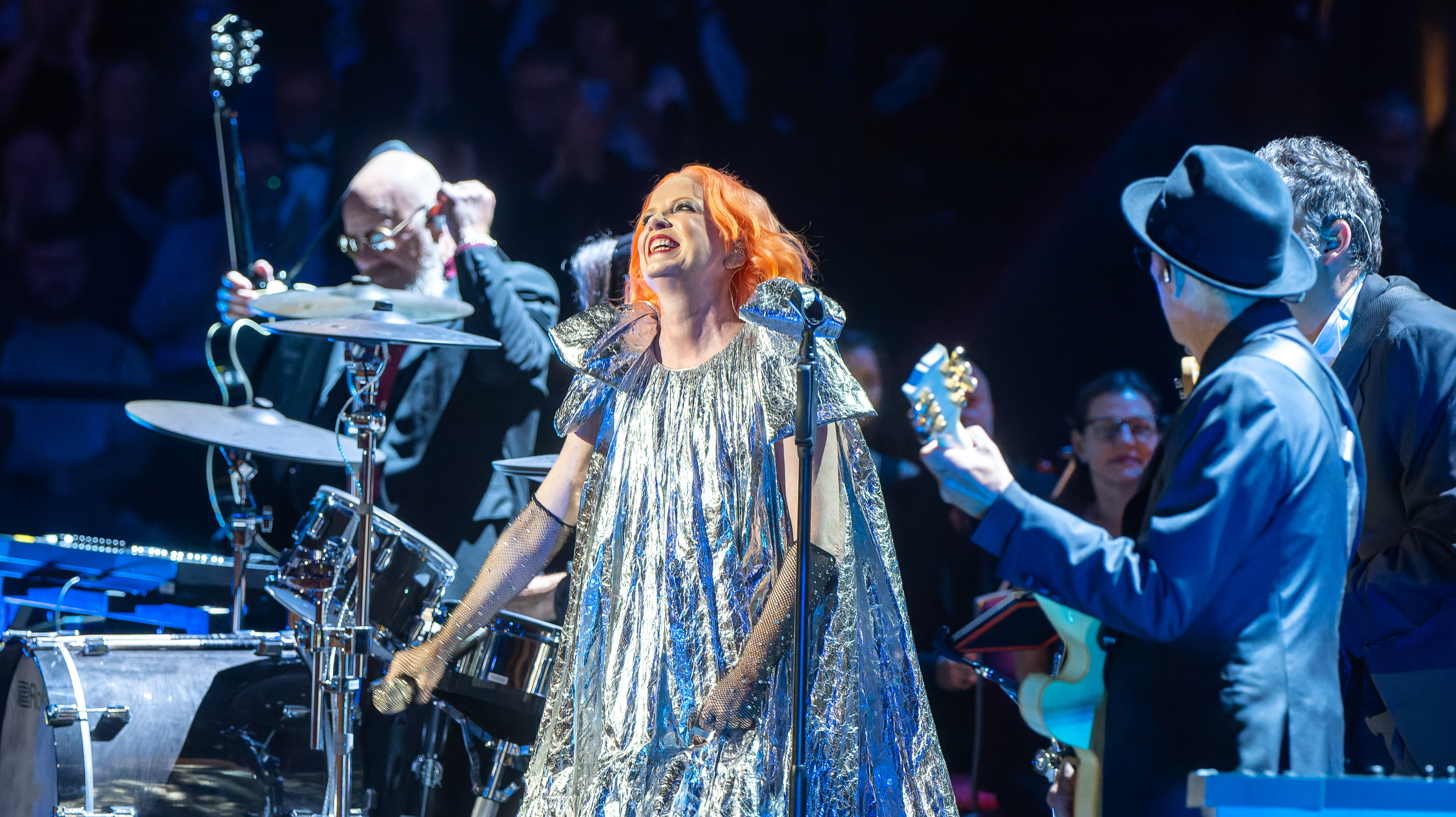
Garbage performing during The Sound of 007 concert at the Royal Albert Hall, London, October 2022

Early in 2022, Garbage started writing for their upcoming eighth studio album. In October, after fulfilling their touring obligations, Garbage resumed writing for the album. In February 2023, Garbage announced their Summer 2023 co-headline North American tour with Noel Gallagher's High Flying Birds featuring Metric as special guests. On April 22, 2023 Garbage released the four-song 12" Witness to Your Love EP as a vinyl exclusive Record Store Day release featuring "Witness to Your Love" backed by an unreleased cover of "Cities in Dust", originally by Siouxsie and the Banshees, and two outtakes from the No Gods No Masters sessions, "Blue Betty" and "Adam and Eve".

In May 2023, longtime touring and recording bass guitarist Eric Avery left the band to rejoin Jane's Addiction. Regarding his departure, Manson posted: "We are all genuinely happy for Eric as this course of action, this band of his, is where his heart lies and always has. Unfortunately for us it is an enormous, immeasurable loss. He has always been such a joy to work with. We will all miss him more than I have the words to express." Avery was replaced by a returning Daniel Shulman, marking his first time playing with the band since 2005.

=== Let All That We Imagine Be the Light (2024–present) ===
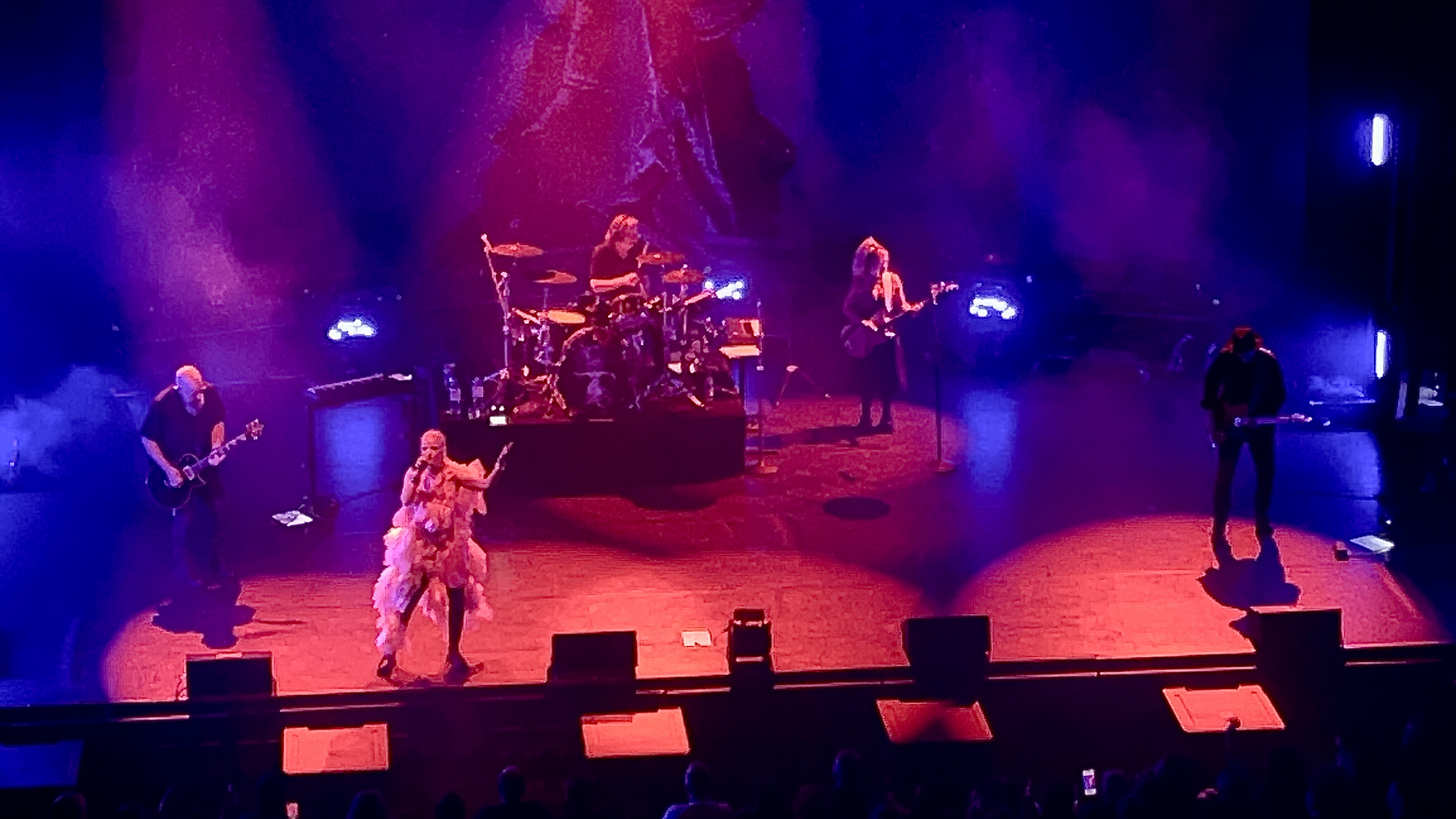
Garbage performing at the Usher Hall in Edinburgh, Scotland on 14 July 2024. For their 2024 European tour, Ginger Pooley joined as a touring bassist.

On 4 March 2024, Garbage announced a European tour, marking their first tour in five years in continental Europe. The headlining tour includes dates in Germany, Italy, France, Denmark, as well as a date at the Wembley Arena in England. Two dates were confirmed in Manson's native Scotland – a main stage slot at the TRNSMT festival in Glasgow, and a date at the Usher Hall in Edinburgh. The band was joined by Ginger Pooley on bass and backing vocals, marking the first time that another female musician would perform with the band on tour and also that someone would sing backing vocals. Following the commencement of the tour, the band announced three festival dates in North America at the Festival Hera HSBC in Mexico City on August 24, HFStival in Washington D.C. on September 21, and Ohana Festival in Dana Point, California on September 27, before mixing and mastering their eighth studio album.

In April 2024, the band re-released their 2005 album Bleed Like Me. For the release, the album was remastered and packaged in formats including a 2 CD release with a selection of B-sides, remixes and demos from the recording sessions for Bleed Like Me featured on the second disc, a 2 LP red vinyl edition which includes ten B-sides and bonus tracks on LP number two, and a silver single vinyl LP with just the remastered album available. This marks the first time that Bleed Like Me was issued on vinyl, as it was not pressed on vinyl for its original release in 2005. On April 22, the four-track Lie to Me EP was released. It contains two outtakes from the Bleed Like Me sessions, a cover of "Song to the Siren" and a remix of "Bad Boyfriend".

In June, the band announced they had finished recording their upcoming eighth studio album slated for a release in 2025. Speaking ahead of the TRNSMT Festival at Glasgow Green in Scotland, on 12 July 2024 during an interview with BBC Scotland, Manson claimed that she "didn't know how long Garbage has left", claiming "the older I get the more I enjoy life". She also referred to the future of Garbage, stating "I am the youngest member of the band and I'm turning 58 in a couple of weeks. So we are just enjoying every moment right now". On November 29, the band released their first cover collection, Copy/Paste, as a Record Store Day Black Friday exclusive. The compilation album includes ten classic songs covered by Garbage over the course of almost thirty years.

On February 27, 2025, the band announced their eighth studio album, Let All That We Imagine Be the Light, which was released on May 30. Earlier that month, Garbage announced former Smashing Pumpkins bassist Nicole Fiorentino as their new touring bassist, replacing Ginger Pooley. The band embarked on a North American tour in support of the album, beginning in September 2025. Garbage also performed "There's No Future in Optimism" on Jimmy Kimmel Live on June 4.

== Musical style ==
"Only Happy When It Rains"
Sample of "Only Happy When It Rains", the band's breakthrough single from their debut album Garbage (1995).

Garbage's musical style has been described as alternative rock, electronic rock, electropop, trip hop, post-grunge, industrial rock, dance-rock, grunge, and hard rock. Garbage's intention is to make pop-like songs which mix a variety of genres, with Steve Marker saying that the band wanted to "take pop music and make it as horrible sounding as we can." These genres include trip hop, grunge, 1980s rock music, techno, power pop, and shoegaze. Shirley Manson has stated that the band itself "used to describe [their sound] as sci-fi pop, because we felt it was taking a futuristic approach." Vig has said the crossover-heavy sound was inspired by the band's background with remixes, where songs would be rearranged to every musical style to which they held interest, and also that he "grew up listening to everything from pop radio and opera to country music and polka, so I really thought that Garbage would be an interesting and eclectic thing to do." Lindsay Zoladz of Pitchfork notes Garbage prevailed in the glory days of alternative rock "probably because their sound was a hectic amalgamation of almost everything that mingled on the format's airwaves: electronica, punk, industrial rock, grunge, and the occasional trip-hop". Likewise, Vice wrote that from their singular concoctions of styles like trip hop, grunge, rock, techno, and shoegaze, Garbage "has forged a kind of queasy originality" in the search of "a kind of perverse beauty".

Garbage has been inspired by The Velvet Underground, Iggy & The Stooges, T. Rex, Roxy Music, The Pretenders, Siouxsie and the Banshees, Blondie, Cocteau Twins, Patti Smith, The Smashing Pumpkins and David Bowie.

== Members ==
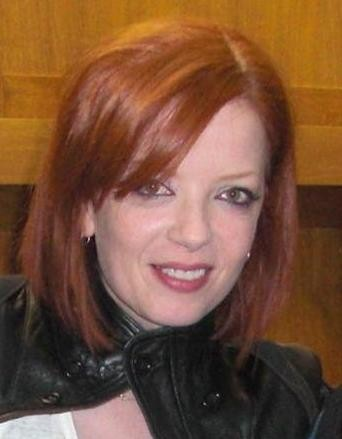
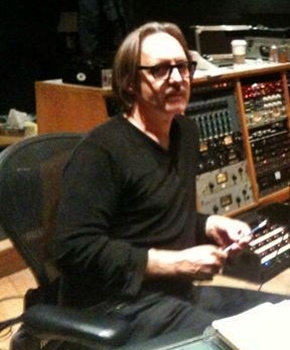
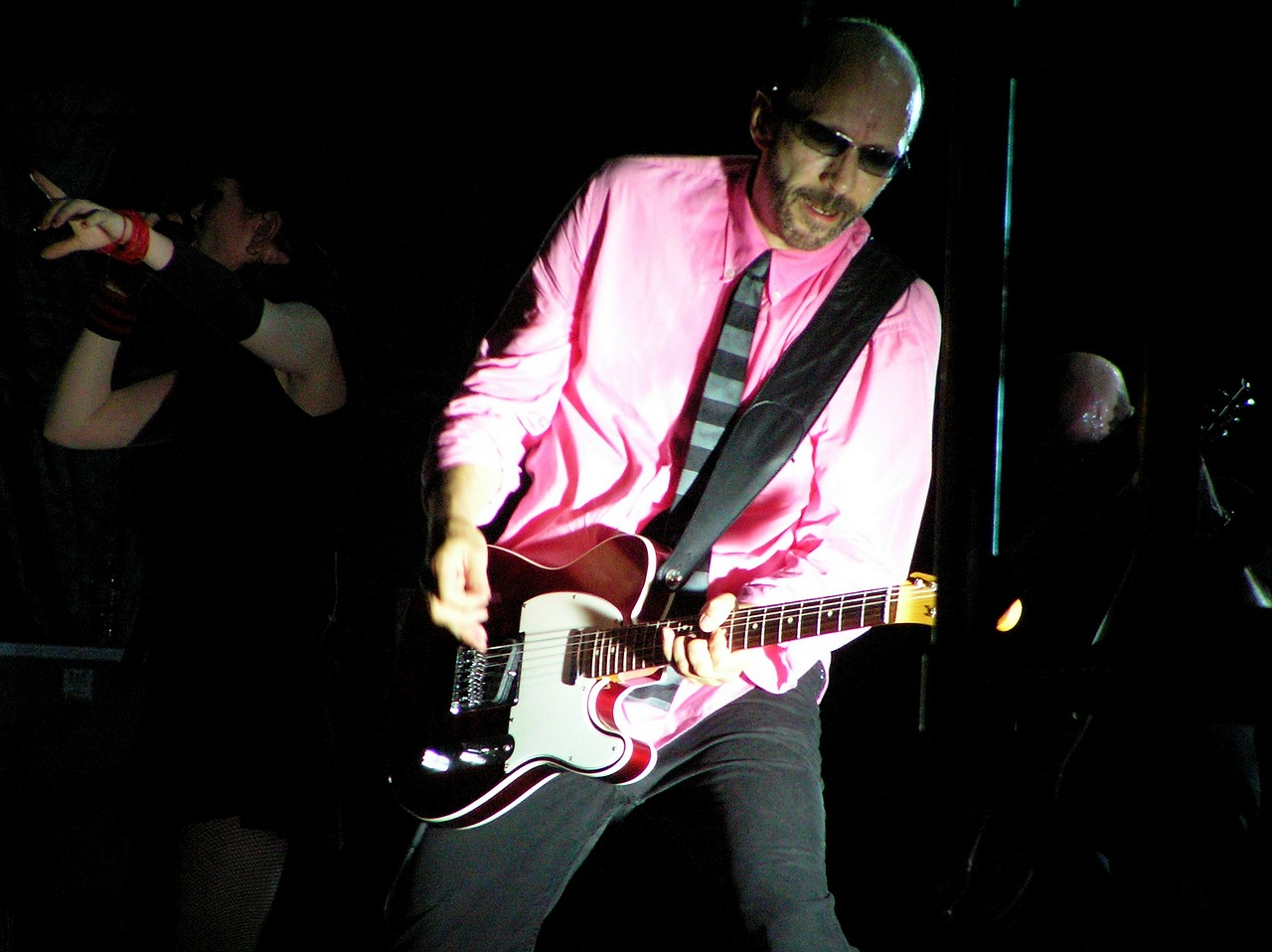
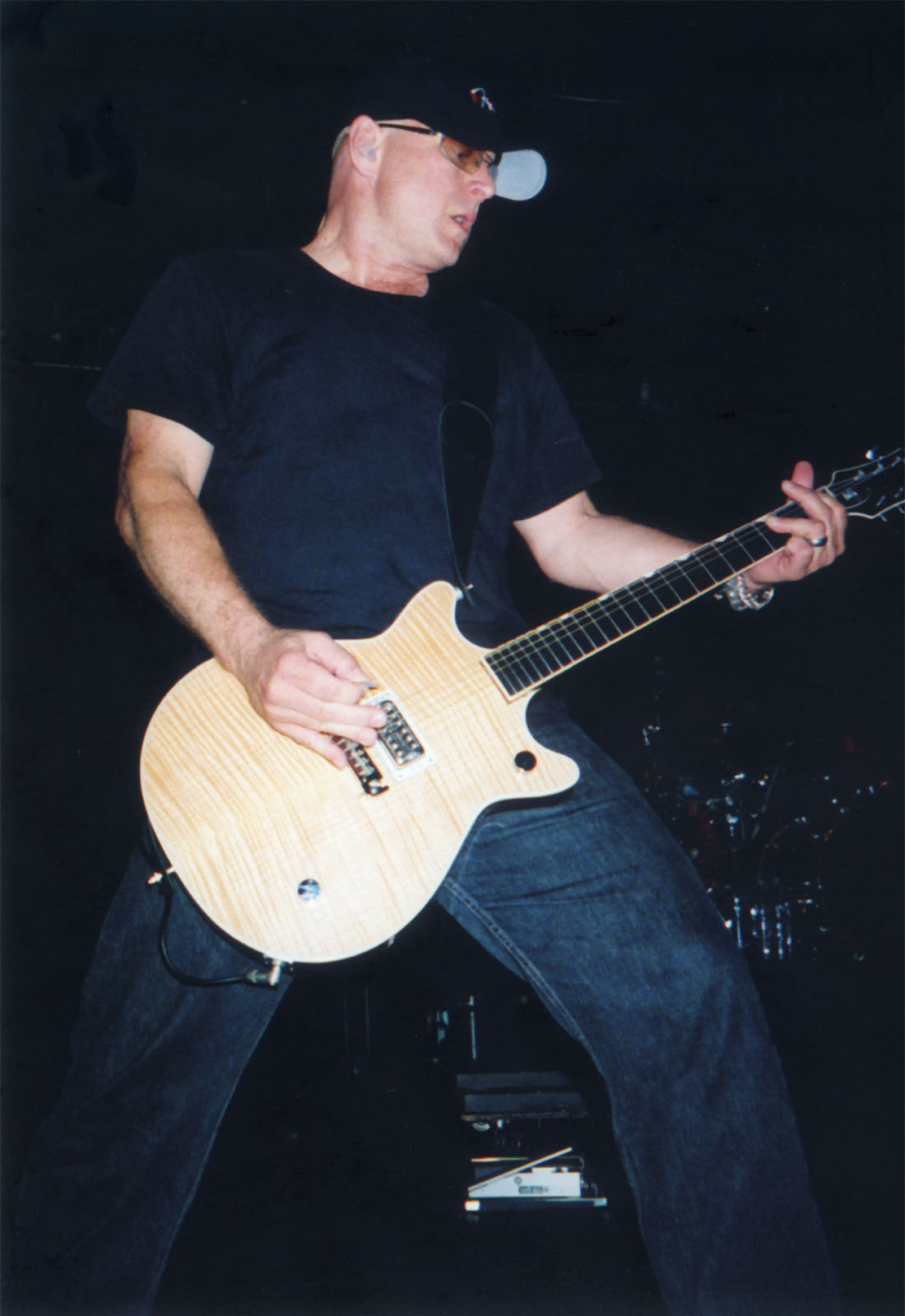
Members of Garbage: Clockwise from upper left: Manson, Vig, Erikson and Marker
- Duke Erikson – guitar, bass, keyboards, backing vocals
- Butch Vig – drums, percussion, keyboards, backing vocals
- Steve Marker – guitar, bass, keyboards, backing vocals
- Shirley Manson – lead vocals, guitar, keyboards

=== Touring musicians ===
- Nicole Fiorentino – bass, backing vocals (2025–present)

=== Former touring musicians ===
- Daniel Shulman – bass (1995–2005, 2022–2024)
- Matt Chamberlain – drums (2002; substitute for Butch Vig)
- Matthew Walker – drums (2002, 2017, 2019; substitute for Butch Vig)
- Eric Avery – bass, guitar, keyboards (2005–2023)
- Ginger Pooley – bass, backing vocals (2024–2025)

== Awards and nominations ==
Garbage have received 57 nominations, winning seventeen awards. Major awards which Garbage have been nominated for include the Grammy Awards and the BRIT Awards.

== Concert tours ==
Headlining and co-headlining tours

- Garbage tour (1995–1996)
- Version 2.0 tour (1998–1999)
- beautifulgarbage tour (2001–2002)
- Bleed Like Me tour (2005)
- Not Your Kind of People tour (2012–2013)
- 20 Years Queer tour (2015)
- Strange Little Birds tour (2016)
- Rage and Rapture tour (with Blondie) (2017)
- 20 Years Paranoid (2018)
- Summer tour (2019)
- Garbage & Noel Gallagher's High Flying Birds: Live in Concert (with Noel Gallagher's High Flying Birds) (2023)
- Garbage 2024 (2024)
- Happy Endings tour (2025)

Supporting tours

- Celebrating 25 Years of Jagged Little Pill (2020; postponed to 2021 and 2022, supporting Alanis Morissette)
- The Tipping Point World Tour (2022, supporting Tears for Fears)

== Discography ==
- Garbage (1995)
- Version 2.0 (1998)
- Beautiful Garbage (2001)
- Bleed Like Me (2005)
- Not Your Kind of People (2012)
- Strange Little Birds (2016)
- No Gods No Masters (2021)
- Let All That We Imagine Be the Light (2025)
