= The Men Who Rule the World =

Single by Garbage

from the album No Gods No Masters
- Released: March 30, 2021
- Recorded: 2018–2020
- Genre: Alternative Rock; Electronic Rock; Industrial Rock
- Length: 4:27
- Label: Stunvolume
- Songwriter: Garbage
- Producers: Garbage, Billy Bush

Garbage singles chronology
"Destroying Angels" (2018)	"The Men Who Rule the World" (2021)	"No Gods No Masters" (2021)

"The Men Who Rule the World" is a song by American alternative rock band Garbage. It was released as the lead single from their seventh studio album No Gods No Masters on March 30, 2021, by Stunvolume and BMG.

== Background and composition ==
"The Men Who Rule the World" is an electronic-rock song that opens with a slot-machine sample and features trademark elements of the Garbage sound, such as keyboards, loops, distorted guitars, as well as industrial beats. The song features bass by Justin Meldal-Johnsen.

The song originated from one of the many jams the band created in mid-2018 in Palm Springs. Initially, the song started with a simple synth riff in the verse and the line "the men who ruled the world." The lyrics were completed when vocalist Shirley Manson was recording the second season of her podcast The Jump, interviewing various musicians about a turning point in their careers. Manson was particularly inspired by her interview with George Clinton and his P-Funk Mothership concept, which is based on the idea of creating an alternative reality free of racism and hate. After recording the podcast, she went to the band's recording studio and wrote a song based on a sci-fi Noah's Ark on the jam that the band had been previously working on.

The song's lyrics revolve around racism, the blind quest of men for social and economical power, environmental abuse, and misogyny. Manson called the song an anti-racist, anti-capitalist and anti-patriarchal statement of intent and explained the song's focus was to question the "one old-man perspective", by not only having more women, but also more "black people [...], more brown people, more indigenous, trans, and non-binary people" in position of power to tackle the complex issues of modern society. Unlike the rest of the tracks, which she usually writes over time, Manson said the lyrics and the melody of "The Men Who Rule the World" came to her "like God, or whatever you consider God, sent [them] down".

The lyrics were also inspired by the movements of South American women for equal rights, legalizing abortion and stopping violence against women. In particular, the lyrics "hate the violator / destroy the violator", were inspired by the movements of Argentinian women, who stood outside the government building "with their fists in the air, screaming [...] "you are the violator, we want to destroy you" kind of thing". Manson said the violator "is anyone who is doing harm, harm to the environment, to other people’s bodies, to animals."

Drummer Butch Vig suggested the track to be the No Gods No Masters album opener. After some hesitation, Manson agreed reflecting on its potential as "mood setter" for the record and the relevance of its themes, adding "it has a lot of humor in it, and also a lot of outrage. To me, that's the perfect combo."

The single cover is a black and white edit of The Battle of La Hogue painting by Benjamin West.

== Release and promotion ==
"The Men Who Rule the World" was first teased in a snippet on social media on March 29, 2021. The following day, the digital single and music video were released at the same time as No Gods No Masters was announced. On launch, the track was added to 24 New Music Friday Spotify playlists worldwide.

A live performance of the song was filmed at Mates Rehearsal Studios in North Hollywood on May 19, 2021, for World Cafe. The song was also performed live extensively at the band's 2021 and 2022 tour dates.

In 2022, "The Men Who Rule the World" was remastered and included in the band's third greatest hits compilation Anthology.

== Music video ==
The music video of "The Men Who Rule the World" was directed by Chilean artist Javi Mi Amor and premiered on March 30, 2021, on the Garbage YouTube channel. The video relies heavily on animation realized using the rotoscoping technique and features male figures of power, such as Charles II of England and George II of Great Britain, as well as Donald Trump as the "violator". The video also features animated versions of Manson, inspired by the 1927 sci-fi film Metropolis, and Manson's own dog Veela.

== Reception ==
Barney Townsend praised the track as "a forceful protest song and a clear statement of intent from a band that still believes in the power of dissent" while Andrew Trendell from NME described it as "bold and industrial" and Cat Woods from The Sidney Morning Herald as "a distorted, gothic slice of stomping electro-rock." Robin Murray of Clash called the track "a powerful and timely document".
