= Witness to Your Love =

EP by Garbage
- Released: April 22, 2023
- Recorded: 2008–2023
- Length: 16:33
- Label: BMG
- Producers: Garbage, Billy Bush

Garbage chronology
Anthology (2022)	Witness to Your Love (2023)	Lie to Me (2024)

Witness to Your Love is an EP released by alternative rock band Garbage on April 22, 2023 for Record Store Day. It contains "Witness to Your Love", a track that was first released on the fifth volume of the Urban Outfitters and Filter Magazine charity compilation Give Listen Help in 2008, and then released as a single to promote the band's greatest hits album Anthology in 2022; a cover of "Cities in Dust" by Siouxsie and the Banshees; and two previously unreleased tracks from the No Gods No Masters (2021) sessions.

== Background and recording ==
The origin of title-track "Witness to Your Love" dates back to 2008, when singer Shirley Manson was approached by friend Jeff Castelaz, founder of the Pablove Foundation, to include a Garbage track on the fifth volume of the Give Listen Help charity compilation benefitting the Children's Hospital Los Angeles helping to fight cancer in children. Manson wrote the lyrics of "Witness to Your Love" to unfinished tracks from the Absolute Garbage sessions and finished the track with drummer Butch Vig in his GrungeIsDead home studio in Silver Lake, with guitarists Duke Erikson and Steve Marker sending guitar parts through online collaboration. Additional drums were played by Matt Walker.

In 2011, a previously unreleased acoustic version of the track was uploaded by Garbage on the media player of their Facebook page. The player has since been taken down. The acoustic version has been eventually released in 2024 on the deluxe edition of the band's fourth album Bleed Like Me reissue.

Whilst "Cities in Dust" was a newly recorded track, "Blue Betty" and "Adam and Eve" are two outtakes from the band's seventh studio album No Gods No Masters' sessions.

== Composition ==
"Witness to Your Love" has been described as a personal track dealing with the sudden death of David Williamson, the husband of Morag, one of Manson's closest friends in Scotland. Manson was inspired to write the lyrics to the song after Williamson's funeral and some of the lyrics directly reference the poem read at the memorial. The song's lyrics also mention the Edinburgh district of Canongate and Manson's episodes of shoplifting in her youth. In 2022, Manson further explained that the song was written as an attempt to comfort Morag about the loss of her husband saying "I saw him. I know he existed. And he was somewhere else, but he was there. And I'm your girl, and I've got your back. And your history is my history, and our history together is something that will move forward throughout our lives. It's a joyous song in a funny way although it's based in Debby Downerisms." Vig called the song "a pretty obscure track of ours, but one of the most beautiful songs Shirl sung."

On November 21, 2009, Manson performed a live acoustic performance of the song at the Pablo Castelaz memorial at Avalon, in Hollywood, with Vig on guitar. At the event, Manson explained the song is about "acknowledging someone's life, and in doing so, acknowledging our own and how lucky we are to be alive." The performance brought Vig and Manson close and prompted them to contact the other band members to start making music again.

"Cities in Dust" stays largely faithful to the original, albeit being more electronic and featuring more abrasive guitars. The song closes with an ad lib by Manson whispering "I love you, Siouxsie".

"Blue Betty" deals with the death of Manson's aunt Betty, who jumped off the Forth Road Bridge outside Edinburgh, Scotland, whereas "Adam and Eve" makes a reference to the pen knife Manson tied to her boot and used to self-harm during her teenage years in its lyrics.

== Release and promotion ==
"Witness to Your Love" has been released on the band's greatest hits compilation Anthology on October 28, 2022, and as a standalone digital single on the same day. It received a music video by Scottish filmmaker and long-time Garbage fan Bryan M. Ferguson. The music video was filmed in Glasgow over three days. It stars actors Maungo Pelekekae, Alasdair Scott and Sally Pritchett as three vampires, and Ferguson's wife, Vari, as a shop assistant. Ferguson wanted to "tell a story of eternal youth, dynamism and a feeling of invincibility", so he decided to turn the protagonists into "reckless bloodsuckers": the three vampires steal blood units from a hospital, go to a skatepark (The Arches DIY), shoplift Garbage CDs in a music store (Missing Records), steal a car, drink blood from a man and go dance in a nightclub before going back to sleep in coffins built from refrigerators. Throughout the video, many easter eggs referencing Garbage are featured: at the beginning, scenes from the "Push It" music video can be seen on a TV; the vampires sleep in a refrigerator with a Garbage sticker on it; at the skate park, one of the vampires has a radio with Garbage stickers; four Garbage albums can be seen in the music shop: Anthology, Garbage, Version 2.0 and Beautiful Garbage; Pelekekae wears glasses that Manson wore during the No Gods No Masters tour.

The Witness to Your Love EP was released on World Record Store Day 2023, April 22, ahead of Garbage's co-headline summer tour with Noel Gallagher's High Flying Birds. The EP was released on April 28 on digital platforms, in conjunction with a music video for "Cities In Dust" made by Javi Mi Amor.

Press releases and reviews of the EP largely focused on the "Cities in Dust" cover, also due to Siouxsie going back on tour in summer. "Cities in Dust" would be subsequently added to the setlists of the band's following tours.

== Critical reception ==
Critics were praiseful of the "Cities in Dust" cover, calling it faithful to the original and complimenting the "soaring" vocals and guitars.

== Track listing ==
All tracks are written by Garbage, except where noted.

No.	Title	Writer(s)	Length
1.	"Witness to Your Love"		3:39
2.	"Cities in Dust"	Susan Ballion, Peter Edward Clarke, Steven Severin	4:21
3.	"Blue Betty"		3:36
4.	"Adam and Eve"		4:54
Total length:			16:31

== Charts ==
Chart performance for Witness to Your Love
Chart (2023)	Peak position
UK Physical Singles (OCC)	10
UK Singles Sales (OCC)	42
UK Vinyl Singles (OCC)	8
