= No Gods No Masters (song) =

Single by Garbage

from the album No Gods No Masters
- Released: April 28, 2021
- Recorded: 2018–2020
- Genre: Synth-pop
- Length: 4:31
- Label: Stunvolume
- Songwriter: Garbage
- Producers: Garbage; Billy Bush

Garbage singles chronology
"The Men Who Rule the World" (2021)	"No Gods No Masters" (2021)	"Wolves" (2021)

"No Gods No Masters" is a song by American alternative rock band Garbage. It was released as the second single from the band's seventh studio album No Gods No Masters (2021) on April 28, 2021 by their independent label Stunvolume.

== Background and composition ==
"No Gods No Masters" is an up-tempo synth-pop song, with prominent synths, a piano riff and a complex 192-note bassline in the chorus. The bass line was written on a sequencer and later played by Eric Avery. The bridge is sung in falsetto. Singer Shirley Manson said it's one of the tracks on the album that required the most tinkering.

Lyrically, "No Gods No Masters" was inspired by the rebellions against the governments' racism, misogyny and violations of human rights that Manson witnessed in North and South America during the making of Garbage's seventh studio album. In 2019, Manson took a trip to Santiago, Chile to participate in the making of the Peace Peace Now Now documentary on the violation of human rights during the Pinochet dictatorship. As Manson arrived to film, she and the rest of the crew witnessed a revolution of the Chilean people against the abuses by the government where people wrote graffiti on historical buildings and landmarks as a sign of protest. As Manson voiced her dismay upon seeing the buildings vandalized, she was called out by the people she was with for not having compassion about the protesters, an awakening experience she recalls as "a slap in the face." A similar experience happened a few months later in Los Angeles with the Black Lives Matter movement, with people trying to take down monuments to the Confederacy, whereas she felt the government failed to recognize the value of human lives.

Manson explained that the song's lyrics were also inspired by the people's tendency to care about their close ones, yet feeling detached and hurting other people, saying "[w]e all want good things for our babies, our families, our friends. And yet we so often then want to crush someone else's spirit, who's not our friend, who's not our baby, who's not our family." At the same time, she urges people to remain hopeful about the future and re-imagine a society "not making the same mistakes over and over again and allowing greed to corrupt our thinking."

The title of the song is a direct reference to the anarchist slogan "no gods, no masters." Manson felt that this would be the perfect title for the record given the relevance of its themes. She clarified that, despite not being affiliated with any organized religion, the song is not anti-faith. "My problem is people that claim to have faith, act like they have faith, and call it 'faith,' but they're not practicing the basic tenets of any organized religion that I've ever known," she added explaining she respects other people's faiths.

The first lyric of the song, "be kind", features on the back of the album booklet and was also used as a slogan on Garbage merchandise and touring gear during the tour in support of the album.

The single cover is the edit of a print of David with the Head of Goliath by Wallerant Vaillant.

== Release and promotion ==
"No Gods No Masters" was released as the second single from the album of the same name on April 28, 2021. The same day, the music video was released on the band's YouTube channel. The single edit of the song, also used in the music video and performed during live shows, features a shorter intro and coda, omitting the lyrics "You want what's mine, I want what's yours" / "I want what's mine that once was yours".

Live performances of the song recorded at the Mates Rehearsal Studios in North Hollywood were sent to Ouï FM, Rolling Stone France, iHeart Radio and World Cafe to promote the album while keeping social distance during the ongoing COVID-19 pandemic.

In 2022, the album version of the song was remastered by Heba Kadry and included as the last song on the band's third greatest hits album Anthology.

== Music video ==
The music video of "No Gods No Masters" was directed by Scott Stuckey, produced by Laura Burhenn of Our Secret Handshake and edited by Andy Deluca. It premiered on Garbage's YouTube channel on April 28, 2021, teased by a trailer released a day before. It's the first music video featuring the band since 2017's "No Horses", also directed by Stuckey. In the blue hue-tinted music video, Manson performs the song wearing a beret, checkered tights and knee-high boots, backed by the rest of the band in a dive bar sporting a "no gods no masters" red neon sign. Some scenes feature religious imagery, where Manson is seen hanging on a cross and the rest of the band are dressed as druids. The band was styled by Candice Lambert, hair was done by Clyde Haygood and makeup by Torsten Witte.

== Reception ==
Lisa-Marie Ferla of The Arts Desk called the track "epic" and praised its lyrics for channeling "action, not thoughts and prayers, into positive change." In his enthusiastic review for All Music, Neil Z. Young called the song "a hopeful anthem to the masses" and described it as "a driving pop gem that echoes Missing Persons and Blondie." Kevin Burke of The Big Takeover called it "hypnotic" and added "[i]t is an exceptional listen, something that pulses with energy and also a welcomed positivity." Peter Piatkowski of PopMatters defined the song as "a speedy swirl of industrial noise, and undulating guitars" and called it "brisk and bracing." Amanda Whitbeck of Hidden Jams found the song to be "one of the most immediate and accessible" on the record.

A week after of the release of the No Gods No Masters album, the song had generated 850,000 streams globally.
