= Two Wolves =

Popular legend about inner conflict

The story of the Two Wolves is a memetic legend of unknown origin, commonly attributed to Cherokee or other indigenous American peoples in popular retelling. The legend is usually framed as a grandfather or elder passing wisdom to a young listener; the elder describes a battle between two wolves within one’s self, using the battle as a metaphor for inner conflict. When the listener asks which wolf wins, the grandfather answers "whichever one you feed".

While many variations of the story exist (replacing wolves with dogs, changing the nature of the conflict, etc.) the usual conflict uses the imagery of white versus black and good versus evil.

== In media ==
The story is quoted and referenced in various forms in media articles.

The story is featured in the 2015 film Tomorrowland:

Casey: "There are two wolves" ... You told me this story my entire life, and now I'm telling you: There are two wolves and they are always fighting. One is darkness and despair, the other is light and hope. Which wolf wins?
Eddie: C'mon, Casey.
Casey: Okay, fine, don't answer.
Eddie: Whichever one you feed.

Other examples include:

- In the television series Luke Cage (Season 2, Episode 2, at time-index 48:06) a pastor tells the story of a "Cherokee Legend", with the metaphor of two wolves fighting, where the boy in the story asks "Which wolf is stronger?" and his grandfather responds: "It's the one you feed."
- In an issue of the Daredevil comic series, the character Echo encounters Wolverine while on a vision quest. He tells her a version of the Two Wolves story he learned from the Chief, albeit referring to them as dogs. Echo then reveals that her late father was the one who originally told that story to the Chief.
- In Knightfall (Season One, Episode Four, "He Who Discovers His Own Self, Discovers God) Godfrey tells the story to Landry in a flashback.
- In the television series 12 Monkeys (Season 1, Episode 6, at time-index 29:14) Cole tells Aaron the story as he mentions that Cassie feeds the good wolf.
- The marquee of the Tarkovsky Theatre in John Wick: Chapter 3 – Parabellum advertises a performance titled "A Tale of Two Wolves."

== Versions with dogs ==
There are similar stories told by Christian ministers appearing in print prior to the story of the Two Wolves that refer to dogs instead of wolves.

An early variation of this story was published in The Daily Republican, Monongahela, Pennsylvania on November 16, 1962. William J. Turner Jr. prefaced a meditation on "two natures within" (Romans 7:18–19) with this illustration: "A man traveling through the mountains came upon an old mountaineer who had two dogs. Both dogs were the same size, and they fought continually. The visitor asked the mountaineer which dog usually won. The old fellow studied for a moment, spat over the fence, and said, 'The one I feeds the most.'"

A version of this story was first published in 1965, then in 1978 by the Reverend Billy Graham in his book The Holy Spirit: Activating God's Power in Your Life, which told a story of "an Eskimo fisherman" with a black dog and a white dog that he used for match fixing by only feeding the one he wanted to win. Graham explains that the story refers to the "inner warfare that comes into the life of a person who is born again".

The Baptist pastor John R. Bisagno in The Power of Positive Praying (Xulon Press, 1965) gave a version in which a missionary is told by a Mohave Indian convert named Joe that he has a black dog and a white dog always fighting inside him, and that the dog which Joe feeds the most will win.

In I'm a Good Man, but… (1969), Fritz Ridenour writes: "A supposedly true story from the mission field pretty well sums it up. The missionary was talking to the old Indian about what it was like to be a Christian and the Indian said that being a Christian was like having two dogs inside of him fighting. There was the bad dog (sin) and the good dog (righteousness). 'Which is winning?' asked the missionary. 'The one I feed the most.'"

In How to Win Souls and Influence People for Heaven (1973), George Godfrey recounts a tale where an Indian convert says that in his chest he has a white dog that wants to do good, and a black dog that wants to do bad, which are always fighting with each other. After the missionary asks which one wins, he says that the one that he feeds wins.

In The Presbyterian Journal, Volume 34 (1975), George Aiken Taylor writes: "[…] two dogs fighting in the soul. 'Which one will win?' asked the convert. 'The one you feed the most,' answered the missionary."

The 1998 book Experiencing the Soul: Before Birth, During Life, After Death, by Eliot Rosen, uses the story to conclude the first chapter: "A Native American Elder once described his own inner struggles in this manner: 'Inside of me there are two dogs. One of the dogs is mean and evil. The other dog is good. The mean dog fights the good dog all the time.' When asked which dog wins, he reflected for a moment and replied, 'The one I feed the most.'"

== See also ==
- Wolves in folklore, religion and mythology
- The chariot allegory in Plato's Phaedrus
