= Ohana Festival =

Annual music festival in California, US

Ohana Festival is an annual music festival that takes place in Dana Point, California.

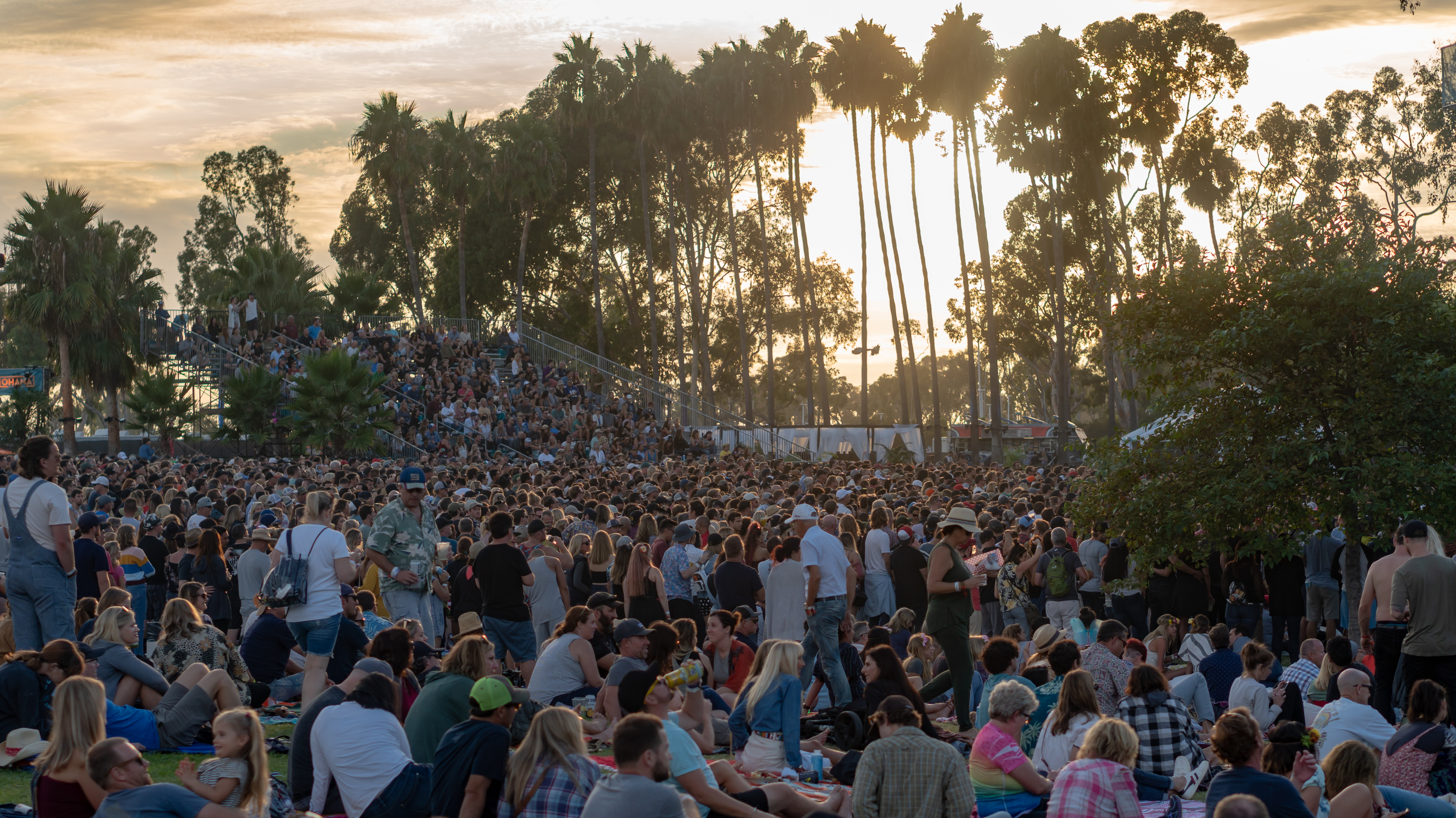
Crowd at the Ohana Festival in October 2018.

== History ==
Ohana Festival began as a partnership between Live Nation, Eddie Vedder, and Pearl Jam manager Mark Smith, and is named after the Hawaiian concept for family. The first event was held in August 2016 at Doheny State Beach and included artists such as Vedder, Elvis Costello, Lana Del Rey, Band of Horses, Cat Power, and City and Colour. By 2023, the festival drew 14,500 people per day and included food vendors and a storyteller stage where speakers give talks on issues that include environmental justice. The festival has been named Music Festival of the Year (Global: Under 30K Attendance) for three consecutive years in 2024, 2025 and 2026.
