= List of killings by law enforcement officers in the United States, June 2020 =

This is a list of people reported killed by non-military law enforcement officers in the United States in June 2020, whether in the line of duty or not, and regardless of reason or method. The listing documents the occurrence of a death, making no implications regarding wrongdoing or justification on the part of the person killed or officer involved. Killings are arranged by date of the incident that caused death. Different death dates, if known, are noted in the description. The table below lists 89 people.

== June 2020 ==
Date	Name (age) of deceased	Race	State (city)	Description
2020-06-30	Lance Bowman (30)	Unknown race	Missouri (Liberty)	
2020-06-30	Kevin Lee Catlett (62)	Unknown race	Tennessee (Johnson City)	
2020-06-29	Brittany S. Teichroeb (26)	White	Texas (Midland)	
2020-06-29	Nick Costales (34)	Hispanic	California (Montclair)	
2020-06-29	Wade Russell Meisberger (48)	White	Pennsylvania (Hazleton)	
2020-06-29	John Parks (57)	White	Kentucky (Paducah)	
2020-06-28	James Tober Sr. (68)	White	Ohio (Kettering)	
2020-06-28	Ray Adrian Lara (36)	Unknown	Texas (El Paso)	University of Texas at El Paso police responded to reports of a naked man who ran after a female's car. When police arrived, "the naked man was combative and they had to use a taser to subdue him and take him into custody". The man became "unconscious and unresponsive", and was later pronounced dead.
2020-06-27	Aloysius Larue Keaton (58)	Black	Arkansas (Little Rock)	
2020-06-27	Bonnie Jo Figueroa-Ortiz (40)	White	Florida (Port Richey)	
2020-06-27	Michael Pelley (33)	White	Kentucky (Hebron)	
2020-06-27	Leonardo Hurtado Ibarra (25)	Hispanic	California (San Diego)	
2020-06-27	Louis Lane (31)	Unknown race	California (Red Bluff)	
2020-06-26	Aaron Wesley Keller (30)	White	Nevada (Elko)	
2020-06-25	Sabastian S. Noel (27)	White	Florida (Auburndale)	
2020-06-25	Martin Humberto Sanchez Fregoso (37)	Hispanic	Georgia (Cumberland)	
2020-06-25	Rasheed Mathew Moorman (26)	Black	Virginia (Roanoke)	
2020-06-25	Robert D'Lon Harris (34)	Black	Oklahoma (Vinita)	
2020-06-25	Julie Colon	Unknown race	Texas (Plano)	
2020-06-24	Sunshine Kamille Salac	Asian	California (Lake Forest)	
2020-06-24	Skyleur Young (31)	Black	California (San Bernardino)	
2020-06-23	Kevin Pulido (43)	Hispanic	Colorado (Pueblo)	
2020-06-23	Chazz Hailey (22)	Asian	Texas (Sherman)	
2020-06-23	Matthew L. Fox (40)	Unknown race	Alaska (Wasilla)	
2020-06-22	Robert Wenman	Unknown race	Nevada (North Las Vegas)	
2020-06-22	David Guillen	Unknown race	Colorado (Aurora)	
2020-06-22	Jason James Kruzic (51)	Unknown race	Iowa (Nevada)	
2020-06-22	Derrick Canada (43)	Black	Texas (Giddings)	
2020-06-22	Aaron Solorio Granados	Hispanic	California (Palm Desert)	
2020-06-21	George Zapantis (29)	White	New York (New York City)	Police were called to a home in Queens after Zapantis and his neighbors argued, with the caller incorrectly mentioning there was a gun. Officers found Zapantis, dressed in a gladiator-like outfit and wielding a sword. After trying to contain him in the home, he appeared again without the outfit or sword. Police tased Zapantis multiple times and restrained him, causing him to lose consciousness. His death was ruled a homicide.
2020-06-21	Brandeis Codde (19)	Unknown race	California (Milpitaa)	
2020-06-20	Michael Kristopher Torres (35)	Hispanic	Louisiana (Lake Charles)	
2020-06-19	Henry Barnes Jr. (25)	Native American	Oklahoma (Jay)	
2020-06-19	Cody W. Cook (24)	White	New York (Sodus)	
2020-06-18	Christopher Howell (51)	White	Lake County, Florida	Howell, a mentally ill prisoner at the Lake Correctional Institution, was restrained in an arm bar after fighting officers. As he was restrained, an officer utilized excessive force, and Howell suffered a fatal head injury from striking his head on the wall. The officer was found guilty of manslaughter.
2020-06-18	Buddy Edward Weeks (35)	White	North Carolina (Maiden)	
2020-06-18	Kellen Fortune (19)	White	Montana (Billings)	
2020-06-18	David Lee Jacobs (38)	White	Colorado (Westminster)	
2020-06-18	Andres Guardado (18)	Hispanic/Latino	California (Los Angeles)	Guardado was shot and killed by police officers for unknown reasons after contacting him after a short pursuit. According to a Los Angeles county sheriff's department spokesperson, police officers saw Guardado produce a handgun before running away. The police officers pursued him on foot, and shot him when they made contact a short while later. Guardado died at the scene. Guardado's family disputes the accounts of the police, insisting that Guardado did not own a firearm.
2020-06-17	Terron Jammal Boone (31)	African American	California (Los Angeles)	Boone was shot and killed by police officers attempting to arrest Boone on charges of kidnapping, spousal assault and assault with a deadly weapon. Members of the Los Angeles County Sheriff Department's Major Crimes Bureau stopped Boone in an SUV driven by a woman police described as a former girlfriend of Boone. A 7-year-old girl was a passenger along with Boone. According to a statement from the Sheriff's Department, deputies shouted for Bonne to put his hands up and Boone opened the passenger door and began firing from a semiautomatic handgun. The police returned fire hitting Boone several times in the upper body and killing him at the scene. The woman driving the SUV was struck by gunfire, treated at a hospital and released. The girl and detectives were not injured. Boone was the half brother of Robert Fuller, whose death, which was ruled a suicide, had raised controversy earlier in the month.
2020-06-17	Troy Willey (50)	Caucasian/White	Indiana (Kennard)	Willey was shot and killed by SWAT police members when Willey refused to drop his gun after a standoff. According to police statements, Henry County Sheriff’s Department officers responded to a domestic situation where they found an injured woman outside a home where Willey barricaded himself. Police stated that they called negotiators to the scene, but Willey would not leave the home. After several hours, SWAT members were sent in, who encountered Willey and ordered him to drop his gun. Willey refused, at which point officers shot him. Willey died at the scene. Indiana State Police are investigating the shooting.
2020-06-17	Isaiah Pama (28)	Asian	Hawaii (Kaneohe)	
2020-06-17	Keith William Brunelle (48)	White	Mississippi (Collinsville)	
2020-06-17	Jack Harry	White	Nevada (Lovelock)	
2020-06-16	Donald Ward (27)	Black	Arizona (Phoenix)	
2020-06-16	Brandon Gardner (24)	Black	Illinois (Beach Park)	
2020-06-15	Nicholas Hirsh (31)	Caucasian/White	Kansas (Lawrence)	Hirsh was shot and killed by Kansas Highway Patrol officers pursuing Hirsh for a first-degree murder arrest warrant. According to police statements, Hirsh stole a car and pointed a gun at officers during pursuit, at which point he was shot and killed.
2020-06-14	Hannah R. Fizer (25)	Caucasian/White	Sedalia, Missouri	Fizer was shot and killed by police during a traffic stop. Officials stated that Fizer refused to identify herself, stated that she was armed, and verbally threatened to shoot the officer at the traffic stop, which prompted the officer to shoot her. Fizer died at the scene a short while later.
2020-06-13	Anthony Angel Armenta (21)	Hispanic/Latino	California (San Bernardino)	Armenta was shot and killed by police responding to reports of a person with a gun at a gas station. According to police statements, police confronted Armenta and ordered him to drop an object that appeared to be a black handgun. Armenta did not comply, and pointed the object at the police, at which point officers shot Armenta. He was taken to a hospital and pronounced dead. Some eyewitnesses stated that Armenta was seen to dig through the trash with a flashlight beforehand, and that the police mistook the flashlight for a gun.
2020-06-13	William Slyter (22)	Unknown	Missouri (Kansas City)	Slyter was shot and killed by police pursuing Slyter in response to a report of armed carjacking. According to Missouri State Highway patrol, officers responded to a report of armed carjacking, pursued Slyter in the stolen vehicle, and later pursued Slyter on foot. After the foot pursuit, Slyter allegedly presented a handgun, at which point a pursuing officer shot him. Slyter died at the scene. The Missouri State Highway patrol is investigating this shooting.
2020-06-12	Caine Van Pelt (23)	African American	Crown Point, Indiana	Van Pelt was shot and killed by Indiana State Police state troopers responding to an armed robbery report. According to police statements, Van Pelt stole a black Mitsubishi, and state troopers found and pursued the Mitsubishi until it slowed because of a flat tire. Van Pelt got out of the car and fired at the officers, who returned fire and shot Van Pelt. He died at the scene. Police is still looking for a second suspect in the armed robbery.
2020-06-12	Rayshard Brooks (27)	African American	Georgia (Atlanta)	Brooks was shot and killed by police officers responding to a report of a man sleeping in a parked vehicle in a drive-thru. When officers Garrett Rolfe and Devin Brosnan tried to arrest Brooks, he wrested away one officer's taser, overpowered the two officers, ran away, and the officers then chased him. Rolfe fired three shots after Brooks discharged the taser in his direction. Brooks was shot twice in the back, and was then transported to a hospital, where he died.
2020-06-11	Mason James Lira (26)	Caucasian/White	California (Paso Robles)	Lira was shot and killed by Central California sheriff's deputies during a 36 hour manhunt for Lira, who ambushed a Paso Robles police station.
2020-06-11	Tiffany T. Bingham (42)	Unknown race	Georgia (Tunnel Hill)	
2020-06-11	Phillip Jackson (32)	Black	Georgia (Tunnel Hill)	
2020-06-11	Michael 'Blue' Thomas (62)	African American	California (Los Angeles)	Thomas was shot and killed by LA County Sheriff's deputies who were responding to reports of a domestic dispute in Lancaster. According to police, when the police arrived at Thomas' home and tried to detain him in his living room, he refused to comply. Thomas allegedly reached for one of the officer's guns, at which point one of the deputies shot him. Thomas' fiance disputes the officer's claims and stated that Thomas was simply turning away from the officers. According to police, Thomas was taken to a hospital, where he was pronounced dead.
2020-06-11	Gregorio Cruz Vanloo (28)	Hispanic/Latino	Tennessee (Smithville)	Vanloo was shot and killed by police attempting to arrest him in connection with a "shots fired" incident. According to police statements, Vanloo exchanged gunfire with police when officers tried to arrest him. Vanloo was taken to a hospital where he was pronounced dead. The Tennessee Bureau of Investigation and District Attorney General Bryant Dunaway are investigating the shooting.
2020-06-10	Jerry M. Bethel (59)	Unknown	Weippe, Idaho	Bethel was shot and killed by police carrying out a search warrant. According to police statements, police encountered Bethel while securing the scene for a search warrant, Bethel pointed a gun at himself, and then later at officers, at which point two officers shot Bethel. He died at the scene. The Region Two Officer Involved Critical Incident Task Force is investigating the shooting.
2020-06-10	Phillip Dibenedetto (36)	Unknown	Winter Haven, Florida	Dibenedetto was shot and killed by Polk County Sheriff’s Office deputies trying to arrest him for allegedly stabbing his mother. According to police statements, officers arrived at the scene of the alleged stabbing and tried to get Dibenedetto to peacefully surrender. Dibenedetto told the officers he was armed, and reached for a handgun, at which point officers used a Taser on Dibenedetto. Despite the effects of the Taser, Dibenedetto allegedly armed himself and shot at the deputies, who returned fire and shot Dibenedetto. He was pronounced dead at the scene.
2020-06-10	Mason James Lira (26)	White	California (Paso Robles)	
2020-06-10	Jennifer Miller (56)	White	Texas (Lockhart)	
2020-06-09	Morgan James Davis (37)	White	California (Redding)	
2020-06-09	Richard Mason (59)	Unknown	Montana (Kalispell)	Mason was shot and killed by police pursuing him as a suspect in another shooting. According to police statements, police pursued Mason and eventually stopped his vehicle with spike stripes, at which point Mason exchanged fire with the police. Mason was shot and died at the scene. The officer-involved shooting is being handled by the Montana Department of Justice Division of Criminal Investigation.
2020-06-09	Lewis Ruffin Jr. (38)	African American	Florida (Orlando)	Ruffin was shot and killed by police officers attempting to arrest him for domestic violence, false imprisonment, and weapons charges. According to Orange County Sheriff John Mina, deputies located Ruffin and attempted to arrest him, at which point he shot at the officers. The officers returned fire and shot Ruffin. He was later taken to a hospital and pronounced dead. The Florida Department of Law Enforcement is investigating the shooting. All five deputies involved in the shooting are on paid administrative leave pending the investigation.
2020-06-09	Marcus James Uribe (31)	African American	Colorado (Englewood)	Uribe was shot and killed by police officers who were responding to a report of domestic violence at a light rail station. According to police statements, when officers arrived, Uribe exchanged gunfire with the officers. Uribe was shot and died at the scene.
2020-06-08	Michael Seltzer (81)	Caucasian/White	New Mexico (Las Cruces)	Seltzer was shot and killed by police officers responding to reports that he had suicidal ideations. According to police statements, Seltzer was armed when police arrived, and police surrounded Seltzer's home to try to get Seltzer to disarm himself and exit his residence. Seltzer allegedly opened fire multiple times from within his home during the standoff with the police. After several hours, Seltzer allegedly exited his home in a threatening manner and armed with handgun, at which point officers shot Seltzer. He was pronounced dead at the scene. The Officer-involved Incident Task Force, including investigators from New Mexico State Police, Las Cruces Police Department, Doña Ana County Sheriff’s Office and New Mexico State University Police, is investigating the shooting.
2020-06-07	Donald L. Hunter (39)	Unknown	Missouri (Butler)	Hunter was shot and killed by police pursuing him in response to an abduction. According to police statements, Hunter abducted a woman in her vehicle and was on his way to Kansas city when he was stopped by police. Hunter shot the woman as she attempted to escape, at which point officers shot him. Hunter died at the scene. Cass County Sheriff’s Office is investigating the shooting.
2020-06-07	Jarrid Hurst (35)	Caucasian/White	California (Industry)	Hurst was shot and killed by police responding to reports of a person struck by a train. According to police statements, Hurst was kneeling by the railroad tracks as officers approached him, he then stood up and charged at the deputies with a knife in his hand, at which point a deputy shot him. Hurst was taken to the hospital, where he was pronounced dead.
2020-06-07	Juan Carlos Alvarez (24)	Hispanic	California (Bakersfield)	
2020-06-07	Jeffrey McClure (26)	Caucasian/White	New York (East Northport)	McClure was shot and killed by police officers who were responding to a domestic incident 911 call. McClure pointed what appeared to be a hunting rifle at officers and was fatally shot after ignoring commands to drop the gun, which turned out to be an air gun.
2020-06-06	Kamal Flowers (24)	African American	New York (New Rochelle)	Flowers was shot dead by police during a traffic stop. According to New Rochelle, NY., police, Flowers got out of the car on the passenger side and tried to run away, one of the officers fired their Taser, and a struggle ensued. Flowers then allegedly pulled out a handgun and aimed for the officers, at which point one of the officers fired back, hitting Flowers. The officers attempted to bring Flowers to the hospital, but he died en route. Shortly after the shooting the office of the New York State Attorney General(AG) declined to investigate Flowers' death, a spokesperson stating the incident fell outside the jurisdiction of the state AG. The Westchester County district attorney investigated the incident, with a grand jury in November 2020 declining to pursue criminal charges against the New Rochelle officer accused of wrongfully shooting and killing Flowers after reviewing the case evidence and hearing testimony from 35 persons, including the accused officer
2020-06-06	Erik Salgado (23)	/ap	California (Oakland)	In Oakland, 23-year-old Erik Salgado was shot dead by California Highway Patrol officers during a vehicle pursuit that ended less than a block from his mother’s house. Salgado’s girlfriend, a passenger in the vehicle, was wounded. Officers fired 46 shots against the car while Salgado was allegedly ramming police cars in an attempt to escape arrest. According to a police report, Salgado's Dodge Challenger was one of 72 cars that were recently stolen from a Dodge dealership in San Leandro, California when looting broke out across the Bay Area.
2020-06-06	Ray Lee Jim (21)	Unknown race	New Mexico (Gallup)	
2020-06-06	Gerard John (25)	Unknown race	New Mexico (Gallup)	
2020-06-06	Gregory Lee Turnure (37)	Unknown	Tennessee (Monterey)	Turnure was shot and killed by police responding to reports that Turnure was threatening to harm himself and others. According to a Tennessee Bureau of Investigation (TBI) statement, deputies sent by the Fentress County Sheriff’s Office met Turnure, who was allegedly armed with a knife, a hatchet, and a pipe, on the roadway and ordered him to drop his weapons, and when Turnure did not respond to verbal commands, one of the officers shot him with his Taser. Turnure then allegedly attempted to hit the officers with the pipe, at which point one of the officers shot Turnure. Turnure died at the scene. TBI is investigating the shooting.
2020-06-05	Benjamin Ballard (42)	Caucasian/White	Oklahoma (Mustang)	Ballard was shot and killed by police during a traffic stop. According to police statements, an officer stopped Ballard for suspected drunk driving, at which point Ballard pulled out a firearm and aimed it at the officer. The officer shot Ballard, and he died at the scene. The Oklahoma State Bureau of Investigation is investigating the shooting.
2020-06-05	James Pharr (60)	Unknown	Texas (El Paso)	Pharr was shot and killed by police responding to reports that Pharr was suicidal. According to police statements, Pharr, armed with a handgun and a shotgun, entered into an hour-long verbal standoff with police. Allegedly, Pharr eventually became agitated and fired at police with his shotgun; police returned fire and struck Pharr. He died at the scene. EPCSO is investigating the shooting.
2020-06-03	Eric Galvan (25)	Unknown	Texas (Corpus Christi)	Galvan was shot and killed by police attempting to follow up on a homicide investigation; Galvan was a person of interest in that investigation. According to statements by District Attorney Mark A. Gonzalez, three officers confronted Galvan in his bedroom where they saw that he had a gun. The officer tried to disarm Galvan, but he opened fire despite being stunned with a Taser, at which point the officers returned fire. Galvan died at the scene. All three officers are on administrative leave pending an investigation on the shooting.
2020-06-03	Gregory W. Hallback (44)	Unknown	South Carolina (Aiken)	Hallback was shot and killed by police responding to a domestic call involving a gun. According to police statements, Hallback fled into the woods when confronted by police. While in pursuit, deputies allegedly encountered Hallback with handguns in both hands, at which point deputies shot Hallback. Officers transported Hallback to an area hospital; Hallback died from his injuries shortly after. The South Carolina Law Enforcement Division is investigating the shooting. The incident in Aiken County is the 21st officer-involved shooting in South Carolina this year, according to SLED.
2020-06-03	Guadalupe Francisco-Martinez (37)	Hispanic	Illinois (Chicago)	
2020-06-03	Scott Hutton (36)	White	Arkansas (Alexander)	Calvin Nicholas "Nick" Salyers, a police officer, age 33, fatally shot Scott Hutton, a fellow Alexander, Arkansas police officer, with a Glock .40-caliber handgun. Hutton knocked on Salyers' door in the evening to pick up a patrol car near Salyers' home. Hutton was shot through the door. Salyers was charged in mid-July 2020 with manslaughter in connection with the killing. According to the affidavit made in support of the arrest warrant, Salyers had previously threatened to shoot protesters through his door. Salyers told investigators that he realized whom he had shot only "after he saw Hutton fall off the porch."
2020-06-03	Mary Lawrence (39)	Unknown	Oklahoma (LeFLore County)	Lawrence was shot and killed by police confronting Lawrence in a home. According to police statements, the officer commanded Lawrence to show her hands, and once the officer saw that Lawrence had a knife in her hands, commanded her to drop the knife. Instead, Lawrence allegedly rushed towards the homeowner, at which point the officer shot Lawrence. Lawrence died at the scene. The Oklahoma Bureau of Investigations is investigating the shooting.
2020-06-02	Tyquarn Graves (34)	Unknown	New York (New York)	Graves was shot and killed by police responding to reports of a shooting. According to police statements, officers found Graves hiding behind a tree with a gun, and ordered him to drop the gun; when Graves did not drop the gun, officers opened fire and killed him.
2020-06-02	Robert Lyon (65)	Unknown	California (Cottonwood)	Lyon was shot and killed by police responding to a call reporting that Lyon was threatening a woman with a gun. According to police statements, Lyon confronted police with a loaded shotgun, and refused multiple commands, at which point officers shot him. Lyon died at the scene. The Redding Police Department Investigations Division is investigating the shooting.
2020-06-02	Sean Monterrosa (22)	Hispanic/Latino	California (Vallejo)	Monterrosa was shot and killed by Detective Jarrett Tonn while on his knees with his hands up, during the George Floyd protests in California. When Monterrosa lifted his hands, a 15-inch hammer tucked in his pocket was revealed, which was mistaken for a handgun. Detective Tonn fired on Monterrosa five times through the windshield before he had fully stopped his unmarked police cruiser.
2020-06-01	Jorge Gomez (25)	Latino	Nevada (Las Vegas)	On June 1 in Las Vegas, police shot and killed Jorge Gomez. Gomez was walking among protesters, armed with three firearms, during the George Floyd protests as a demonstration was coming to an end. He reportedly approached police officers who tried to subdue him with less than lethal shotgun rounds. Gomez fled the scene and ran into four police officers who were responding to an incident where a Las Vegas Metropolitan Police officer had been shot in the head nearby. The officers got out of their vehicles when, allegedly, Gomez raised one of his firearms at them. Police opened fire and killed Gomez.
2020-06-01	Sandra Holzshu (79)	Unknown	Pennsylvania (Hermitage)	Holzshu was struck and killed by a police cruiser on patrol. Holzshu was transported to UPMC Presbyterian Hospital in Pittsburgh, where she died Saturday June 6th. State police and Hermitage officers are investigating the crash.
2020-06-01	David McAtee (53)	African American	Kentucky (Louisville)	McAtee, a local restaurant owner, was shot and killed after police opened fire during a George Floyd protest. The police alleged that they returned fire after shots were fired at them, while some of the protestors claimed that they were peaceful and the police opened fire without warning. According to the victim's sister, the gathering was not a protest but rather a regularly scheduled social gathering at which McAtee served food from his barbecue restaurant. Louisville police chief Steve Conrad was fired later that day, as officers and troops involved in the shooting did not wear or failed to activate body cameras.
2020-06-01	Ryan Emblem Moore (36)	Unknown	Arkansas (Fayetteville)	Moore was shot and killed by police serving a high-risk felony warrant on Moore for attempted capital murder. According to police statements, police exchanged fire with Moore while serving the warrant and killed him. The FBI is investigating the shooting.

== See also ==
- Death in custody § United States
- Henry A. Wallace Police Crime Public Database
- List of cases of police brutality
- List of countries with annual rates and counts for killings by law enforcement officers
- List of law enforcement officers killed in the line of duty in the United States
- List of law enforcement officers convicted for an on-duty killing in the United States
- List of shootings by US immigration agents
- List of police reforms related to the George Floyd protests
- List of unarmed African Americans killed by law enforcement officers in the United States
- Lists of killings by law enforcement officers
- Police brutality in the United States
- Police misconduct § United States
- Police riot § United States
- Police use of deadly force in the United States
