= Let All That We Imagine Be the Light =

Studio album by Garbage
- Released: May 30, 2025
- Recorded: 2022–2024
- Studios: Red Razor (Atwater Village, California); GrungeIsDead, Los Angeles, California; Shirley Manson's bedroom, Los Angeles, California
- Length: 45:16
- Label: BMG
- Producers: Garbage; Billy Bush

Garbage chronology
Copy/Paste (2024)	Let All That We Imagine Be the Light (2025)

Singles from Let All That We Imagine Be the Light
- 1. "There's No Future in Optimism" Released: April 9, 2025; 2. "Get Out My Face AKA Bad Kitty" Released: May 9, 2025

Let All That We Imagine Be the Light is the eighth studio album by American rock band Garbage, released on May 30, 2025, through BMG. It was recorded between 2022 and 2024 across sessions in two California-based studios and Shirley Manson's bedroom. It was produced by the band and Billy Bush. Musically, Let All That We Imagine Be The Light departs from the socio-political ideas of No Gods No Masters (2021) with more optimistic lyrics and themes.

To promote the album, Garbage embarked on the Happy Endings tour and released two singles: "There's No Future in Optimism" and "Get Out My Face AKA Bad Kitty". It charted in seven countries worldwide, reaching number eight on the Top Album Sales chart—the band's first work to not enter the US Billboard 200—and number 24 on the UK Albums Chart. It reached number two on the albums charts in Manson's native Scotland. Critics praised the emotional depth of Let All That We Imagine Be The Light, some of whom deemed it a return-to-form for the band.

== Background ==
In July 2022, vocalist Shirley Manson said Garbage had started writing for the follow-up album to No Gods No Masters earlier in the year. The album's recording and production would be subsequently interrupted by two concert tours and affected by personal incidents, such as Manson's 2023 and 2024 surgeries, writer's block and the death of her dog Veela. Over the next two years, several deadlines were missed and the album's release would eventually be pushed back to 2025, from an initial plan to finish it by spring 2023. During the album's recording, the band also released two EPs: Witness to Your Love in 2023 and Lie to Me in 2024 as part of Record Store Day. Manson explained that the writing of the album was influenced by her hip replacement surgery in 2023, during which she was bedridden and under the influence of pain medication. "It definitely influenced the way I write, because I wasn't completely sane — you're in a different kind of state. So you can hear some of that suffering on the album," she revealed.

Recorded over the course of several international conflicts, such as the Russian invasion of Ukraine, the Congo-Rwanda conflict, and the Israeli-Palestinian conflict, despite initial intentions to record the album with "a clean slate," the band admitted it was inevitable for societal and political topics to start affecting the album. However, compared to their previous album, the band chose hope against indignation: "we all thought that if we immersed ourselves in indignation we would probably die of a broken heart. So we tried to look for something a little more positive, and the album is very much about finding love in the world as a tool to combat all the hate we feel," Manson explained.

The idea of including an octopus on the album cover was brought to the band by Manson as they were trying to find references to the number eight on the album. She wrote it on the whiteboard at the studio the band was working in and it eventually became a metaphor of the band and the way they work. "It’s this weird creature that lurks in the shadows, a solitary figure that has eight limbs always reaching out in different directions, but has this center brain. That’s how we operate in the world. And so, it just became something — we named our group chat ‘Octopus,’ and then it just stuck," Manson commented.

Initially meant to reference the octopus in its title, the album was titled after a lyric in the song "Radical". Garbage made multiple references to the album title, beginning with an Instagram story on November 18, 2024, which teased "Let all that we imagine / Be the light." A post with the hashtag #letallthatweimaginebethelight followed on November 26. Two further posts referring to the album title were made on December 31, 2024, and January 1, 2025, respectively. Manson said the title "is the perfect descriptor for this new record as a whole. When things feel dark it feels imperative to seek out forces that are light, positive and beautiful in the world. It almost feels like a matter of life and death. A strategy for survival." Manson added that the title reflects the desire to resist negative political forces, including threats to women's and minority rights and the rise of right-wing movements. "This is about the power of the mind, the imagination and the spirit, the ability to transcend negativity," she emphasized.

== Recording and production ==
Recording for the album began after the band's performance at the Hollywood Bowl for Audacy's 9th annual We Can Survive on October 22, 2022. The album was recorded at sound engineer Billy Bush's Red Razor studio in Atwater Village, in drummer's Butch Vig's GrungeIsDead studio in Los Angeles and in Manson's bedroom. Bush would record the band jamming and then the band would proceed into editing down the long jam sessions into songs. Vig explained, "we sort of take those jams and we'll start to edit them down into what we think is, 'this part's cool here', 'I really like what Shirley sang here'. We'll take the 20 minute jam and edit it down to like four or five minutes and try to distill a song out of that." The album was born under unusual circumstances for the band: in January 2023, Manson underwent hip replacement surgery, whilst the rest of the band continued to work on the album in studio. The operation and subsequent rehabilitation left her unable to join the band and for two months she experienced writer's block. She resumed writing for the album in March of the same year. She later explained that due to the surgery, she was forced to work from home, developing songs from "cinematic sketches" sent to her by the rest of the band. During her recovery, she wrote and recorded the vocals for the song "The Day That I Met God" in her bedroom.

On February 13, Garbage announced their summer 2023 co-headline North American tour with Noel Gallagher's High Flying Birds featuring Metric as special guests. The same week, Vig affirmed the plan was to finish the album by June 1. In June, in between rehearsals for the tour, Vig told Nick D'Virgilio the album was still in the works, with 15 or 16 work-in-progress songs, which are "quite varied — some are very Garbage-esque sounding as usual, some are quite strange, but I think those are the ones that we like the most." Vig added the band hoped to finish the album in the fall, with a spring 2024 release. In an interview by Scott Lipps on the Lipps Service podcast, Vig admitted a couple songs on the album were inspired by socio-political themes. "A couple songs sound like Pink Floyd on the new record and some are strange pop songs — they're really hooky but sort of strangely constructed in a way. It's hard to tell with a Garbage record until we mix it 'cause a lot of the songs get final focus when we decide what to leave in or leave out of the mix," he added.

In September, Garbage performed three more shows in Latin America and in December they performed at the KROQ Almost Acoustic Christmas, their last date of 2023. When interviewed by Megan Holiday, guitarist Duke Erikson said the band was still in the recording process. In an Instagram post, Manson affirmed the band would reconvene on January 22 to "start nailing down our 8th studio album before we hit the road again later in the year." On January 27, Manson said she recorded the first complete vocal for a song on the album and guitarist Steve Marker added Glamour Box effects on it. On February 23, Garbage posted an Instagram video where Duke plays an Otamatone with the caption "we are serious musicians on the long road of creativity and discovery." The same day, an Instagram story was posted with a studio board where work-in-progress track titles could be discerned, such as "R U Happy Now", "Have We Met (The Void)", "Sisyphus" and "The Day That I Met God". On February 28, in another story the title "Sober & Sorry" could be spotted on the board.

In April, Manson told NME that the band was on track to complete the album by the end of May. After a series of updates on social media, on May 25, Manson wrote on Instagram that the band "had a deadline which we failed to meet," suggesting that the band wasn't able to finish the album by the end of the month, whilst also adding that they had just completed a song that had been left unfinished for a year. In June, Manson affirmed recording for the album was finished and just needed to get mixed, with a possible release date slated for summer or second half of 2025. In July, Vig affirmed the band had plans to start mixing the album in September and release it in April 2025. In August, Garbage were forced to cancel all their shows for the remainder of the year due to an injury sustained by Manson. Therefore, they prioritized finishing the album. On November 7, Manson announced that the band had just finished mixing the album. Two days later, another post followed: "Yesterday I sat down to listen to our new record from start to finish [...] And was overwhelmed with nothing but gratitude. [...] we so look forward to sharing our most current work with you all very soon."

== Composition ==
=== Lyrics ===
Manson said the album would represent a shift compared to the band's previous efforts, being less socio-political, abrasive and aggressive, and more optimistic than No Gods No Masters: "As a society, we’ve become so beaten down and broken-hearted. I’m trying to reach for something that’s a little bigger than me, because if I don’t then I’m going to drown in my own dismay", adding "It’s a searchlight, this record. After scorching the earth, we’re coming out of a filthy cave with a searchlight. We’re looking for shards of life and humanity," she told NME. She echoed this sentiment in the album's press release, saying that the idea behind the making of this record was "that when things feel dark, it’s best to try to seek out that which is light, that which feels loving and good." She later pointed out that to avoid depression due to personal and socio-political circumstances, she "had to enter, if you will, the metaphysical, philosophical world to maintain my balance in life. For the first time in my life, I practiced positive thinking." Manson clarified that while the record conveys an optimistic feeling, it is set against a backdrop of "horror and chaos" and explained that darkness is a constant in Garbage's music.

In a press statement, Manson highlighted that one of the themes of the album is the acceptance of human flaws and failures in the face of our mortality. "It’s hopeful. It’s very tender towards what it means to be a human being. Our flaws and our failures are still beautiful, even though we’re taught that they’re not. This is a tender, thrilling record about the fragility of life," she explained.

=== Music ===
In an interview with Manchester Evening News, Manson explained the album has "some great pop melodies": “there’s a lot more focus on the vocals and the harmonisations," she added. This was echoed in an early review by Paul Sinclair, who noted "[the band] dialled down some of the industrial textures to offer some fantastic melody-driven grunge-pop," whilst also adding "[it] has a pleasing lo-fi charm." The album has also been described as more cinematic than its predecessor.

In various instances, the band affirmed that the album retains quintessential Garbage elements whilst also being experimental: it was described as "unmistakably Garbage" in a press release, including "big angular guitars, precise, propulsive beats and cinematic soundscapes," whilst Vig affirmed it "pushes out some boundaries but still sounds like us." Sonic adventurism on the album was also documented on the band's social updates on the record, showing the use of unconventional instruments such as the Otamatone and the Glamour Box. Vig also noted that the political climate influenced production choices, such as using analog synths and sound design to convey "dystopian vibes".

=== Songs ===
Manson insisted "There's No Future in Optimism" be the opening track of the album. "It starts out with an anthemic call to arms, a clarion call. It’s pretty much a rallying cry to all likeminded people. If you are interested in meeting this world with love, if you are willing to invest in tenderness and not violence or hate, then we are with you. You should come with us", she added in the album's press release. She explained that the lyrics of the song don't reflect the sentiment suggested by its title, which was actually chosen by the rest of the band. The song was written in the aftermath of the murder of George Floyd, and Manson described how deeply affected she was by the footage of the police officer kneeling on Floyd's neck. In Los Angeles, the incident sparked massive protests and widespread unrest. "Above our house in Hollywood, there were helicopters flying all day, for days on end," she recalled. "It was a really precarious, chaotic, and terrifying time."

The title "Chinese Fire Horse" refers to a person born in the Year of the Horse under the Fire element in the Chinese zodiac. Born in 1966, Manson is a Fire Horse. Dealing with ageism, the song serves as a response to music journalists asking Manson when she is going to retire from music and was described as "an expletive-laden corker, with some brilliant, angular guitar work". On "Hold", Manson tried to implement a different vocal style.

"Have We Met (The Void)" was conceived by Vig in his home studio, while being inspired by director John Carpenter's movie themes. Manson wrote the lyrics about a personal incident where she discovered her partner was having an affair in Barcelona. The vocals were recorded while Manson was in bed recovering from hip surgery.

"Sisyphus", a dream pop song, refers in its title to the Greek myth of the Corinth king condemned to eternally rolling a massive boulder up a steep hill. It emerged from Manson's struggles with recovery from her hip replacement surgery in 2023 and combines them with prayers about people who are oppressed. A lyric of "Radical", a quiet, moody track with acoustic elements, gave the title to the album. "Love to Give", characterized as "dramatic" and "yearning," features timpani. In the song, Manson sings of unconditional love, which can exist even without reciprocation. "R U Happy Now", described as melodic and melancholic, is centered on the themes of regret and longing.

Love and mortality are the central themes of album closer "The Day That I Met God", which was described as the "opus on the record" by Manson. The song was conceived during the singer's recovery from hip replacement surgery in 2023. "It's really a song about mortality but it's also an expression of gratitude. Gratitude for getting older, gratitude for the longevity of our band, for good health, for the great mystery and for the ongoing, creative adventure of life", she added. The band decided to leave the demo vocals in the final mix to lend the song "added poingancy".

== Release ==
The album was officially announced on February 27, with pre-orders available on the band's official store and a new single "coming in the following weeks". The pre-orders included a CD edition, a pearl sunrise vinyl edition and a transparent neon orange vinyl edition. Pre-order on the official store offered a signed art print in limited supply. A test pressing of the vinyl edition limited to 100 copies sold out within minutes from the announcement. Barnes & Noble offered a limited exclusive transparent neon orange vinyl with signed art print. Similarly, Sound of Vinyl bundled the pearl sunrise vinyl with the signed art print limited to 300 copies in the UK. Amazon.co.uk offered the CD edition with a signed insert instead. Assai Records offered the album in both the neon orange and pearl sunrise formats as an Obi edition, accompanied by an exclusive Japanese inspired obi strip, limited to 150 copies for both.

To promote the album, Shirley Manson was interviewed on BBC Radio 6 Music's programme Journeys in Sound, aired on May 15. During the interview, clips of "Chinese Fire Horse" and "Hold" were previewed. "Chinese Fire Horse" and "The Day That I Met God" were previewed during the BBC Radio 4's programme Front Row interview, aired on May 21.

On May 29, the album was premiered on Virgin Radio Italia three hours before release. Garbage performed "There's No Future in Optimism" on Jimmy Kimmel Live on June 4. On July 14, "Hold" was B-listed on BBC Radio 6 Music.

=== Singles ===
"There's No Future in Optimism" was announced as the lead single from the album by Vig in an interview with Portal ROCKline. A short video featuring the animated cover art of the album and the preview of the track was uploaded to the band's socials in conjunction with the album announcement. The band rehearsed the track with the intention to play it on their 2025 Latin American tour dates, however their manager forbade them from performing any new song before being released. The single was released on April 9 with a music video directed by Benjy Kirkman and a premiere on BBC Radio 6 Music's Huw Stephens' show. On May 9, "Get Out My Face AKA Bad Kitty" was released as the second single from the album.

=== Tour ===
On September 26, 2024, Garbage announced a six-date headline South American tour in March 2025, with L7 as special guests in Brazil. Garbage began the rehearsals for the tour on February 24 and was joined by Nicole Fiorentino on bass. They also performed at Rock en Conce on March 25. Following the South American tour, Garbage played a headline concert in Zapopan, Mexico, on April 4, and are set to perform at Pa'l Norte in Monterrey on April 6. The Latin American dates were a best of tour, as the band did not perform any new material.

On May 17, the band performed at the Cruel World Festival, playing "There's No Future In Optimism" live for the first time. On October 21, 2024, My Chemical Romance announced Garbage will be the special guests on the August 2, 2025 date of their Long Live The Black Parade tour in Arlington, Texas. The band will also join the lineup of Minnesota Yacht Club festival in summer 2025.

On March 25, 2025, the band announced Happy Endings, a 31-date North American headline tour with Starcrawler as special guests. On June 2, the band extended the tour with five more dates, including one in Mexico.

== Reception ==
=== Critical response ===
Professional ratings
Aggregate scores
Source	Rating
Metacritic	80/100
Review scores
Source	Rating
Classic Rock	3.5/5 stars
Far Out	3.5/5 stars
Kerrang!	3/5
The Line of Best Fit	4/5 stars
Mojo	4/5 stars
MusicOMH	3.5/5 stars
NME	5/5 stars
Pitchfork	6.4/10
Record Collector	3/5 stars
Uncut	4/5 stars

The album has received generally favorable reviews by critics. At Metacritic, which assigns a weighted average score out of 100 to reviews and ratings from mainstream critics, the album has received a metascore of 80, based on 13 critic reviews. Paul Sinclair wrote a positive early review of the album on Super Deluxe Edition, calling it "a real return to form" and "the group's best collection of songs since the original era."

In a perfect score review of the album, Liberty Dunworth of NME wrote that the band "welcomes a brighter new chapter. Shirley Manson's gang channel a more optimistic outlook, and display some of their most profound songwriting to date." Simon Heavisides of The Line of Best Fit awarded the album an 8/10 score, who opined that Garbage "offer love and optimism" in an album that "rocks righteously". Andy Von Pip of Under the Radar described in his review that "it's a mature, profoundly human album, weathered but unbroken, scarred yet still yearning. Garbage haven’t mellowed but they have evolved. And in doing so, they’ve delivered one of the most emotionally powerful records of their career." Johnny Sharp complimented the uplifting nature of the record in his review for Uncut, pointing out, "even when the sonic mood broods on "Radical", the optimistic sentiments (quoted in the album title) reflect a creative force in rude health." James McNair gave the album four stars out of five on Mojo, remarking "anger's still an energy but so are joy and gratitude." Kelly Scanlon of Far Out thought that the band continues to "thrive through the dark with such finesse and charm".

Terry Staunton was less enthusiastic in his review on Record Collector, giving the album three stars out of five, and saying, "these 10 tracks will undoubtedly please longterm fans, even if there’s little here that doesn't revisit already well-trodden ground." However, he singled out "The Day That I Met God" as "an epic six-minute fever dream offering proof that the drugs do work." Similarly, Steve Beebee of Kerrang! also gave the album a 3/5 score, noting that "while not quite the box of delights Garbage shook at us last time, there's persistent allure in the mating of cavernous soundscapes with Shirley's penetratingly icy vocals. It's more than enough to keep this most distinctive of outfits in the alt-rock fast lane."

The album was included in their respective lists of best albums of 2025 so far by Spin and The Times.

=== Commercial performance ===
On the midweek albums chart update in the United Kingdom, the album debuted at number two behind Something Beautiful by Miley Cyrus. With 4,071 copies sold, it eventually debuted on the official albums charts in the United Kingdom at number twenty-four, number two on the UK Albums Sales Charts and number one on the UK Independent Albums Charts. In Manson's native Scotland, the album debuted at number two. It became their first studio album not to chart within the Billboard 200 albums charts in the United States. It did, however, debut at number 38 on the US Billboard Independent Albums, at number eight on the Top Album Sales and at number four on the Top Current Album Sales charts.

== Track listing ==
All tracks are written by Garbage.

No.	Title	Length
1.	"There's No Future in Optimism"	3:20
2.	"Chinese Fire Horse"	4:03
3.	"Hold"	4:33
4.	"Have We Met (The Void)"	5:11
5.	"Sisyphus"	5:11
6.	"Radical"	4:20
7.	"Love to Give"	4:24
8.	"Get Out My Face AKA Bad Kitty"	4:36
9.	"R U Happy Now"	3:39
10.	"The Day That I Met God"	5:59
Total length:		45:16

== Personnel ==
Credits adapted from Tidal and Apple Music.

=== Garbage ===
- Shirley Manson – lead vocals
- Duke Erikson – guitars, keyboards, backing vocals
- Steve Marker – guitars, backing vocals
- Butch Vig – drums, guitars, keyboards, backing vocals

=== Additional contributors ===
- Garbage – production
- Billy Bush – production, engineering, mixing
- Heba Kadry – mastering
- Shruti Kumar – keyboards and synthesizer on "The Day That I Met God"

== Charts ==
Chart performance for Let All That We Imagine Be the Light
Chart (2025)	Peak position
Australian Albums (ARIA)	87
Austrian Albums (Ö3 Austria)	10
Belgian Albums (Ultratop Flanders)	80
Belgian Albums (Ultratop Wallonia)	17
Croatian International Albums (HDU)	22
French Albums (SNEP)	104
French Rock & Metal Albums (SNEP)	7
German Albums (Offizielle Top 100)	17
Scottish Albums (Official Charts)	2
Spanish Albums (PROMUSICAE)	84
Swiss Albums (Schweizer Hitparade)	24
UK Albums (Official Charts)	24
UK Independent Albums (Official Charts)	1
US Top Album Sales (Billboard)	8
