= There's No Future in Optimism =

Single by Garbage

from the album Let All That We Imagine Be the Light
- Released: April 9, 2025
- Recorded: 2022–2024
- Genre: Alternative rock, electronic rock
- Length: 3:20
- Label: BMG; Stunvolume
- Songwriters: Shirley Manson, Steve Marker, Duke Erikson, Butch Vig
- Producers: Garbage, Billy Bush

Garbage singles chronology
"Witness to Your Love" (2022)	"There's No Future in Optimism" (2025)	"Get Out My Face AKA Bad Kitty" (2025)

Music video
- "There's No Future in Optimism" on YouTube

"There's No Future in Optimism" is a song by American rock band Garbage. It was released as the lead single from Garbage's eighth studio album, Let All That We Imagine Be the Light, on April 9, 2025.

== Background and composition ==
"There's No Future in Optimism" was written by Garbage and produced by Garbage and the band's engineer, Billy Bush. It's an alternative rock track with electronic elements.

Lead singer Shirley Manson stated that she was immediately drawn to the title, which had been suggested by the other members of the band. Although she decided to keep the title as it was, the lyrics were written as a deliberate counterpoint to its pessimistic tone, "because if we allow our fatalism or our negativity to really take over, we will crumble," she conceded.

The song was written in the aftermath of the murder of George Floyd and is set in a contemporary Los Angeles during the protests against police violence. "Above our house in Hollywood, there were helicopters all day long, for days on end. It was really precarious, chaotic and terrifying," Manson added.

Manson was adamant the track be the opener of the album as a statement of intent of the entire record: "it starts out with an anthemic call to arms, a clarion call. It’s pretty much a rallying cry to all likeminded people. If you are interested in meeting this world with love, if you are willing to invest in tenderness and not violence or hate, then we are with you. You should come with us," she told in a press statement. The pro-active sentiment behind the song is also a reflection of Manson's thoughts about the power of music and art to impact culture and shape society: "even though all the pointers in our society say otherwise, I do feel music still has the power to shift atoms, shift thinking and shift positions," she emphasized.

== Release and promotion ==
The song was first teased in a short video announcing the album's release on February 27, 2025. It was announced as the lead single from the album by drummer Butch Vig in an interview with Portal ROCKline. The band rehearsed the track with the intention to play it on their 2025 Latin American tour, however their manager prevented them to perform any new song before being released.

On April 7, the band announced the release of the track and its music video for April 9. The song premiered on BBC Radio 6 Music's Huw Stephens' show at 5 PM BST. Garbage debuted the track live on Jimmy Kimmel Live! on June 4, 2025. Later that year, the song opened the concerts of the Happy Endings North American and Australian tours.

== Music video ==
The music video, directed by Benjy Kirkman, premiered on YouTube at the same time as the single. The cinematic black-and-white video, starring actors Aderayo Adenekan and Michaela Madziova, presents dystopian imagery that reflects the song’s themes, depicting a city in chaos and symbolizing the search for hope amid despair.

== Reception ==
In an early review for Let All That We Imagine Be the Light, blogger Paul Sinclair wrote on SuperDeluxeEdition that the song "has a title that doesn’t exactly roll off the tongue, but it has a insistent earworm of a refrain in 'If you’re ready for love'."

Under the Radar selected it as the fifth best song of the week.
