= Los Angeles riots =

Los Angeles riots or protests may refer to:

- 1992 Los Angeles riots, following the acquittal of police officers accused of using excessive force against Rodney King
- Watts riots, of 1965, following an arrest for drunk driving in the Watts neighborhood of Los Angeles
- Zoot Suit Riots, in 1943, between Anglo servicemen stationed in the city, and Latino youths
- George Floyd protests in Los Angeles County, California in 2020
- June 2025 Los Angeles protests following arrests of undocumented immigrants by U.S. Federal officers
