= Killing of Andres Guardado =

2020 fatal shooting

- Approximate location of the incident in Los Angeles County.
- Date: June 18, 2020
- Time: 17:52 - 17:53
- Location: West Rancho Dominguez, California; 33°53′34″N 118°16′51.5″W
- Type: Shooting
- Participants: Miguel Vega; Chris Hernandez
- Deaths: Andrés Guardado

Andres Guardado (November 3, 2001 – June 18, 2020) was an 18-year-old Salvadoran-American man shot in the back and killed by a deputy sheriff from the Los Angeles County Sheriff's Department on June 18, 2020, in the unincorporated community of West Rancho Dominguez, California, just outside of the Harbor Gateway section of the City of Los Angeles. Guardado ran from two uniformed police officers into an alley, where he died after being shot by deputies. Seven shots were fired and Guardado was hit in the upper torso. Police say that Guardado produced a handgun during the chase. Investigators do not believe it was fired. Accounts of the incident are disputed between police and witnesses. Police stated they were searching for footage of the incident. Store-owner Andrew Heney reported that several cameras at the scene, including a digital video recorder that stored surveillance footage, were taken and destroyed by police.

Local protests emerged in response to the killing of Guardado and involved protestors and media reporters being tear gassed and shot by rubber bullets at the sheriff's station in Compton. The incident was widely reported as the second police killing involving the Los Angeles County Sheriff's Department deputies within two days of one another, the other being Terron Jammal Boone, who was identified as the half-brother of 24-year-old Robert Fuller. Guardado's death came in the wake of the murder of George Floyd and subsequent protests. In November 2020, the L.A. county coroner's office ordered an inquest to be conducted in the case. This was the first inquest ordered in the county in over thirty years and was noted to be a challenge against the power of county law enforcement.

== Background ==
Photo of Andres Guardado

Guardado's family had fled violence and political instability in El Salvador from the Salvadoran Civil War. Guardado lived with his family in Koreatown, Los Angeles and had recently graduated high school. He was working two jobs and was a student at Los Angeles Trade-Technical College to become a registered electrician or mechanic. He was described by friends and family as fun-loving and optimistic.

Guardado worked as an unlicensed security guard for Street Dynamic Auto Body in West Rancho Dominguez. The Bureau of Security and Investigative Services, which licenses security guards in the state of California, show no records in the Department of Consumer Affairs database of Guardado being licensed to work security. Being younger than twenty-one, Guardado did not hold a firearms permit to be an armed security guard.

== Incident ==
Police accounts of the incident relay that at 5:52 p.m. on June 18 two officers from the Compton Sheriff's station made contact with Guardado. They were reportedly out on patrol when they saw Guardado talking to someone in a car blocking a driveway, so they stopped their vehicle. Police say that Guardado ran away and allegedly produced a firearm at some point in the chase, although this is disputed by his family and employer. The chase was taken southbound on Redondo Beach Blvd. and through a nearby alleyway.

At around 5:53 p.m., Guardado was shot at six times by one or multiple sheriff's deputies and hit in the upper body. Guardado died on scene. Store-owner Andrew Heney stated that Guardado "got down on his knees and surrendered with his hands behind his head but was still shot seven times in the back." The shooting occurred near a business located in the 400 block of Redondo Beach Boulevard near S. Figueroa Street. A gun was reportedly recovered on the scene. The gun recovered at the scene was a privately made firearm with a standard capacity magazine. Both of those are felonies in the state of California. It was unclear what "prompted the use of force" and what Guardado was "suspected of" to initially prompt the chase.

Heney stated, "the police came up, and they pulled their guns on him and he ran because he was scared, and they shot and killed him. He’s got a clean background and everything. There’s no reason." A witness on the scene stated, "I turned around and saw two male white officers running up into the body shop where not even less than a second later I heard rapid gunshots, [I heard] about four to five shots fired [and] never heard them say ‘freeze’. I never once heard them say 'stop.' Nothing like that."

The deputies reportedly were not wearing body cameras. Lt. Charles Calderaro stated that deputies "are hoping to find surveillance video from nearby businesses." The sheriff's officers are accused of destroying several cameras at the scene and taking possession of the DVR that stored footage filmed by the surveillance cameras. In an interview, Heney is quoted as saying that the deputies "illegally got into everything, then they had the place locked down and then they got the warrant.".

== Reactions ==
=== Community ===
A small group, including Guardado's family, quickly gathered on scene after he was shot and killed. The scene became intense when family members showed up and became distraught at the news of Guardado's death. Deputies could be seen "shoving people away, including a man carrying a child."

Family and local activists were devastated and outraged by the incident, who state that Guardado was shot in the back several times by the police. His sister, Jennifer Guardado, stated: "Even if this is the last day I breathe, I'm not holding this back because I feel it in my soul that my brother was murdered, and this was covered up." Prominent Los Angeles activist Najee Ali referred to the killing as an execution and "a continuation of the L.A. County sheriff's murdering black and brown men." Ali stated that "he ran away because he did what all young Black and Latino men do sometimes when they see the police: They run. They run because they're scared for their lives. They run because they know their lives might be at risk, and he knew exactly what was gonna happen. And sure enough, he died."

By Friday June 19, "a makeshift memorial for Guardado grew outside the store where he worked, with people stopping by to hang posters and leave flowers and candles." A protest was organized by Union del Barrio. Stanley Leiba, Guardado's childhood friend stated "You expect kids you grow up with to live forever."

On June 21, about 500 people showed up at the intersection of Figueroa Street and West Redondo Beach Boulevard to protest. One person stated, "We are marching because we're tired of this corruption. We know that boy was no threat. Black lives matter. Brown lives matter. We are going to keep marching until justice is served." Salvadoran flags were waved at the protest while protestors chanted "Why'd you kill that kid?" Protestors were reportedly tear gassed and shot with rubber bullets after tensions heightened. Six people were arrested.

=== Government ===
Compton City Attorney Damon Brown reported that the city sent a letter to the sheriff's department, "demanding that it remove the involved deputies from the Compton station and replace them with "officers who would treat our residents with the respect and dignity that they deserve.'"

Congresswoman Nanette Barragán and Maxine Waters called upon Xavier Becerra, the Attorney General of California, to conduct a full independent investigation into the shooting. In a joint statement, the congresswomen stated, "Another day and another Black or Brown kid has been shot in the back by police. These killings must stop. We demand it. The American people demand it ... Change must come now. For weeks, the American people and the world have marched to demand accountability, put an end to aggressive and violent police tactics and equal justice for Black and Brown communities. We must show them their pleas are being heard. Now. That begins with making sure we get justice for Andres Guardado." This was described as an expression of Black-brown unity.

At a press event, Los Angeles County Sheriff Alex Villanueva spoke out against conducting an independent investigation, stating "that the attorney general's office did not have the resources to investigate every shooting." LA County Supervisor Mark Ridley-Thomas also called for an independent investigation, supported by the Guardado family.

=== Press reports and public statements ===
Los Angeles Times investigative reporters wrote the two deputies who were involved in the chase and shooting were Miguel Vega, who opened fire, and Chris Hernandez, who did not shoot. Vega has a history of allegations, mostly unproven or yet to be resolved, including tampering with evidence, making false statements to investigators (an action for which he was given a four-day suspension) and complaints for use of unreasonable force.

Neither officer has yet given a statement to investigators and have separate attorneys representing them, according to the LA Times report.

CNN reported that Vega's lawyer is most often associated with the policeman's union in Los Angeles. Neither officer has yet officially given a reason for the use of deadly force, although Hernandez' lawyer Tom You has told CNN that Andres Guardado was prone on the ground when he was shot. The lawyer claims Hernandez told investigators the following: "Guardado prones out, he's on the ground but he has access to his firearm. My client can see (only) half of Guardado's body because his view is blocked by a wall. Because Guardado is not listening to commands and reaches for the firearm, Vega is in fear for his life."

According to reports from the Los Angeles Times, the homicide investigators requested a security hold on the autopsy until all interviews were completed. Panish Shea & Boyle, the law firm representing Andres Guardado's family released a statement demanding the release of Andres Guardado's autopsy results after the Los Angeles Sheriff's Department placed a security hold on them. The coroner's office as well as an independent autopsy determined Guardado's cause of death was multiple gunshot wounds and the manner of death was certified as homicide. The final autopsy also showed that Guardado was shot in the back five times.

== Autopsy reports ==
An "emergency hold" was placed on the autopsy report by Sheriff Villanueva, preventing the release of details pending the conclusion of the investigation conducted by the Homicide division of the LASD. An independent autopsy released by Guardado's family shows Andres Guardado was shot 5 times in the back.

== Coroner's inquest ==
On November 10, 2020, the L.A. county coroner's office ordered an inquest which was previously voted on by the L.A. County Board of Supervisors in September. The inquest will be conducted by Court of Appeals Justice Candace Cooper and will begin on November 30. It is notably the first inquest to occur in the county in over thirty years. Dr. Jonathan Lucas, who is the county’s chief medical examiner-coroner, stated "an inquest ensures that our residents will have an independent review of all the evidence and findings of our office and of the cause and manner of death of Mr. Guardado.” Supervisor Mark Ridley-Thomas stated:

For far too long we have accepted the status quo — we haven’t sufficiently challenged law enforcement’s incessant demands that investigations remain shrouded in secrecy. This board must not sit by and allow the county’s law enforcement department to entrench itself in traditional patterns of behavior that profoundly harm not only vulnerable communities but the entire justice system.

== Suspension, lawsuit ==
According to the LA Times, in April 2020 partners Vega and Hernandez were involved in an incident that eventually led to an investigation and suspension, but not until six months had past, and the death of Guardado happened. A 24 year-old skateboarder had vocally defended other younger skaters as the Deputies verbally abused them, and says he was placed quickly into the back seat of the patrol car, unhandcuffed and without a seat belt. A car wreck ensued when Vega drove at excessive speed chasing other kids on bicycles through an alley causing injury requiring hospitalization and stitches. A lawsuit claiming the Deputies were abusive, threatening and reckless was filed, and a LASD investigation quickly led to the two being taken off patrol duty. Sheriff Villanueva was named in lawsuit for his negligence in supervision, and a court decision upheld his inclusion.

== Whistleblower ==
According to a sworn testimony of a whistle blower, Guardado was murdered by the police as part of an initiation into a violent police gang within the department, The Compton Executioners. The same whistle blower had previously filed a complaint regarding the existence of this gang.

== Eyewitness surfaces ==
In April 2021, a college newspaper published a story with an interview identifying the eyewitness driving the white Lexus parked at the curb of the alley where Guardado was chased and shot. She claims the deputy chasing Andres fired his pistol on the run, and to have seen that Andres was unarmed. "He never pulled out a gun, when he was running," the witness is quoted, continuing "That's when they start shooting." Additionally, she claims to have witnessed two separate volleys of pistol fire, one on the run that caused Andres to fall to the ground and a second that she only heard as she drove away. (The self-defense story related to the press by Vega's attorney differs from this strongly, claiming all shots were fired after Guardado was prone on the ground.)

The same student newspaper story also says that the witness was arrested around August 1 by Compton-based LASD deputies near her home in Hawthorne but that she was carried to a Sheriff's station in Lakewood instead, some sixteen miles away from the nearest station house where she was held for two days and questioned by LASD detectives, whom she claims tried to intimidate her into changing her statement. "They were trying to press me, like saying I've seen Andres with guns before and there's pictures of him. They tried to come at me stupid, like scientifically, they can prove that's not what happened."

This witness was never identified publicially by LASD and so was not called to the Coroner's inquest. The April 2021 story has not been followed up on by other media as of the one-year anniversary of the shooting and the LASD has not announced any end to their investigation, having previously claimed it was still open, "ongoing" pending finding all the witnesses.

== Settlement paid ==
In November 2022, the Los Angeles Board of Supervisors approved an $8 million settlement to be paid Guardado's family.
