= Copy/Paste (album) =

Compilation album by Garbage
- Released: November 29, 2024
- Recorded: 1995–2024
- Studios: Smart Studios, Madison, Wisconsin; Red Razor Sounds, Atwater Village, California; GrungeIsDead, Los Angeles, California; Ocean Way, Nashville, Tennessee; EastWest, Hollywood, California
- Label: BMG
- Producer: Garbage

Garbage chronology
Lie to Me (2024)	Copy/Paste (2024)	Let All That We Imagine Be the Light (2025)

Copy/Paste is a compilation album by American rock band Garbage released on November 29, 2024, as part of Record Store Day's Black Friday event. The album repackages cover versions of ten classic songs, performed by Garbage, and includes a previously unreleased cover, "Love My Way". An abridged version of the album was released digitally on December 6.

== Background ==
Copy/Paste was first hinted at on September 29, 2024, when Garbage teased the album on their Instagram stories. The official announcement followed on October 2, 2024, as part of the Record Store Day Black Friday lineup.

Curated by Garbage, Copy/Paste features cover versions of ten classic songs originally performed by influential artists such as David Bowie, Ramones, Patti Smith, U2, Big Star, The Jam, Siouxsie and the Banshees, Psychedelic Furs, The Velvet Underground, Tim Buckley and This Mortal Coil. While most of the tracks have appeared on previous releases, "Love My Way" is a new addition, being previously unreleased.

Artwork was created by Marcin Pospiech, who had previously made the visualizer for "Song to the Siren".

== Content ==
"Butterfly Collector", originally released as a b-side to the "Queer" CD single (1995), was then remastered and included in the 2015 deluxe edition of Garbage. "Thirteen" was the b-side to the "Push It" single in 1998 and was also included in the 2018 reissue of Version 2.0. "Candy Says" was released as b-side to the "Breaking Up the Girl" single in 2002 and included in the reissue of Beautiful Garbage in 2021. "I Just Want to Have Something to Do", recorded in 2002, was first released on We're A Happy Family: A Tribute to Ramones; it was then utilised as b-side to the "Why Do You Love Me" single in 2005 and featured on the 2024 remastered reissue of Bleed Like Me.

"Who's Gonna Ride Your Wild Horses", originally recorded for the AHK-toong BAY-bi Covered compilation in 2011, is one of two tracks on Copy/Paste that hasn't previously appeared on a Garbage release. "Because the Night", "Starman", "Cities in Dust", and "Song to the Siren" were released as part of Record Store Day exclusives between 2013 and 2024. The first two tracks were also included in the deluxe edition of Garbage's seventh album, No Gods No Masters.

We recorded all of the covers featured on this record over the span of nearly three decades. We hold deep respect for all of the artists featured here whose music changed, inspired and thrilled us all. Sincere love and gratitude for the immaculate songwriting and undying artistry.

— Garbage, Copy/Paste liner notes

Other Garbage covers were left off from this compilation, namely: "Kick My Ass", "Can't Seem to Make You Mine", "Wild Horses", "Pride (In the Name of Love)" and "Where Do the Children Play?". However, in multiple instances the band referred to Copy/Paste as the "Volume 1", alluding to the fact there would be other cover collections in the future.

== Release and promotion ==
Copy/Paste is a Record Store Day exclusive, pressed on coloured vinyl and limited to 3,200 copies in the United States. On November 30, the band anticipated on their social media that it would be unlikely to release the record digitally in its entirety due to issues with their distribution company in the United States. On December 3, a digital edition titled copy/paste, vol 1. (abridged) was announced for a release due on December 6. The digital EP contains only the six tracks released after the band's 2005–2009 hiatus.

== Track listing ==
Copy/Paste LP
No.	Title	Writer(s)	Original artist	Length
1.	"Starman" (from the "Destroying Angels" 7" single, 2018)	David Bowie	David Bowie	4:08
2.	"Butterfly Collector" (from the "Queer" CD single, 1995)	Paul Weller	The Jam	3:42
3.	"Who's Gonna Ride Your Wild Horses" (from AHK-toong BAY-bi Covered, 2011)	Adam Clayton; David Evans; Paul Hewson; Larry Mullen Jr.	U2	5:17
4.	"Thirteen" (from the "Push It" CD single, 1998)	Chris Bell; Alex Chilton	Big Star	3:30
5.	"Song to the Siren" (from the Lie to Me EP, 2024)	Larry Beckett; Tim Buckley	Tim Buckley	4:16
6.	"Love My Way" (previously unreleased track)	John Ashton; Tim Butler; Richard Butler; Vince Ely	The Psychedelic Furs	4:41
7.	"Cities in Dust" (from the Witness to Your Love EP, 2023)	Susan Ballion; Peter Edward Clarke; Steven Severin	Siouxsie and the Banshees	4:21
8.	"Candy Says" (from the "Breaking Up the Girl" CD single, 2001)	Sterling Morrison; Lou Reed; Maureen Tucker; Doug Yule	The Velvet Underground	4:02
9.	"I Just Want to Have Something to Do" (from We're a Happy Family: A Tribute to Ramones, 2003)	Douglas Colvin; John Cummings; Jeffrey Hyman	Ramones	2:26
10.	"Because the Night" (from the "Because the Night" 7" single, 2013)	Patti Smith; Bruce Springsteen	Patti Smith Group	4:59

copy/paste, vol.1 (abridged) EP
No.	Title	Length
1.	"Starman"	4:08
2.	"Who's Gonna Ride Your Wild Horses"	5:17
3.	"Song to the Siren"	4:16
4.	"Love My Way"	4:41
5.	"Cities in Dust"	4:21
6.	"Because the Night"	4:59

== Personnel ==
=== Garbage ===
- Shirley Manson – vocals
- Steve Marker – guitar, loops, bass, keyboards, samples
- Duke Erikson – piano, guitar, bass, keyboards
- Butch Vig – drums, loops, additional noises

=== Additional musicians ===
- Justin Meldal-Johnsen – bass
- Daniel Shulman – bass
- Beth Halper – backing vocals
- Marissa Paternoster – vocals, guitar
- Jarrett Dougherty – drums
- Michael Abbate – bass

=== Technical ===
- Garbage – production, mixing (tracks 2, 4, 9)
- Billy Bush – engineering, mixing (tracks 1, 3, 5–8, 10)
- Heba Kadry – mastering
- Howie Weinberg – additional engineering
- Scott Hull – additional engineering
- Mike Zirkel – additional engineering
- Brendan Dekora – additional engineering
- Joe LaPorta – additional engineering
- Emily Lazar – additional engineering
- Marcin Pospiech – artwork
- Ryan Corey – design

== Charts ==
Chart performance for Copy/Paste
Chart (2024)	Peak position
Scottish Albums (Official Charts)	42
UK Independent Albums (Official Charts)	37
UK Record Store Chart (OCC)	15
