= Get Out My Face AKA Bad Kitty =

Single by Garbage

from the album Let All That We Imagine Be the Light
- Released: May 9, 2025
- Recorded: 2022–2024
- Genre: Alternative rock
- Length: 4:36
- Label: BMG; Stunvolume
- Songwriters: Shirley Manson, Steve Marker, Duke Erikson, Butch Vig
- Producers: Garbage, Billy Bush

Garbage singles chronology
"There's No Future in Optimism" (2025)	"Get Out My Face AKA Bad Kitty" (2025)

"Get Out My Face AKA Bad Kitty" is a song by American rock band Garbage. It was released as the second single from Garbage's eighth studio album, Let All That We Imagine Be the Light, on May 9, 2025.

== Background and composition ==
"Get Out My Face AKA Bad Kitty" is an alternative rock track, featuring "driving bass and '90s inspired guitars." The track follows the politically-charged lead single "There's No Future In Optimism" and continues the band’s engagement with socio-political issues.

The song originated from a demo the band sent frontwoman Shirley Manson initially titled "AKA Bad Kitty". She described the song as a response to what she sees as a growing regression in women's rights in the United States, referring to it as part of an "absolute war on women." Manson revealed that the song was inspired by her increasing awareness of patriarchy and systemic inequality, particularly as she has grown older and become more conscious of societal double standards affecting women, minorities, and marginalized communities. "As you get older, you start to see how things are stacked up against some of us – not all of us. I am outraged by the way the world treats blacks and browns and gays and trans peoples and animals and women," she commented.

== Release and promotion ==
The track was released as the second single from Garbage's eighth studio album, Let All That We Imagine Be the Light, on May 9, 2025 with no previous announcement.

== Reception ==
Under the Radar named "Get Out My Face AKA Bad Kitty" the 8th best song of the week on May 9.
