= George Floyd protests in California =

2020 civil unrest after the murder of George Floyd

- Part of George Floyd protests
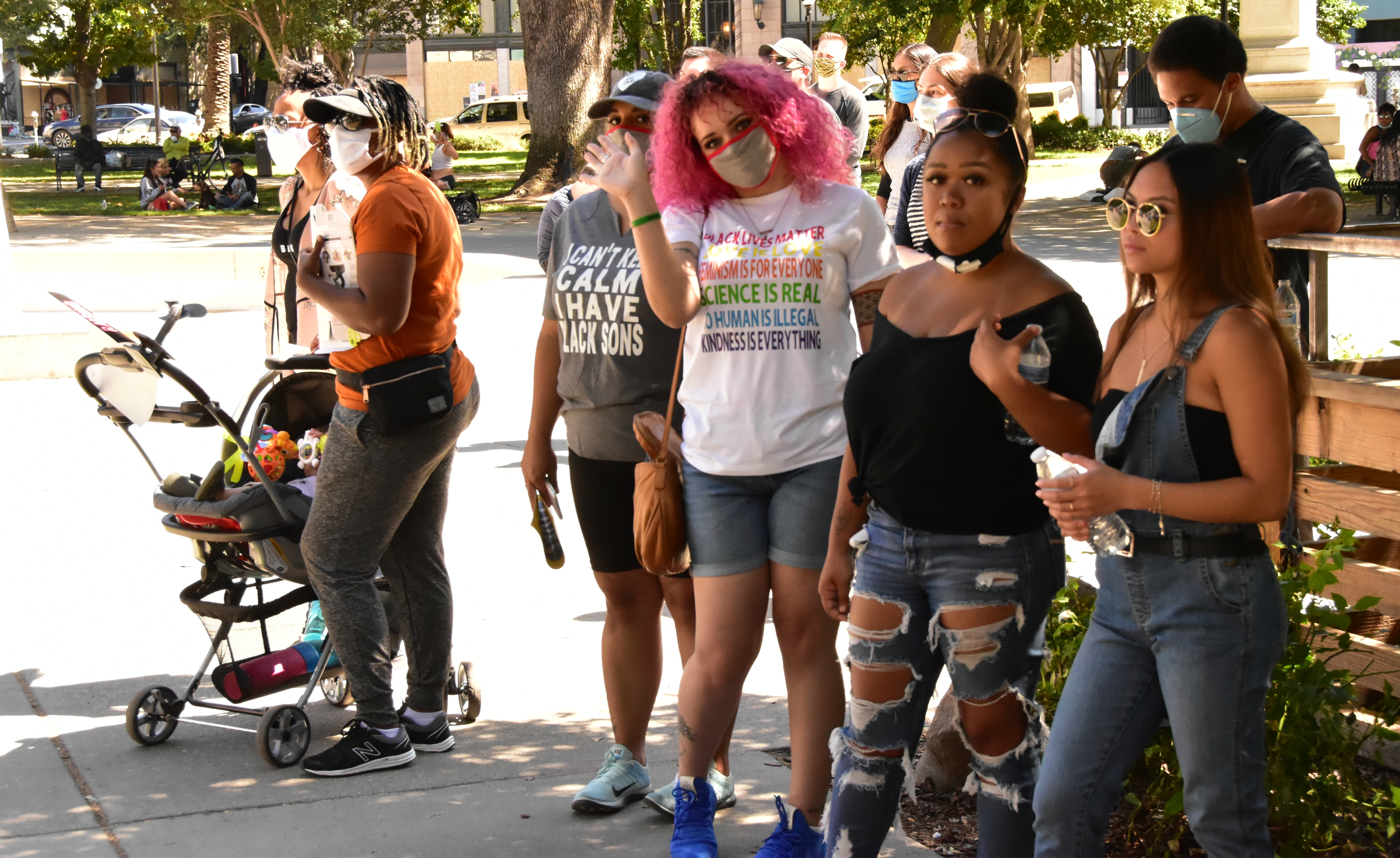
- Protest in Sacramento on June 7
- Date: May 28, 2020 – May 26, 2021 (11 months and 4 weeks)
- Location: California, United States
- Caused by: Police brutality; Institutional racism against African Americans; Reaction to the murder of George Floyd; Economic, racial and social inequality

Casualties
- Deaths: 2

Cities in California in which a protest with about 100 or more participants was held

In 2020, a series of protests took place in California related to the murder of George Floyd on May 25, 2020, in Minneapolis, Minnesota, while in police custody. On May 31, 2020, the California Department of Human Resources advised "all state departments with offices in downtown city areas" to close on June 1.

== Northern California ==
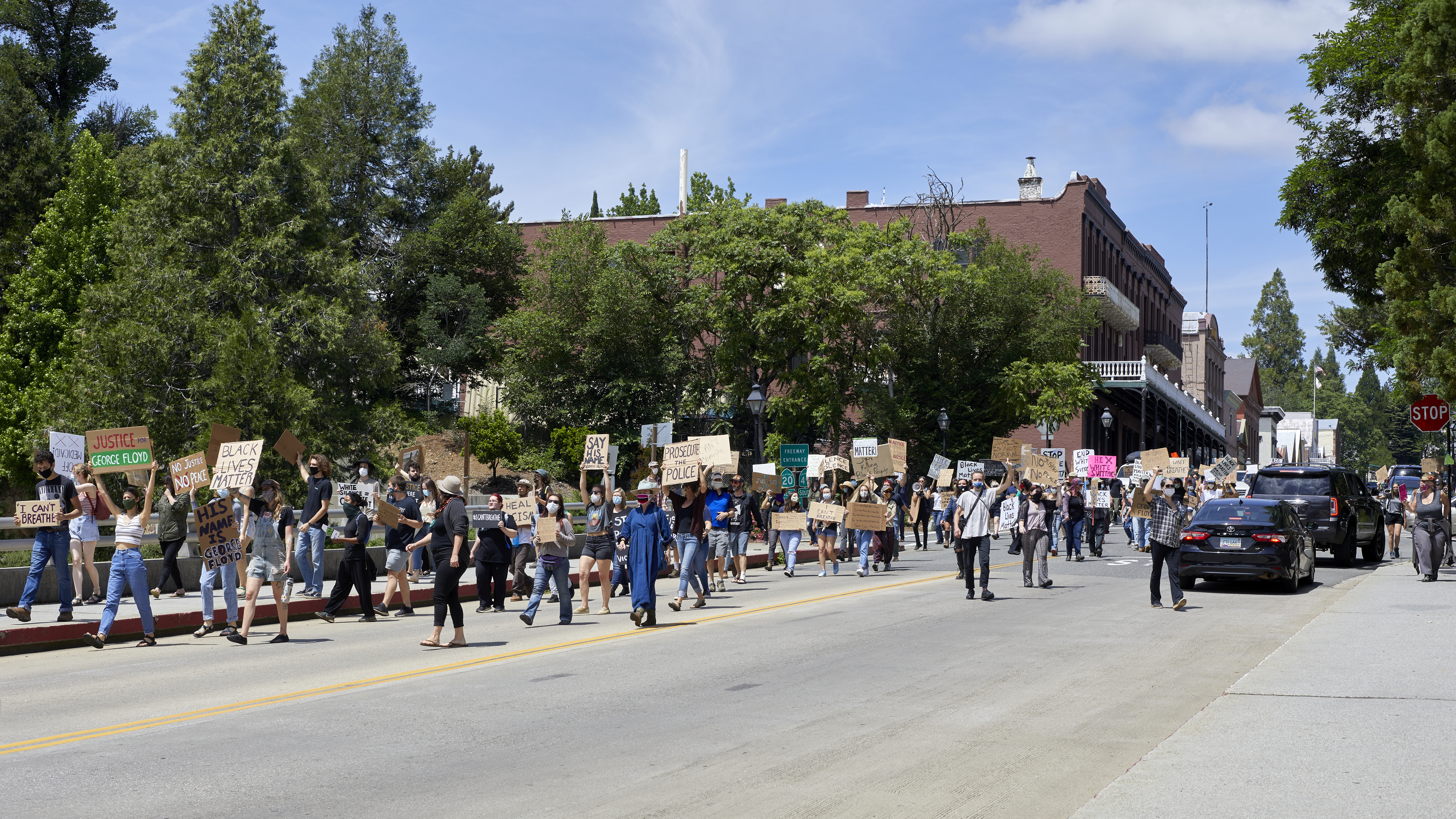
Protest in Nevada City on May 31

'Volunteers Sweep Up Cities Morning After Protests' - video news report from Voice of America

- Arcata: About 200 protesters marched around the plaza on June 1.
- Chico: Protesters gathered for five days in a row. A protest on June 5 had over 500 attendees.
- Citrus Heights: Over a hundred people protested outside Citrus Heights City Hall on June 13 and 14.
- Davis: Roughly 100 UC Davis students held protests in downtown Davis on May 30. The Davis Police Department station was vandalized.
- Elk Grove: A group of around 20 people protested and held signs for several days during the first week of June at Laguna Boulevard and Bruceville Road.
- Eureka: Hundreds protested in the streets near the courthouse on May 30. Two different cars drove into demonstrators.
- Folsom: On June 1, hundreds joined at the Folsom Library to march to Folsom City Hall and the police station. The protests continued throughout Old Town Folsom.
- Fort Bragg: Hundreds of protesters gathered on June 2 to condemn police brutality and racial inequality. The protest was entirely peaceful and the police department expressed its condolences to the family of George Floyd.
- Gridley: Around 80 people gathered at the corner of Hwy 99 and Magnolia St on June 7 to support Black Lives Matter. Protesters held signs and chanted as they marched north and south along Hwy 99.
- Kings Beach: On July 21, more than 50 protesters picketed an ice cream shop after the owner made online threats against a Black Lives Matter protester in nearby Reno, Nevada.
- Lake Tahoe: Vigils and protests were held at Lakeview Commons for three nights from May 30 through June 1. They continued through June 5.
- Lakeport: On June 5, about 50 protesters gathered on Main Street to protest police violence.
- Marysville: On May 31, dozens attended a vigil at Ellis Lake.
- Middletown: On June 3, over 100 demonstrators gathered along Highway 29 to peacefully protest the murder of George Floyd.
- Monterey: Hundreds gathered at Window on the Bay beach on May 30. Protesters remained distant from each other while they lined Del Monte Avenue and passing drivers honked their support.
- Oroville: On May 31, protesters marched from Municipal Auditorium on Myers Street through downtown Oroville and back to support Black Lives Matter and George Floyd, ending the protest with a moment of silence for eight minutes and forty-six seconds.
- Placerville: On June 2, around 80 people gathered on Main Street in downtown Placerville to peacefully protest the murder of George Floyd.
- Red Bluff: A peaceful protest was held on June 1, with more than 100 people involved.
- Redding: On May 29, a march started at Martin Luther King Jr. Center and then down Court Street. On June 2, organizers of a march schedule for Tuesday cancelled the event citing safety concerns, limited police availability and the specter of a "militia group" of counter-protesters. A crowd of at least 100 gathered at the Kohl's parking lot chanting "You can't stop the revolution." Counterprotesters wearing combat boots and camouflage gathered across the street. Redding Police Chief Bill Schueller took a knee with protesters and officers marched "arms linked" with protesters. More than 1,500 people marched against racial injustice and police abuse in Redding on June 6.
- Roseville: A group of sixty people protested at a roundabout on June 15. During the protest a driver drove through the crowd, though no injuries were reported.
- Sacramento: Hundreds of people protested peacefully on Franklin Boulevard on May 29. A group of protesters jumped onto Highway 99 southbound at the 12th Avenue overpass and blocked traffic. On May 30 protesters blocked part of I-5 and marched downtown. On May 31, more protests took place in Downtown and Midtown Sacramento and several stores were looted and vandalized. The Sacramento Police Department declared the protests an unlawful assembly and arrested 25 protesters, 22 of which were charged with looting. On June 1, Sacramento Mayor Darrell Steinberg issued a curfew. Later that day, over a thousand people attended a prayer gathering at Cesar Chavez Plaza before marching to the County District Attorney's office and back, eventually breaking curfew. Among the later leaders was Stevante Clark, brother of police shooting victim Stephon Clark. On June 5, over 1,000 protesters staged a "die-in" in the Pocket neighborhood near Steinberg's home.
- Salinas: On June 1, hundreds brought to Hartnell College where they displayed them to drivers on West Alisal street and then marched Salinas City Hall. Hundreds more attended a second rally organized by the League of United Latin American Citizens outside the California Rodeo Salinas.
- Santa Cruz: On May 30, hundreds of protesters gathered peacefully on Pacific Avenue. The city's Mayor and Police Chief joined the protest.
- Seaside: On May 30, hundreds of solidarity protesters gathered at Seaside City Hall and briefly blocked Highway 1.
- Sonora: On June 3, hundreds of people met in downtown Sonora to protest peacefully. Across the street from the protest about 100 counter-protesters gathered. During a nine-minute moment of silence, the counter-protesters began reciting the Pledge of Allegiance.
- South Lake Tahoe: A few dozen people held a protest in late July.
- Ukiah: More than 200 gathered in downtown Ukiah on May 31.
- Watsonville: On May 31, hundreds of peaceful protesters gathered in the downtown plaza, where they were joined by the city's Police Chief.
- Willits: On May 31, over 50 people held a peaceful protest in Babcock Park.
- Woodland: About 150-200 protesters demonstrated peacefully on the south side of Freeman Park in front of the Yolo County Courthouse on May 31.

=== Bay Area ===
Protests occurred in at least twenty-nine cities in the San Francisco Bay Area.

== Central California ==
- Bakersfield: On May 29, hundreds of protesters blocked traffic on Truxtun Avenue. 10 people were arrested. A 31-year-old man ran his car into protesters, striking a 15-year-old, and was arrested for attempted murder.
- Chowchilla: The Merced branch of the NAACP organized a protest on June 2.
- Fresno:
  - May 30: Hundreds of marchers demonstrated in multiple locations throughout Fresno including a march from Chukchansi Park in Downtown Fresno north to the Tower District and River Park. One business in Central Fresno reported broken glass from a group that strayed from the original protests.
  - May 31: Over 3,000 protesters marched up Fresno Street toward the Fresno Police headquarters.
  - June 6: Caleb Kelly and other athletes joined a rally around the River Park shopping area, and southwest Fresno had a march that ended with a gathering at the Cecil C. Hinton Center.
  - June 18: Several hundred people gathered and painted "Black Lives Matter" on P Street in front of Fresno City Hall. The Fresno City Council and Mayor Lee Brand unanimously declared June 18, "Black Lives Matter Day" in the city.
- Los Banos: On June 2, more than 100 protesters marched from Los Banos City Hall to Los Banos County Park.
- Madera: On June 5, around 200 protesters marched from John Adams Elementary to Lions Park.
- Merced: Around 400 people protested on May 30.
- Modesto: On May 31, hundreds of protesters in Modesto marched through downtown core and diverged up to McHenry Avenue until reaching Standiford Ave. Protesters then walked south back to downtown starting point. Protests were largely peaceful with few instances of bottles being thrown at police. Fifteen people were arrested.
- Porterville: On May 30, approximately 150 protesters marched through downtown Porterville, passing through the Porterville Police Department, City Hall and Centennial Park. Neither bystanders nor police officers interfered with the protest. Virtually all of the protesters appeared to be of high school or college age.
- Stockton: 500 people protested at Stockton's Martin Luther King, Jr. Park on June 1.
- Visalia: May 30: At around 3pm, the protest was interrupted by a Jeep flying an American flag and a Keep America Great flag which drove into protesters, hitting two.
- Small protests were held in Corcoran, Hanford, Tulare, Reedley, Kingsburg, Clovis, Chowchilla and Los Banos.

== Southern California ==
- Calexico: On June 2, hundreds of protesters gathered in front of the Imperial County Courthouse.
- El Centro: On June 1, businesses shut down in anticipation of a planned George Floyd protest. Hundreds gathered at the Imperial County Courthouse to peacefully protest the murder of George Floyd.
- Ridgecrest: Between May 31 and June 2, as many as 65 protesters gathered in Ridgecrest. June 2 had the largest protest with at least 65 demonstrators attending. On this day, signs were held during the protest, and music from Michael Jackson and reggae were played during the event.

=== Los Angeles County ===
Protests occurred in at least forty-nine cities in Los Angeles County.

=== Orange County ===
- Aliso Viejo: On June 5, around 400 protesters demonstrators along the street to condemn police brutality and racism.
- Anaheim: On June 1, more than 500 protesters marched from La Palma Park to Anaheim City Hall. A city curfew was declared for 7pm, followed by 25 arrests. No looting was reported.
- Brea: On June 2, hundreds of demonstrators participated in a march which included a silent protest in which they knelt in front of police officers.
- Costa Mesa: On June 4, around 500 demonstrators protested on Newport Blvd., while chanting and carrying signs. The protests started at around 4 p.m. in a parking lot at a Vons.
- Cypress: On June 5, protesters waved signs while marching on Katella Ave. to Winner's Circle. Hundreds of demonstrators attended the protest.
- Dana Point: On June 5, about a thousand protesters demonstrated at Dana Point Harbor to condemn the murder of George Floyd and police brutality. This was the second Black Lives Matter protest in the city and the largest thus far. Protesters marched from Dana Point Harbor up along Golden Lantern toward Pacific Coast Highway, then toward Salt Creek Beach; the protest was entirely peaceful and many passing cars honked in approval.
- Fullerton: About 150 protesters gathered on May 30. The protest occurred at Kelly's Corner, where Kelly Thomas was killed by Fullerton Police in 2011.
- Garden Grove: On June 3, thousands of protesters walked from the Village Green in front of the "Tower on the Green" clock tower in a 4-mile loop, down Euclid Street, Garden Grove Boulevard, Brookhurst Street and Chapman Avenue. When the young, diverse and peaceful crowd returned to the clock tower, they got down on one knee for a moment of silence lasting 8 minutes and 46 seconds, the amount of time Derek Chauvin had his knee on George Floyd's neck before he died
- Huntington Beach: More than 500 people demonstrated at the Huntington Beach Pier at 11:30am on May 31. It was declared an unlawful assembly by 1pm after counter-protesters showed up.

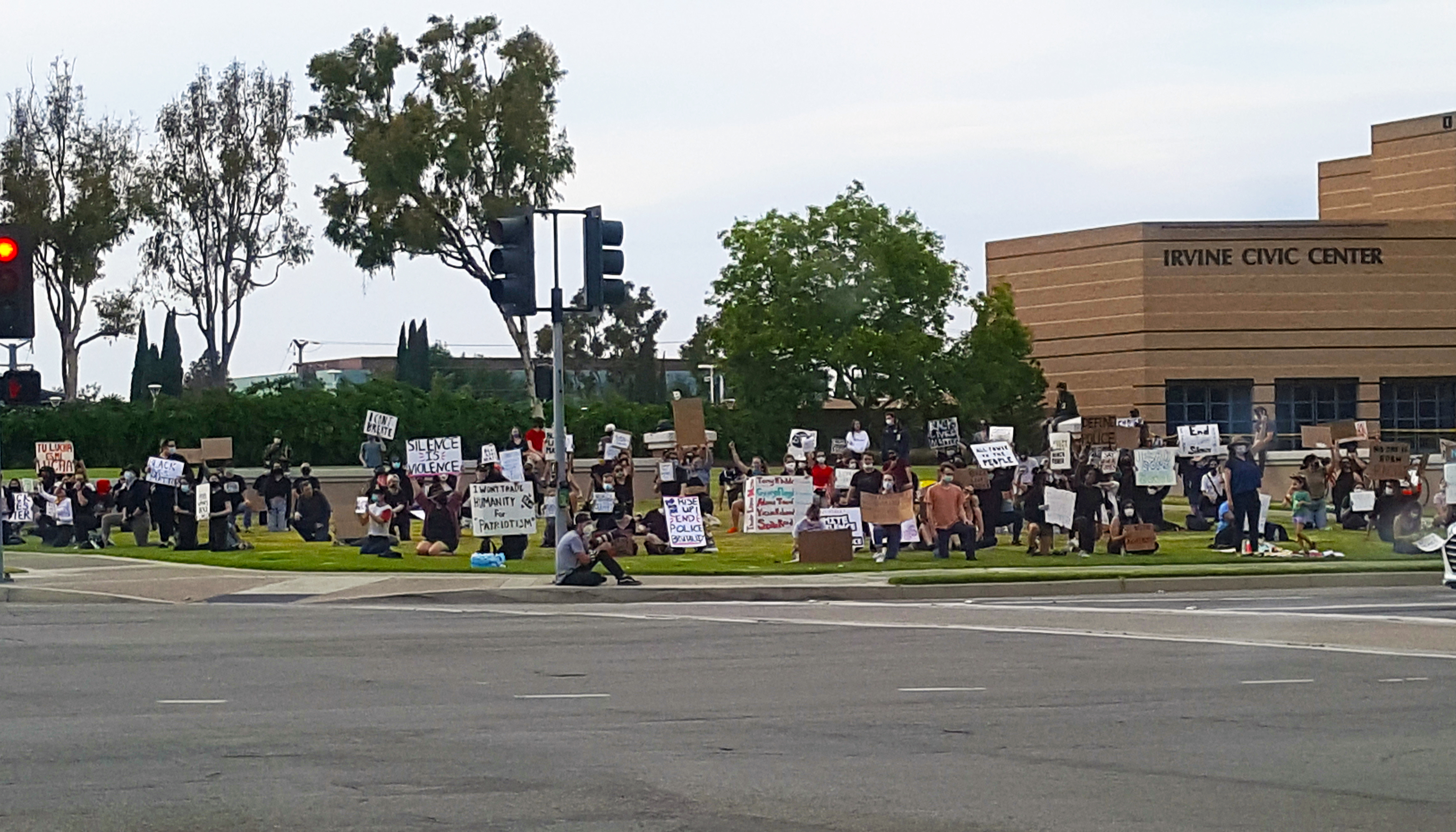
Protest at Irvine Civic Center on June 2

- Irvine: On May 31, dozens peacefully protested at Irvine City Hall. On June 2, more than 150 returned for the third consecutive day of protests, kneeling for passing cars.
- La Habra: On June 3, at least 200 protesters gathered to support the Black Lives Matter movement and protest the murder of George Floyd in La Bonita Park.
- Laguna Beach: On June 5, at least 100 protesters appeared at Main Beach in Laguna Beach to protest police brutality and systemic racism. Demonstrators held flowers, burned sage, and yelled "No justice, no peace." Protesters felt it was important for the affluent white neighborhood to show solidarity with the black community against racism.
- Los Alamitos: On June 2, about 100 students and a few adults gathered near Los Alamitos High School to protest. They chanted "I can't breathe" and "Black Lives Matter".
- Newport Beach: On June 4, four peaceful protests were held. During the protests, a shirtless white man with a gun approached a black man and shouted "black lives don't matter." A car was driven into one of the protests. The driver was arrested. Hundreds of demonstrators attended the protest.
- Orange: On May 30, hundreds marched at the Orange Plaza.
- San Clemente: On May 31, more than 700 people protested peacefully at the San Clemente Pier. On June 1, nearly 500 gathered at the pier.
- Santa Ana: On May 30, hundreds of protesters gathered at McFadden Avenue and Bristol Street to protest the murder of George Floyd. Authorities reported that some protesters threw fireworks and other objects at police officers, who fired back with rubber bullets and tear gas canisters.
- Westminster: On June 5, about 200 protesters gathered at Liberty Park. They sang "Happy Birthday" to Breonna Taylor. They then marched to the Westminster Civic Center. The protest was overall peaceful.

=== Riverside County ===
- Banning: On June 5, around 100 people marched from Repplier Park to the Banning Police Department in solidarity with Black Lives Matter.
- Corona: Around 500 people gathered on June 1 at Santana Park in Corona. Corona Mayor Jim Steiner and Police Chief George Johnstone were in attendance.
- Hemet: On May 31, around 250 people took part in a protest at the Hemet Valley Mall. The event began peacefully before several protesters broke into the mall and looted stores. At least one arrest was made.
- La Quinta: On June 2, about 50 to 60 people participated in a protest at La Quinta Community Park. On June 4, about 125 people showed up to Rancho Mirage Community Park and marched to Highway 111.
- Norco: On June 29, a small protest was held at Neal Snipes Park. Demonstrators were aggressively provoked by a larger crowd of counter-protesters before marching to Norco City Hall. The city issued a 12-hour curfew in response.
- Palm Desert: On June 1, at least 500 protesters marched in a peaceful protest, starting at the Palm Desert Civic Center Park and walking along Fred Waring. Officers joined in, kneeling with protesters. Despite the county-imposed curfew of 6:00 pm, the protests extended beyond that time causing police to set off smoke bombs on the small remaining crowd.
- Palm Springs: On June 1, a protest of 50 people started early near Palm Canyon downtown but eventually grew to 500. Protesters asked police officers to "kneel with us." Prayers were said. Organizers decided to cancel the event at one point but the crowds remained. Riverside County officials said that the reason for setting a curfew was in response to riots in other cities in southern California and only partially because of the planned protest. Palm Springs Mayor Geoff Kors, a former civil-rights attorney, said: "This isn't a curfew. This is government taking away our First Amendment rights."
- Rancho Mirage: On June 3, more than 125 marchers chanted "No Justice! No peace!" along San Jacinto Drive and Highway 111 and Rancho Mirage Community Park.
- Riverside: On June 1, hundreds protested at a "Stand in Solidarity" demonstration outside the Robert Presley Detention Center and the Riverside Public Library. A "small amount" of arrests were made. A plane with a banner that said "We Love the Police" flew overheard.
- Temecula: On May 30, hundreds of protesters came to protest at the Temecula Duck Pond. Six hours into the protest, Riverside County sheriff's deputies issued a dispersal order.

=== San Bernardino County ===
- Apple Valley: On June 3, hundreds of protesters demonstrated at the corner of Jess Ranch Parkway and Bear Valley Road during the afternoon. At least two clashes occurred between protesters and counter-protesters, which involved a firearm. At one point, there were between 300 and 400 people at the event.
- Barstow: On June 1, demonstrators protested at a Walmart on Montara Road shortly after 5 p.m.
- Big Bear Lake: On June 3, a small group of protesters demonstrated at the entrance of Interlaken Center. During the middle of the day, more demonstrators joined the group.
- Chino: On May 31, about 35 peaceful protesters demonstrated at the Chino City Hall from 1 to 3 p.m. On June 6, hundreds of protesters marched through the streets to peacefully protest racial inequality during a Black Lives Matter demonstration. The protest started on Yorba Avenue, and the demonstrators kneeled for 8 minutes and 46 seconds to commemorate the time that Minneapolis police officer Derek Chauvin kneeled on George Floyd's neck.
- Chino Hills: On May 31, hundreds of demonstrators chanted and held up signs that said "No justice, no peace" and "Black Lives Matters" at the corners of Grand Avenue and Peyton Drive. On June 2, hundreds of community members gathered in a peaceful protest to condemn the murder of George Floyd. Mayor Art Bennett showed his support for the protest as well.
- Fontana: On May 29, around 100 protesters took to the streets of downtown Fontana. Rioters blocked traffic on Sierra Avenue and threw rocks and bottles at cars and buildings. Some threw bottles at police. Nine arrests were made for vandalism of cars, buildings, and the Fontana City Hall.
- Joshua Tree/Twentynine Palms/Yucca Valley: In the afternoon of May 31, over 100 demonstrators protested on California State Route 62 and nearby streets.
- Montclair: On May 31, at around 3 p.m., a peaceful protest occurred where demonstrators protested in Montclair and later traveled to the cities of Claremont and Pomona.
- Ontario: On June 6, around 300 protesters gathered at Ontario Mills and marched towards Rancho Cucamonga City Hall.
- Rancho Cucamonga: On May 29, hundreds of people attended a protest which started at 5 p.m. The protest was peaceful for two hours before they took over the intersection at Foothill Blvd. and Day Creek. Protesters prevented a bus from moving and attacked cars. Several demonstrators were arrested for failing to obey a legal dispersal order. On May 30, at least 200 people attended a protest at the intersection at Foothill Blvd. and Day Creek. They attempted to stop traffic on Interstate 15 but were stopped by California Highway Patrol officers. Later, they marched on Foothill Blvd. to Milliken Ave. By 4 p.m., about 100 protesters demonstrated at the corner.
- Redlands: On May 31, three protests occurred. In the largest of the three protests, people marched downtown and took a knee at Ed Hales Park on Fifth Street and outside of the Redlands Police Department.
- San Bernardino: On May 31, hundreds of protesters gathered outside City Hall and the San Bernardino Police Department, chanting "No justice, no peace! No racist police!" In response, California Highway Patrol officers were sent to keep demonstrators off the freeway lanes. A Bank of America was vandalized, several small fires were reported throughout the city, and water bottles and rocks were thrown at CHP officers.
- Upland: On June 1, several hundred protesters gathered at the intersection of Foothill Boulevard and Euclid Avenue. During the protest, a man was seen brandishing a gun at protesters. The man was arrested and booked at the West Valley Detention Center. Later in the protests, demonstrators blocked a street near Foothill Blvd. and Euclid Ave. and threw rocks and water bottles at police. In response to this, police officers fired pepper balls and sting balls.
- Victorville: On May 31, at least 100 demonstrators protested and held up signs on the Bear Valley Road overpass. On the same day, a black man named Malcolm Harsch was found hanging from a tree near a homeless encampment in Victorville. The families of Mr. Harsch and Robert Fuller who was found hanging from a tree 50 miles away in Palmdale are challenging initial reports of suicide. The CHP and the FBI are investigating.
- Yucaipa: A peaceful protest occurred on May 30 at the corner of Oak Glen Road and Yucaipa Boulevard from noon to 4 p.m.

=== San Diego County ===
Protests occurred in at least sixteen cities in San Diego County.

=== San Luis Obispo County ===
- Arroyo Grande: On June 5, over 200 protesters marched peacefully along Grand Avenue.
- Los Osos: On June 9, about 100 people protested at a local park and marched along South Bay Drive.
- Morro Bay: On June 6, several protesters protested near Morro Rock.
- Paso Robles: On May 31, over 100 people peacefully protested in City Park.
- San Luis Obispo: On June 1, hundreds of protesters gathered at Mission Plaza and marched through downtown. After protesters blocked the road, the gathering was declared unlawful. Police fired tear gas, rubber bullets and firecrackers into the crowd, several protesters were arrested, and after a line of police moved towards downtown, most of the protesters dispersed.

=== Santa Barbara County ===
- Lompoc: A peaceful demonstration was held on May 30. On June 2, protesters marched from Ryon Park to the Lompoc Police Department to protest the murder of George Floyd. They then returned to Ryon Park and held a candlelight vigil in Floyd's honor.

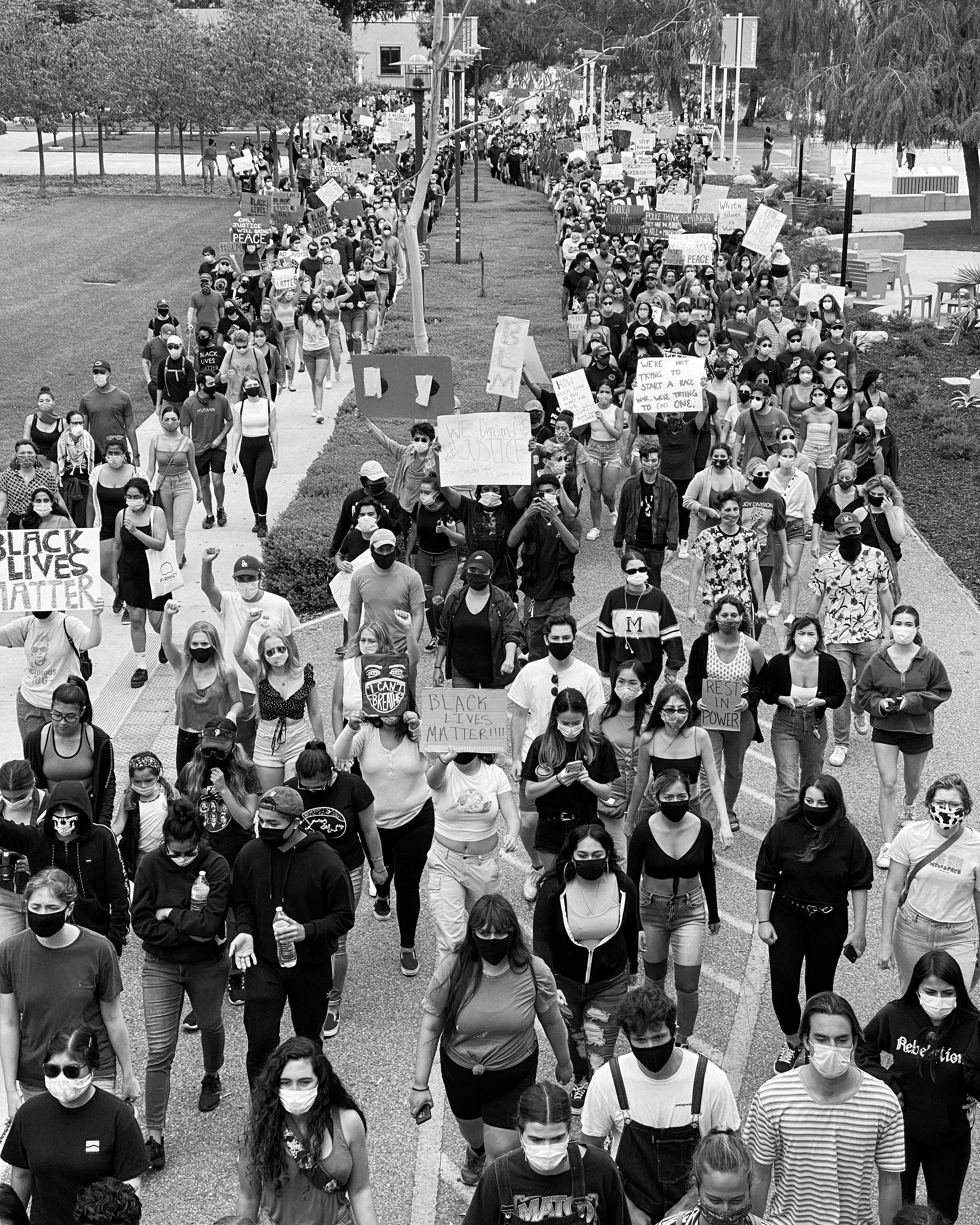
Students of University of California, Santa Barbara marching on May 30

- Santa Barbara: On May 30, hundreds gathered for a demonstration at Storke Tower on the UCSB campus.
- Santa Maria: On June 4, an estimated 150 people protested outside Santa Maria City Hall in support of George Floyd. The event was supported by numerous nonprofit organizations, including the local NAACP.
- Solvang: On June 5, about 200 protesters demonstrated at Solvang Park, where they knelt down for 8 minutes and 46 seconds. Protesters then marched on Mission Drive, calling for justice. Some businesses boarded up their windows before the protest as a precaution.

=== Ventura County ===
- Oxnard: On May 30, more than 300 protesters marched from Plaza Park to the Oxnard Police Department.
- Simi Valley: On June 6, thousands of protesters marched on the streets and halted traffic. It was the same city in which four officers were found not guilty of beating Rodney King.
- Thousand Oaks: On May 30, more than 100 protesters gathered at a busy intersection.
- Ventura: On June 7, around 1,500 people gathered at the Ventura County Government Center to peacefully protest the murder of George Floyd. There was an incident where a white pick-up truck allegedly drove into the crowd, hitting a pedestrian, then drove away.

== See also ==
- List of George Floyd protests in the United States
- List of George Floyd protests outside the United States
- Racism
