= George Floyd protests in Los Angeles County, California =

2020 civil unrest after the murder of George Floyd

George Floyd protests and riots in Los Angeles County, California
- Part of George Floyd protests in California
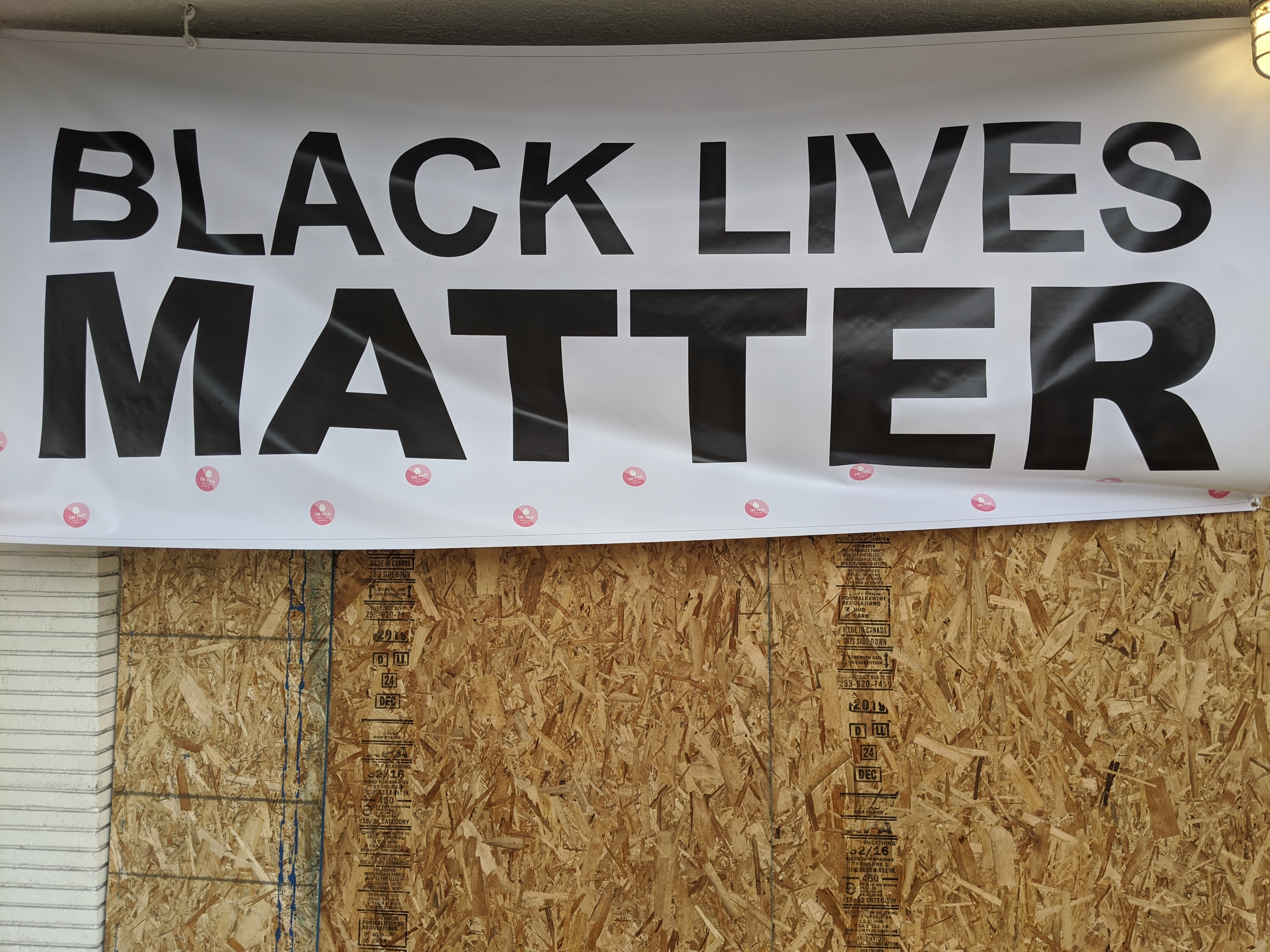
- A Black Lives Matter banner in Burbank
- Date: May 28 – July 25, 2020 (1 month, 3 weeks and 6 days)
- Location: Los Angeles County, California, United States
- Caused by: Police brutality; Institutional racism against African Americans; Reaction to the murder of George Floyd; Economic, racial and social inequality

This is a list of protests that took place in Los Angeles County, California following the murder of George Floyd on May 25, 2020, in Minneapolis, Minnesota, while in police custody.

== Locations ==
=== Alhambra ===
On June 4, about 200 residents marched from Almansor Park to Alhambra City Hall.

=== Altadena ===
On June 6, hundreds of demonstrators gathered in Charles White Park in Altadena to protest the murder of George Floyd and other acts of police brutality. The protest was organized by the Altadena-based grassroots organization My Tribe Rise, which aims to feed the homeless and contribute to various communities throughout Southern California.

=== Avalon ===
On June 3, a small protest was held at the Avalon town square by young adults in Catalina Island.

=== Beverly Hills ===
On May 30, protesters entered Beverly Hills, having marched from the Fairfax district in Los Angeles. Demonstrators were largely peaceful, but opportunistic looters broke into luxury stores along Rodeo Drive and other locations. Fireworks were set off near police cruisers, and widespread vandalization occurred. A city curfew was imposed starting at 8 p.m.

On June 26, between 24 and 28 protesters were arrested in Beverly Hills on entirely nonviolent charges, excepting one individual suspected on an arson charge. They were detained for upwards of twenty hours in what the National Lawyers Guild called "punitive".

=== Boyle Heights ===
On June 7, hundreds gathered at Mariachi Plaza on foot and in cars to protest police brutality in Boyle Heights, a historically Latino neighborhood.

=== Burbank ===
On June 4, at around noon, hundreds of protesters gathered at a park where they made their way to Burbank City Hall and the Burbank Police Department.

=== Calabasas ===
On June 2 and June 3, hundreds of protesters marched in Calabasas in temperatures exceeding 100 degrees Fahrenheit to support racial justice. The large crowd chanted "Black Lives Matter", "Hands up, don't shoot", and "Say their names" while subsequently listing African-Americans killed by police. All protests were peaceful, and the city government released a statement strongly condemning the murder of George Floyd and systemic racism as a whole.

=== Century City ===
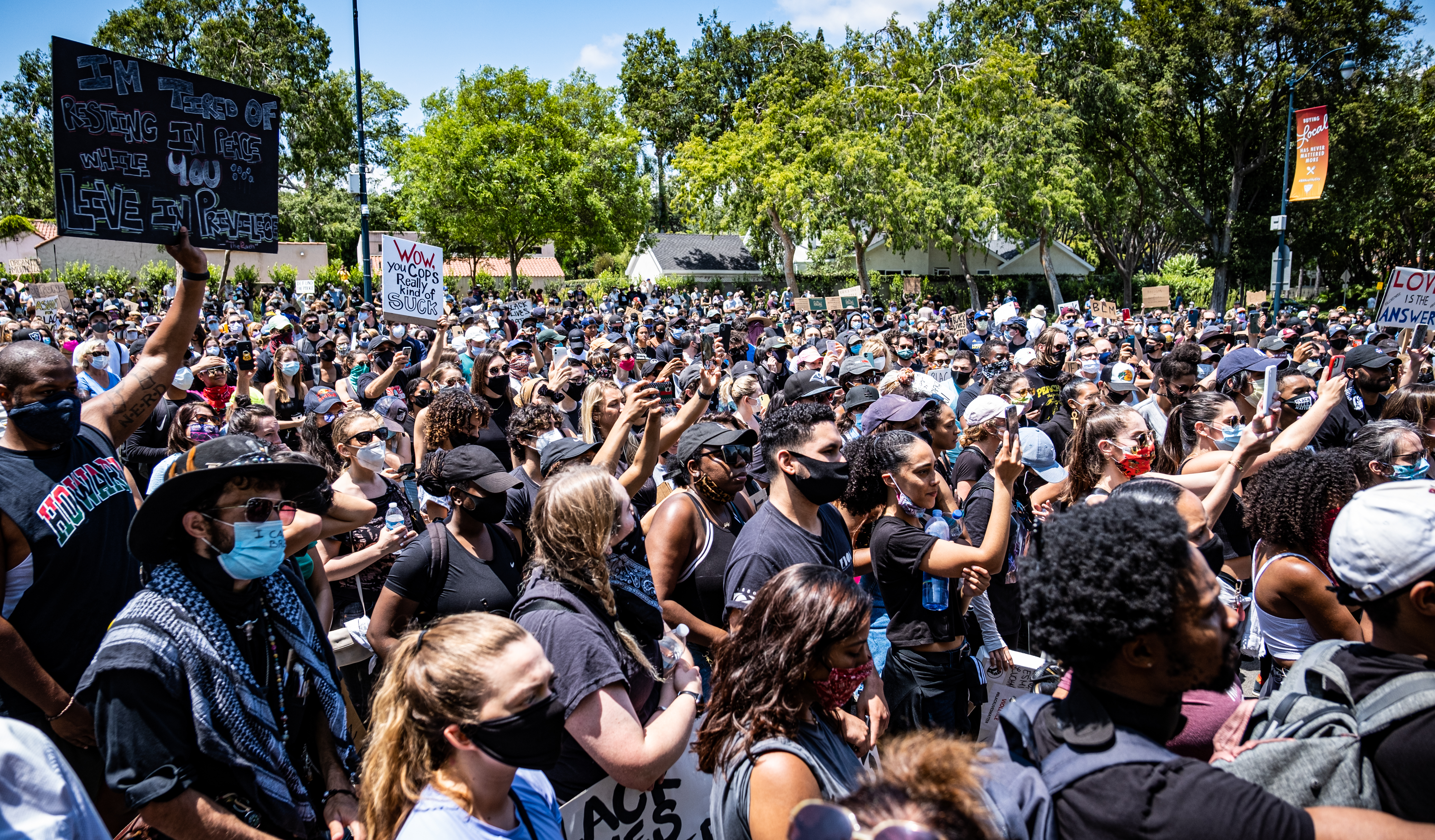
Protest in Century City, Los Angeles on June 6

On June 6, around 600 people protested peacefully in Century City. The demonstrators then protested outside the ICM Partners Building, where speakers spoke to the crowd.

=== Cerritos ===
On June 1, hundreds protested at Gridley Park and Cerritos City Hall.

=== Claremont ===
On June 1, over 100 protesters in Claremont gathered at the corner of Indian Hill Boulevard and Foothill Boulevard at 3:00 p.m. They marched down Indian Hill Boulevard to Memorial Park. The event was organized by a group of students from Claremont High School.

=== Compton ===
Thousands attended two Black Lives Matter protests at Compton on June 7, including famous natives of the city Kendrick Lamar and DeMar DeRozan, as well as Hawthorne native Russell Westbrook.

=== Covina ===
On June 3, hundreds attended a rally at Heritage Park, in front of the Covina Police Department.

=== Culver City ===
On June 5, more than 300 people protested peacefully in Veterans Park in Culver City.

=== Diamond Bar ===
Between 800 and 1,000 protesters gathered and marched in Diamond Bar on June 4 at 1:00 pm. The protest was declared an unlawful assembly after protesters blocked traffic at an intersection. The crowd panicked once a sheriff's deputy shot pepper balls at the asphalt.

=== Downey ===
Hundreds marched down Firestone Boulevard between the Downey Promenade and downtown Downey on June 3.

=== Downtown Los Angeles ===
On May 27, protesters organized by the Los Angeles chapter of Black Lives Matter gathered outside of the Hall of Justice and proceeded to block the Hollywood Freeway. Protesters also shattered the windows on two California Highway Patrol cruisers.

On May 29, protesters blocked traffic and threw rocks at the windows of businesses and passing vehicles. They also set off fireworks which hit several buildings. Looters broke into several stores and stole items such as televisions and jewelry. Buildings were also spray painted. Thousands of protesters converged on the 110 Freeway, shutting it down temporarily. Several protesters scuffled with police, which resulted in two officer injuries. Police begun to use batons and rubber bullets against the protesters.

On May 30, Los Angeles Mayor, Eric Garcetti authorized the deployment of the California National Guard overnight. On May 30, 2020, protesters put an LAPD officer in a chokehold and kicked the officer. Also in Los Angeles, a wheelchair-using man was shot in the face with a rubber projectile; pictures of the man's bloody face were widely shared.

On July 25, the LAPD declared a tactical alert in response to reports of vandalism, including broken windows and graffiti, at the federal courthouse amid downtown protests reportedly in solidarity against the deployment of federal agents in Portland, Oregon. Demonstrators had marched along a stretch of Highway 101 earlier in the day. According to police, some arrests were made and the crowd largely dispersed by 9:30 p.m.

=== El Monte ===
On June 1, speakers at a protest in El Monte said "All lives matter" instead of "Black lives matter", which caused many people to go onto social media to criticize the speakers.

=== Fairfax District ===
On May 30, thousands of protesters began their march at Pan Pacific Park in the Fairfax District, then spread out towards West Hollywood, Beverly Hills, and other areas. Stores and police cars were vandalized on Beverly Boulevard near the shopping center The Grove and several vehicles were torched. Instances of looting occurred in Fairfax, and a police kiosk was set on fire in The Grove.

Beginning the night of May 30, 2020, protesters looted and vandalized synagogues and Jewish stores in the Fairfax District. One synagogue was spray-painted with the words "F*ck Israel" and "Free Palestine". A statue of Swedish diplomat Raoul Wallenberg, who saved thousands of Jews in German-occupied Hungary from the Holocaust, was defaced with anti-Semitic slogans.

=== Glendora ===
On June 1, a protest of over 100 demonstrators started at 2:00 p.m. at the corner of Route 66 and South Grand Avenue in Glendora. Protesters chanted "I can't breathe" and "No justice, no peace". A moment of silence was held for eight minutes, and five members of the Glendora Police Department knelt with the protesters.

=== Hancock Park ===
On June 2, protesters chanted "defund the police" outside Los Angeles Mayor Garcetti's house in Hancock Park.

=== Hollywood ===
On June 2, thousands of protesters turned up in Hollywood for a second day to demand justice following the murder of George Floyd. The demonstration began around noon near the intersection of Hollywood Boulevard and Vine Street, and quickly grew in size. At one point, two different large bodies of protesters were covering extensive ground across the area.

On June 7, fueled by continued outrage over the murder of George Floyd, tens of thousands of people spilled onto the streets of Hollywood on Sunday evening. A crowd estimated at between 20,000 and 30,000 protesters tied up multiple city blocks on various Hollywood streets until well into the evening.

On June 13, the All Black Lives Matter anti-racism solidarity march drew at least 20,000 people, shutting down Hollywood Boulevard to vehicle traffic from Highland Avenue to La Brea Avenue, police said.

=== La Cañada Flintridge ===
On May 31, hundreds of protesters gathered at the intersection of Angeles Crest Highway and Foothill Boulevard in La Cañada Flintridge.

=== La Crescenta-Montrose ===
On June 1, around 20 people protested at Demoret Park in La Crescenta-Montrose. The next day, around 100 additional protesters gathered at the same location. On June 6, hundreds gathered to continue speaking out against racial injustice and police brutality in a largely peaceful protest.

=== La Puente ===
On June 3, hundreds of people protested at the intersection of Hacienda Boulevard and Amar Road in La Puente, chanting, "No Justice, No Peace."

=== La Verne ===
On June 3, hundreds of people gathered outside La Verne City Hall, including Mayor Tim Hepburn.

=== Lakewood ===
On June 5, a group of roughly 500 protesters walked from Long Beach City College to Lakewood City Hall.

=== Long Beach ===
On May 31, hundreds of protesters showed up to condemn police brutality on Ocean Avenue in Long Beach. There were reports of heavy looting and vandalism at 5:00 p.m. at the Pike Outlets.

=== Malibu ===
On June 8, about 200 people showed up at Zuma Beach for a large Black Lives Matter protest in Malibu. It is believed to be Malibu's largest political demonstration in 15 years.

=== Manhattan Beach ===
On June 6, in Manhattan Beach more than 500 protesters marched from the Manhattan Beach Pier to the Hermosa Beach border. The protest was kid-friendly, and its goal was to educate kids about racism.

=== Montebello ===
On June 4, hundreds of people gathered outside Montebello Park, with organizers stating they feared little repercussions for racist-inspired violence.

=== Monrovia ===
On June 1 and 2, "at least 400 people" marched peacefully around Myrtle Ave., beginning from the Monrovia Public Library. The demonstrators held up signs and chanted while they circled the street. Several police officers were present and kneeled in with protesters.

=== Palmdale ===
On May 31, between 200 and 300 nonviolent protesters gathered at Marie Kerr Park in Palmdale and made their way to Rancho Vista Boulevard and 10th Street West. A Facebook post by the Palmdale Sheriff's Station said that between 75 and 100 protesters blocked lanes and attacked vehicles.

On June 2, around 300 protesters marched from 47th Street East and Avenue S down to 25th Street where the crowd appeared to triple in size.

On June 10, the body of an African-American man named Robert Fuller was found hanging from a tree in front of Palmdale City Hall. The death was ruled a suicide by the Los Angeles County Sheriff's Office, the victim's family and community are demanding a fuller investigation. As of June 15, the California Highway Patrol, the FBI, the U.S. attorney's office and the U.S. Department of Justice’s Civil Rights Division are monitoring the investigations and the FBI are investigating it as a possible hate-crime/lynching.

=== Palos Verdes Estates ===
On June 1, about 150 people protested outside of the Palos Verdes Estates police station. The majority of the protest was made up of recent high school graduates and their families and children. The demonstrators also held up signs and chanted at the intersection at Malaga Cove Plaza.

=== Pasadena ===
At 6:30 p.m. on May 30, protesters gathered at Colorado Blvd and Fair Oaks Ave. in Pasadena. The city declared a local state of emergency and ordered an 8:00 p.m. curfew.

On June 6, hundreds of protesters gathered at a Black Lives Matter rally to denounce police violence against black people and to stamp out systemic racism in Pasadena.

=== Pomona ===
On May 30, about 250 people protested in Pomona.

=== Rancho Palos Verdes ===
On June 1, about 150 protesters (mostly recent high school graduates) demonstrated outside of the Rancho Palos Verdes police station to support the Black Lives Matter movement and against police brutality. The demonstrators held signs and chanted outside of Malaga Cove Plaza.

=== Redondo Beach ===
On June 3, about 80 protesters gathered at the intersection of Hawthorne and Artesia Boulevards in Redondo Beach, carrying signs saying "Black Lives Matter".

On June 5, more than 200 people gathered at Miramar Park in South Redondo Beach to protest against police brutality and to demand an end to law enforcement policies that the protesters felt discriminate against black and brown communities.

=== Rowland Heights ===
On June 6, at least 200 Rowland Heights residents held signs and flowers as they marched from Gloria Heer Park to Schabarum Park. People also chanted words and phrases calling for justice and "no racist police" on Colima Road.

=== San Dimas ===
On June 5, about 100 protesters demonstrated outside San Dimas City Hall, chanting, "Black lives matter."

San Pedro

From June 1 to June 6, a series of relatively small protests occurred throughout San Pedro, most notably outside the LAPD Harbor Division police station, and the San Pedro Waterfront on Harbor Boulevard.

=== Santa Clarita ===
On June 4, hundreds of protesters gathered at the Santa Clarita civic center and marched to the Valencia Town Center and business district. Many businesses in the area closed for the day and stores boarded their windows. The National Guard was deployed, but no force was used.

=== Santa Monica ===
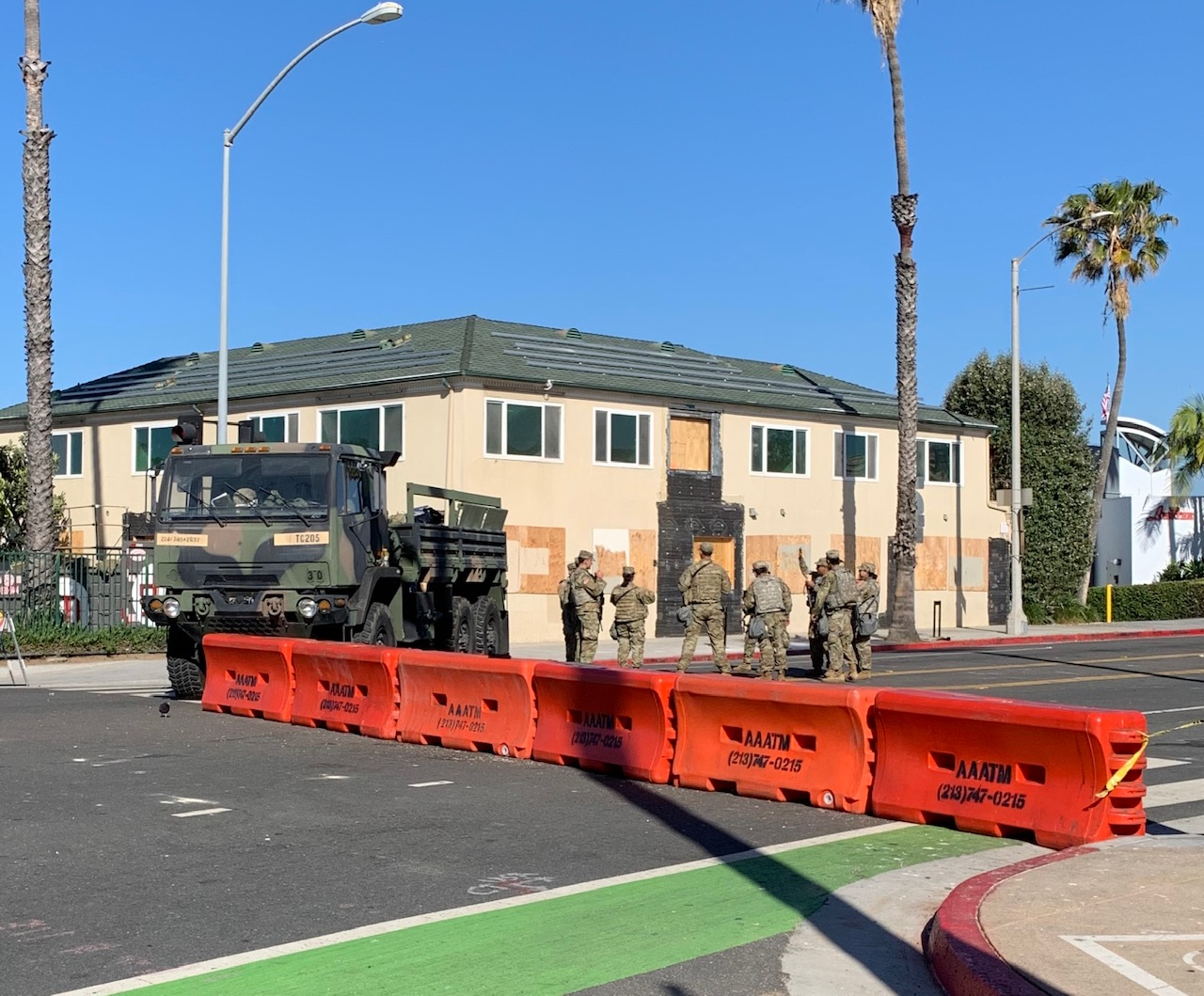
California National Guard in Santa Monica on June 7

On May 28, at 3:00 p.m., protesters gather at Santa Monica Police Station at 333 Olympic Dr. Protesters marched down Ocean Front Walk to a LAPD substation in Venice.

On May 31, hundreds of protesters gathered peacefully along Ocean Boulevard in the afternoon. Looting erupted in the nearby shopping district soon after. Numerous buildings were also vandalized, looted and burned along Santa Monica Boulevard, with the most visible destruction being at the site of the popular Japanese-themed restaurant Sake House. Some protesters refused to disperse after the 4:00 p.m. curfew and engaged in standoffs with police. Hundreds of arrests were made that night.

On June 5, a "paddle out" organized by Black Girls Surf was held at the Bay Street Beach Historic District on Friday morning.

=== Sierra Madre ===
On June 4, a few hundred people gathered at a rally at Sierra Vista Park in Sierra Madre, which included speeches and a sing-along.

=== South Pasadena ===
On June 10, over 100 protesters surrounded South Pasadena City Hall in solidarity and to demand police reform. The group that organized the protest, the South Pasadena Youth for Police Reform, compiled a list of 21 demands for amending and reforming what they believe to be an outdated structure for local law enforcement.

=== Van Nuys ===
On June 1, more than 100 people were arrested after police declared an unlawful assembly and began dispersing the crowd at a protest near the Valley Municipal Building in Van Nuys. Looting and vandalism occurred in the surrounding area as the crowd broke up.

=== Walnut ===
On June 1, more than 100 people attended a protest near Mt. San Antonio College in Walnut. Several of the protesters walked down to the Walnut/Diamond Bar Sheriff Station to continue their protest.

=== West Covina ===
On June 1, a four-hour peaceful protest took place in West Covina, where demonstrators walked to the 10 Freeway overpass from nearby parking lots. At one point, the demonstrators laid down on the overpass. By mid-afternoon, there were around 170 people that participated in the event.

=== West Hollywood ===
On June 3, thousands of people marched up and down Santa Monica Boulevard in West Hollywood to peacefully protest the murder of George Floyd and other acts of police brutality. The crowd was overwhelmingly young, with most of the protesters being white along with some black and Asian protesters as well. City councilmember John D'Amico was among the protesters. The demonstrators marched west from the intersection of Santa Monica Boulevard and La Cienega Boulevard to reach San Vincente Boulevard. From there, the protesters turned to face the West Hollywood's Sheriff's Station. The crowd chanted "What do we want? Justice! When do we want it? Now!", "Prosecute killer cops", and "I can't breathe." The protesters also kneeled for 8 minutes and 46 seconds.

=== Westwood ===
On June 4, more than 1,000 people gathered outside of UCLA's Royce Hall in Westwood and marched towards the UCLA Police Department.

=== Whittier ===
On May 31, hundreds of people marched in the Uptown business district in Whittier. On June 2, hundreds of people marched from Central Park to the police station, chanting "I Can't Breathe."

== Crime rate ==
The Los Angeles Police Department announced that "homicides [in Los Angeles] went up 250% and victims shot went up 56%" from May 31 to June 6.

== Surveillance ==
Internal records show that LAPD Chief Michel Moore directed officers to collect social media information of civilians they encountered at the protest. They had contracted with a firm called Dataminr to track participants in the BLM protests for George Floyd.

== See also ==
- List of George Floyd protests in the United States
- List of George Floyd protests outside the United States
- Racism
