= George Floyd protests in Nevada =

2020 civil unrest after the murder of George Floyd

- Part of George Floyd protests
- Date: May 29 – August 8, 2020 (2 months, 1 week and 3 days)
- Location: Nevada, United States
- Caused by: Police brutality; Institutional racism against African Americans; Reaction to the murder of George Floyd; Economic, racial and social inequality

This is a list of protests related to the murder of George Floyd in Nevada, United States.

== Locations ==
=== Boulder City ===
On June 4, almost 50 people peacefully protested the murder of George Floyd near the Boulder City Police Department, despite the event having been officially postponed by the organizer. There was a brief verbal quarrel with a counter-protester who stated "All Lives Matter."

=== Carson City ===
On June 6, almost 60 people protested outside the Nevada Legislature in support of Black Lives Matter; a pro-police counter-protest was held as well, but both protests were peaceful.

=== Elko ===
At least a dozen protesters gathered together in a peaceful event on June 4.

=== Fallon ===
On June 8, approximately 70 people held a protest in Millennium Park to support Black Lives Matter and George Floyd. A smaller pro-Second Amendment protest was held nearby, which exchanged tense words with the George Floyd protesters. Three men in Ku Klux Klan-like hoods were spotted nearby.

=== Las Vegas ===
On May 29, 2020, approximately 200 to 300 people rallied in the area of Las Vegas Boulevard and Tropicana Avenue. Hundreds of protesters gathered on the strip leading to the police arresting 80 people, including two journalists. Some protesters threw water bottles and rocks at police. 12 police officers were injured during the gathering. The following day, crowds marched to the Regional Justice Center while a separate crowd grew near the Container Park in Downtown Las Vegas. On May 30, 2,000 people gathered in downtown Las Vegas and peacefully protested along Fremont Street. However, after 10:00 pm, police sprayed tear gas on protesters and the police lieutenant made reports of vandalism and throwing of Molotov cocktails. 50 people also looted a pawn shop on Las Vegas Boulevard. An unknown number of arrests were made. On May 31, more rioting took place as at least 24 businesses in downtown Las Vegas were vandalized and a gas station was looted. Police again used tear gas to disperse protesters.

On June 2, the Las Vegas Metropolitan Police announced investigations into two separate shootings involving officers at the 2800 block of Las Vegas Boulevard South and the federal courthouse. On June 3, around 300 protesters engaged in an open and peaceful dialogue with police officers in front of Las Vegas City Hall.

=== Mesquite ===
On June 4, about 100 people peacefully marched the streets to City Hall to protest the murder of George Floyd. Once at City Hall, the protesters took a knee, then lay down on their stomachs while shouting "I can't breathe" for eight minutes and forty-six seconds.

=== Minden ===
About 50 Black Lives Matter supporters protested in Minden on August 8. There were also around 1,500 counterprotesters.

=== North Las Vegas ===
On June 7, about 100 protesters gathered at the Martin Luther King Jr. statue near the North Las Vegas Justice Court, where they listened to speakers discuss George Floyd and the importance of fighting for racial equality.

=== Reno ===
On May 30, 2020, at least 1,000 people participated in a protest in downtown Reno. Protesters drew graffiti, ignited a small fire, and burned a flag. Police vehicle windows were smashed as well as windows of a commercial building. People broke into City Hall and started a fire inside. While no arrests were made, the city government issued a mandatory curfew, effective immediately. Mayor Hillary Schieve declared a state of emergency, and Governor Steve Sisolak activated the Nevada National Guard.

=== Winnemucca ===
On June 5, a group of high school students led a peaceful march along West Winnemucca Boulevard in support of Black Lives Matter.
