= Lie to Me (EP) =

EP by Garbage
- Released: April 20, 2024
- Recorded: 2004–2024
- Length: 17:21
- Label: BMG
- Producer: Garbage; Billy Bush; John King

Garbage chronology
Witness to Your Love (2023)	Lie to Me (2024)	Copy/Paste (2024)

Lie to Me is an EP by American rock band Garbage. It was released on April 20, 2024, on Record Store Day through BMG/Stunvolume in the United States and UK, and its subsidiary Infectious Music in Europe. The EP includes the two previously unreleased tracks, "Better Not Lie To Me"; and "Revenge and Hurt"; a cover of "Song to the Siren" by Tim Buckley and a new remix of Bleed Like Me track "Bad Boyfriend" featuring Dave Grohl.

== Background ==
On February 7, 2024, Garbage announced the release of the Bleed Like Me Expanded Reissue, compiling the 2005 album, its B-sides and some of the remixes and unreleased tracks from that era. On February 15, the band announced their participation to Record Store Day 2024 with the exclusive release of the Lie To Me EP. The release follows the band's previous year Witness to Your Love EP and happened during the band's recording sessions for their eighth studio album.

The cover art is a photo of singer Shirley Manson taken by the band's sound engineer Billy Bush in June 2017.

== Composition ==
The first two songs on the EP, "Better Not Lie to Me" and "Revenge and Hurt", are out-takes from the Bleed Like Me sessions. The former features vocals from all members of Garbage in the chorus and was co-written by Rancid's Tim Armstrong.

"Song to the Siren", originally a song by Tim Buckley, is based on the This Mortal Coil version and pays homage to the British collective. It was originally recorded for a TV show, but the authors decided not to use it.

The "Bad Boyfriend" remix features more emphasis on drums, provided by Dave Grohl.

The first three tracks were recorded at the band's engineer Billy Bush's Red Razor Sounds, in Atwater Village, and at Butch Vig's GrungeIsDead, in Silverlake. The last song was recorded at the band's Smart Studios, in Madison, at GrungeIsDead, and at co-producer John King's The Boat recording studio.

== Release and promotion ==
The EP was originally released as a Record Store Day exclusive, on April 20, on transparent lime-colored vinyl limited to 2,500 copies in the US and 1,000 in the UK, with a digital release coming later. The digital release followed two weeks later, on May 3. It was accompanied by a visualizer for "Song to the Siren" made by visual artist Marcin Pospiech.

== Track listing ==
All tracks are written by Garbage, except where noted

Lie to Me track listing
No.	Title	Writer(s)	Length
1.	"Better Not Lie to Me"	Garbage; Tim Armstrong	3:33
2.	"Revenge and Hurt"		5:45
3.	"Song to the Siren"	Larry Beckett; Tim Buckley	4:15
4.	"Bad Boyfriend" ('23 remix; featuring Dave Grohl)		3:48
Total length:			17:21

== Charts ==
Chart performance for Lie to Me
Chart (2024)	Peak position
Scottish Albums (OCC)	67
UK Independent Albums (OCC)	40

Chart performance for "Better Not Lie to Me"
Chart (2024)	Peak position
UK Physical Singles (OCC)	27
UK Vinyl Singles (OCC)	22
