= Death of Robert Fuller =

Death of an African-American man in 2020

- Date: June 10, 2020
- Time: 3:39 am

Robert L. Fuller was a 24-year-old African-American man who was found hanging from a tree in front of the City Hall in Palmdale, California. His death was ruled a suicide by the Los Angeles County Sheriff's Department. City officials announced that they supported an independent investigation into his death. On July 9, 2020, the LA County Sheriff's office held a news conference announcing that the death was correctly determined a suicide and provided more supporting details from the investigation, including evidence that Fuller had purchased the rope used to hang himself on May 14, almost a month prior. There is video evidence of Fuller using the same EBT card for other purchases subsequent to the purchase of the rope.

There is also evidence that Fuller suffered from mental illness and had been hospitalized in Arizona in 2017 and diagnosed with auditory hallucinations after saying he wanted "to put a gun to his head." In February 2019 he admitted himself to a hospital in California saying he was hearing voices telling him to kill himself. He was later hospitalized in November 2019 in Nevada after saying he planned to hurt himself.

== History ==
Fuller's body was spotted by a passerby at 3:39 am on June 10. Emergency personnel responded to the scene and subsequently identified him as dead.

His death was reported initially as an apparent suicide though a decision on the cause of his death was pending and an autopsy was planned. The manner of his death garnered significant attention in the wake of the murder of George Floyd and subsequent protests.

Members of Fuller's local community spoke to Palmdale city officials at a news briefing on June 12 asking as to why his death was described as a suicide and querying whether it was homicide. Members of the crowd at the press briefing shouted "Hell no!" in response to City Manager J.J. Murphy's request that "we stop talking about lynchings".

Kim Kardashian urged her followers on Twitter to sign a petition demanding an investigation into Fuller's death.

As of June 15, the FBI, U.S. attorney's office in the Central District of California and the U.S. Department of Justice’s Civil Rights Division were monitoring the investigations into Fuller's death and the hanging death of Malcolm Harsch, another African-American man also found hanging from a tree in nearby Victorville just 10 days earlier. Harsch's death was later confirmed a suicide.

A fundraiser for Robert Fuller was launched on GoFundMe shortly after the family announced their belief that Fuller had been lynched, earning the family $237,012. It was later discovered that Fuller had a well known history of depression and mental illness had been hospitalized three times since 2017 with suicidal thoughts. Fuller had previously attempted to commit suicide as recently as February 2020. On Wednesday, June 18th, it was confirmed that Fuller's half-brother was killed in what police called a "gunfight" in Kern County. Several questions arose surrounding the killing.
